= Great Wall SoCool =

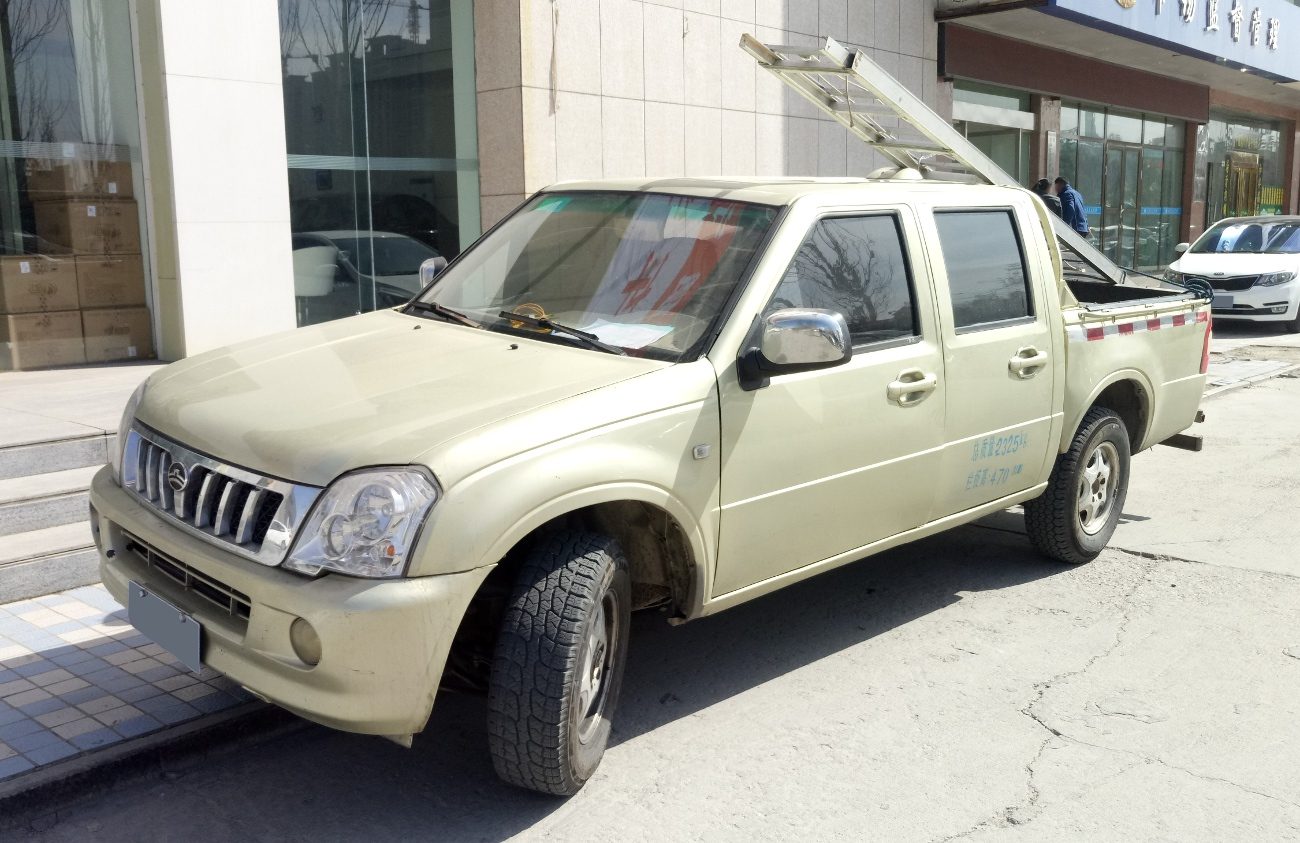

Overview
- Manufacturer: Great Wall Motors
- Production: 2003–2010
- Assembly: Baoding

Body and chassis
- Class: Compact pickup truck
- Body style: 4-door crew cab 2-door pickup truck
- Related: Great Wall Sailor; Great Wall Pegasus; Isuzu Rodeo; Isuzu MU; Isuzu Faster

Powertrain
- Engine: 2.2 L GW491QE I4 (Great Wall Pegasus, Socool)
- Transmission: 5 speed manual

Chronology
- Successor: Great Wall Wingle

The Great Wall SoCool (Chinese: 长城賽酷; pinyin: Chángchéng Sàikù) is a compact pickup truck produced by Great Wall Motors.

== Overview ==
The Great Wall SoCool is powered by the Toyota-sourced GW491QE inline-4 2.2 liter engine. The Great Wall SoCool is the high version of the Great Wall Sailor and just like the Sailor, the body design of the Great Wall SoCool was based on the third generation Isuzu Faster produced under license sharing a front end with the Great Wall Pegasus and styled completely different from the cheaper Great Wall Sailor. The Great Wall SoCool was later replaced by the Great Wall Wingle built on the same platform.

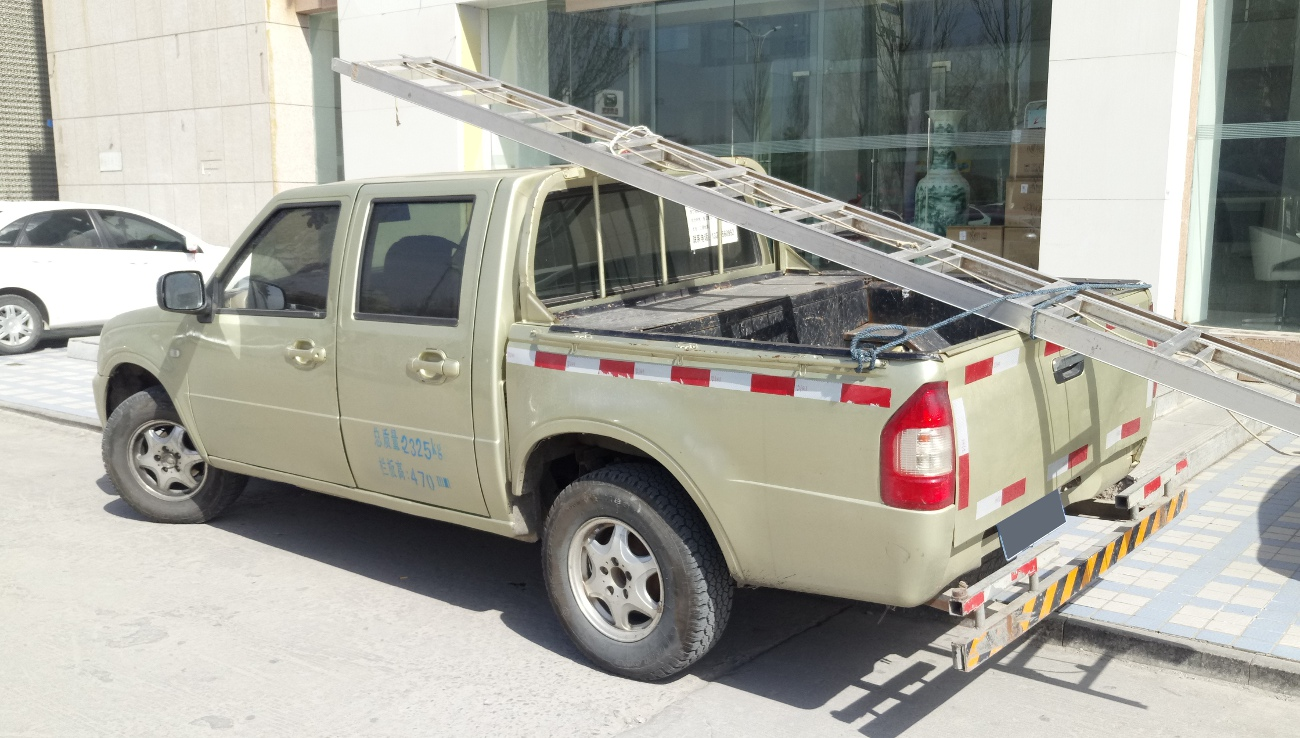
The rear view of the Great Wall SoCool.
