= Great Wall Pegasus =

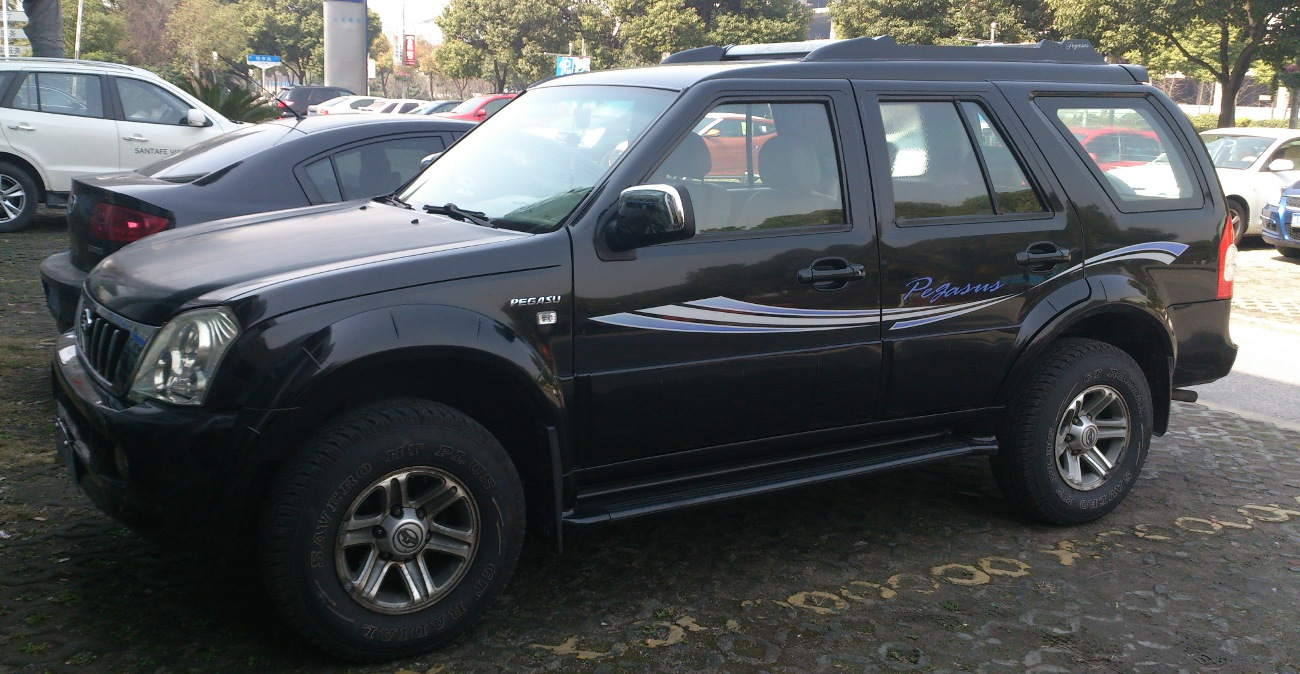

Overview
- Manufacturer: Great Wall Motors
- Production: 2003–2008
- Assembly: Baoding, China

Body and chassis
- Body style: 5-door SUV
- Related: Great Wall SoCool; Isuzu Rodeo; Isuzu MU; Isuzu Faster

Powertrain
- Engine: 2.2 L GW491QE I4 (Great Wall Pegasus, Socool)
- Transmission: 5 speed manual

Dimensions
- Wheelbase: 2,800 mm (110.2 in)
- Length: 4,820 mm (189.8 in)
- Width: 1,700 mm (66.9 in)
- Height: 1,870 mm (73.6 in)
- Curb weight: 1,625 kg (3,583 lb)

Chronology
- Successor: Haval H6

The Great Wall Pegasus (Chinese: 长城赛骏; pinyin: Chángchéng Sàijùn) is a compact SUV produced by Great Wall Motors.

== Overview ==
The Great Wall Pegasus is powered by the Toyota-sourced GW491QE inline-4 2.2 liter engine. As the SUV version of the Great Wall SoCool and the short wheelbase version of the Great Wall Sing, the body design of the Great Wall Pegasus was based on the SWB 5-door Isuzu MU produced under license sharing a redesigned front end with the Great Wall SoCool.

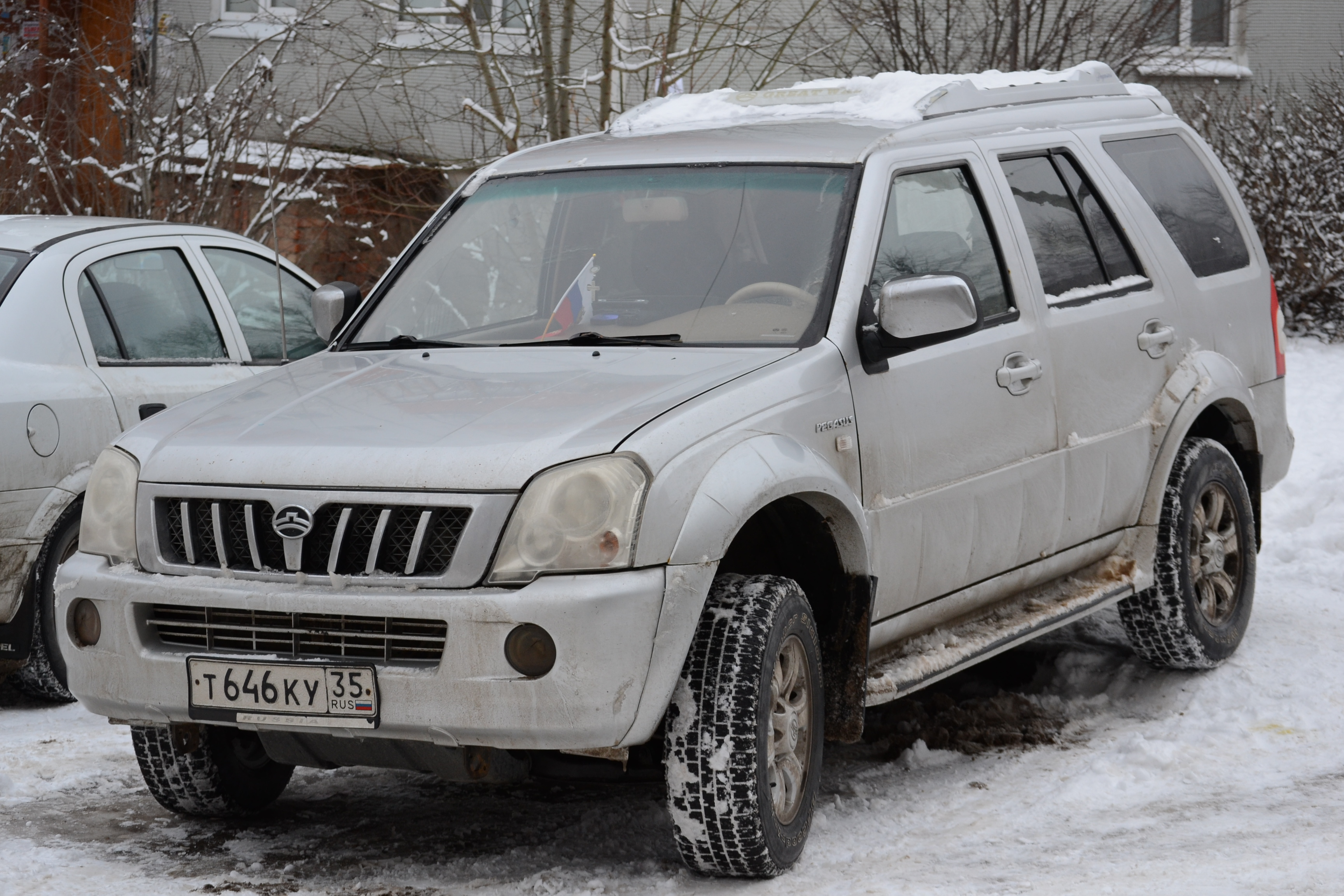
Great Wall Pegasus in Russia

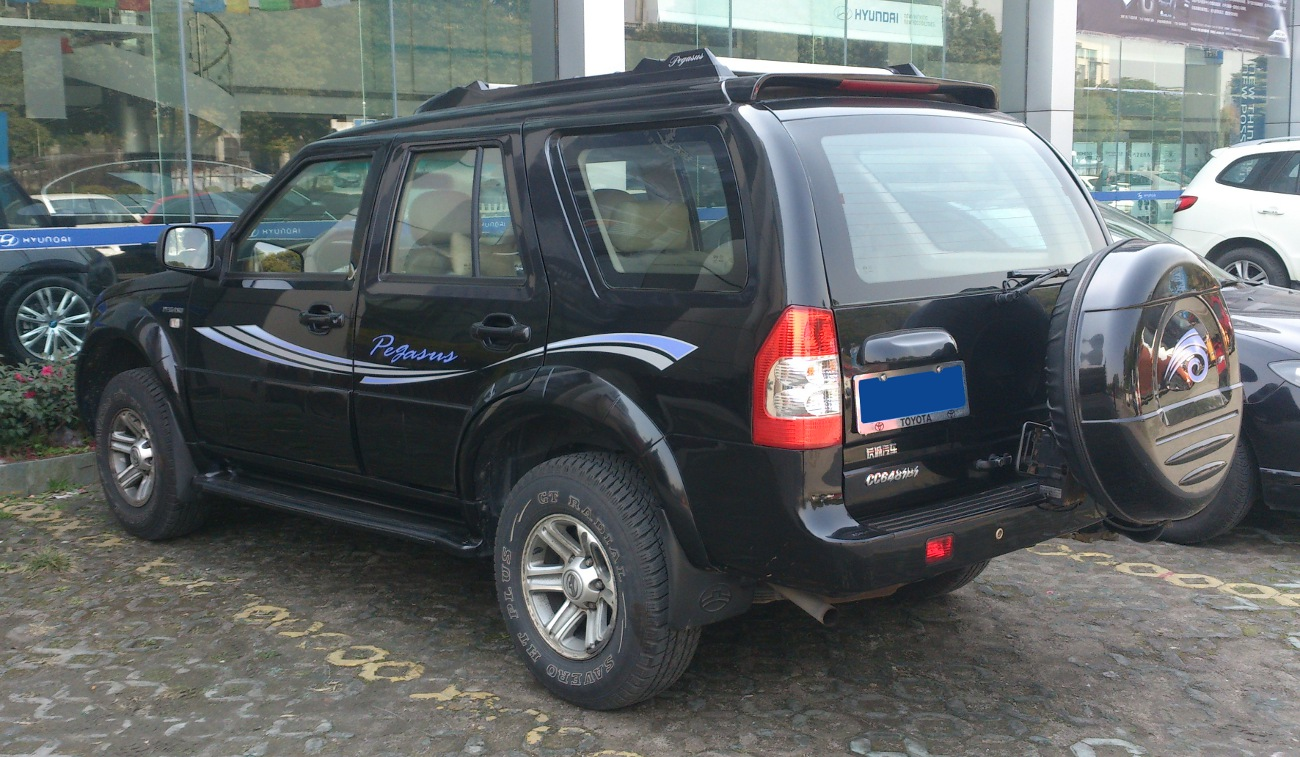
The rear view of the Great Wall Pegasus.
