= Great Wall Wingle =

Chinese pickup truck family

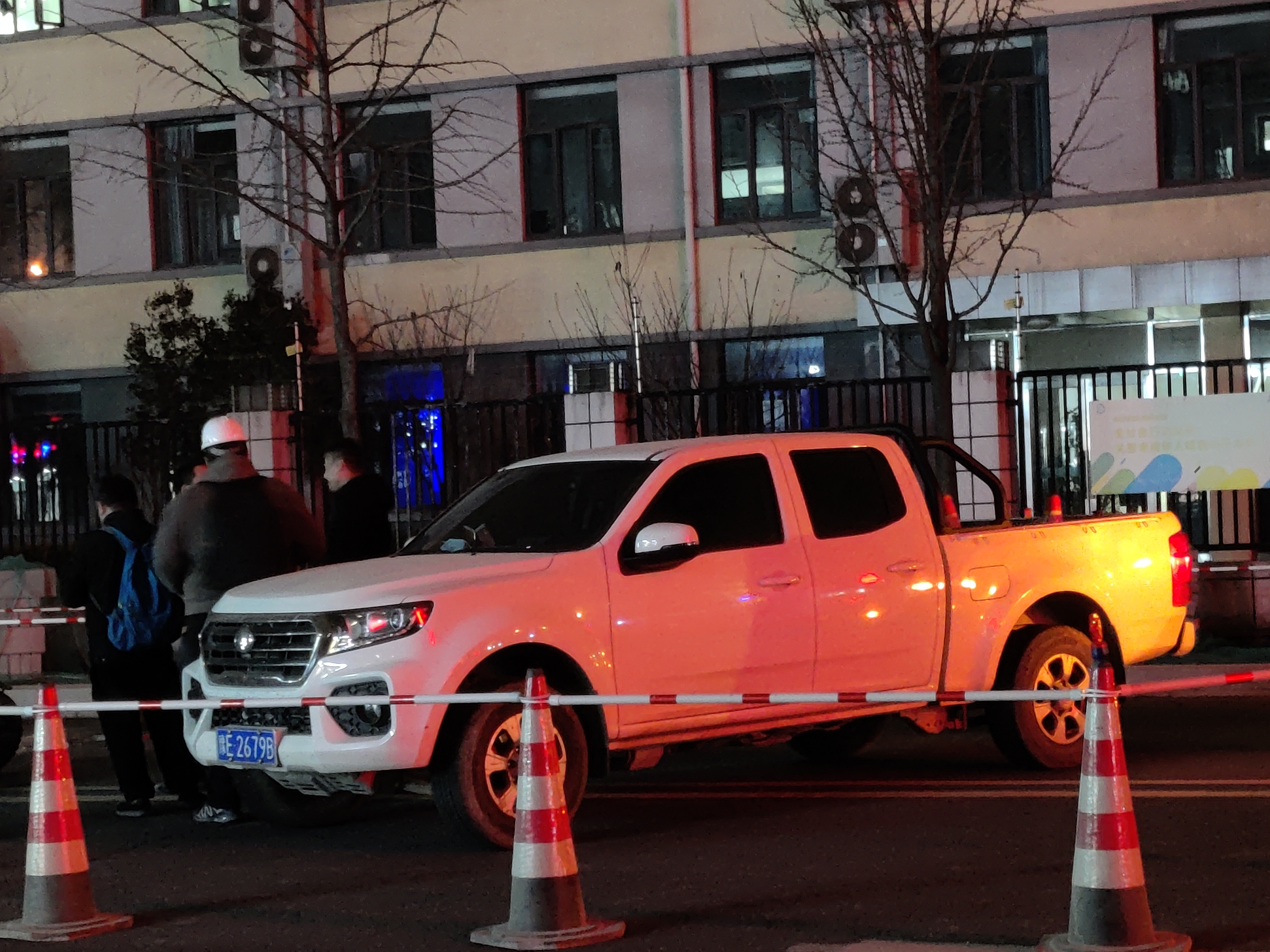
- Great Wall Wingle 7

Overview
- Manufacturer: Great Wall Motor
- Also called: Great Wall Steed; Great Wall V240; Great Wall V200; Great Wall Wingle 3 Great Wall Wingle 5 Great Wall Wingle 6 Great Wall Wingle 7 Diar Wingle (Iran)
- Production: 2006–present
- Assembly: China: Baoding (GWM); Bulgaria: Bahovitsa (Litex Motors); Iran: Golpayegan (Diar Automobile Company); Indonesia: Jakarta (National Assembler, 2008–2011)

Body and chassis
- Class: Full-size pickup truck
- Body style: 4-door crew cab (2006–Present); 2-door pickup truck (2006–2021)

Powertrain
- Engine: 2.2 L GW491QE I4 (petrol); 2.4 L 4G69 I4 (petrol); 2.0 L 4D20 I4 (turbo diesel); 2.8 L GW2.8TC I4 (diesel)
- Transmission: 6 speed manual 5 speed manual

Chronology
- Predecessor: Great Wall Sailor; Great Wall SoCool; Great Wall Deer

The Great Wall Wingle (also called the Great Wall Steed in some markets) is series of pickup trucks manufactured by the Chinese company Great Wall Motors since 2006. It was originally launched as a single pickup model, it has since been updated and facelifted multiple times with different variants offered at the same time.

== Wingle 3 (2006–2010) ==
The Great Wall Wingle 3 (Chinese: 长城风骏; pinyin: Chángchéng Fēngjùn), previously the Great Wall Wingle, is a compact pickup truck built and marketed by the Chinese automaker Great Wall Motors since December 2006. In 2009, it became the first Chinese-made ute or pickup to be sold in Australia, where it is marketed as the V-Series. It was also made available in Italy, with the model name Steed.

The body shell design heavily resembles earlier Isuzu/GM model which was sold as an Isuzu Rodeo. The steering wheels used in the truck are Toyota designs found in models like the Camry and Sienna.

=== Australian market ===
The Australian specification V240 (Wingle 3) came standard with a 2.4-liter four-cylinder petrol engine, producing 100 kW (134 hp) and 200 N⋅m (148 lbf⋅ft) of torque, which was supplied by the SAIC-Mitsubishi joint venture in Shanghai. The diesel engines are of Great Wall design and manufacture. The V240 was specified as standard with alloy wheels, AM/FM CD radio, electric windows, leather trimmed seats, disc/drum brakes and air-conditioning.

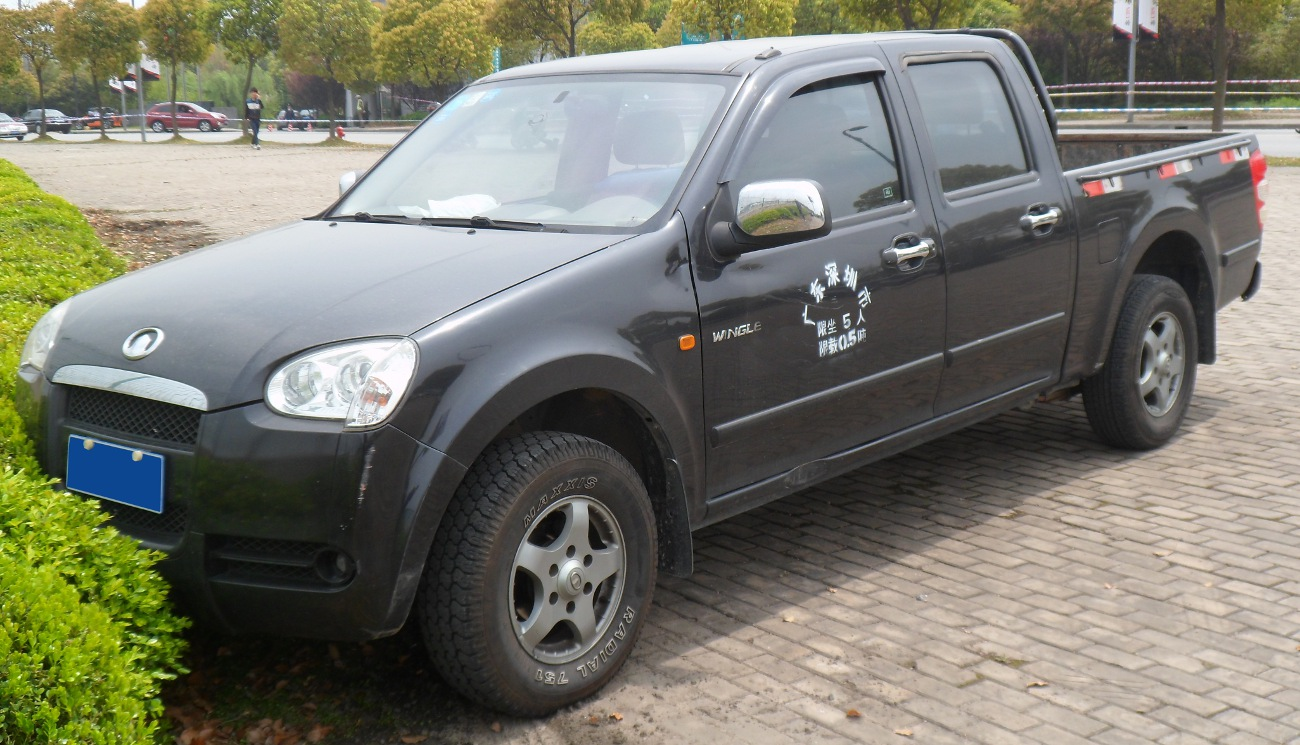
Great Wall Wingle 3

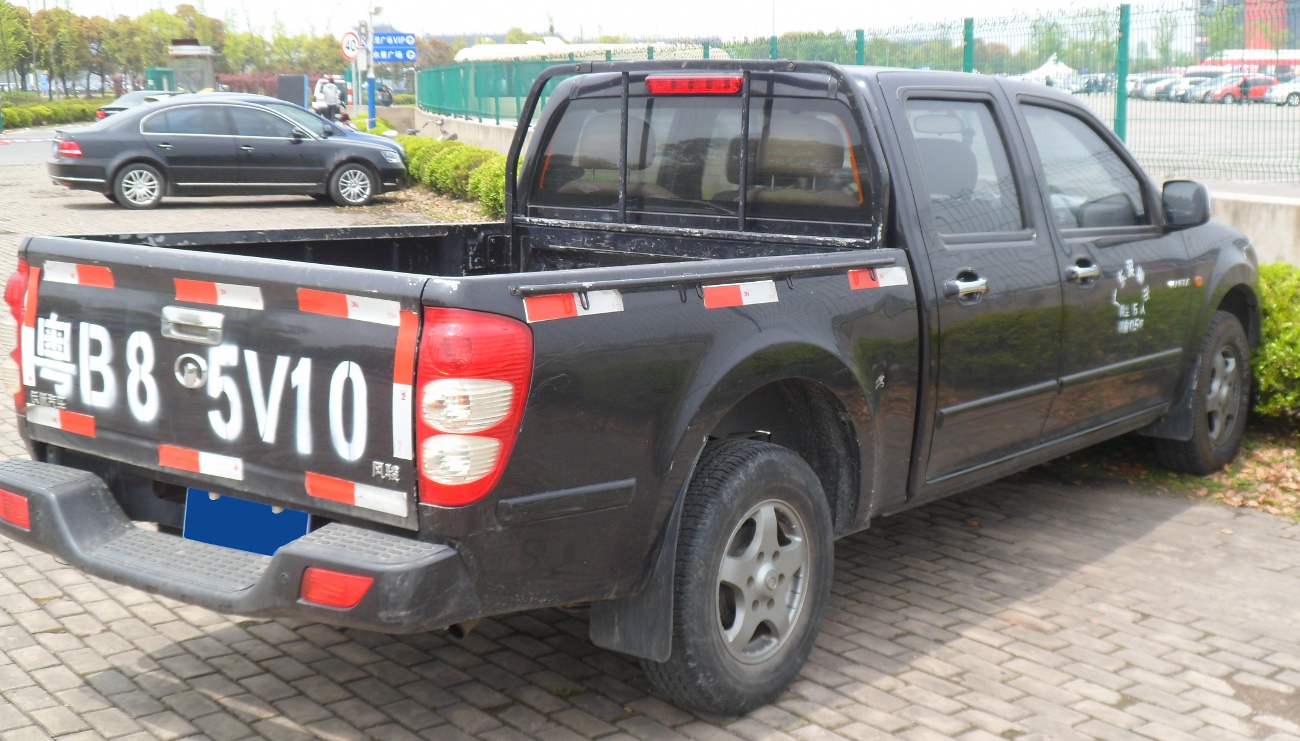
Great Wall Wingle 3 - Back end

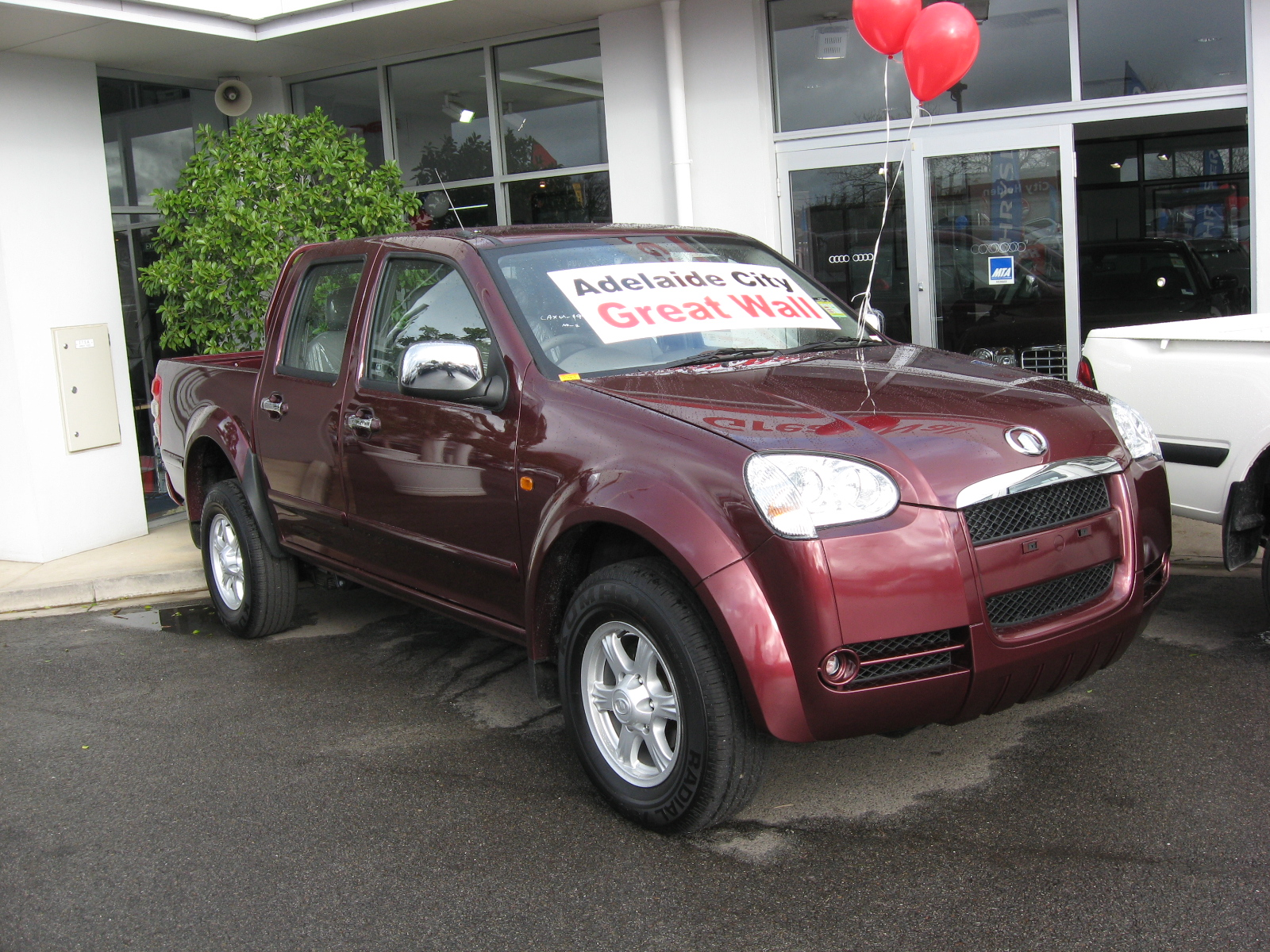
2009 Great Wall V240 (Wingle 3) front view (Australia)

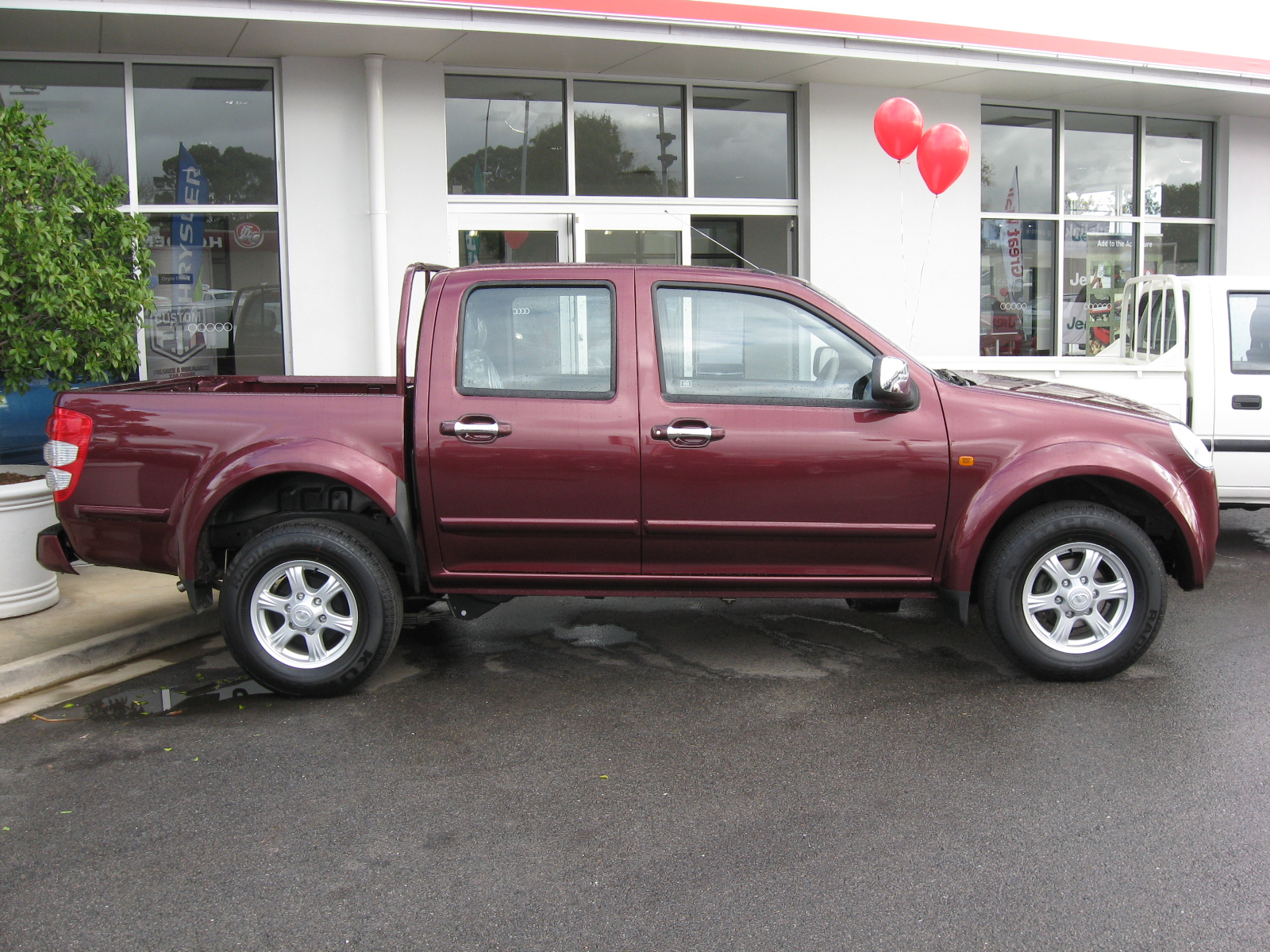
2009 Great Wall V240 (Wingle 3) side view (Australia)

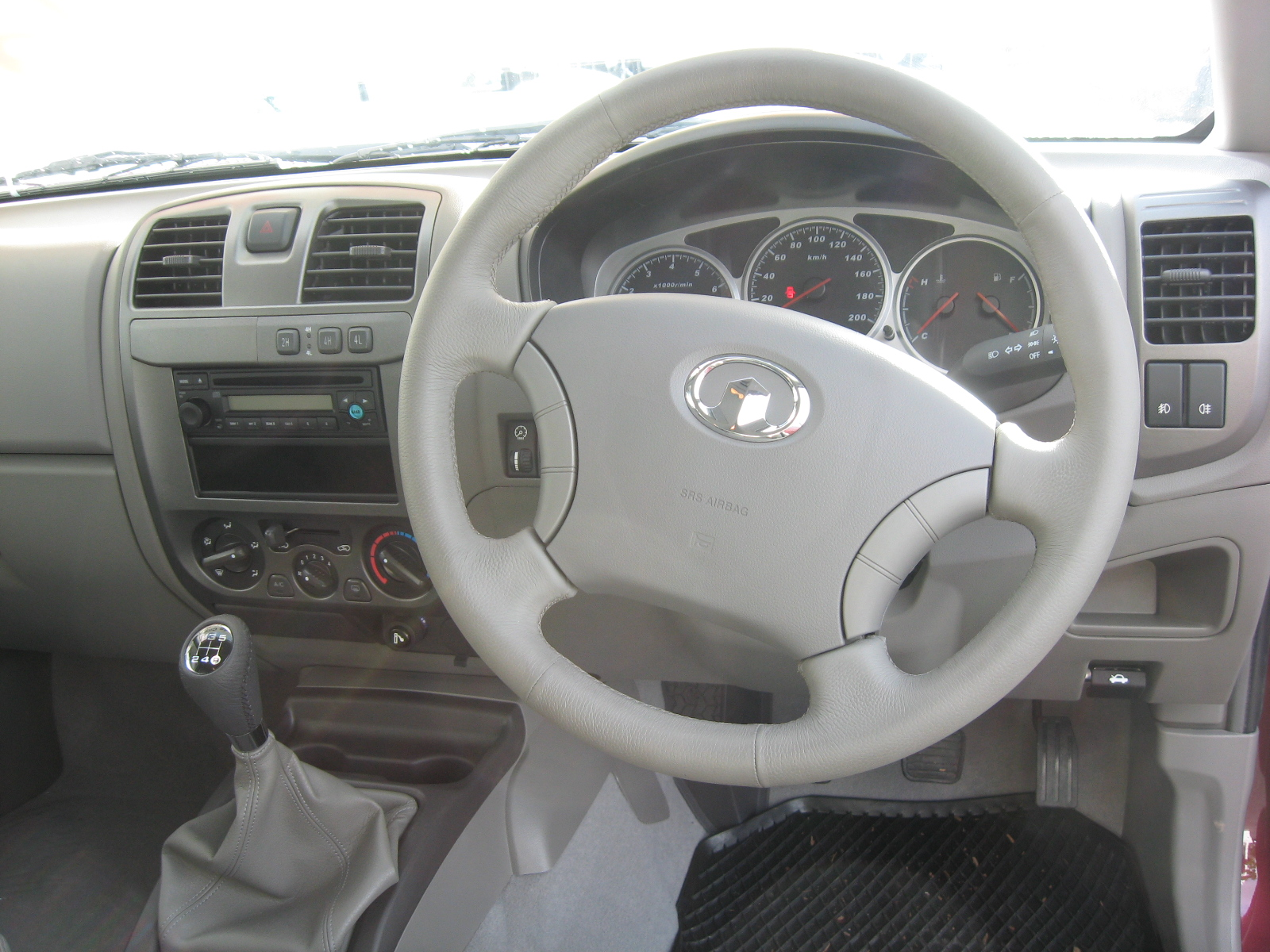
2009 Great Wall V240 (Wingle 3) interior (Australia)

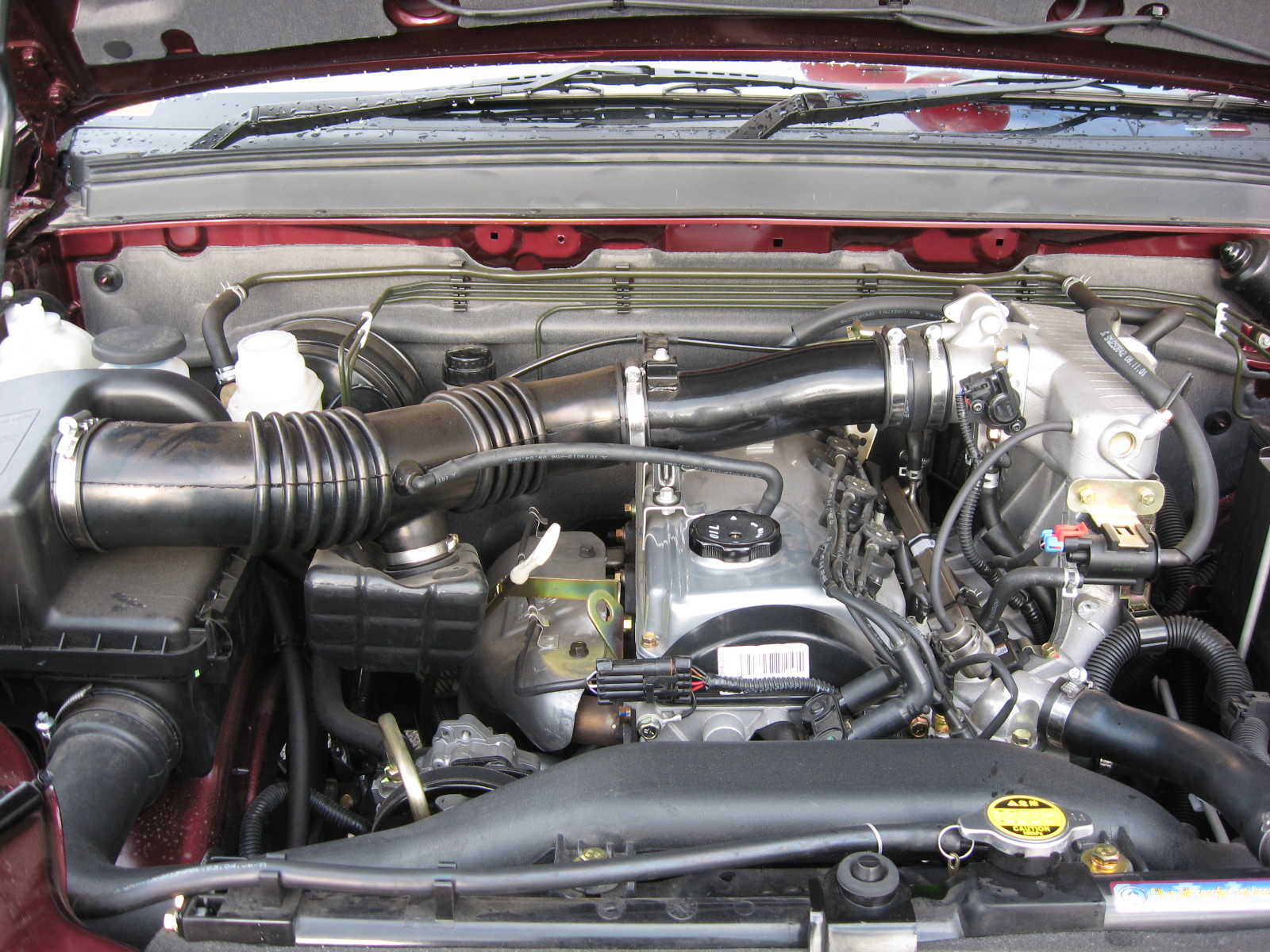
2009 Great Wall V240 (Wingle 3) engine (Australia)

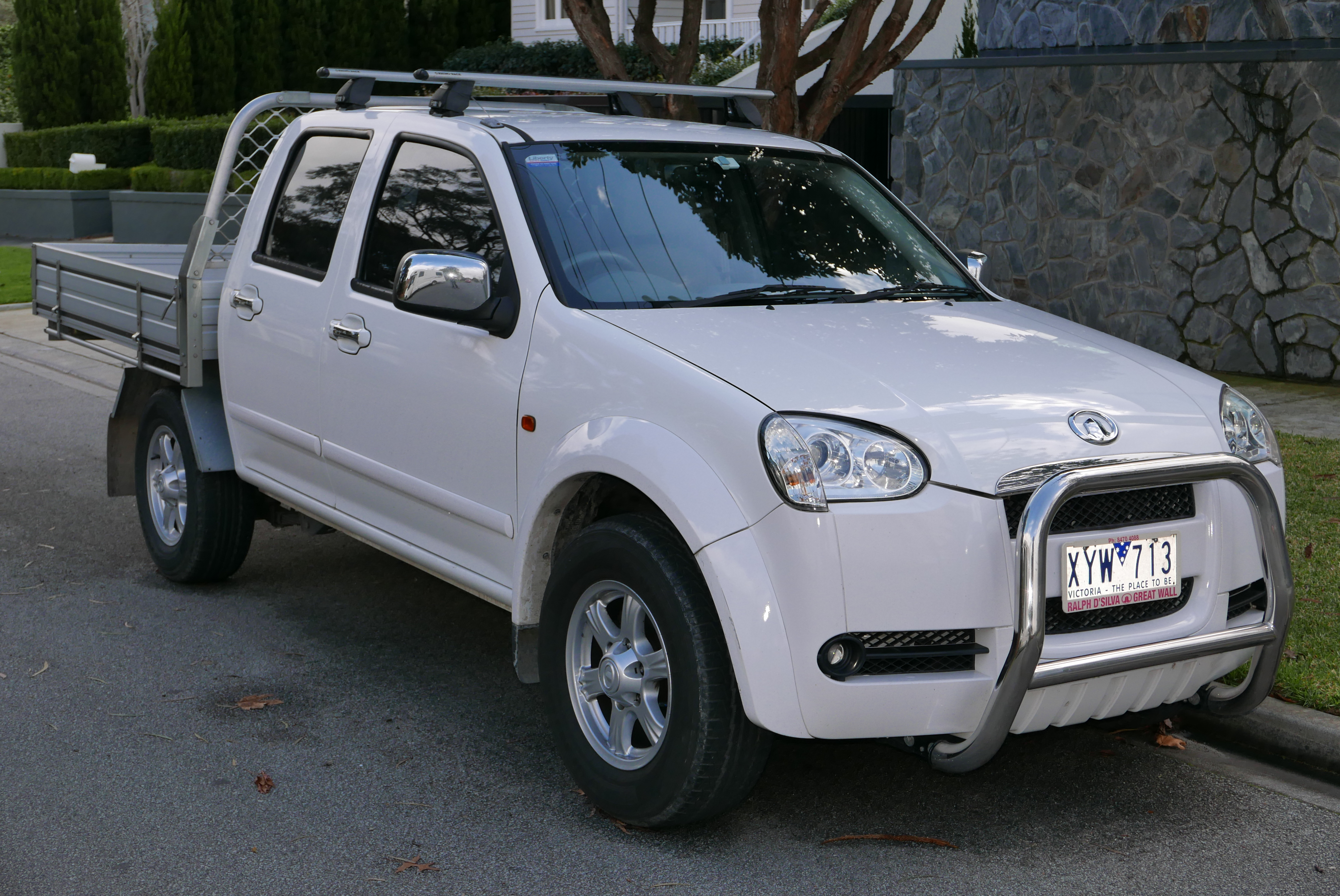
2010 Great Wall V240 4-door cab chassis (Australia)

== Wingle 5 (2010–present) ==
A new pickup named the Wingle 5 was released in March 2010 and the original was renamed Wingle 3. It is available with a new 2L turbodiesel engine developing 105 kW (141 hp) and 305 N⋅m (225 lb⋅ft). It was marketed as the Great Wall Steed in the United Kingdom, with sales beginning in 2012. It was the first Chinese vehicle to be sold in the country. In 2017, the Great Wall Steed was no longer sold in the United Kingdom. In Italy is the Wingle still available with the name Steed with a 2.4 GPL engine https://www.greatwall.it/pick-up-steed/

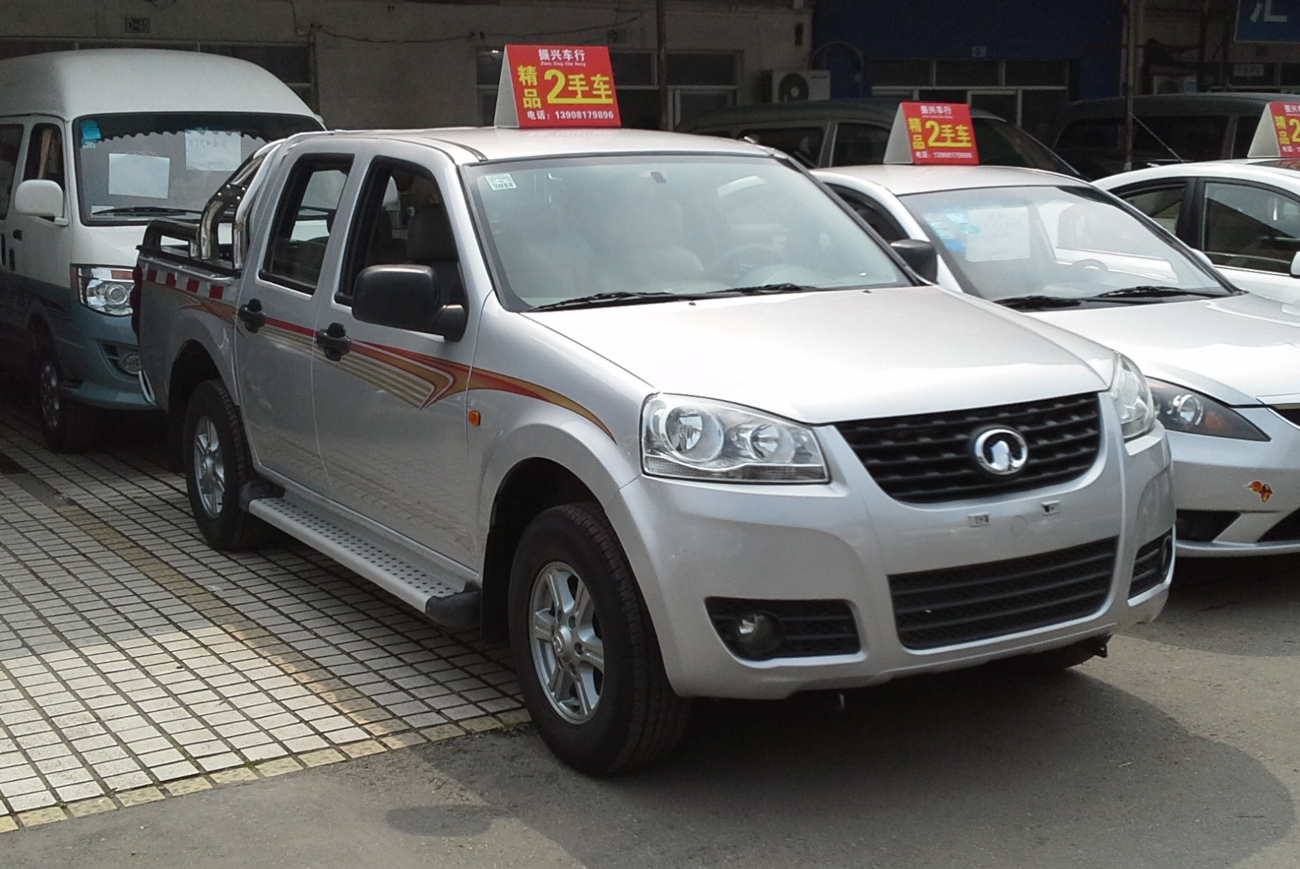
Great Wall Wingle 5 (pre-facelift)

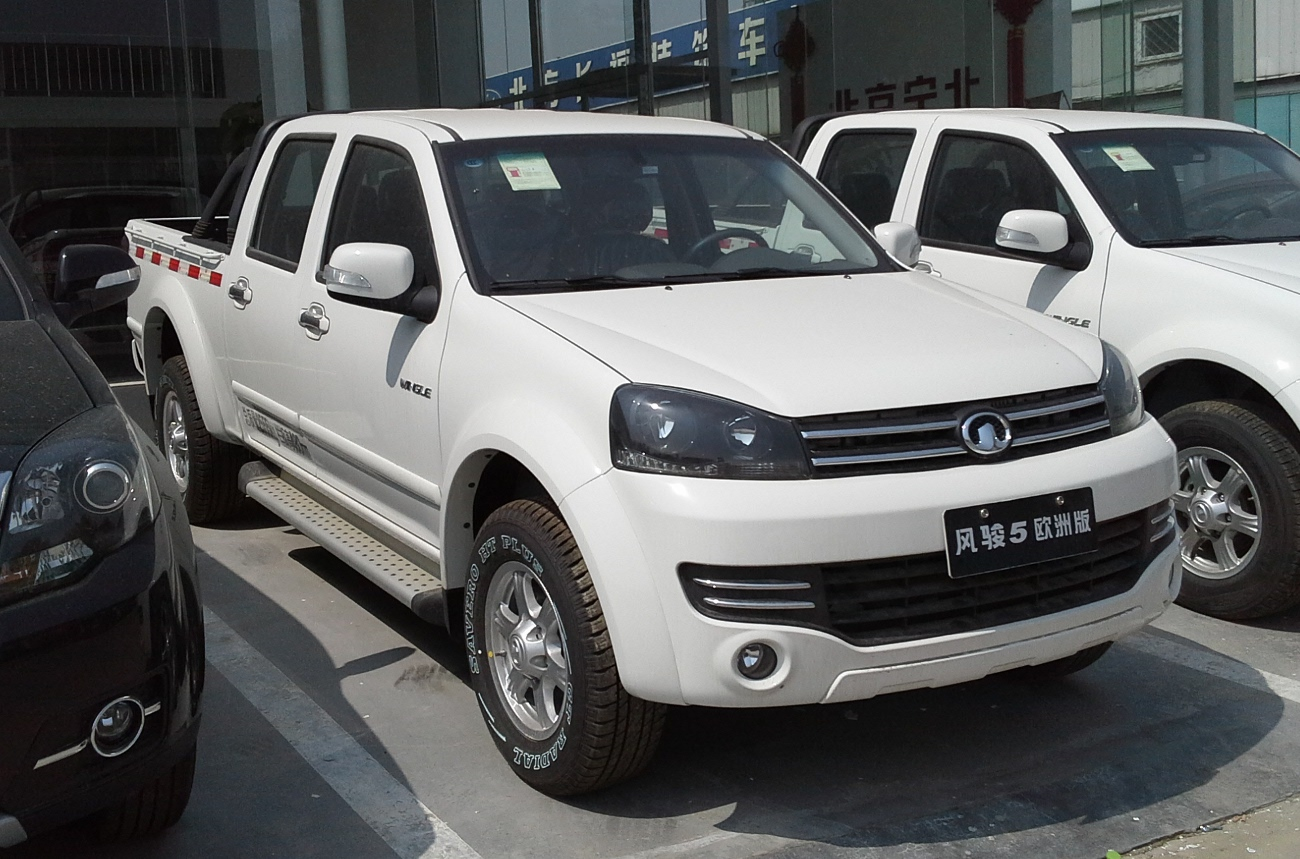
Great Wall Wingle 5 European Edition

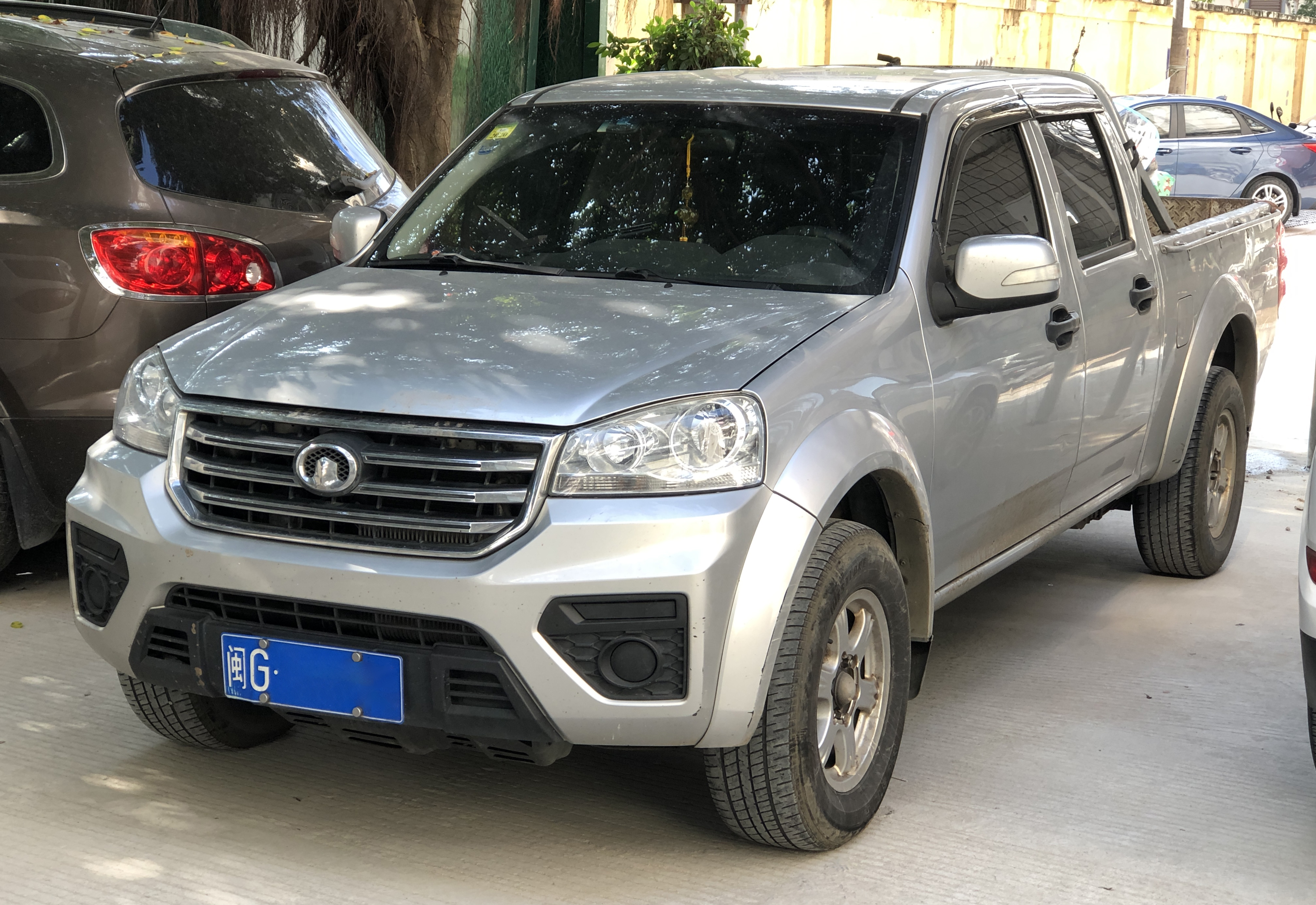
Great Wall Wingle 5 (first facelift)

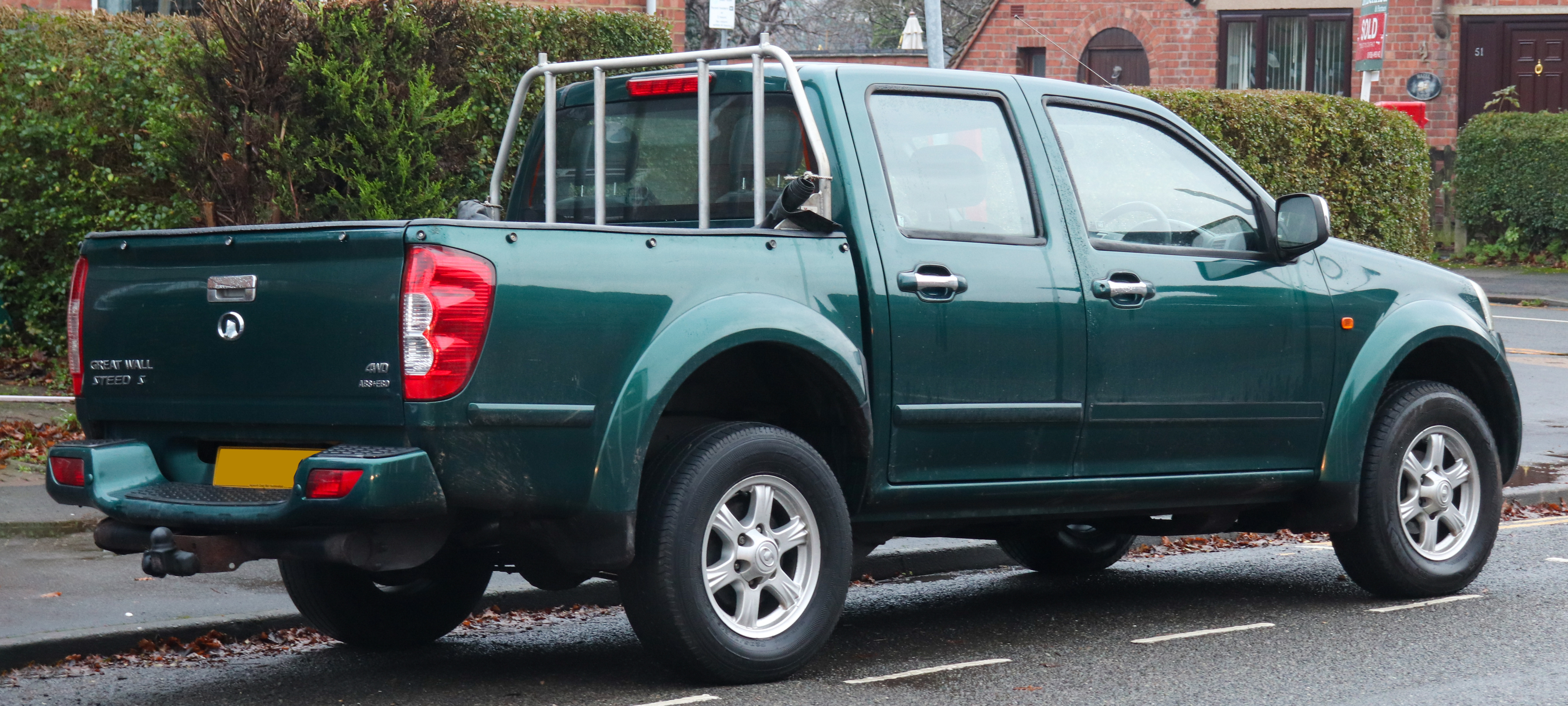
Great Wall Steed S rear end

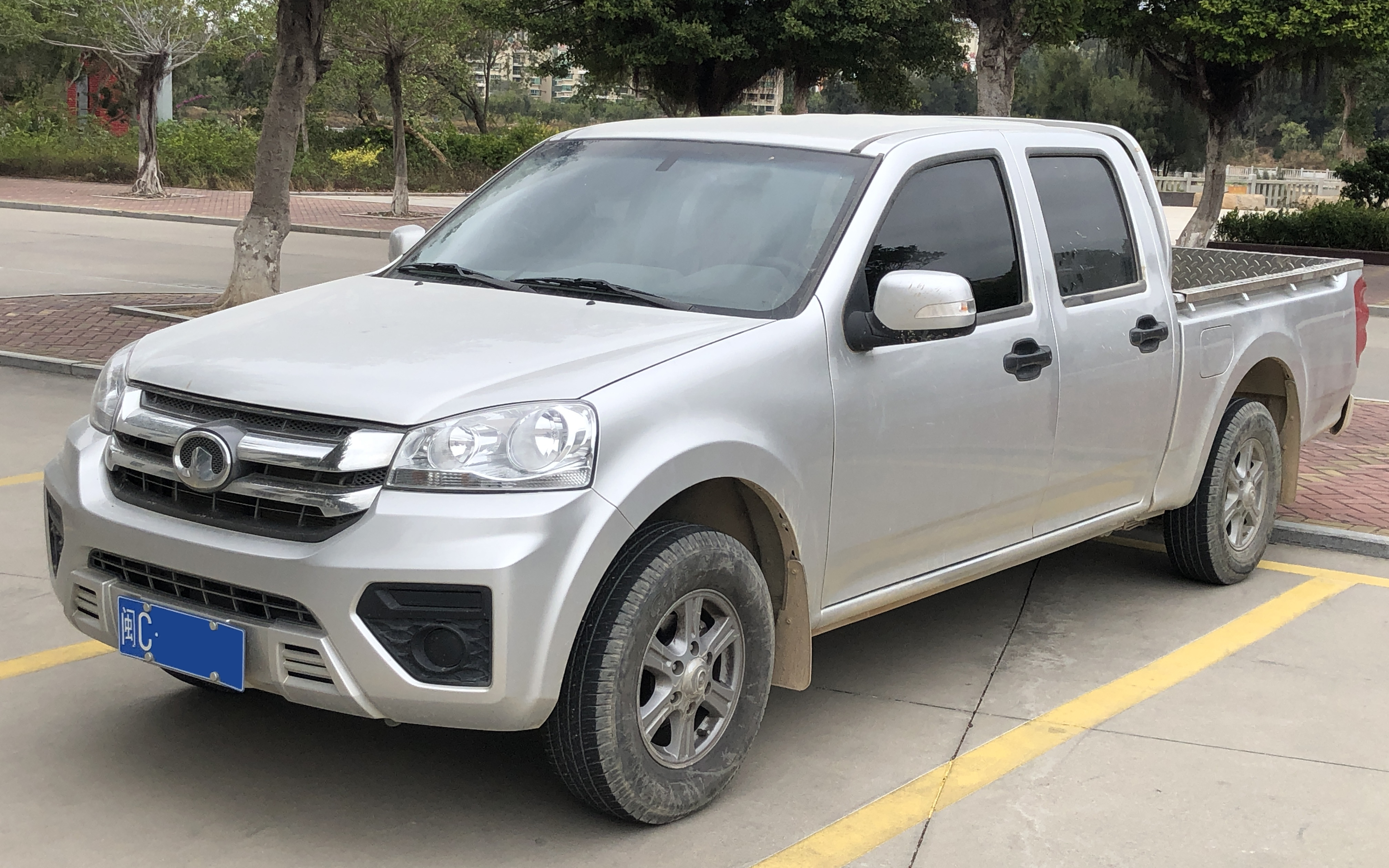
Great Wall Wingle 5 (second facelift)

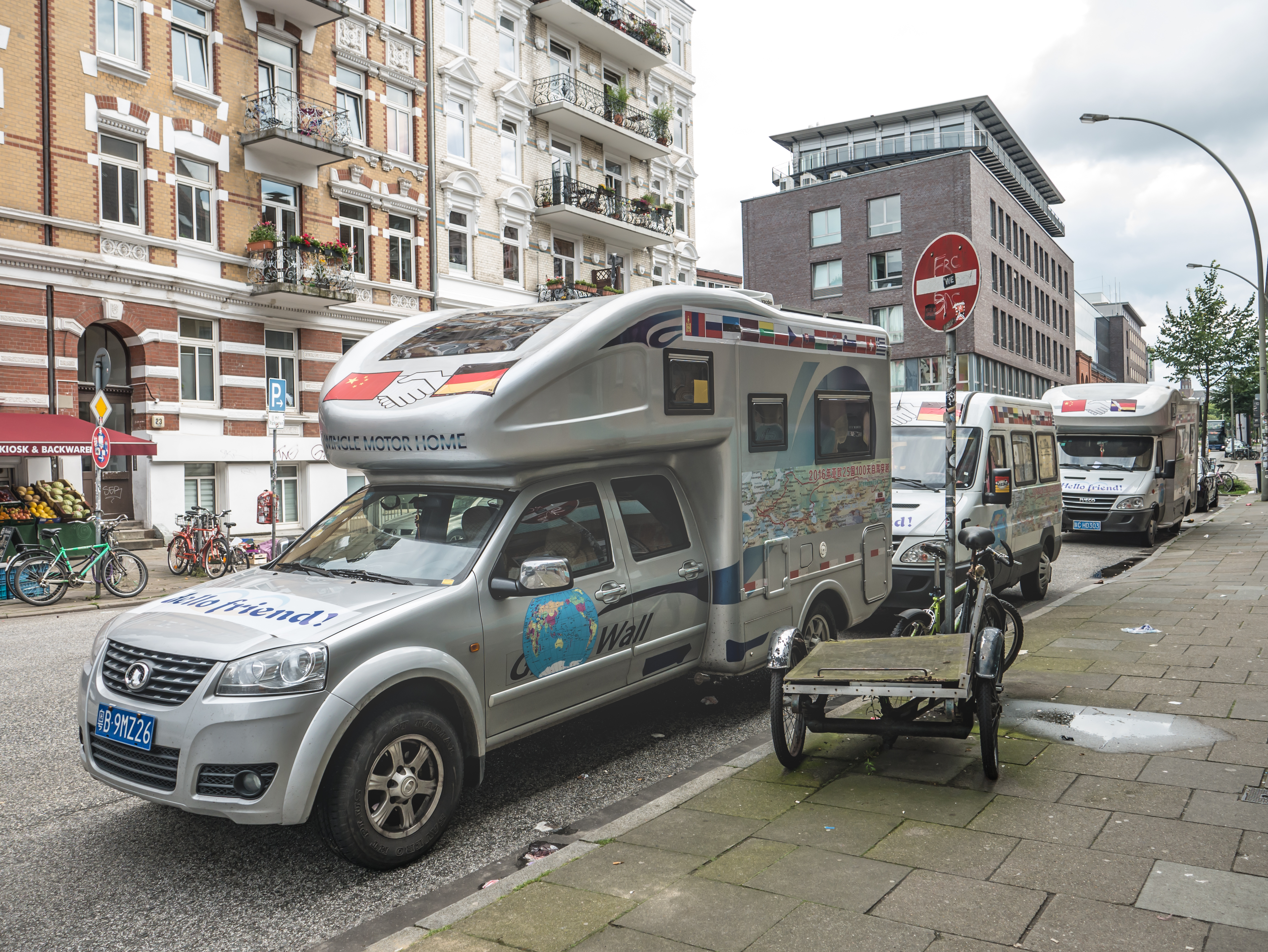
A Great Wall Wingle 5 recreational vehicle (China)

=== Australian market ===
In Australia, the Wingle 5 remained marketed as the V240. In 2010, a single-cab model was released which, in the Australian market, replaced the SA220 (Great Wall Sailor). In 2011, the dual-cab V240 was upgraded to the newly released Wingle 5.

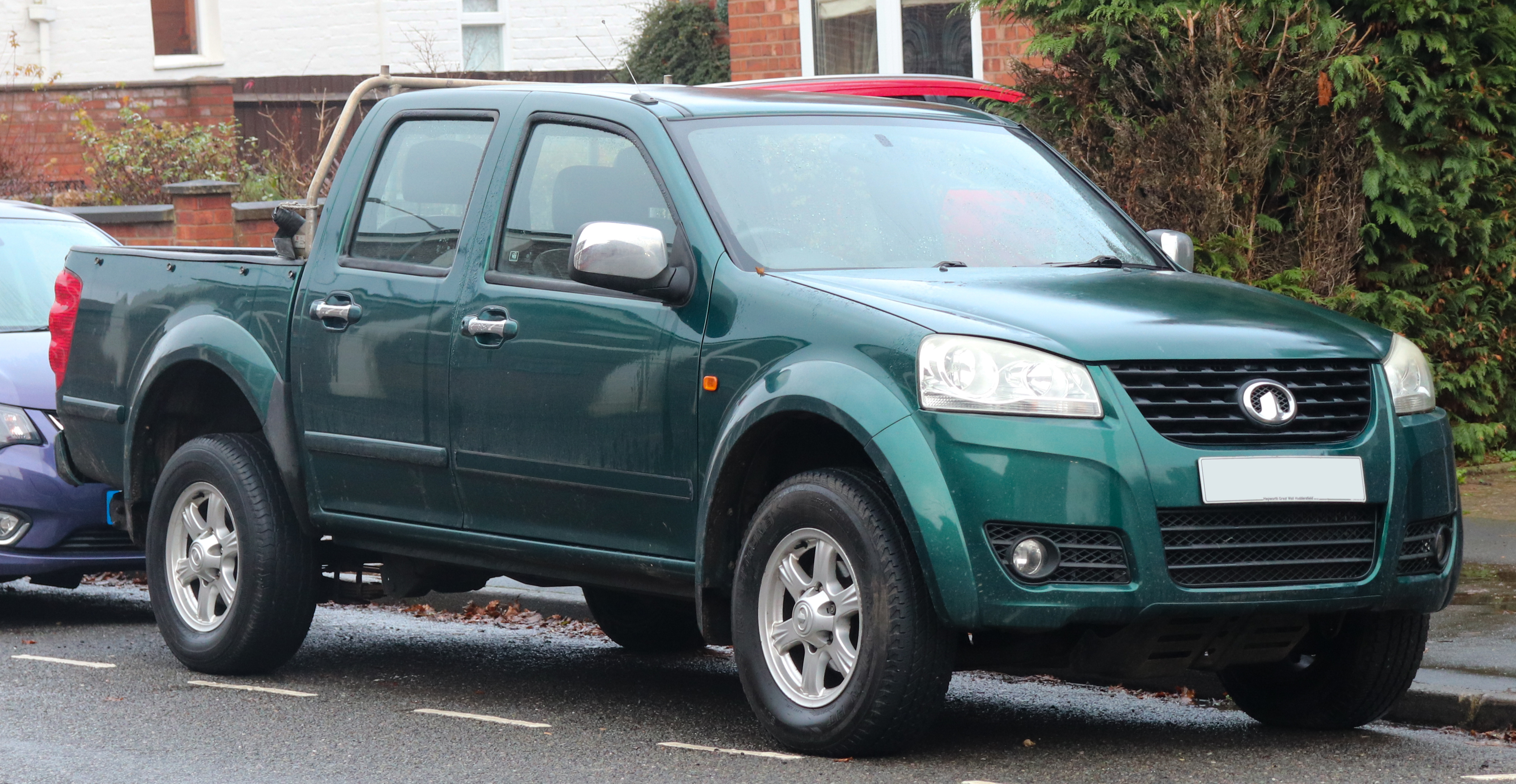
Pre-facelift Great Wall Steed S 4X4

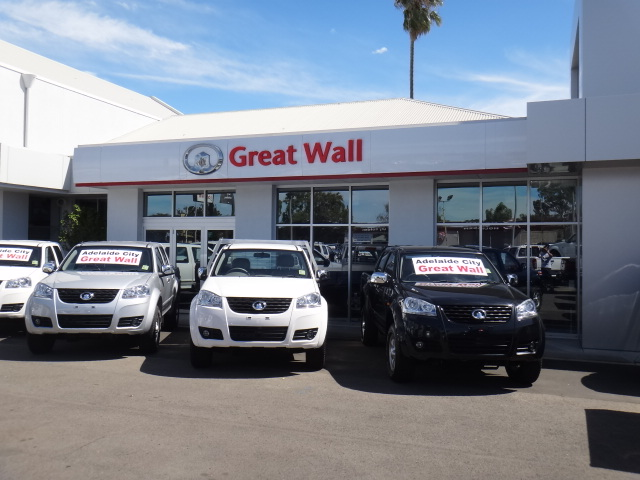
Great Wall V240 (Australia)

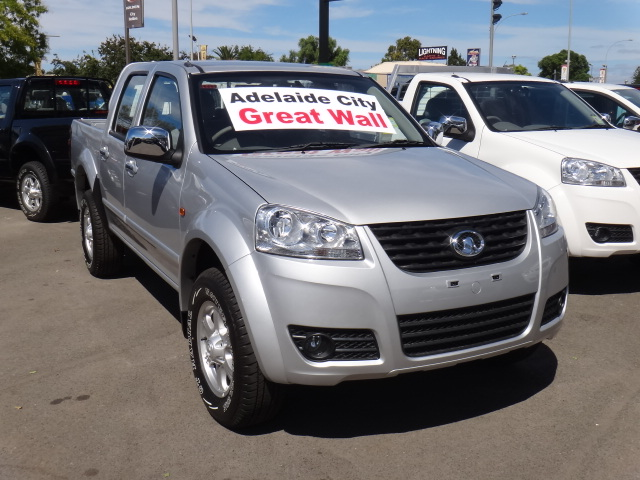
Great Wall V240 (Australia)

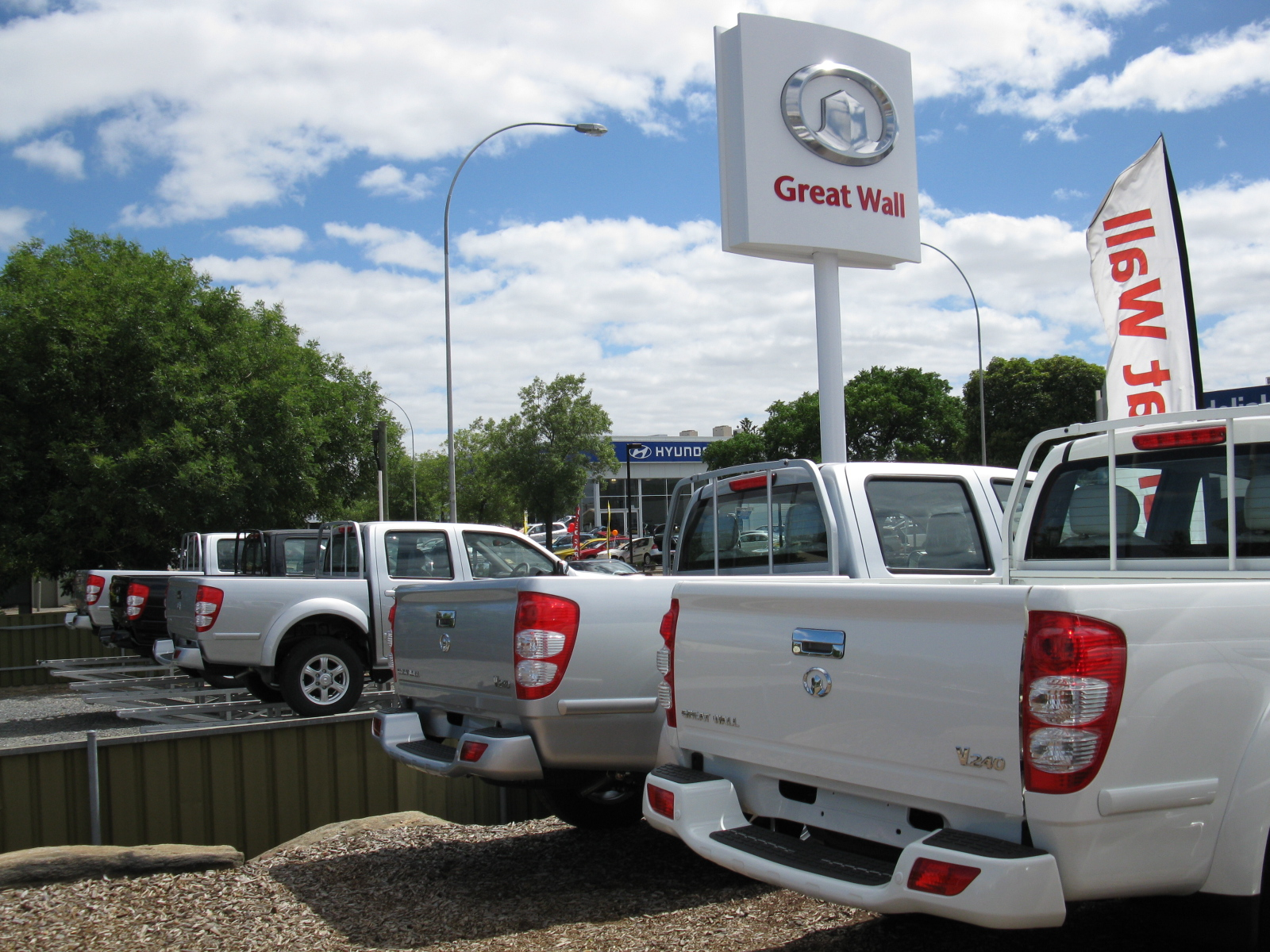
Great Wall V240 (Australia)

=== Ukraine market ===
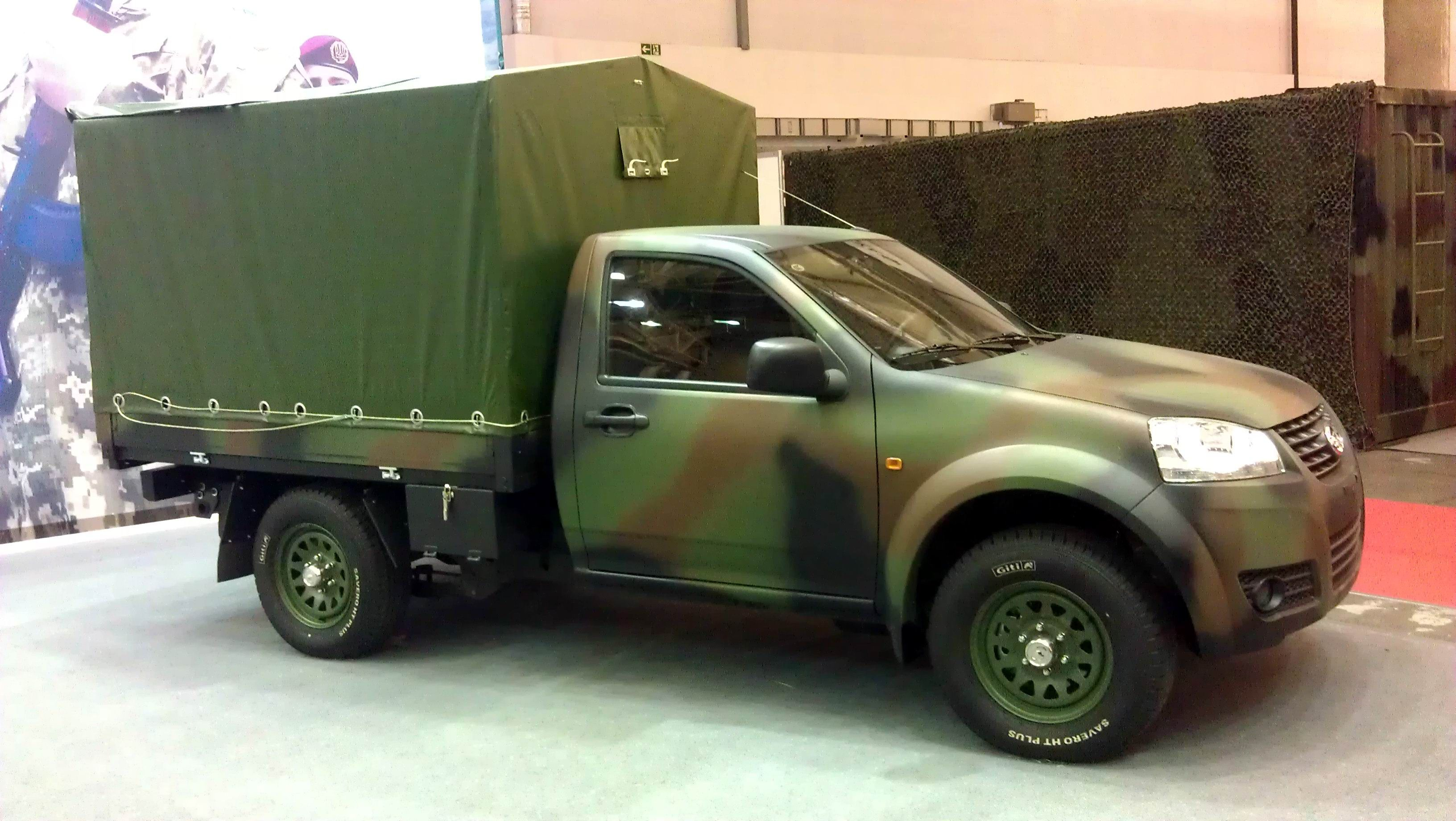
A Great Wall Wingle 5 military truck (Bogdan)

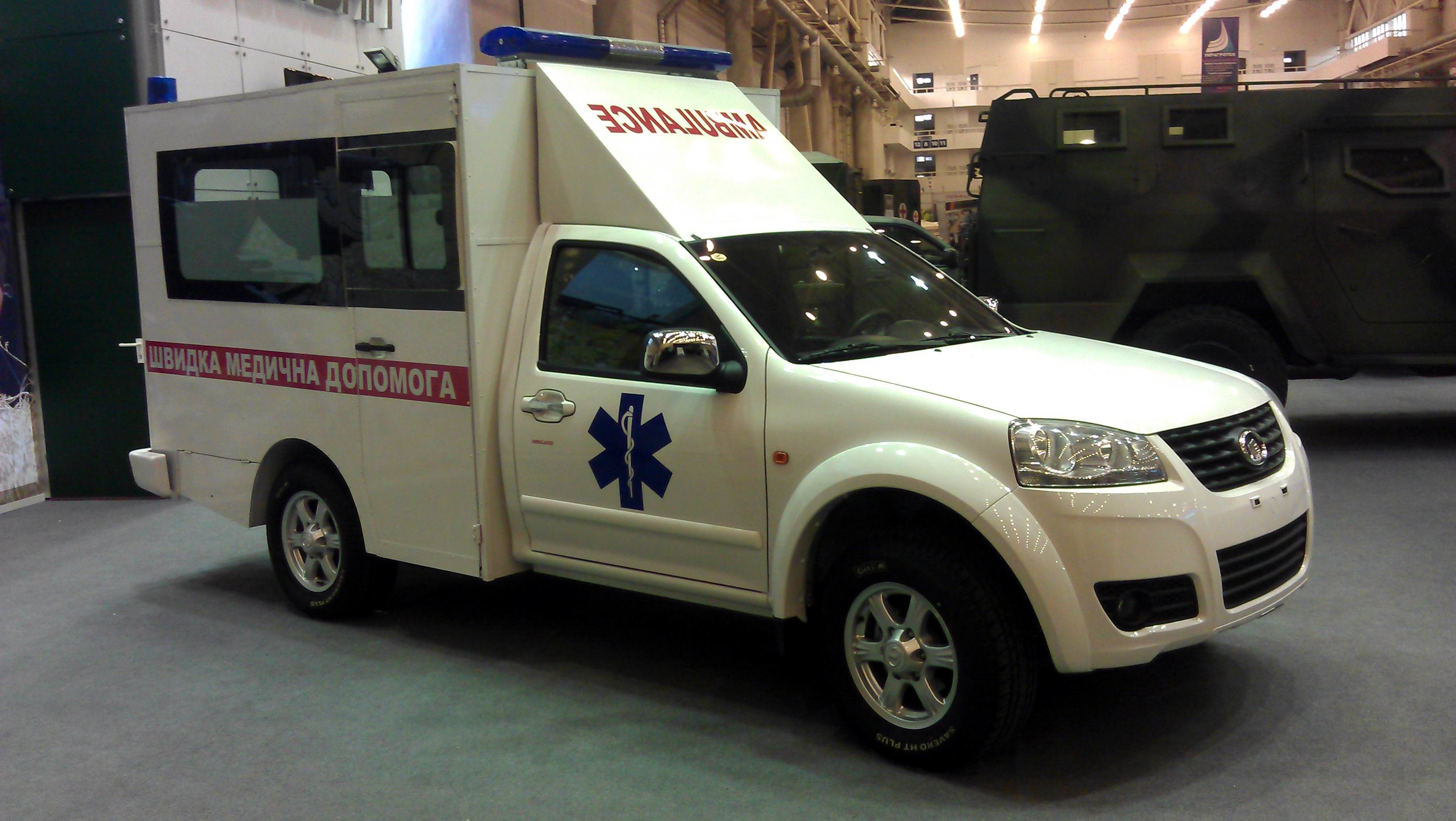
A Great Wall Wingle 5 ambulance (Bogdan)

=== Safety ===
The African version of the Steed 5 with no airbags and no ABS received 0 stars for adult occupants and 1 star for toddlers from Global NCAP 1.0 in 2020 (similar to Latin NCAP 2013).

Global NCAP 1.0 test results (South Africa) Great Wall Steed 5 – No Airbags (2020, similar to Latin NCAP 2013)
Test	Score	Stars
Adult occupant protection	0.00/17.00	0 /5 stars
Child occupant protection	12.00/49.00	1 /5 stars

The Chinese-made Wingle 5 in its most basic version for Latin America with 2 airbags, no pretensioners, and no ESC obtained 0 stars from Latin NCAP 3.0 in 2021 (similar to Euro NCAP 2014).

Latin NCAP 3.0 test results Great Wall Motors Wingle 5 + 2 Airbags (2021, similar to Euro NCAP 2014)
Test	Points	%
Overall:	0 /5 stars	
Adult occupant:	3.72	9%
Child occupant:	0.00	0%
Pedestrian:	9.35	19%
Safety assist:	0.00	0%

The Great Wall V240 received 2 out of 5 stars in ANCAP testing.

ANCAP test results GWM V240 (2009)
Test	Score
Overall	2 /5 stars
Frontal offset	2.36/16
Side impact	16/16
Pole	Not Assessed
Seat belt reminders	0/3
Whiplash protection	Not Assessed
Pedestrian protection	Poor
Electronic stability control	Not Available

ANCAP test results GWM V20 (2011)
Test	Score
Overall	3 /5 stars
Frontal offset	6.07/16
Side impact	16/16
Pole	Not Assessed
Seat belt reminders	0/3
Whiplash protection	Not Assessed
Pedestrian protection	Poor
Electronic stability control	Not Available

== Wingle 6 (2014–2021) ==
In April 2014, the new Wingle 6 was introduced, featuring amongst other things LED headlights, a rear differential lock, reversing camera and parking sensors, and a tire pressure monitoring system. It is powered by the same 2.0-liter diesel and 2.4-liter petrol engines as the Wingle 5.

The updated Wingle 6 was released in Australia in 2017, with only the 2.0 L diesel engine available.

As of 2021, production has ended on the Wingle 6.

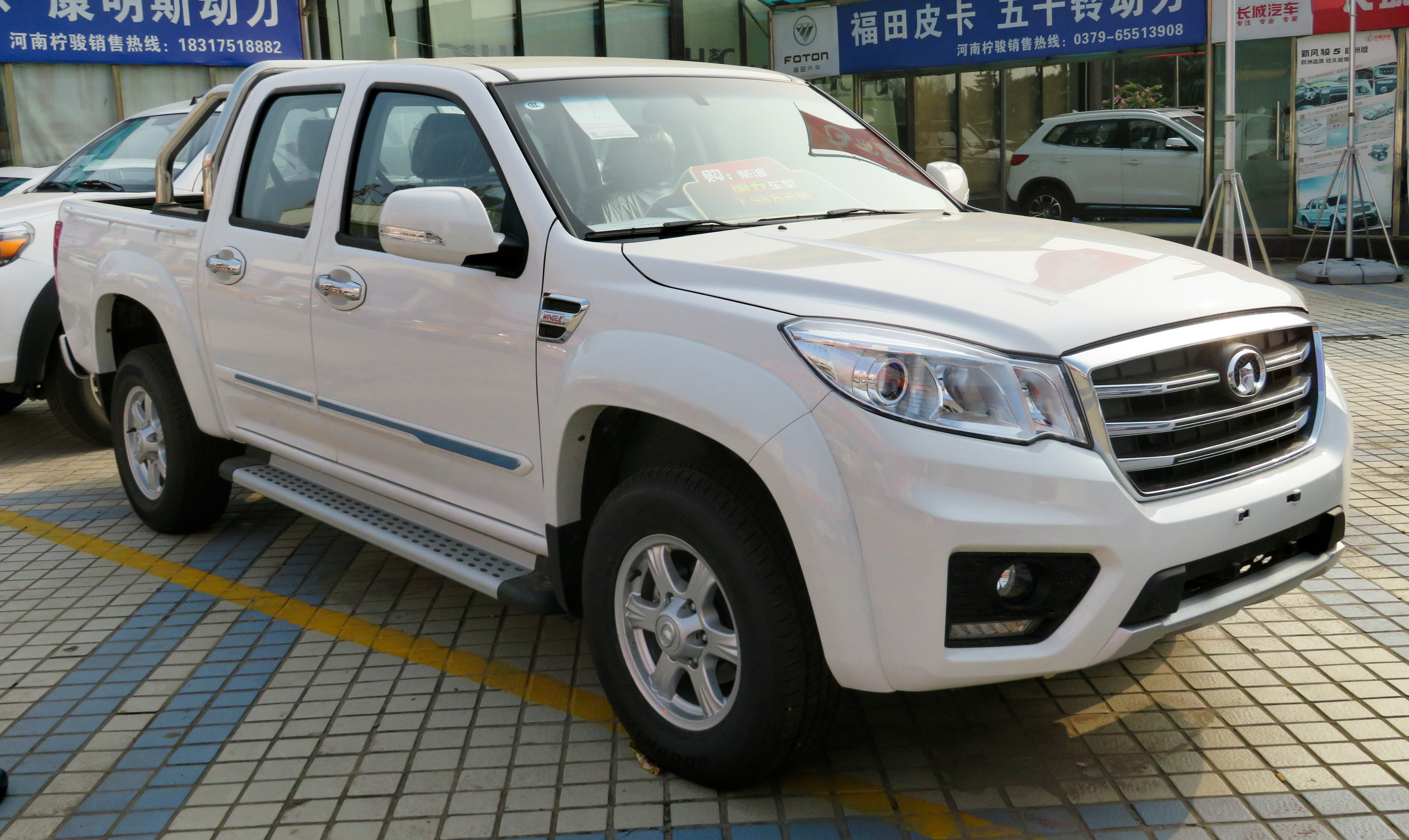
2018 Great-Wall Wingle 6 front

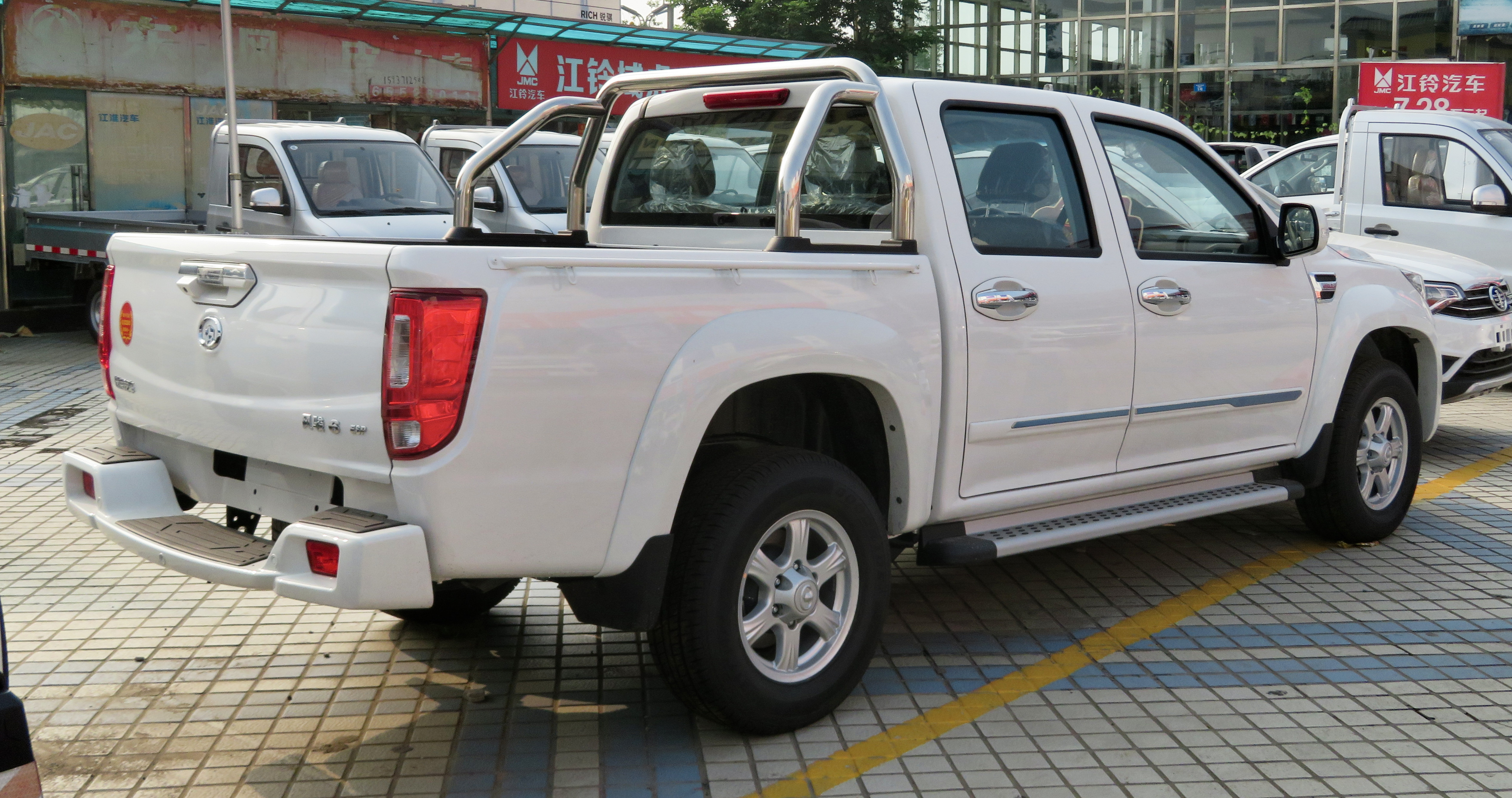
2018 Great-Wall Wingle 6 back

=== Safety ===
ANCAP test results GWM Steed (2016)
Test	Score
Overall	2 /5 stars
Frontal offset	8.30/16
Side impact	16/16
Pole	Not Assessed
Seat belt reminders	2/3
Whiplash protection	Marginal
Pedestrian protection	Not Assessed
Electronic stability control	Standard

== Wingle 7 (2018–present) ==
Great Wall Wingle 7
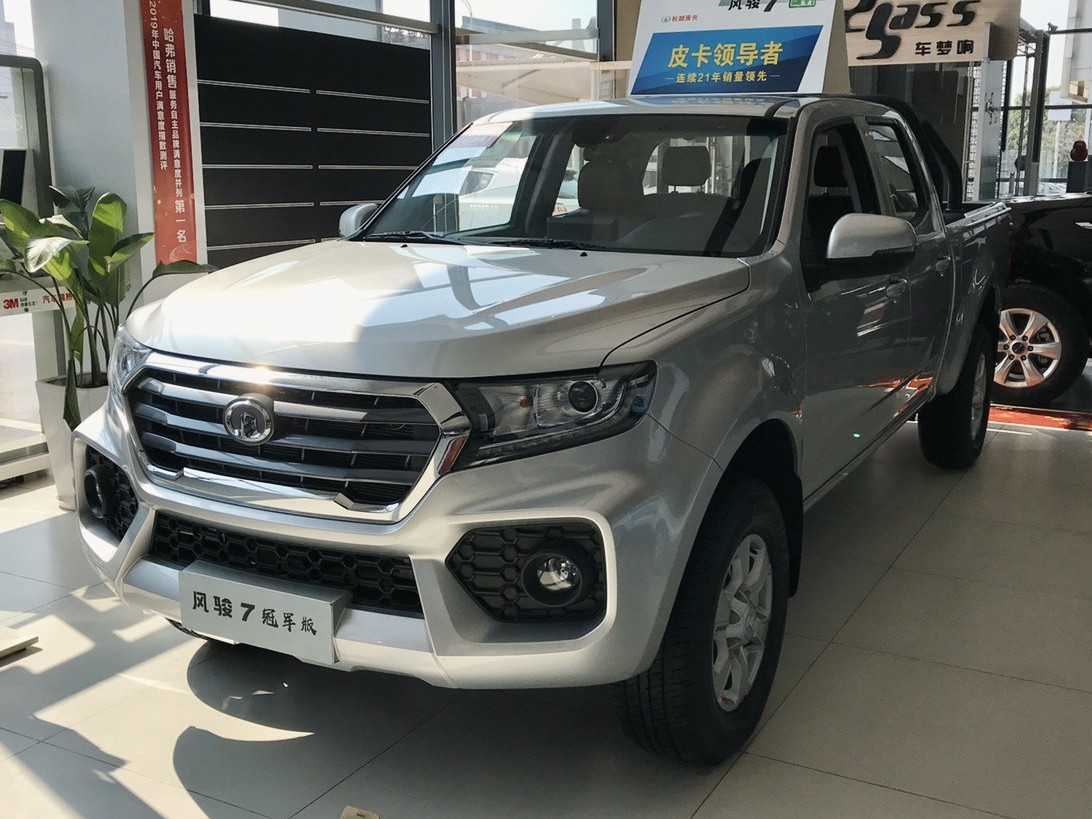
- Great Wall Wingle 7

Overview
- Manufacturer: Great Wall Motors
- Production: 2018–Present
- Assembly: China: Baoding (GWM)

Body and chassis
- Body style: 4-door crew cab

Powertrain
- Engine: 2.0 L GW4D20D I4 (turbo diesel)
- Transmission: 6 speed manual

Dimensions
- Wheelbase: 3,350 mm (131.9 in); 3,090 mm (121.7 in) (SWB)
- Length: 5,395–5,425 mm (212.4–213.6 in); 5,095 mm (200.6 in) (SWB)
- Width: 1,800 mm (70.9 in)
- Height: 1,740–1,760 mm (68.5–69.3 in)
- Curb weight: 1,740 kg (3,836 lb)

Chronology
- Predecessor: Great Wall Wingle 6

The Wingle series received a new variant with a major update called the Wingle 7 in 2018. The Wingle 7 is a full-size pickup truck manufactured by the Chinese company Great Wall Motors since 2018. The Wingle 7 is offered as a standard bed model with short wheel base and a long bed variant with long wheel base. The Wingle 7 is only available with a 2.0 liter GW4D20D diesel engine producing a maximum output of 107 kW (143 hp) and 315 N⋅m (232 lb⋅ft) mated to a 6-speed manual transmission with four wheel drive available.

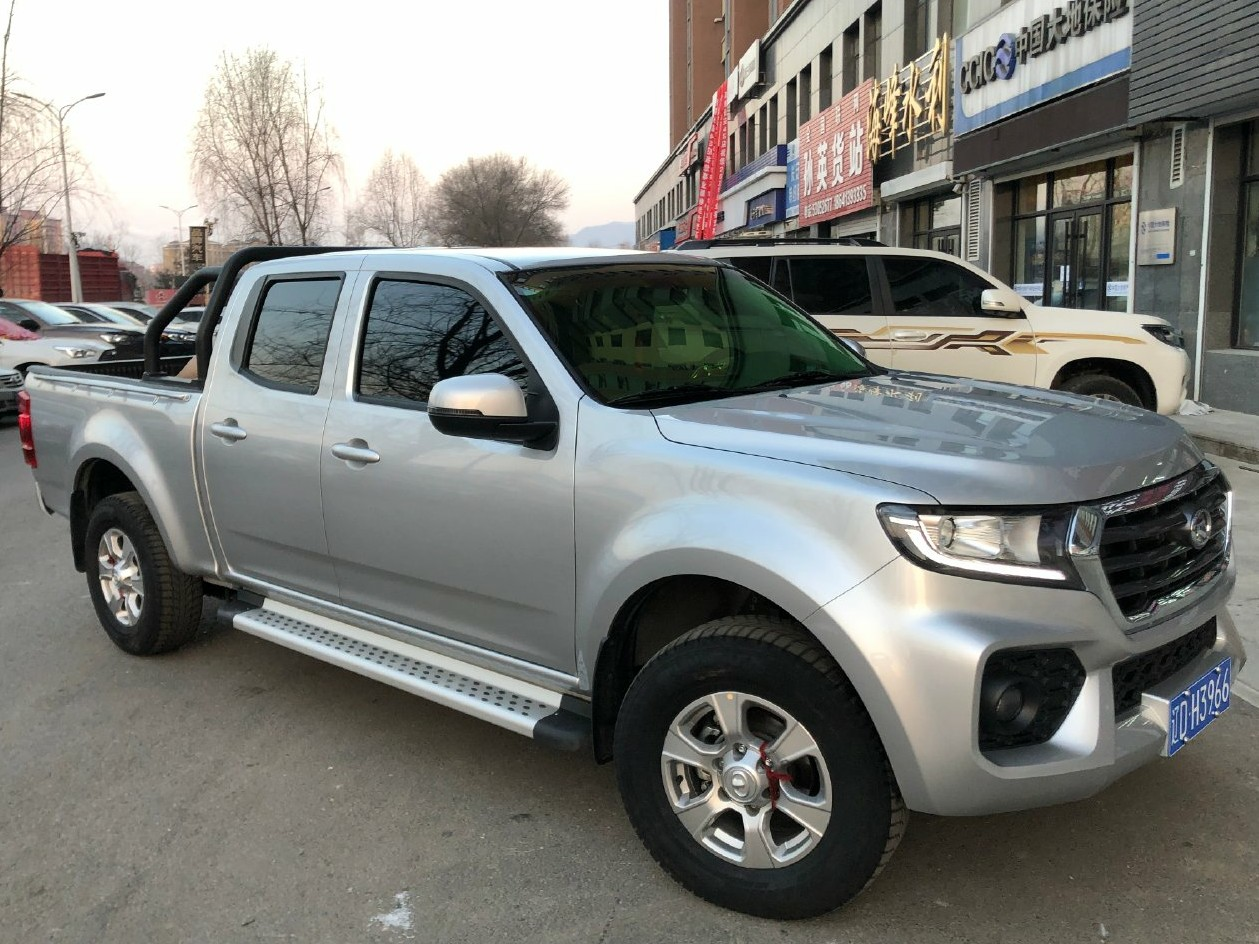
front

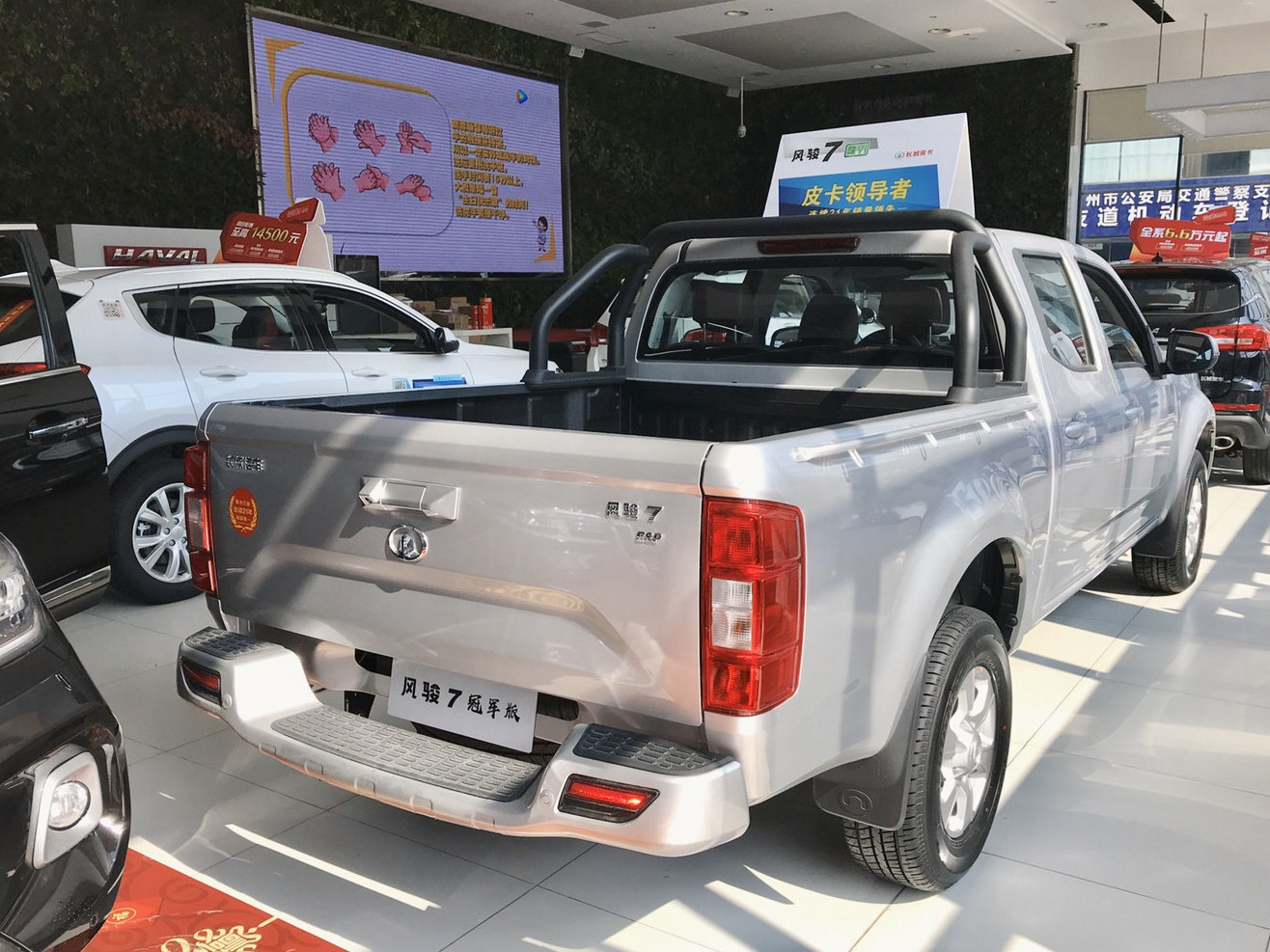
rear
