= Great Wall Sailor =

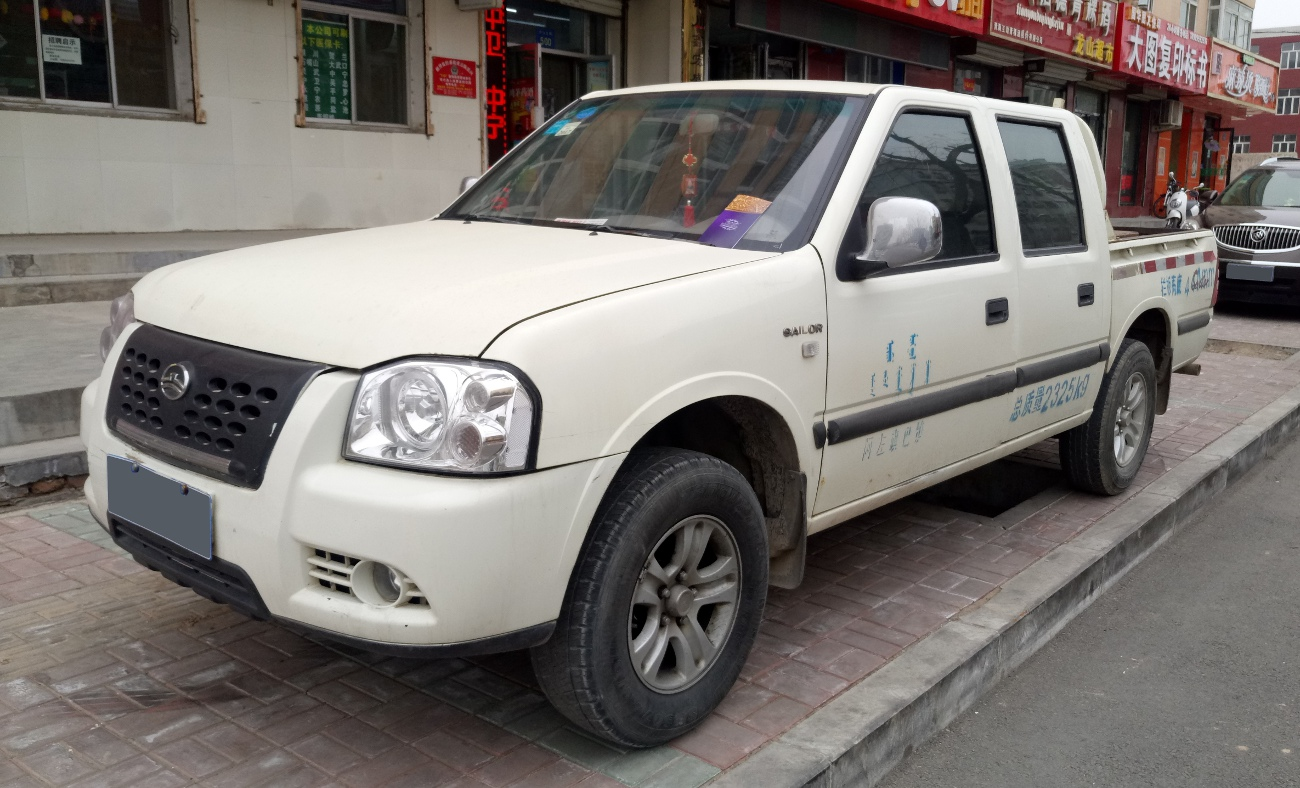

Overview
- Manufacturer: Great Wall Motors
- Also called: GWM SA220
- Production: 2001–2010
- Assembly: Baoding

Body and chassis
- Class: Full-size pickup truck
- Body style: 4-door crew cab 2-door pickup truck
- Related: Great Wall Sing; Isuzu Rodeo; Isuzu MU; Isuzu Faster

Powertrain
- Engine: 2.2L GW491QE I4 (petrol)
- Transmission: 5-speed manual

Dimensions
- Length: 202.2 in (5,135 mm)
- Width: 66.5 in (1,690 mm)
- Height: 67.1 in (1,705 mm)
- Curb weight: 1,640 kg (3,616 lb)–1,760 kg (3,880 lb)

Chronology
- Successor: Great Wall Wingle

The Great Wall Sailor (Chinese: 长城賽鈴; pinyin: Chángchéng Sàilíng) is a full-size pickup truck produced by Great Wall Motors from 2001 to 2010.

== Overview ==
The Sailor was powered by a 2.2-liter inline-four petrol engine producing 105 hp (78 kW) and 140 lb⋅ft (190 N⋅m).

As the pickup version of the Great Wall Sing, the body of the Great Wall Sing was the third generation Isuzu Faster produced under license with a redesigned front end heavily resembling a Nissan Paladin/Frontier. The Great Wall Sailor was later replaced by the Great Wall Wingle built on the same platform.

In 2009 the Sailor was introduced in Australia as the Great Wall SA220, only available in two-wheel drive. It was discontinued in 2010.

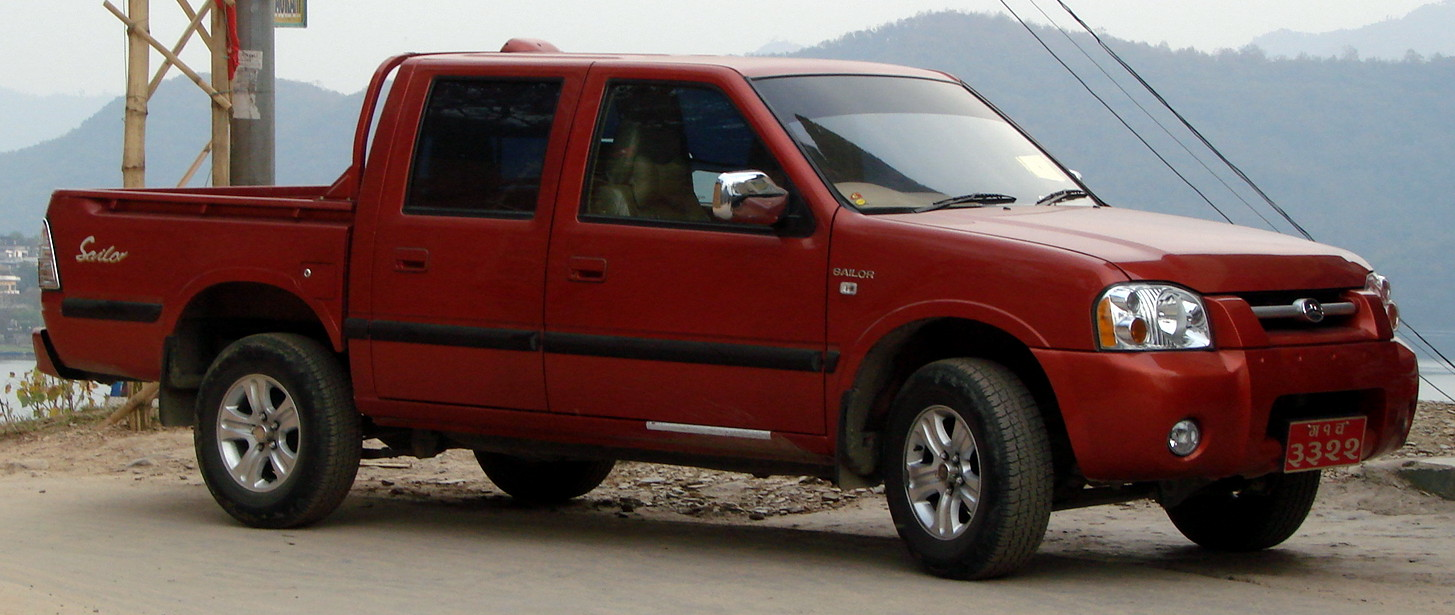
The front view of the Great Wall Sailor.

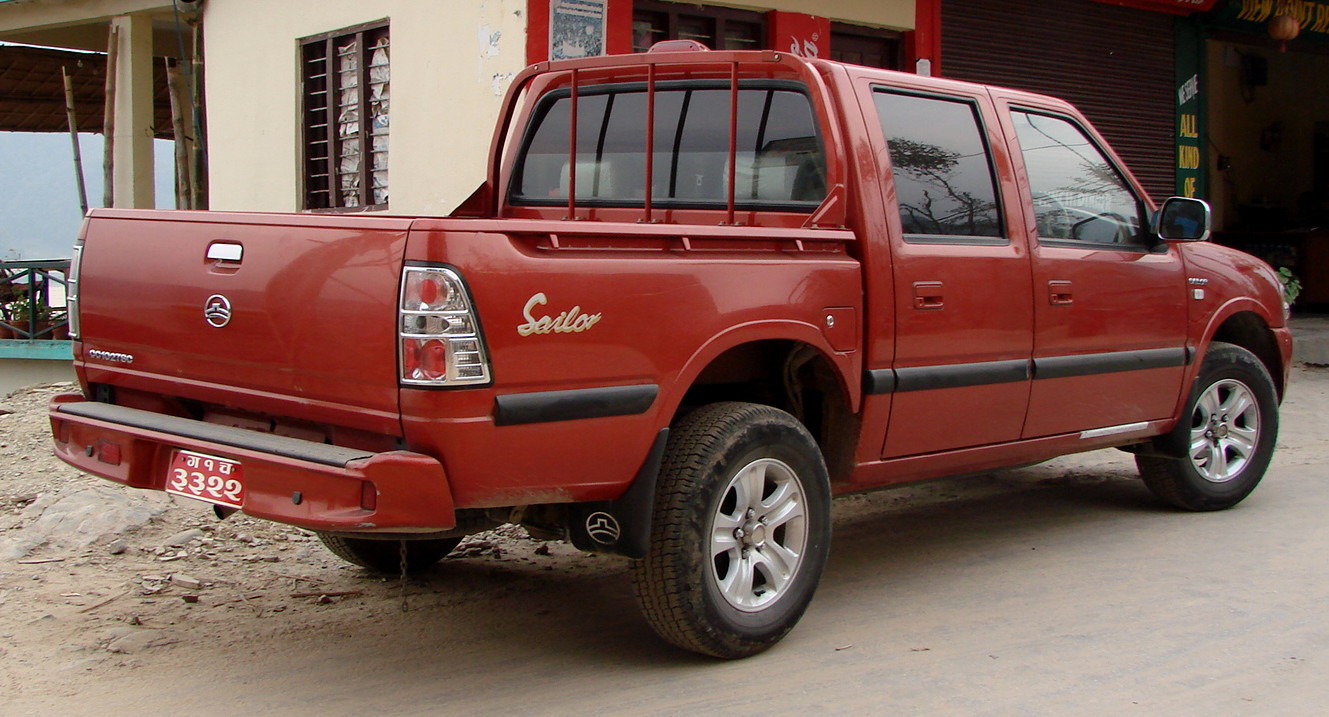
The rear view of the Great Wall Sailor.

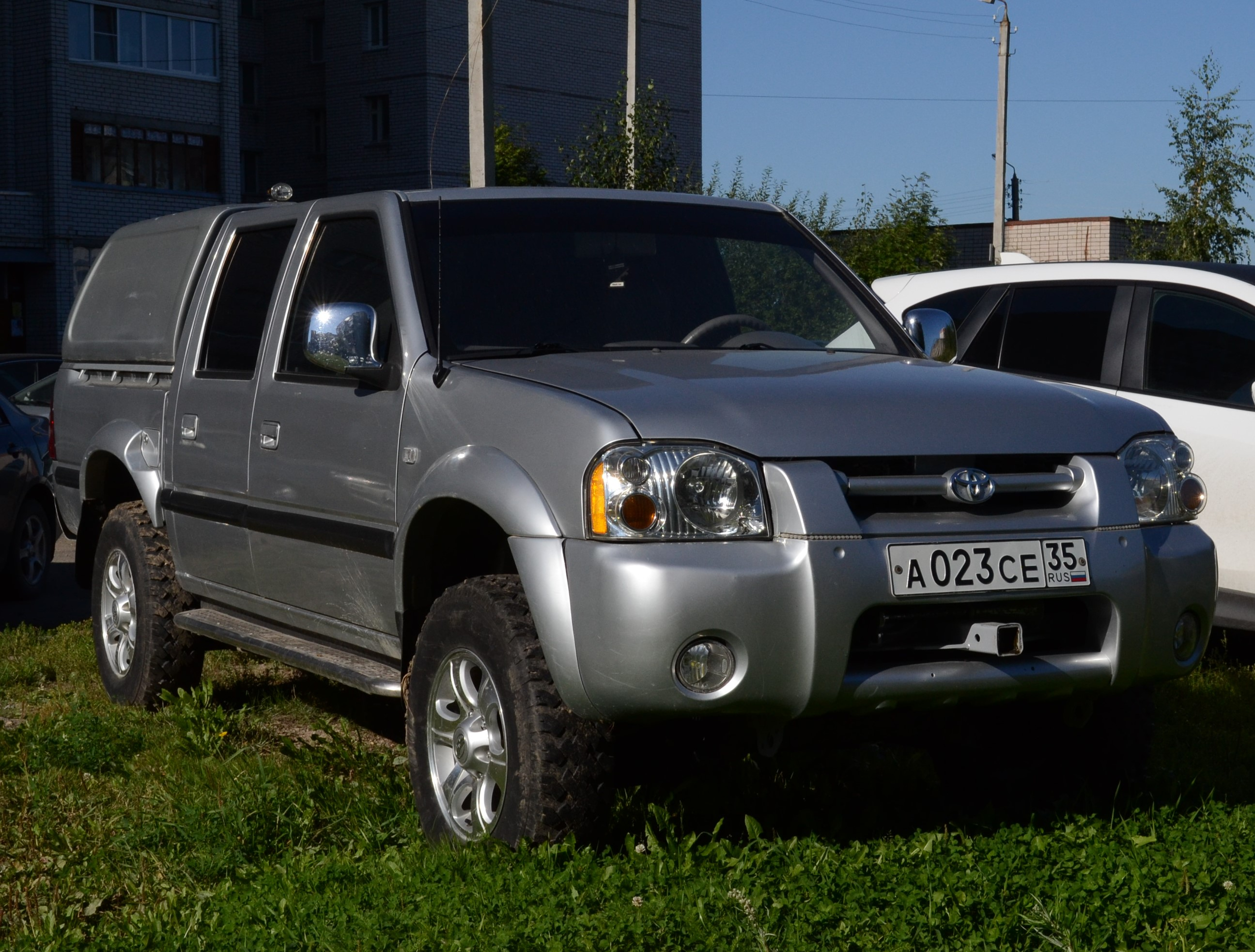
Great Wall Sailor pre-facelift.

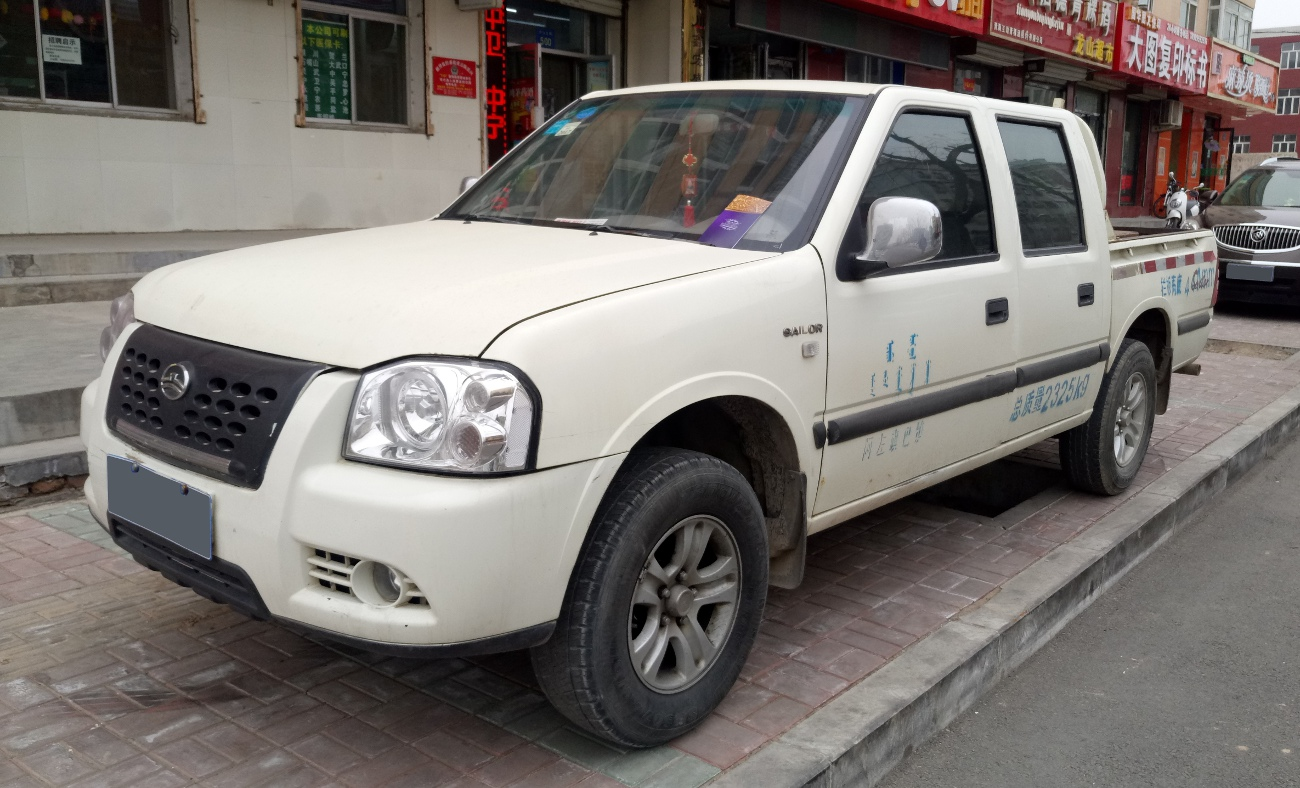
Great Wall Sailor post-facelift.

== Safety ==
The Great Wall SA220 received 2 out of 5 stars in ANCAP testing.

ANCAP test results GWM SA 220 Dual cab (2009)
Test	Score
Overall	2 /5 stars
Frontal offset	2.32/16
Side impact	16/16
Pole	Not Assessed
Seat belt reminders	0/3
Whiplash protection	Not Assessed
Pedestrian protection	Poor
Electronic stability control	Not Available
