= Great Wall Sing =

Chinese full-size SUV

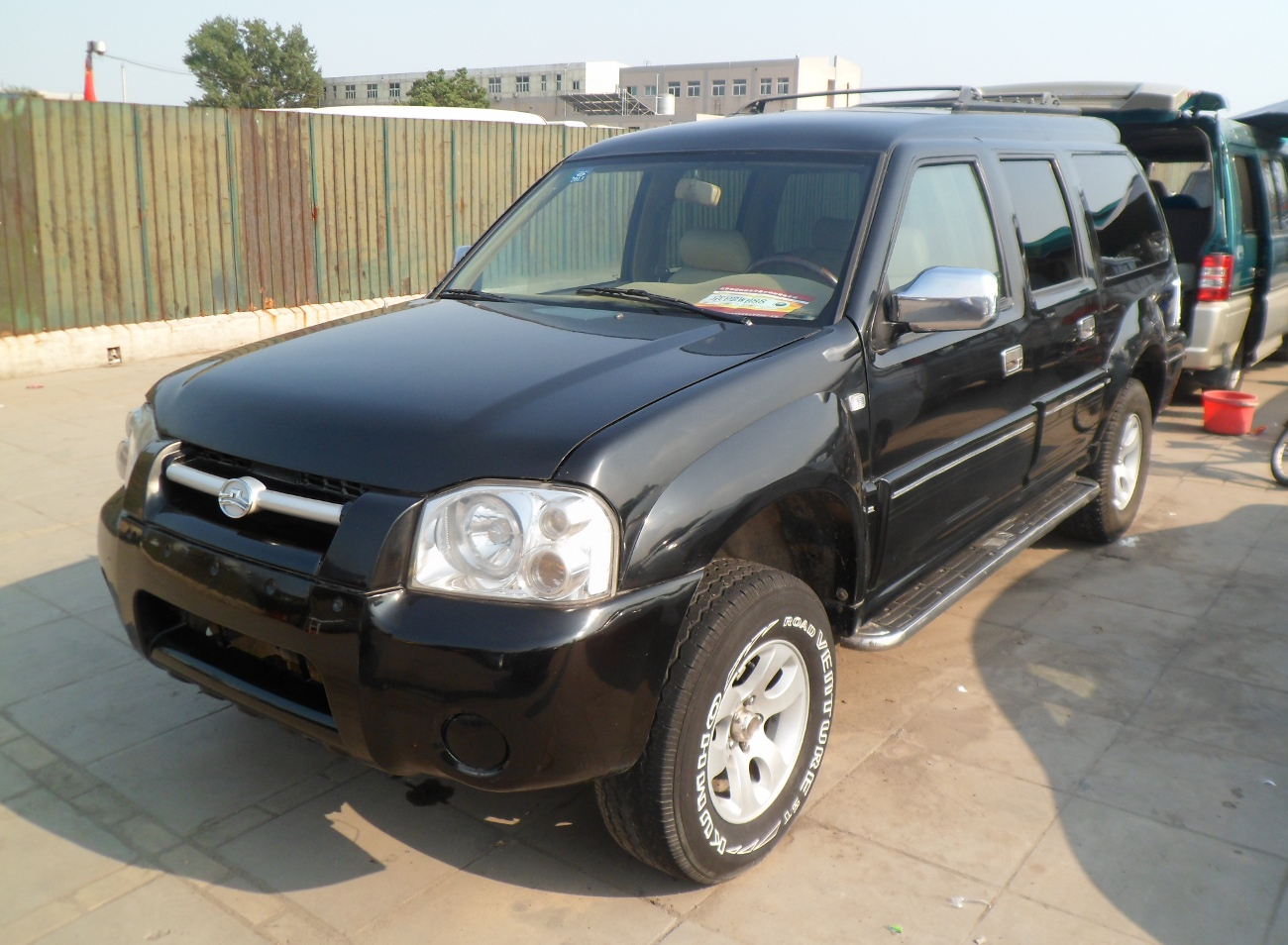

Overview
- Manufacturer: Great Wall Motors
- Also called: Great Wall Sing RUV
- Production: 2005–2008
- Model years: 2006–2008
- Assembly: China: Baoding

Body and chassis
- Class: Full-size SUV
- Body style: 5-door SUV
- Layout: Front-engine, rear-wheel drive
- Related: Great Wall Sailor; Isuzu Faster (TF); Isuzu MU (UCS55/UCS69GW)

Powertrain
- Engine: Petrol: 2.2 L GW491QE I4
- Transmission: 5-speed manual

Dimensions
- Wheelbase: 2,760 mm (108.7 in)
- Length: 4,820 mm (189.8 in) (2005); 4,810 mm (189.4 in) (2006–2008)
- Width: 1,700 mm (66.9 in)
- Height: 1,855 mm (73.0 in)
- Kerb weight: 1,625 kg (3,583 lb) (2005–2007); 1,670 kg (3,682 lb) (2008)

Chronology
- Successor: Haval H9

The Great Wall Sing (Chinese: 长城赛影; pinyin: Chángchéng Sàiyǐng) is a full-size SUV produced by Great Wall Motors.

== Overview ==
As the SUV version of the Great Wall Sailor, the body of the Great Wall Sing was the LWB 5-door Isuzu MU/Chevrolet Grand LUV wagon produced under license with a redesigned front end heavily resembling a Nissan Paladin/Frontier.

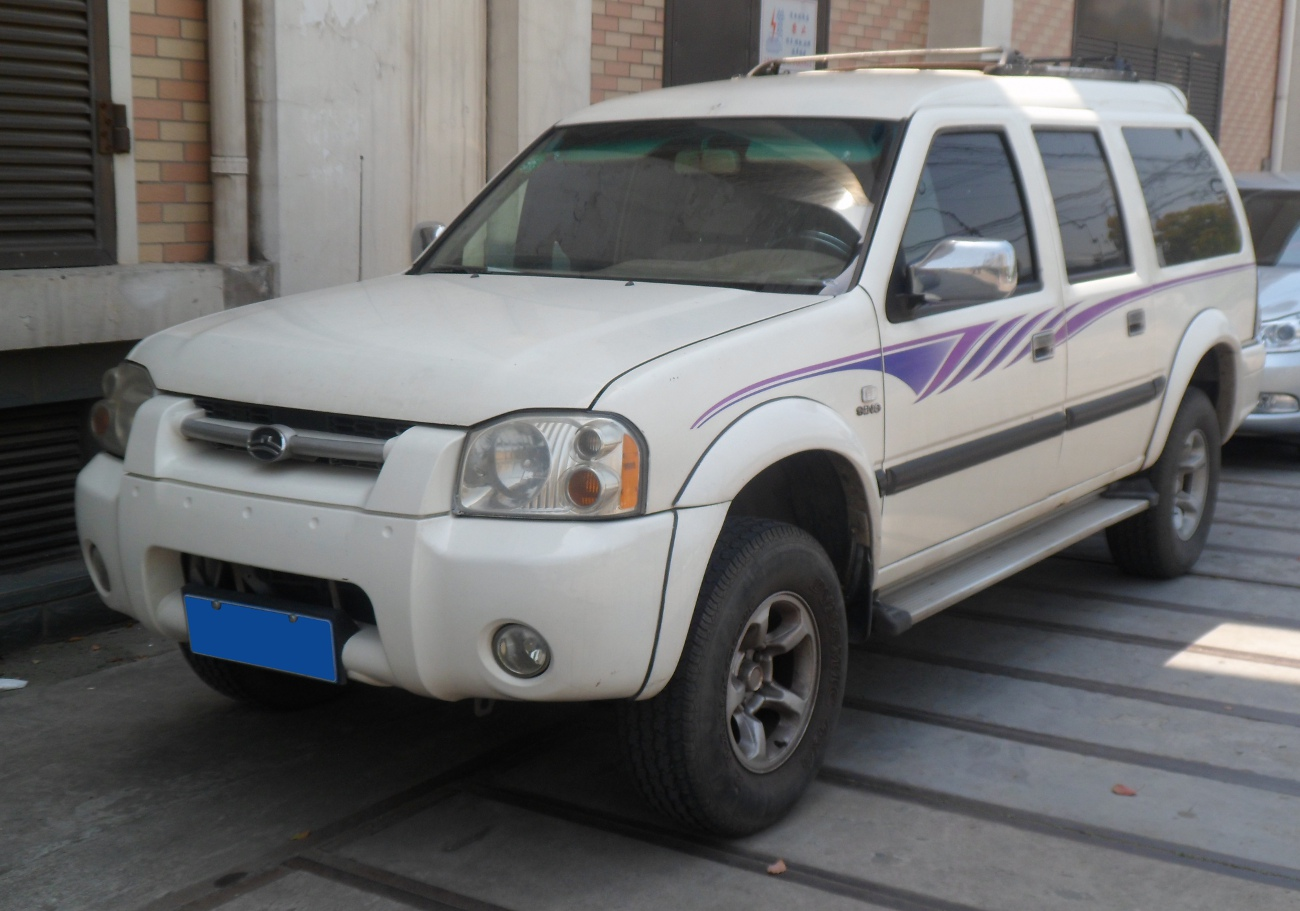
The front view of the pre-facelift Great Wall Sing.

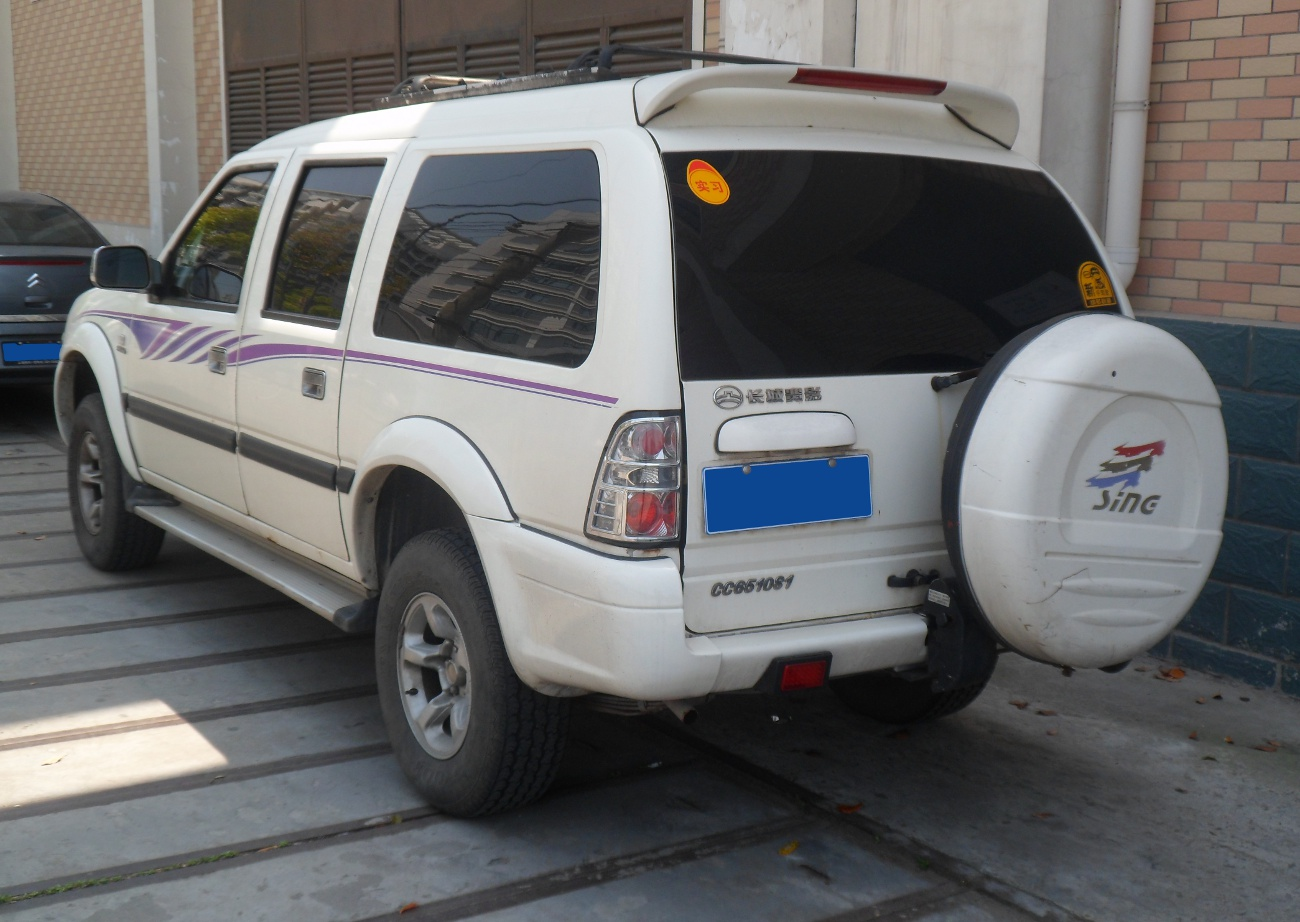
The rear view of the pre-facelift Great Wall Sing.

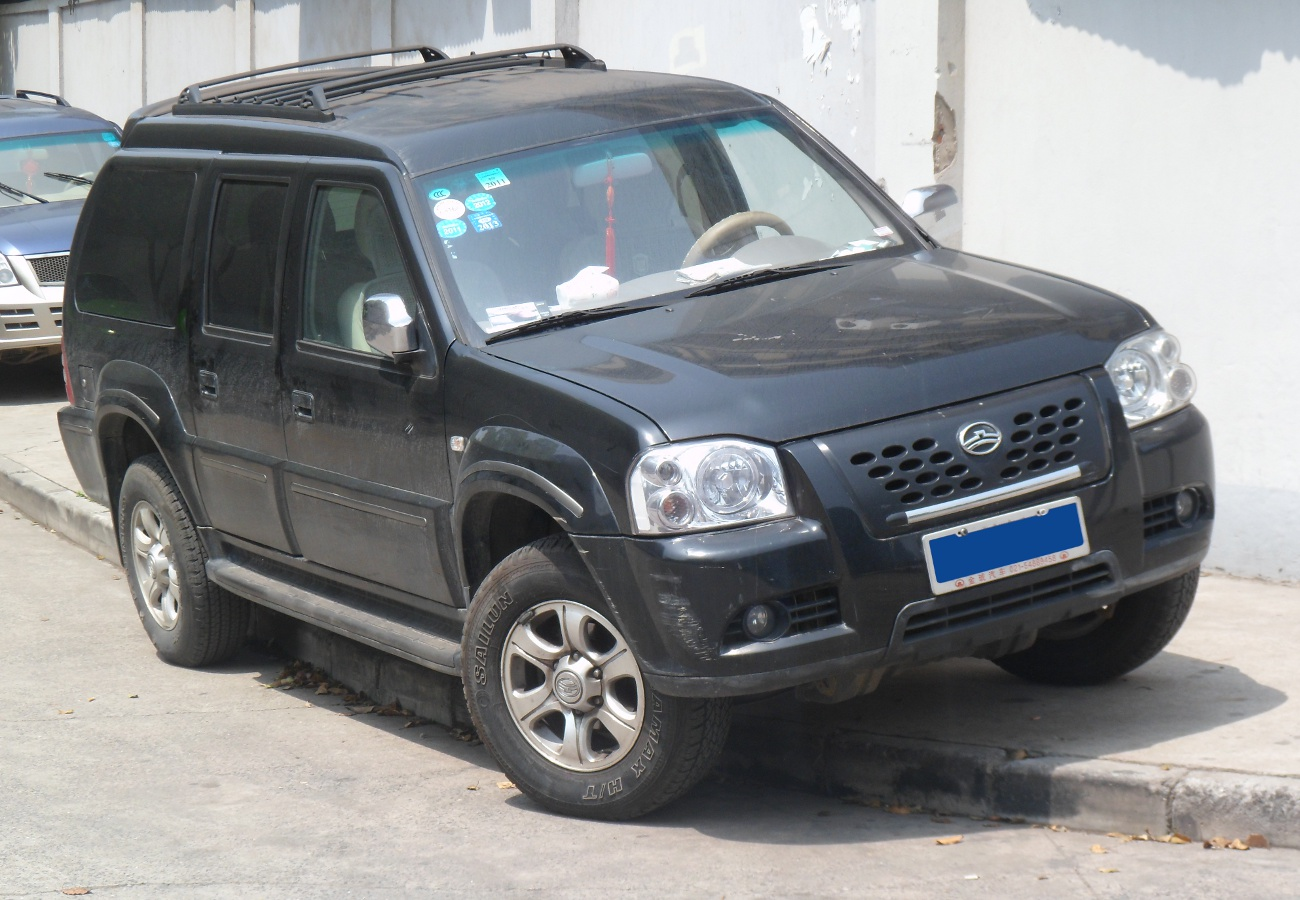
The front view of the post-facelift Great Wall Sing.

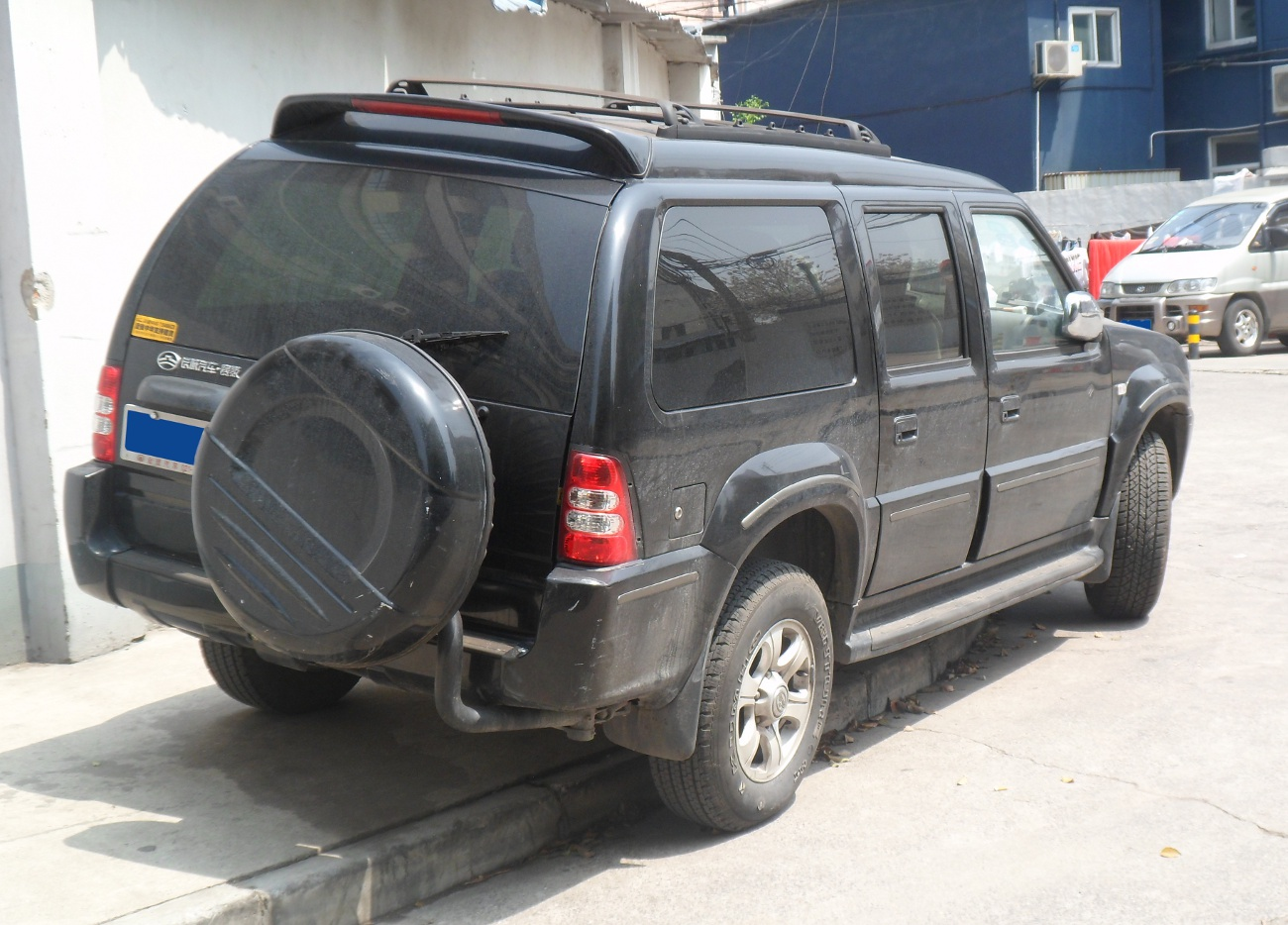
The rear view of the post-facelift Great Wall Sing.
