= Souo S2000 =

Touring motorcycle

GWM Souo S2000
- Manufacturer: Great Wall Souo Moto
- Parent company: Great Wall Motor
- Production: 2024–present
- Class: Touring
- Engine: 1,999 cc (122.0 cu in) liquid-cooled boxer-eight, DOHC, 4 valves per cylinder
- Bore / stroke: 68.0 mm × 68.8 mm (2.68 in × 2.71 in)
- Top speed: 210 km/h (130 mph)
- Power: 151.5 hp (113.0 kW; 153.6 PS) at 6,500rpm
- Torque: 190 N⋅m (140 lb⋅ft) at 4,500rpm
- Transmission: 8-speed dual-wet clutch, plus electric reverse
- Frame type: Die-cast aluminium
- Suspension: F: Dual wishbone, electronic variable damping R: Electronic variable damping
- Brakes: F: Dual 320 mm (13 in) discs, four-piston Brembo calipers R: Single 295 mm (11.6 in) disc, four-piston Brembo calipers
- Tires: F: 130/70R-18; R: 200/55R-16
- Wheelbase: 1,810 mm (71 in)
- Dimensions: L: 2,667 mm (105.0 in); W: 950 mm (37 in); H: 1,540 mm (61 in)
- Seat height: 740 mm (29 in)
- Weight: 450 kg (990 lb) (ST); 461 kg (1,016 lb) (GL) (wet)
- Fuel capacity: 26.2 L (6.9 US gal)
- Fuel consumption: 5.9 L/100 km (40 mpg_{‑US})
- Related: Souo LH2000
- Ground clearance: 130 mm (5.1 in)

The Great Wall Souo S2000 (Chinese: 长城灵魂S2000; pinyin: chángchéng línghún S2000; lit. 'Great Wall Soul S2000') is a touring motorcycle produced by Great Wall Souo Moto, a sub brand of Great Wall Motor, since 2024. It is the first motorcycle made by the company, and has a boxer-eight engine, which is the world's first flat-eight engine in a motorcycle application.

The model was revealed at the Beijing International Motorcycle Exhibition on 17 May 2024, and pre-orders opened in October 2024 before initial limited deliveries began in 2025, after which it launched at Auto Shanghai 2025 on 23 April 2025.

== Overview ==
The S2000's development was led by Great Wall chairman Wei Jianjun, who considers it as his passion project as he simply loves motorcycles.

The S2000 comes in three versions: the base ST which starts at 218,800 yuan (30,700 USD); the upgraded GL, with a rear seat and three luggage cases; and the Founder Edition, which features matte black exterior elements with gold accents and is limited to 88 units. The first batch of S2000s was limited to 200 units excluding the Founders Edition. The third batch of 200 units went on sale on 28 March 2025.

The S2000 features twin headlights above two large air intakes, polished chrome trim and exhaust pipes, and large luggage cases at the rear which total 118 litres (4.2 cu ft). It has a flat engine and the transmission is mounted low to save space and lower center-of-gravity. According to GWM, it has a welded die-cast aluminium frame assembled without any screws. The S2000 is available in three paint colors: Lion Red, Meteorite Black, and Swan White.

The S2000 is equipped with a 12.3-inch digital instrument cluster powered by a Qualcomm Snapdragon 8155 SoC and supports OTA updates, and is controlled by a dial and buttons behind the handlebars or by voice command. It has heated seats and handlebar grips, power adjustable windshield angle, a 360-watt eight-speaker sound system, hill start assist, cruise control, rear parking sensors, and electronic parking brake. It is equipped with safety features including ABS, traction control, lane change assist, blind-spot monitoring, rear-collision warning, rear cross traffic alert, and emergency calls.

The 2.0-litre boxer-eight engine outputs 113 kW (152 hp; 154 PS) and 190 N⋅m (140 lb⋅ft) of torque using 95 RON petrol, paired to an eight-speed wet dual-clutch transmission and drives the wheel with a driveshaft. Each piston has an individual crank pin on the crankshaft, allowing for opposite pistons to move in opposite directions for a boxer configuration. It achieves a fuel consumption of roughly 5.9 L/100 km (40 mpg_{‑US}). It has a top speed of 210 km/h (130 mph).

It uses a Hossack-style double-wishbone front suspension, while both the front and rear wheels have electronically controlled variable dampers.
