= Great Wall Motor =

Chinese automobile manufacturer

Great Wall Motor Company Limited
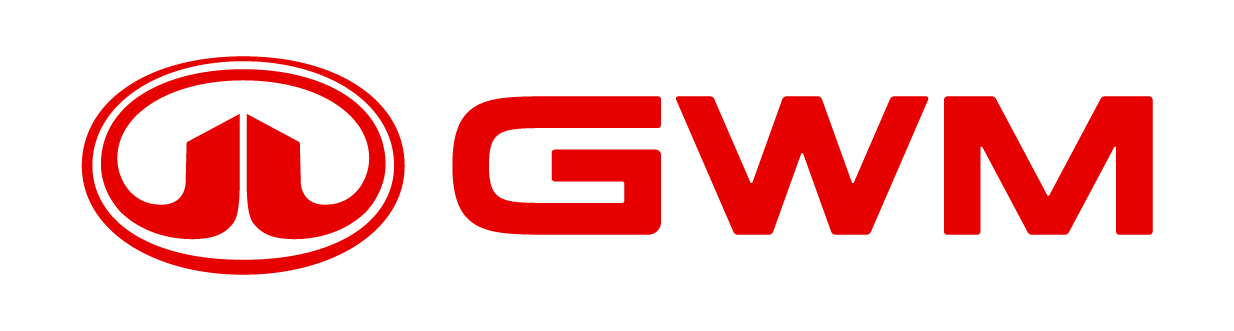
- Logo used since 2025

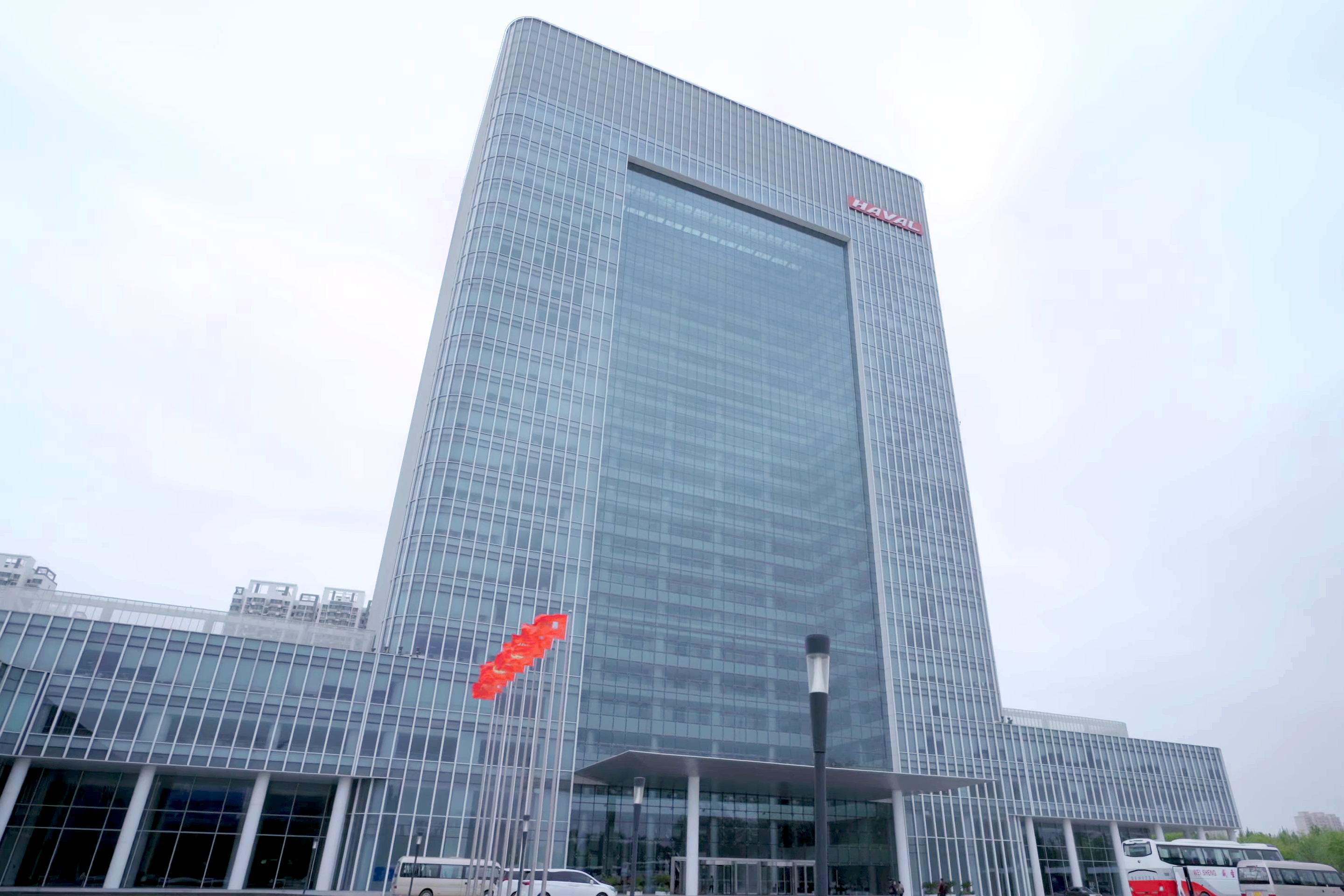
- GWM R&D Center in Baoding
- Type: Public
- Traded as: SEHK: 2333
- Industry: Automotive
- Founded: 1984; 42 years ago
- Headquarters: Baoding, Hebei, China
- Area served: Worldwide
- Key people: Wei Jianjun (chairman, executive director); Zhao Guoqing (vice chairman, executive director); Mu Feng (chief executive director)
- Products: Automobiles, engines, transmissions
- Production output: ▲1,323,672 vehicles (2025)
- Brands: GWM; Haval; Ora; Wey; Tank; Souo
- Revenue: ▲CN¥ 173.21 billion (2023)
- Operating income: ▼CN¥ 7.20 billion (2023)
- Net income: ▼CN¥ 7.02 billion (2023)
- Total assets: ▲CN¥ 201.27 billion (2023)
- Total equity: ▲CN¥ 68.50 billion (2023)
- Number of employees: ▼82,439 (2023)
- Parent: Baoding Great Wall Holdings Company
- Subsidiaries: Spotlight Automotive (50%)

Chinese name
- Simplified Chinese: 长城汽车股份有限公司
- Traditional Chinese: 長城汽車股份有限公司
Transcriptions
Standard Mandarin
- Hanyu Pinyin: Chángchéng Qìchē Gǔfèn Yǒuxiàn Gōngsī
- Website: gwm.com.cn (Chinese) gwm-global.com (global)

Great Wall Motor Company Limited (Chinese: 长城汽车; pinyin: Chángchéng Qìchē), trading as GWM, is a Chinese automobile manufacturer headquartered in Baoding, Hebei, China. Named after the Great Wall of China, the company largely produces sport-utility vehicles (SUVs) and pick-up trucks, as well as trucks. It is one of the top ten Chinese automobile manufacturers, with 1.23 million vehicles sold globally in 2024. In 2020, GWM ranked 128th on China's 500 Most Valuable Brands by World Brand Lab with a brand value of 50.752 billion yuan.

GWM was founded in 1984 as a small manufacturer partly owned by a local government in Hebei. Wei Jianjun, GWM's current chairman was appointed as the company director in 1990, and grew the company as one of the leading pickup truck manufacturers in China. In 1998, the company was privatized and went public on the Hong Kong Stock Exchange in 2003.

The company manufactures and sells vehicles under multiple brands, including GWM, Haval, Wey, Tank, Poer, and Ora. In addition to automobiles, it produces touring motorcycles under the Souo brand. Since 2019, GWM has also operated a joint venture with BMW Group to produce electric Mini vehicles in China, under the name Spotlight Automotive.

== History ==
=== 1984–2003: Establishment and early years ===
GWM began as an agricultural vehicle repair workshop called Great Wall Repair Factory in Baoding, Hebei. The workshop was founded in 1976 by Wei Deliang, the uncle of the current chairman Wei Jianjun, in collaboration with the local government of Nandayuan Township. By 1984, the workshop began producing his own commercial vehicles based on the Beijing BJ212, including small trucks called the CC130 and a large SUV, the CC513. Wei Deliang renamed the company Great Wall Industry Company.

After graduating high school, Wei Jianjun worked briefly in a micromotor factory in Beijing, and later at a carpet factory. In 1986, he joined a company owned by Wei Deyi, his father, which focused on metal construction, water pipes, and heating parts. In 1989, he and his father founded Taihang Dongwei Automotive Suspension, focusing on designing vehicle suspensions. In 1989, Wei Deliang died in a car accident. As the Great Wall Industry Company was a cooperative, the company reverted to local community ownership. At the time, the business was struggling with few technically trained workers and some debts. The Nandayuan Township council sought a new director to run the company on their behalf. At the age of 26, Wei Jianjun applied for the position, viewing it as an opportunity to pursue his interest in cars. In July 1990, he was appointed director for five years and left his father's company.

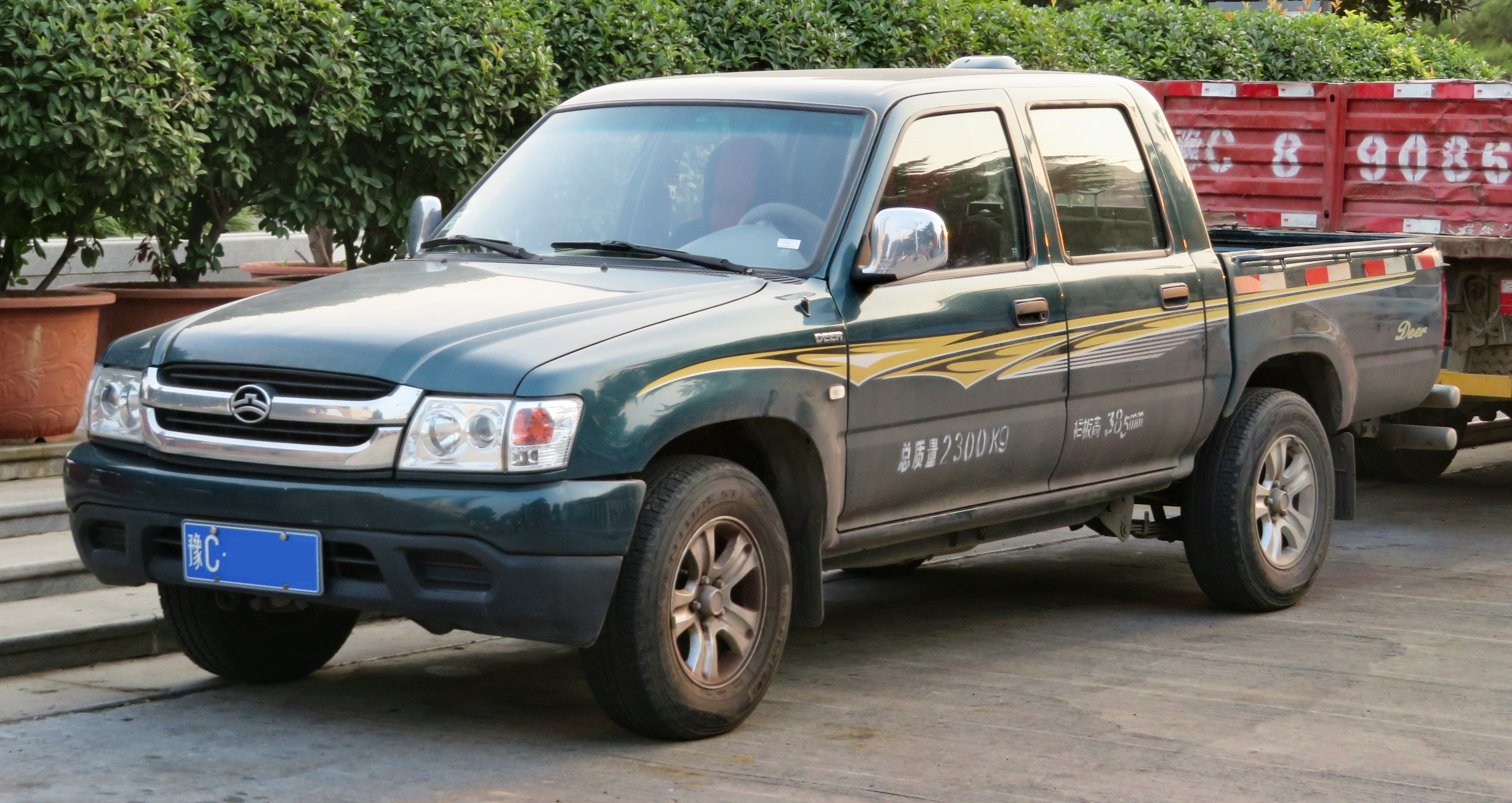
The Great Wall Deer closely copied the sixth-generation Toyota Hilux.

Upon taking charge, Wei Jianjun started developing passenger cars, and taught himself automotive engineering with his team. By 1993, Great Wall produced several models based on existing designs, such as the Nissan Cedric (Y30) and Toyota Crown (S130), labeled CC1020 and CC1020S respectively. The company also developed variants like station wagons and pickups. Other early Great Wall models includes a BJ212-based crew cab pickup (also called CC1020S), a BJ212-based station wagon, the CC6490, a clone of the Rolls-Royce Silver Spur, and a small sedan known as the Hawk CC6470, itself based on the Toyota Corolla (E80). However, new national regulations forced Great Wall to end passenger car (sedans) production by the end of 1994. Recognizing the potential of pickup trucks globally, Wei Jianjun developed a model based on the Toyota Hilux. In 1996, Great Wall launched the Great Wall Deer, priced competitively and was considered of good quality. The Deer's success made Great Wall the leading pickup producer in China. In October 1997, the first Great Wall pickup trucks were exported to the Middle East.

In 1998, the local government privatized the company, forming Great Wall Motor Group Co. Ltd., with Wei Jianjun owning 25% of the shares. By 2001, the Wei family owned 56%, while the Nandayuan Township retained the rest. Great Wall expanded its pickup range with models like the Sailor and SoCool, and ventured into SUVs with the Safe, Sing, and Pegasus models.

In 1999, Great Wall faced a supply chain crisis when its sole engine supplier partnered with competitor Brilliance Auto, limiting supply to Great Wall. To secure their supply chain, Wei Jianjun established the Great Wall Internal Combustion Engine Company, holding a 51% stake, and invested in advanced equipment for independent engine production. Over the next two years, he formed over ten holding companies through mergers and acquisitions to produce various automobile parts.

=== 2003–2018: Initial public offering, exports and new brands ===
Older logo of GWM

GWM was the first private Chinese auto manufacturer to become a public company, by making an initial public offering on the Hong Kong Stock Exchange on 15 December 2003. In 2006, GWM introduced the Haval CUV (initially Hover CUV) in 2006, which was exported to Asian, Russian, and South American markets. The Haval platform also supported the Wingle pickup, which became popular in export markets. GWM started selling vehicles in Europe in 2006, offering small vans. In September 2006, 500 units of Haval CUVs were exported to Italy for the first time, marking the first time a privately owned Chinese car company exported cars to Europe in large quantities. GWM products were first available in the Australian market in 2009. In 2011, GWM opened a factory in Bulgaria that assembles three different models from knock-down kits.

During this period, GWM's passenger cars often resembled models from other carmakers. GWM launched several models between 2006 and 2010, including the Peri (a Fiat Panda lookalike) and the Voleex series (resembling Toyota and Honda models). Numerous legal disputes over intellectual property followed, with varied outcomes. In China, Fiat's case against the Peri was rejected due to insufficient visual differences, while in Italy, the sale of the Peri was prohibited. GWM defended their practices as necessary for catching up with international competitors.

On 28 September 2011, GWM went public again, this time on the Shanghai Stock Exchange, merging the equity portfolios of the Wei family and Nandayuan Township into a single investment fund. This IPO established the company's current corporate structure.

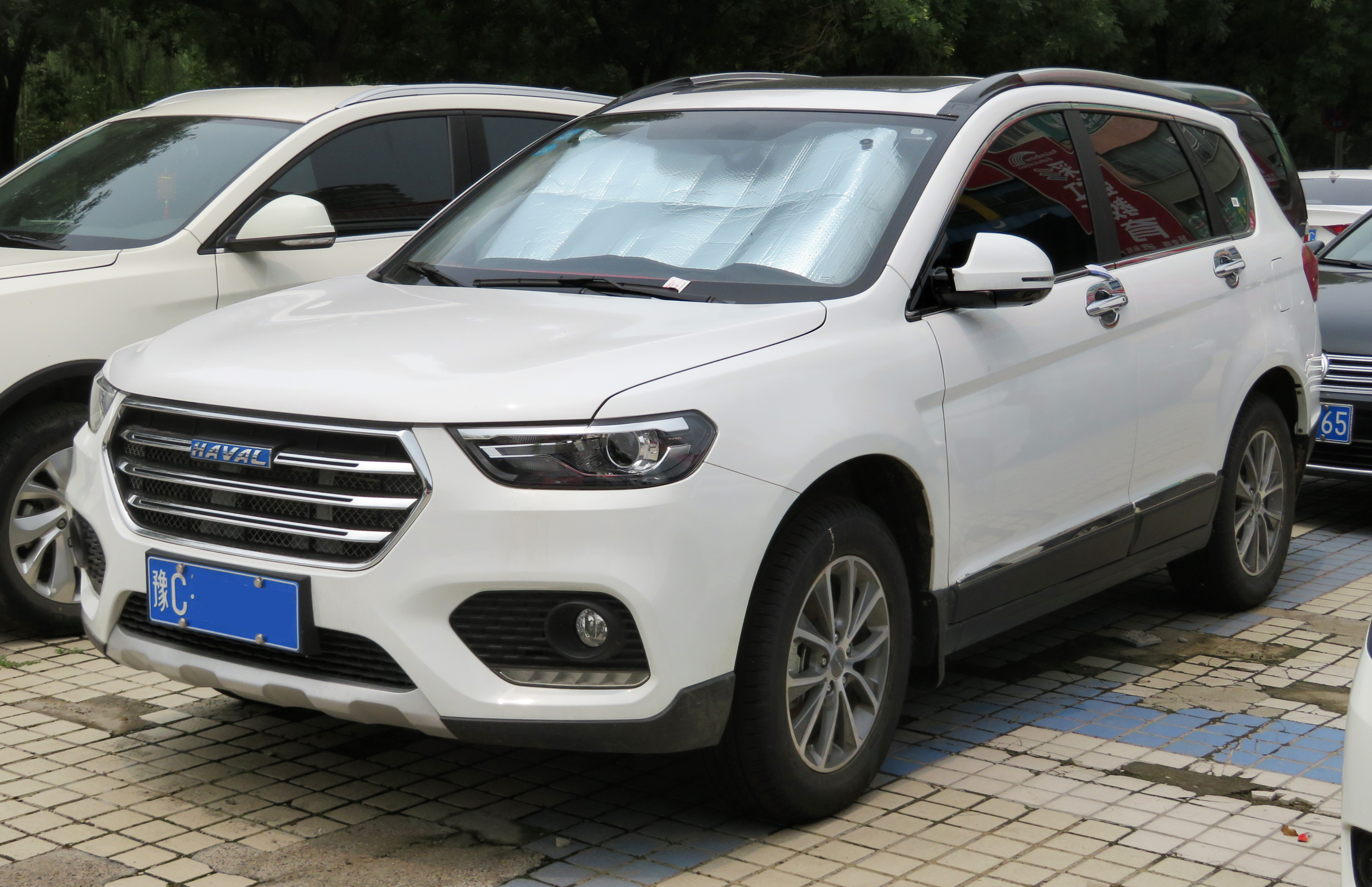
As of 2024, GWM has sold more than 4 million Haval H6 over three generations.

In the midst of producing numerous copycat vehicles, GWM introduced the Haval H6 at the 2010 Guangzhou Auto Show, which was notable for not being a direct copy of other carmaker's model. The crossover SUV quickly became GWM's major success, catering to the growing Chinese middle-class family market with its spacious interior and above-average build quality. It found success nationwide, particularly in urban and coastal regions. Since its launch, the H6 has led the SUV segment in China for 103 consecutive months, or around 8 years. As of 2024, GWM has sold more than 4 million H6 globally.

With the success of the Haval H6, GWM achieved massive growth, with net profit increasing sevenfold in five years. It became one of the first carmaker to fully concentrate on the SUV segment as its popularity began to grow. This shift also marked the launch of Haval as a brand in March 2013, which only sells SUVs. The company quickly phased out sedans and hatchbacks, except for the Voleex C30 which lasted until 2016. This strategy proved highly successful, with GWM producing over one million cars annually for the first time by 2016. The company later introduced several new Haval models, positioned both above and below the H6. By 2018, there were at least ten Haval H6 derivatives.

In April 2017, GWM introduced a third brand, Wey, named after Wei Jianjun's family name. Positioned as the group's premium brand, Wey delivered more luxurious crossovers and SUVs than Haval.

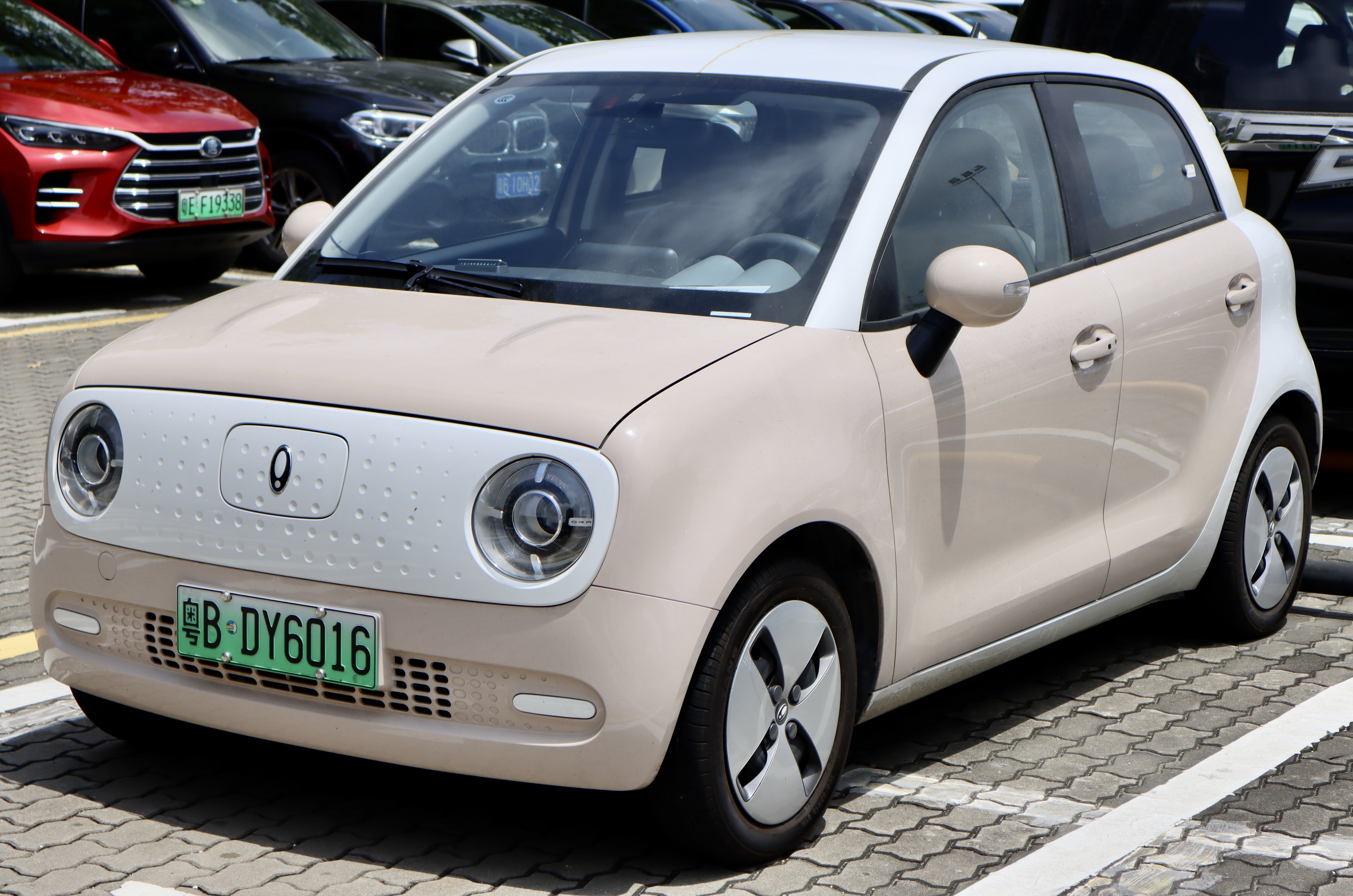
2019 Ora Black Cat electric car

In the electric vehicle segment, GWM through its battery business unit conducted pre-research on battery production since 2012. in October 2016, the company launched its first electric vehicle, the Great Wall C30EV. In 2017, to offset the company's fleet average fuel consumption in China, GWM acquired a 25% stake of Hebei Yujie Vehicle Industry, a major company in the low-speed electric vehicle (LSEV) market. The collaboration led to the establishment of Linktour Automobile, which initially converted some LSEVs to automobiles. The Link Tour K-One electric crossover launched shortly after but failed in the market. By 2019, Linktour faced financial difficulties, leading to production halts and eventual bankruptcy. In February 2018, GWM spun off its battery business unit into an independent battery manufacturer, SVOLT Energy Technology Co., Ltd or commonly known as SVOLT. GWM in 2018 also created its own electric vehicle brand, Ora. While its first model, the Ora iQ, had limited success, the Ora Black Cat (initially Ora R1) dominated small electric car sales.

=== 2018–present: Global expansion ===
In 2018, GWM signed a joint venture agreement with BMW, establishing Spotlight Automotive to produce electric Mini in China for the global market.

In this period, GWM has been investing in overseas markets to increase its manufacturing footprint and sales outside China. In June 2019, GWM's Russian factory in the Uzlovaya industrial park in Tula went operational after being under construction since 2015. It was the largest investment project from a Chinese manufacturing industry in Russia.

In January 2020, GWM agreed to purchase one of two plants owned by General Motors India located in Talegaon, Maharashtra as part of the company's aim to manufacture and sell cars in India. The company participated at the Auto Expo in February 2020, which was held in Greater Noida. The company had proposed an investment of US$1 billion and planned to start manufacturing in 2021. In July 2022, GWM cancelled its Indian investment plans due to failure of obtaining regulatory approvals, caused by the Indian government stance towards Chinese investments amid the ongoing Sino-Indian border dispute.

In February 2020, GWM reached a deal with General Motors to purchase the General Motors Thailand plant in Rayong province. It began production in the first quarter of 2021 with an annual production capacity of 80,000 units.

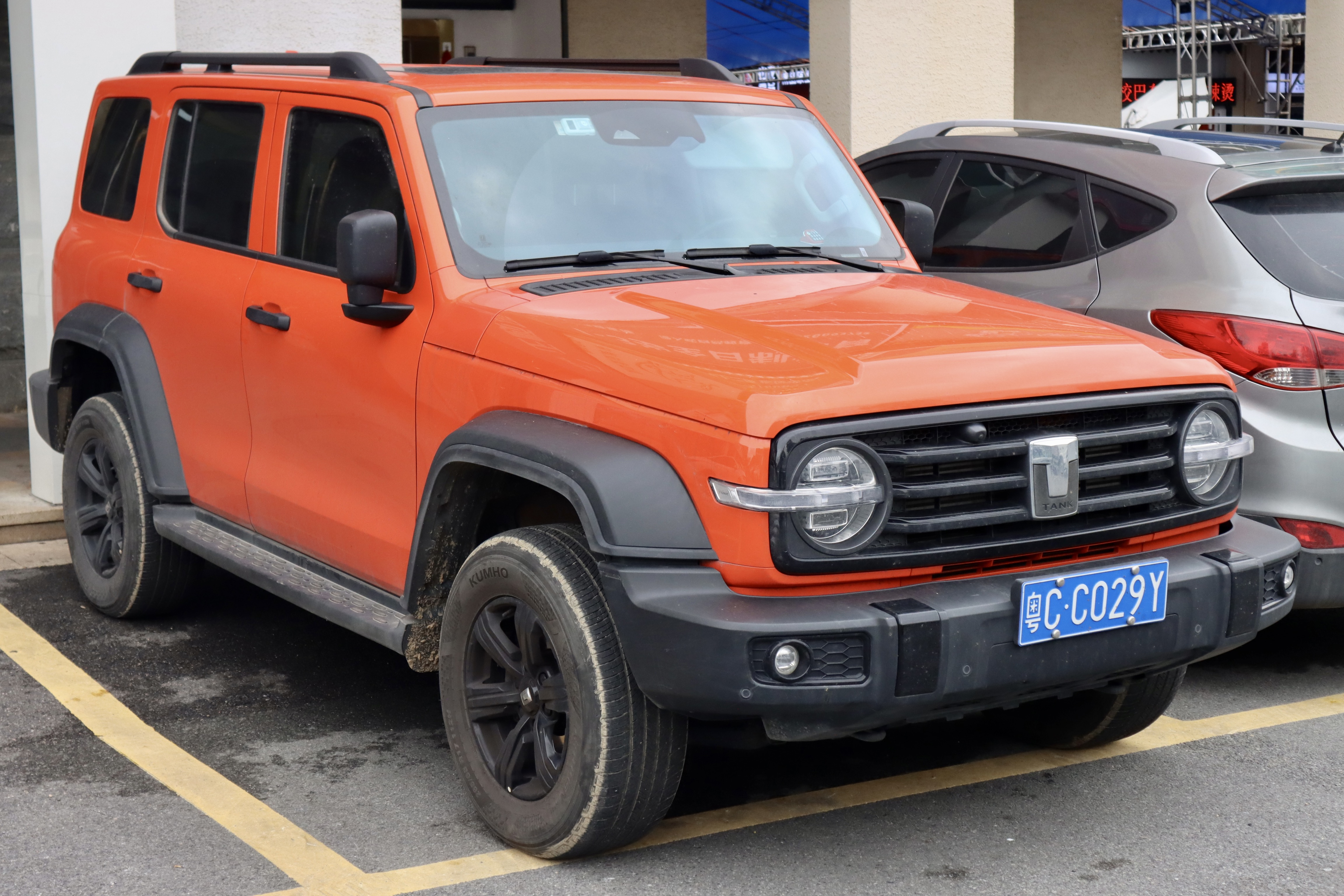
The Tank 300 is the first product from GWM's Tank brand.

In 2020, Great Wall Motor rebranded to GWM. In March 2021, GWM spun off the Tank brand, which was previously a model line within the Wey brand. Tank-branded vehicles are body-on-frame SUVs based on the Tank platform.

After participating in European auto shows such as the International Motor Show Germany in 2019 and 2021, GWM opened its European headquarters in Munich, Germany in November 2021 as an effort to expand sales in Europe with Wey and Ora brands. In May 2024, GWM announced that it is closing its European headquarters by 31 August 2024 due to its low sales in the region. In 2023, the company sold just 6,300 vehicles in Europe, or 2% of its overseas sales. GWM vehicles will still be available in Europe, however its European operations will be controlled directly from China.

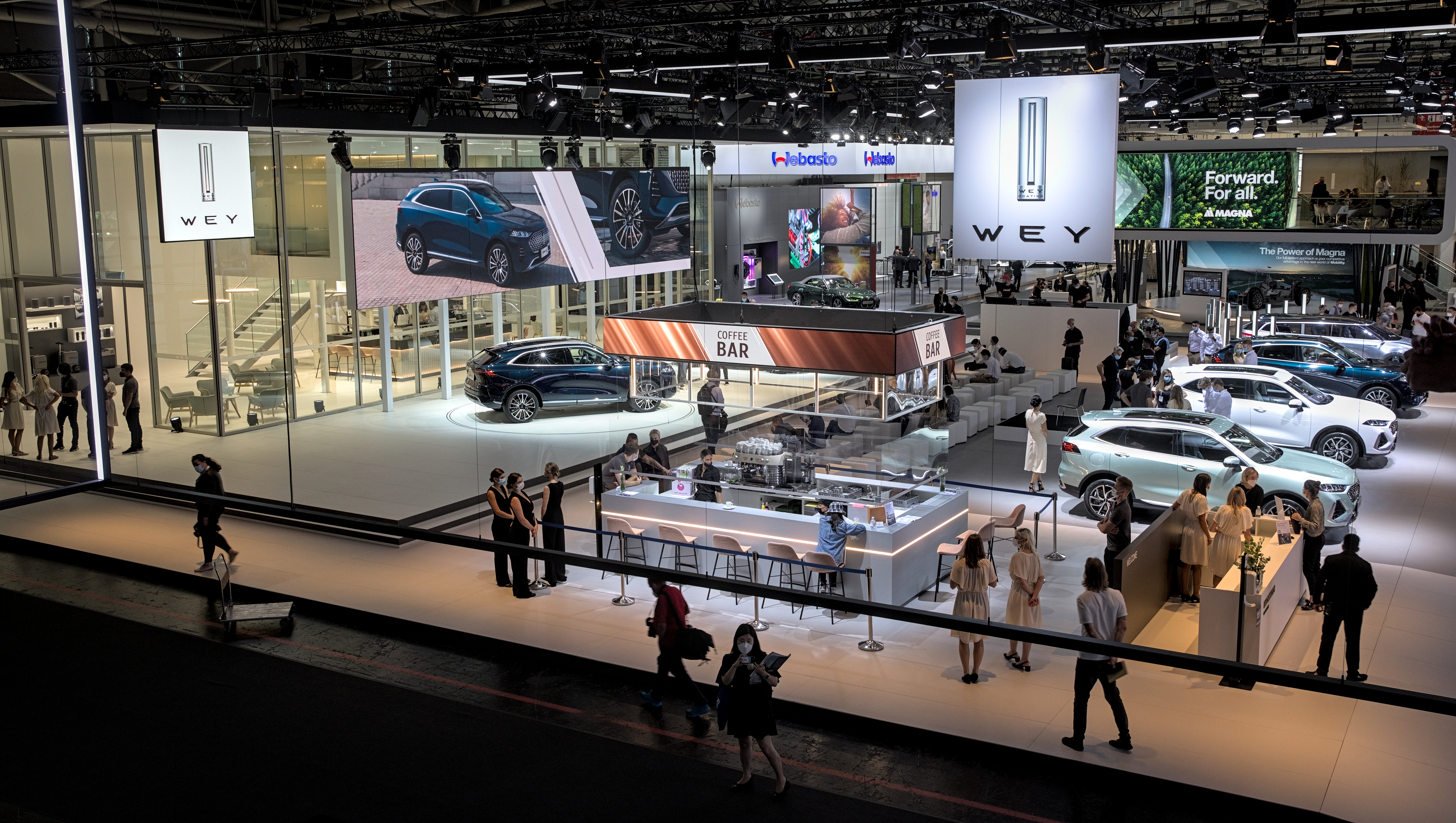
Wey booth at the 2021 International Motor Show Germany in Frankfurt

In November 2023, GWM announced an adjustment of its multi-brand strategy for export markets, naming the new strategy "One GWM". GWM will be a "master brand", while its brands such as Haval, Ora and Wey were downgraded to a sub-brand status. This adjustment led to the renaming of the Ora Funky Cat to the GWM Ora 03, and the Ora Next Cat to the GWM Ora 07 for some markets. In mid-2024, GWM started replacing the Haval wordmark at the rear of its vehicles in favour of a "GWM" wordmark badge, starting with the 2024 Haval Jolion in Australia.

Logo between 2020 and 2025

In January 2026, Great Wall Motor officially launched the Guiyuan (归元) Platform at its Baoding, Hebei. The platform proposes a "one vehicle, multiple powertrains" approach, which is compatible with five powertrain types: Plug-in Hybrid, Hybrid, Battery Electric, Fuel Cell, and ICE. It integrates the Coffee EEA 4.0 electronic and electrical architecture, AI OS in-vehicle system, dual VLA large model, and bionic motion control system.

== Operations ==
=== Manufacturing ===
GWM's primary base of operations is located in Baoding, Hebei province. A site in Tianjin began operating in 2011. A second base of operations in Baoding become operational in October 2013, located in Xushui county.

In November 2020, GWM announced the completion of its Taizhou plant in Jiangsu, with the Ora Good Cat rolling off the assembly line as its first product. The Taizhou base, constructed since November 2019, is GWM's eighth vehicle assembly facility in China, with a total investment of 8 billion yuan ($1.22 billion) and an annual capacity of 100,000 vehicles.

As of 2024, GWM operates 10 full-process automobile manufacturing plants in China, three full-process automobile manufacturing plants overseas in Thailand, Brazil and Russia, and several knock-down assembly plants in countries such as Pakistan and Ecuador.

=== Research and development ===
While R&D activities commenced in 1998, in 2010 the company began construction of a technical center in Baoding, Hebei province. Part of an effort to increase R&D investment, the center may become fully operational in 2013 as GWM said it would obtain "world-leading R&D... and technical ability" by that year.

Currently, component design may rely heavily on foreign technical assistance, and some hard-to-source parts may be provisioned from overseas; the company states it has cooperative agreements with companies such as Autoliv, Delphi Automotive, BorgWarner, Robert Bosch GmbH, the German company Brose, Ricardo plc, TRW Automotive, and Valeo in regards to specific parts such as engines, transmissions, door locks, and airbags, etc. As of 2009, some models used Mitsubishi engines and Siemens electronic systems—both sourced in China.

In January 2016, GWM has announced the creation of a R&D center in Yokohama, Japan as part of a strategy to enter the Japanese auto market. It also opened a R&D center in Bangalore, India in June 2016.

In 2021, following its joint venture with BMW Group, GWM opened an office in Munich, Germany, situated across from the BMW Group Research and Innovation Center (FIZ). The objective of CEO Qiao Xianghua was to hire up to 300 employees in the Design and Engineering sector for its office in Germany. These employees would be tasked with providing services to BMW R&D, sales, and management, including complete vehicle integration, vehicle component development, development and integration of electronic power system platforms, smart driving, and internet of vehicles. Additionally, EDAG constructed another Engineering Building at Frankfurter Ring 77.

=== Leadership ===
Chairman Wei Jianjun (since 1984)

=== Chief Executive Officers ===
- Wang Fengying (2003–2022)
- Mu Feng (2022–present)

== Overseas markets ==
GWM products are available in many places across the globe. Since its early years of exporting vehicles, GWM also uses third-party factories in overseas markets to produce models from knock-down kits.

=== Australia ===
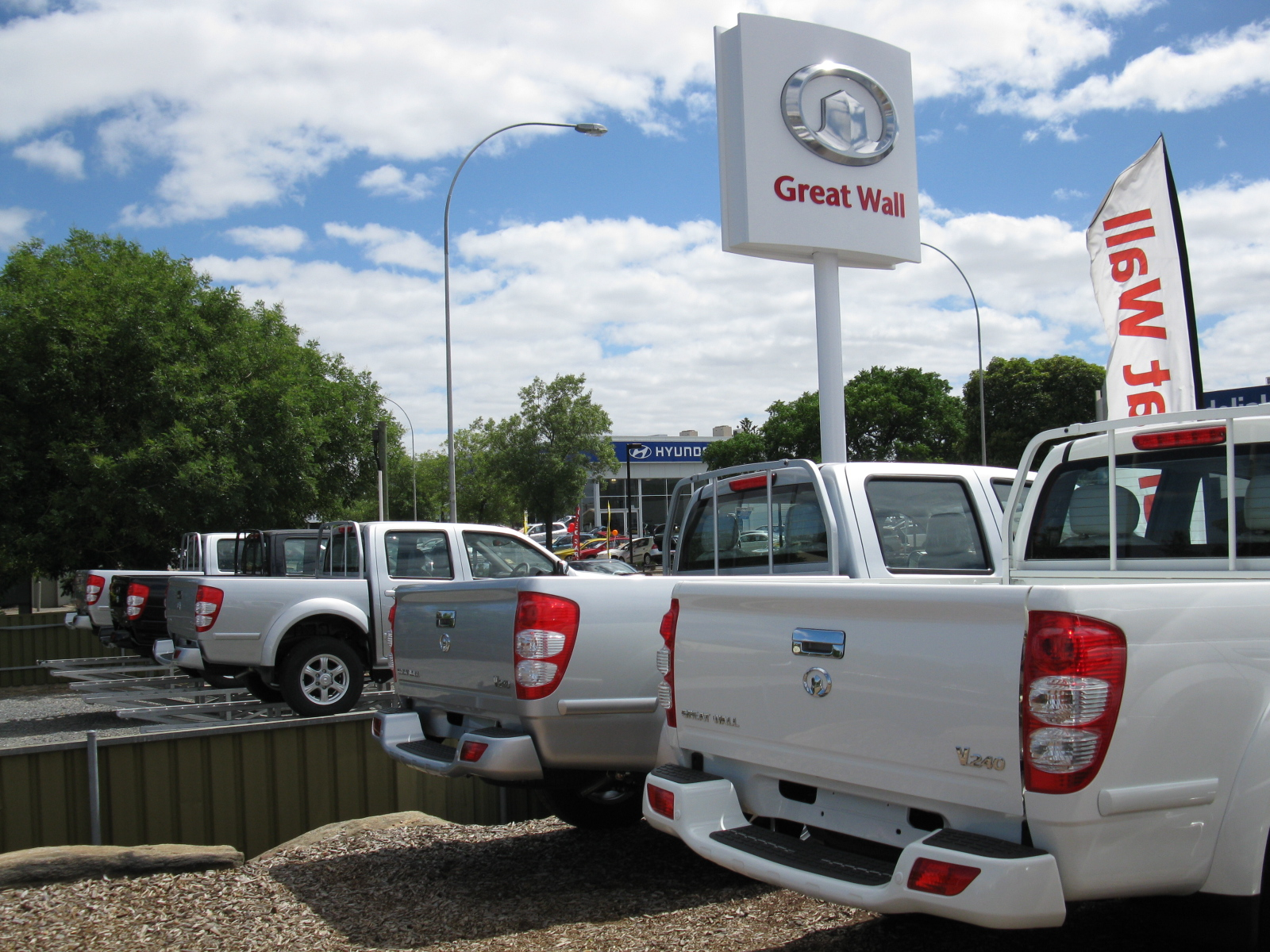
A Great Wall dealership in Adelaide, Australia, in 2010

Great Wall vehicles started sales in Australia in 2009 by an independent distributor, Ateco. In 2012, almost 25,000 Chery and Great Wall vehicles were recalled by Ateco after discoveries of asbestos in the engine and exhaust gaskets. The Australian Competition & Consumer Commission who monitored the recall, stated that the newly imported stock of both brands were not affected by the recall.

In May 2016, GWM set up a factory-backed distribution operation, coinciding with the launch of the Haval brand on the Australian market. As of October 2021, Australia was GWM's largest export market. According to official VFACTS reporting from Australia's Federal Chamber of Automotive Industries (FCAI), GWM Haval sold a total of 18,384 units in the 2021 calendar year, placing GWM Haval 14th overall on the Australian market, ahead of Honda. As of 2023, GWM Australia features a range of models including SUVs, pickup trucks, and electric vehicles.

=== Brazil ===
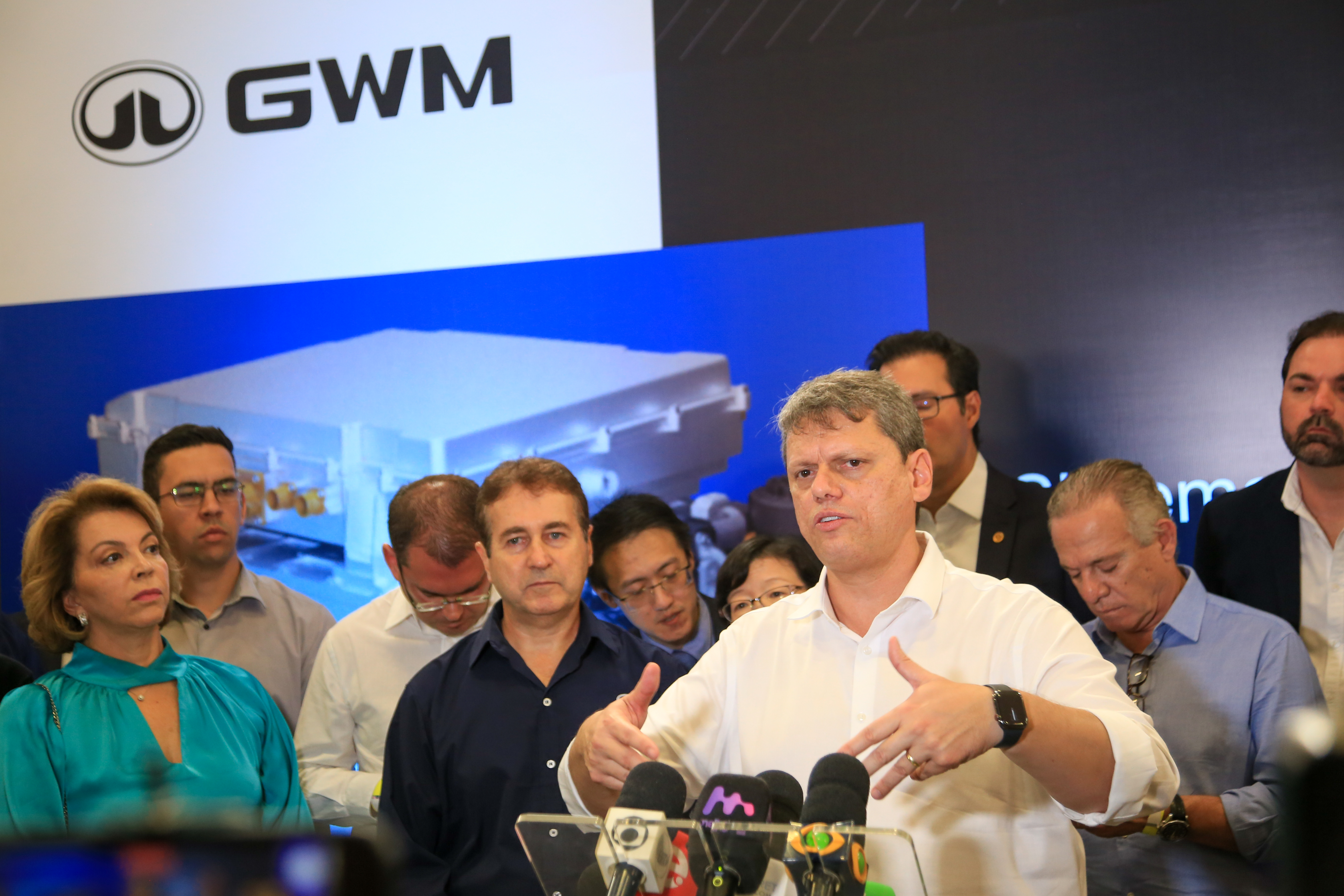
Tarcísio de Freitas, governor of São Paulo visiting GWM Brazilian facility in Iracemápolis in 2023

On 18 August 2021, the company announced the start of operations in Brazil with the acquisition of a former Mercedes-Benz plant in the city Iracemápolis, São Paulo. The annual production capacity would reach 100,000 vehicles, and would create nearly 2,000 local jobs. The production would cover both Brazil domestic market and the rest of South America. On 27 January 2022, details and launch of factory was presented. According to news reports in 2022, GWM will offer 10 models in Brazil, most will be hybrid electric SUVs and pickup trucks, with a planned investment of R$10 billion. The production in the Iracemápolis plant is scheduled to start in July 2025.

=== Europe ===
GWM started exporting vehicles to Italy in 2006. There was an investigation on GWM vehicles in 2014 in Italy to inspect for the presence of asbestos.

In 2021, GWM opened a new European base in Munich in order to launch the Ora Good Cat EV in France, Germany, Italy, Ireland, Norway, Spain and the United Kingdom. The car was rebranded as the Ora Funky Cat in many of these markets. The company was also considering opening a plant in Europe. In May 2024, GWM announced it would close its European office in Munich by August but affirmed its continued presence in European markets.

==== Bulgaria ====
Together with the Bulgarian company Litex Motors, Great Wall has a production base in Bahovitsa, near the town of Lovech, Bulgaria, that became operational in February 2012. As of 2012, the factory had the capacity to assemble 2,000 cars per year from knock-down kits. Initially only making the Voleex C10, the factory later added production of an SUV and a pick-up, the Hover 6 and the Steed 5.

As of January 2015, the company had a production output of about 5,000 vehicles per year (the Hover H6 and the Steed 5 models) and was planning to reach up to 8,000 vehicles within a year or two. By mid-2016, the company had a total of 14 dealerships in 12 Bulgarian cities, three of them in the capital Sofia.

==== Russia ====
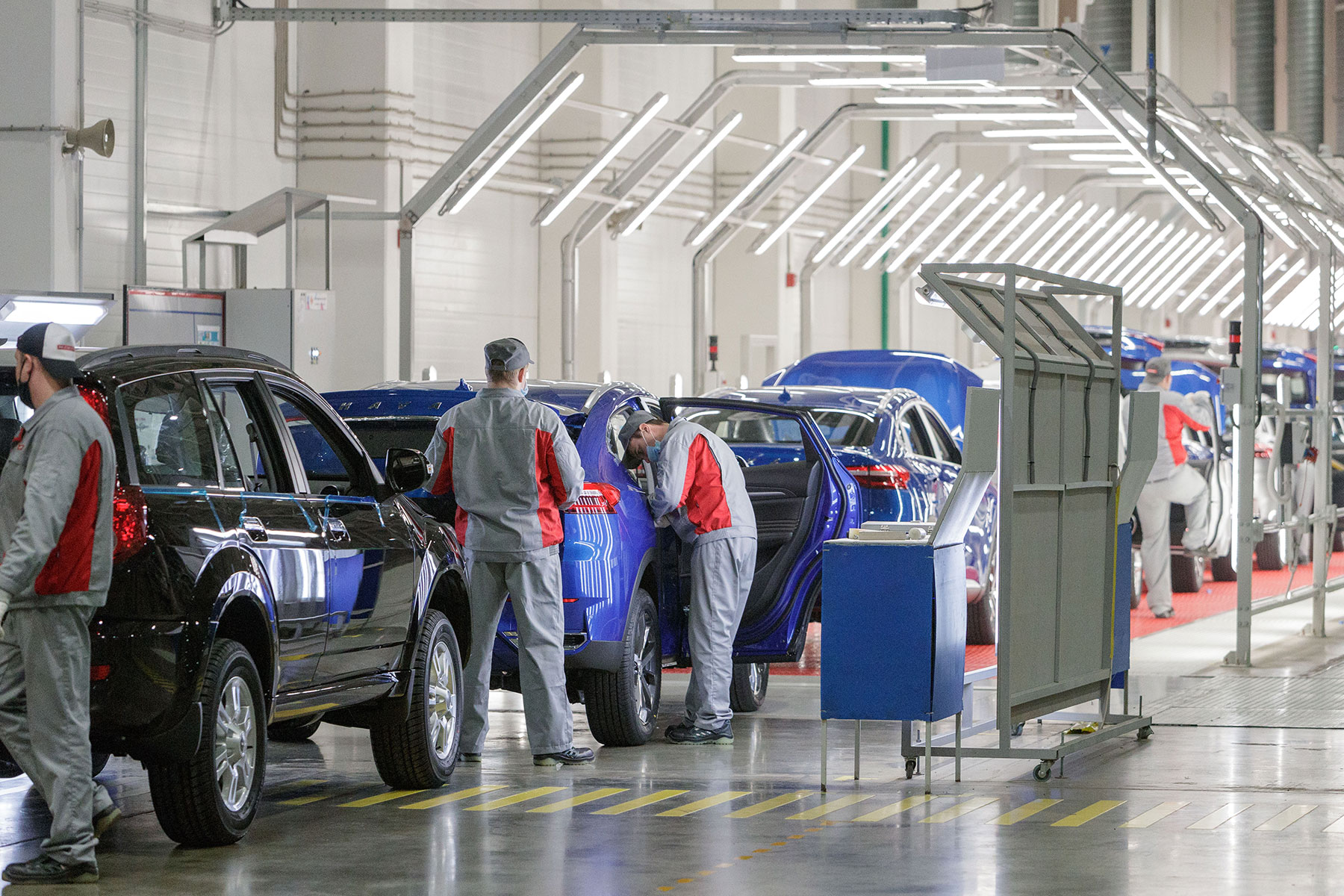
Assembly line at the Haval manufacturing plant in Tula Oblast, Russia

In September 2015, GWM broke ground on a new assembly plant located in the Tula Region, Russia. The plant is slated to have a total production capacity of 150,000 units per year if the project is successful enough to warrant a second phase of expansion. Initially scheduled to open in 2017, the facility is touted as an "all-process vehicle plant". The Russian plant went operational in June 2019, producing Haval models such as the F7 and H9.

Following the withdrawal of global manufacturers in the aftermath of Russia's invasion of Ukraine, GWM experienced a significant surge in sales and revenue in Russia. In the first nine months of 2023, GWM saw a fourfold increase in sales in the Russian market, selling over 84,500 vehicles across its three brands: Great Wall pickups, Haval crossovers, and Tank SUVs. The Haval brand accounted for the majority, with 73,600 cars, including 36,400 units of the locally assembled Haval Jolion. Approximately 40% of GWM's total unit sales in the Russian market were imports, while the remaining 60% consisted of vehicles assembled locally in Tula.

Because of company's continued business with Russia amid Russian invasion of Ukraine, GWM is listed among International Sponsors of War by Ukrainian National Agency on Corruption Prevention.

=== Iran ===
The Iranian motor company Diar has assembled Great Wall vehicles from knock-down kits.

=== Pakistan ===
The Pakistani automotive manufacturer Sazgar assembles Haval SUVs under a joint venture with GWM since 2022. Under this joint venture, the Haval H6 HEV became the first hybrid electric vehicle to be assembled in Pakistan. In February 2024, Sazgar launched the GWM Ora 03. In August 2024, Ora 07 was launched. With the edition of models like the Jolion and Tank 500, GWM is expanding their NEV and ICE lineup in Pakistan.

=== Southeast Asia ===
==== Thailand ====
In 2013, GWM had plans to invest $340 million for a new factory in Thailand, but this expansion effort was scrapped in early 2014. On February 17, 2020, General Motors announced it would exit from the Thai market and sell its Rayong plant to GWM by the end of the year. On 30 September 2020, GWM signed a share sales and purchase agreement with General Motors to acquire GM's production facilities in Rayong, with a plan to begin production in the first quarter of 2021 with automobile production capacity of 80,000 units annually.

In October 2023, GWM announced plans to produce eight electric vehicle models at its Rayong plant in Thailand, starting in the first quarter of 2024. In January 2024, the company began the production of the Ora Good Cat. It is the first electric vehicle produced at its Rayong plant.

==== Malaysia ====
Great Wall Motor Sales Malaysia was set up in 2022 in Kuala Lumpur, with the company having a warehouse in the Klang Valley and plans to partner with Go Auto Group for localized CKD assembly of its models. In July 2022, GWM was officially introduced in Malaysia with sales commenced in November of the same year, with the Ora Good Cat. In May 2023, GWM introduced its first pickup truck in the country, the GWM Cannon Ultra.

==== Philippines ====
In April 2023, GWM entered the Philippine market under Luxuriant Automotive Group, initially offering the Haval Jolion (HEV and non-HEV variants), Haval H6 and GWM Cannon.

==== Indonesia ====
In August 2023, GWM entered Indonesia under a joint venture distributor between Inchcape plc and Indomobil Group. The brand made its appearance at the 30th Gaikindo Indonesia International Auto Show. The event showcased their range of hybrid and electric vehicles under the Haval, Tank and Ora brands. GWM vehicles went on sale in Indonesia in March 2024.

=== South Africa ===
GWM made its debut in South Africa in March 2007, initially through an import partnership. In 2014, the local subsidiary GWM South Africa was founded.

As of 2026, the company operates 111 dealerships throughout SA, through which it retails a total of 10 distinct models across the GWM, Haval, Ora, and Tank brands.

== Brands ==
In the early 2010s, GWM began differentiating its SUV, passenger car, and pick-up truck offerings under the names Haval, Voleex, and Wingle, respectively. By 2013, Haval became an independent brand, and the Voleex nameplate was discontinued around 2016. By 2020, GWM ceased selling passenger cars under the Great Wall brand in certain international markets, with all SUVs now carrying the Haval name. Pick-up trucks, including the replacement for the Great Wall Steed, were branded under the GWM marque. Additionally, GWM introduced three new brands: Wey in 2017 for premium vehicles, Ora in 2018 for electric vehicles, and Tank in 2021 for luxury off-roaders. In the early 2020s, Great Wall Commercial Vehicles was formed to manufacture trucks.

=== Current brands ===
==== GWM ====
Initially, as the core brand of Great Wall Motor, GWM manufactured various types of vehicles. Over time, the brand was repositioned to focus to pick-up trucks. GWM introduced a sub-brand called Poer (pronounced as power), which stands for Powerful, Off-road, Enjoyable, and Reliable. Models such as the GWM Poer P11 and GWM Poer P12 are available in some markets overseas.

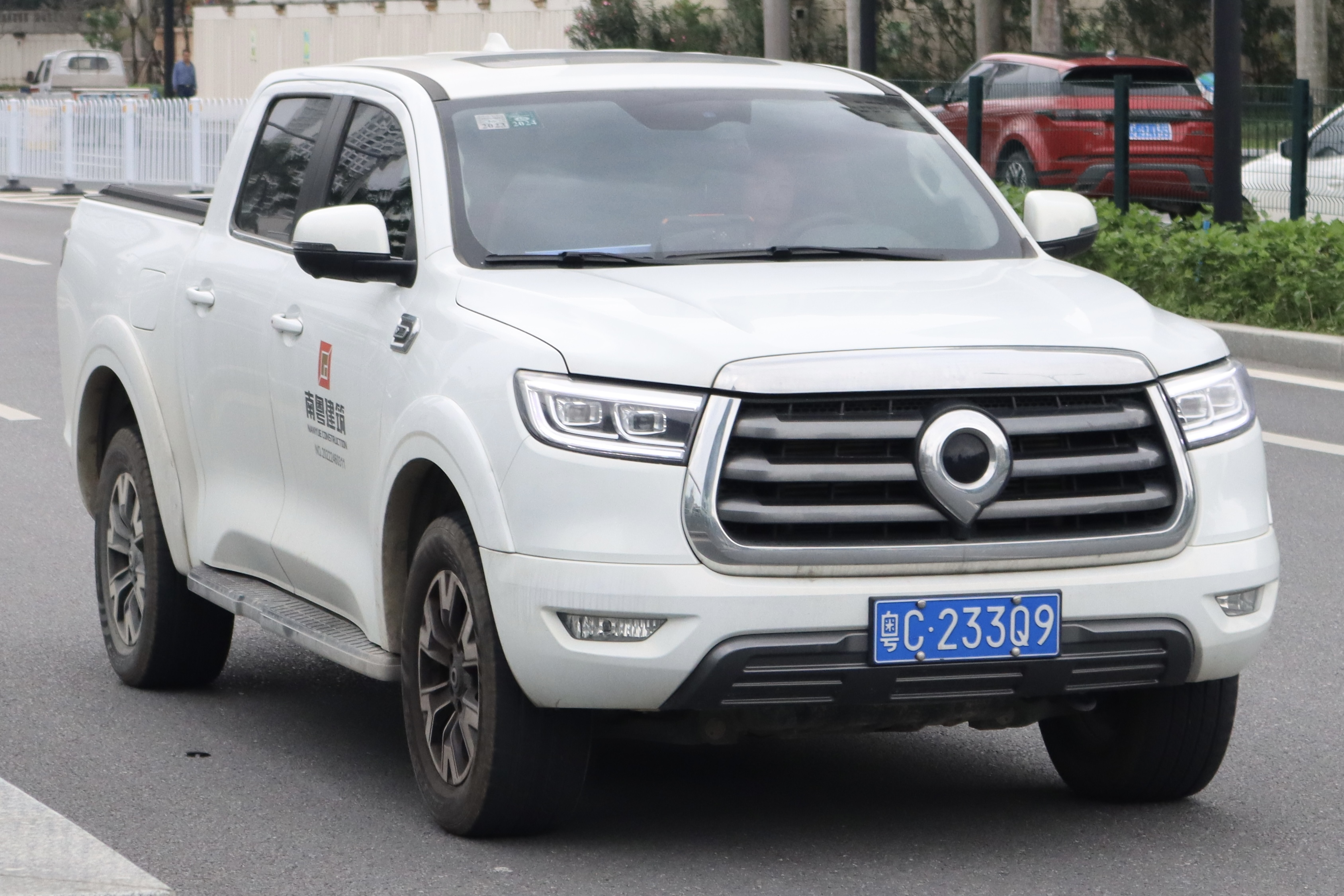
Great Wall Pao

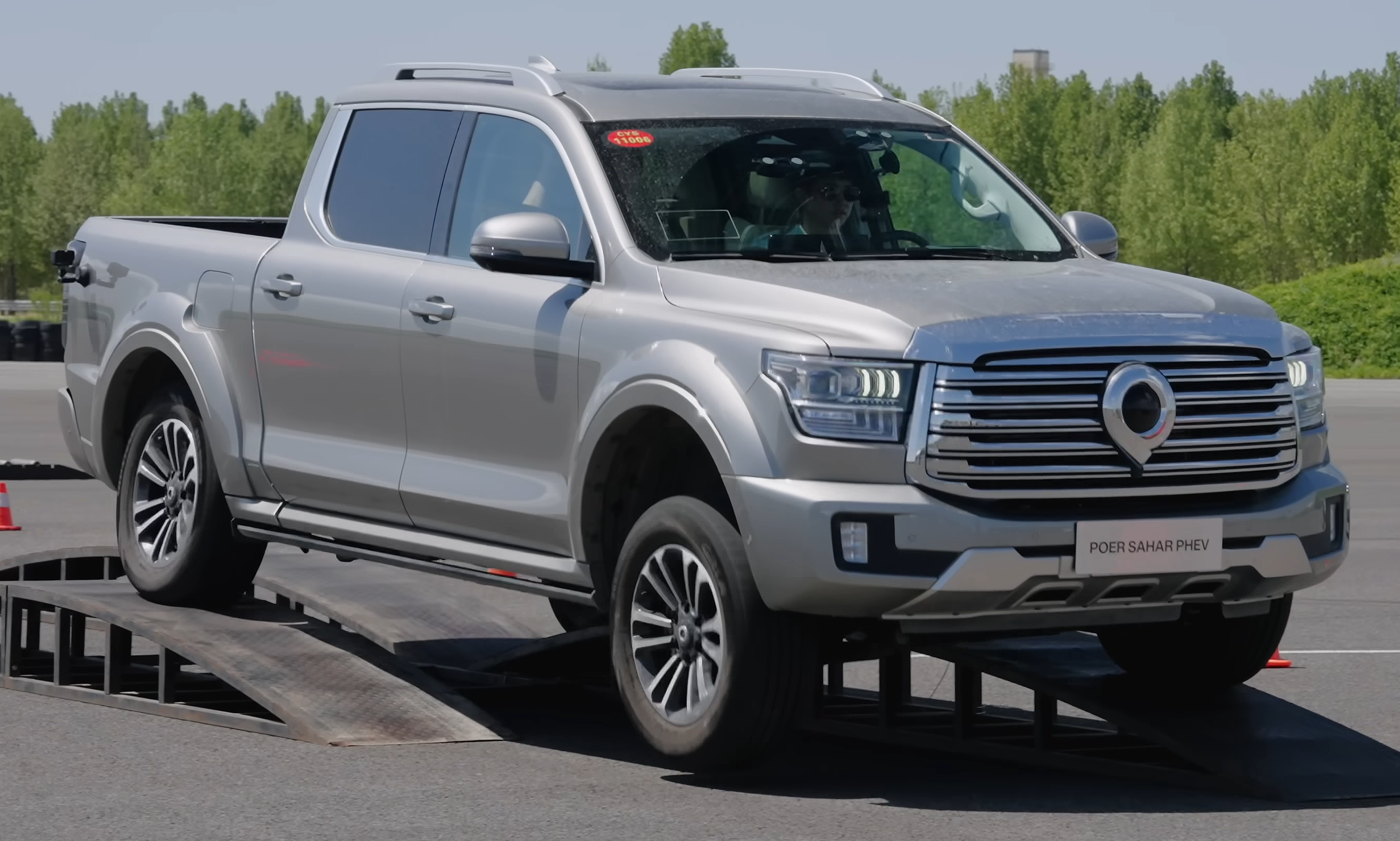
Great Wall Shanhai Cannon (also known as the GWM Poer Sahar)

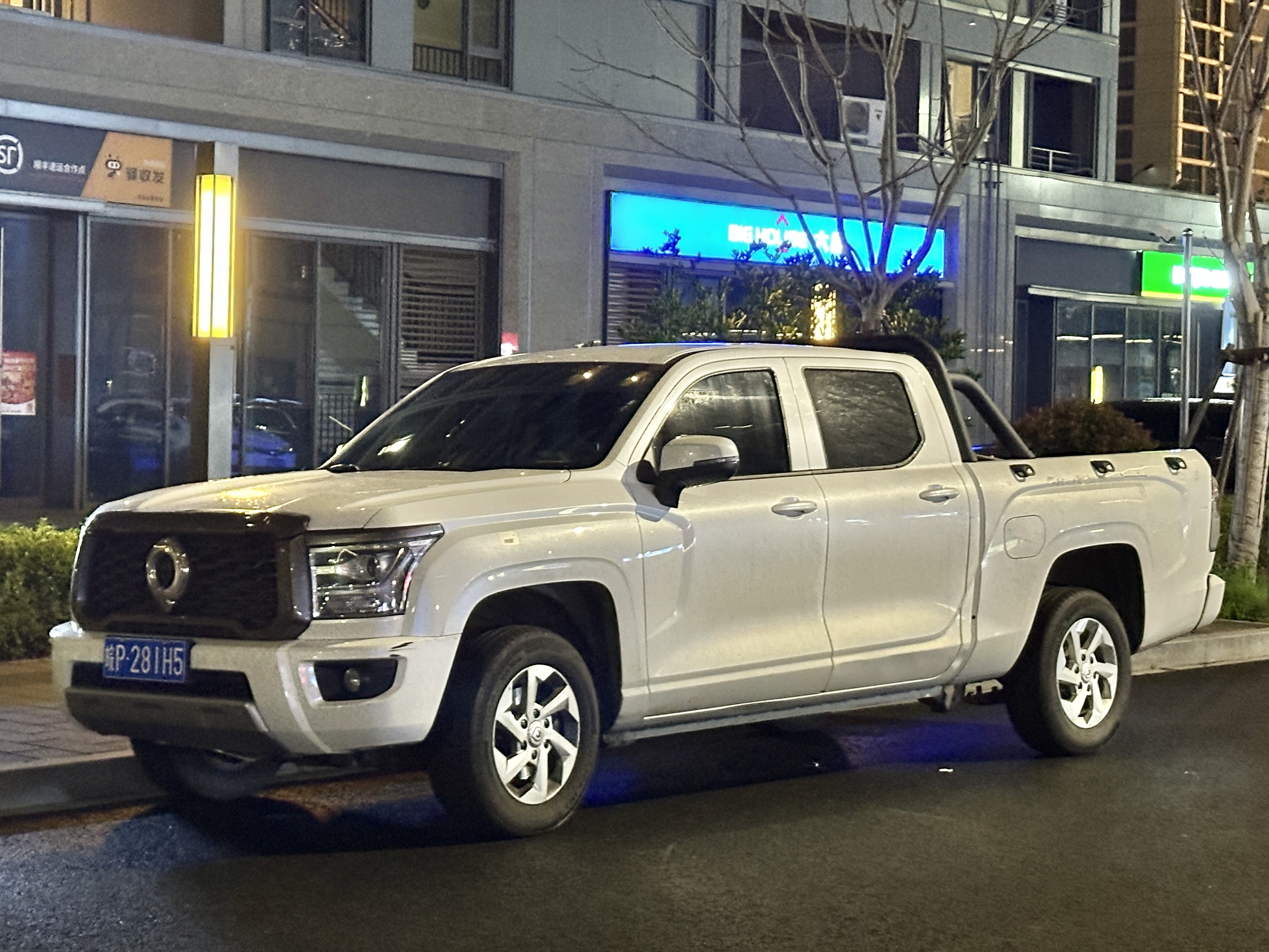
Great Wall King Kong Cannon

==== Haval ====
Haval (Chinese: 哈弗; pinyin: Hāfú) is GWM's SUV brand. The Haval name was first used by the Great Wall Haval CUV (initially romanised as Hover, later renamed to Haval H3), which was introduced in April 2005. Haval was spun-off from a product line of GWM to a standalone brand in March 2013.

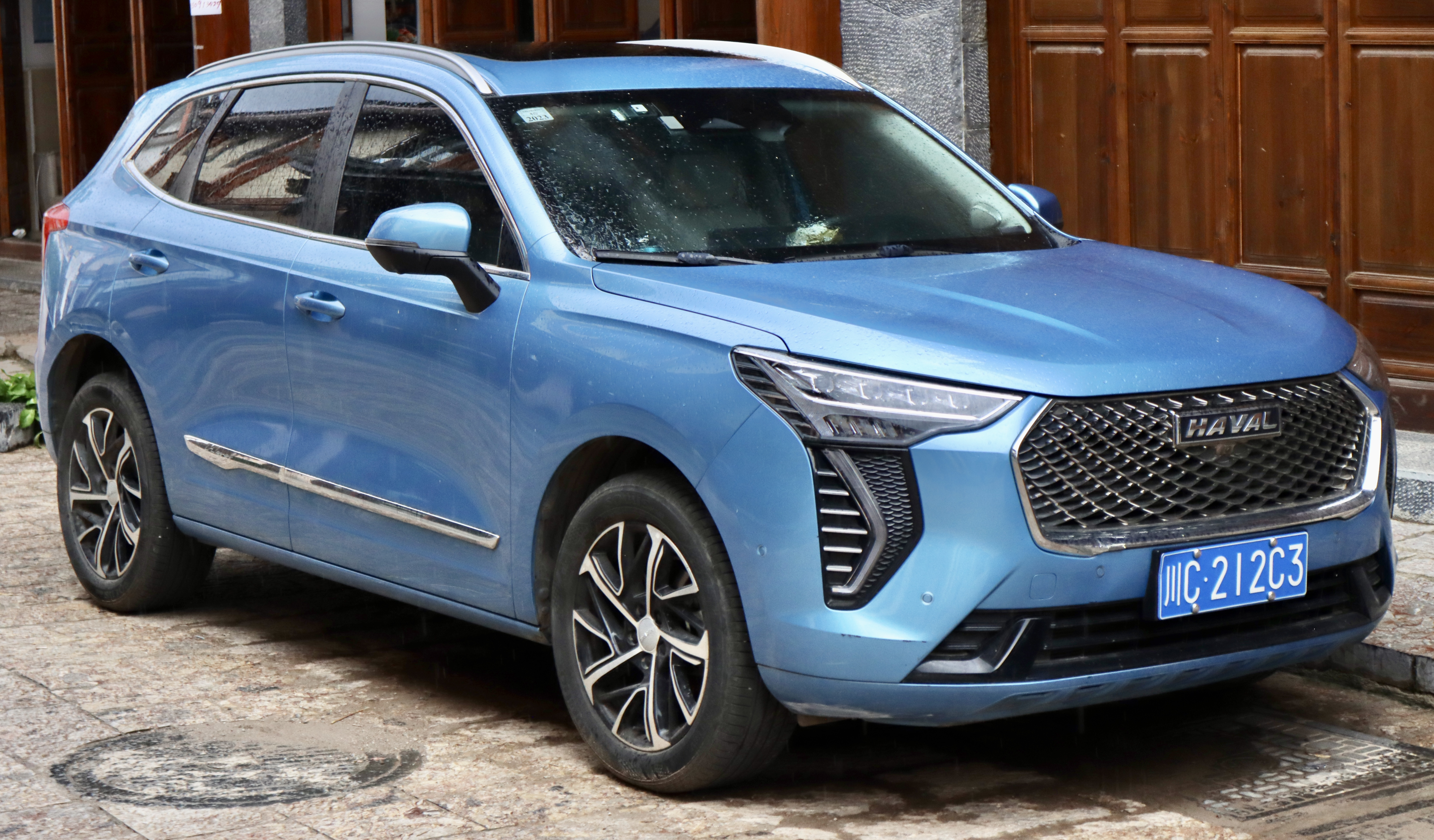
Haval Jolion

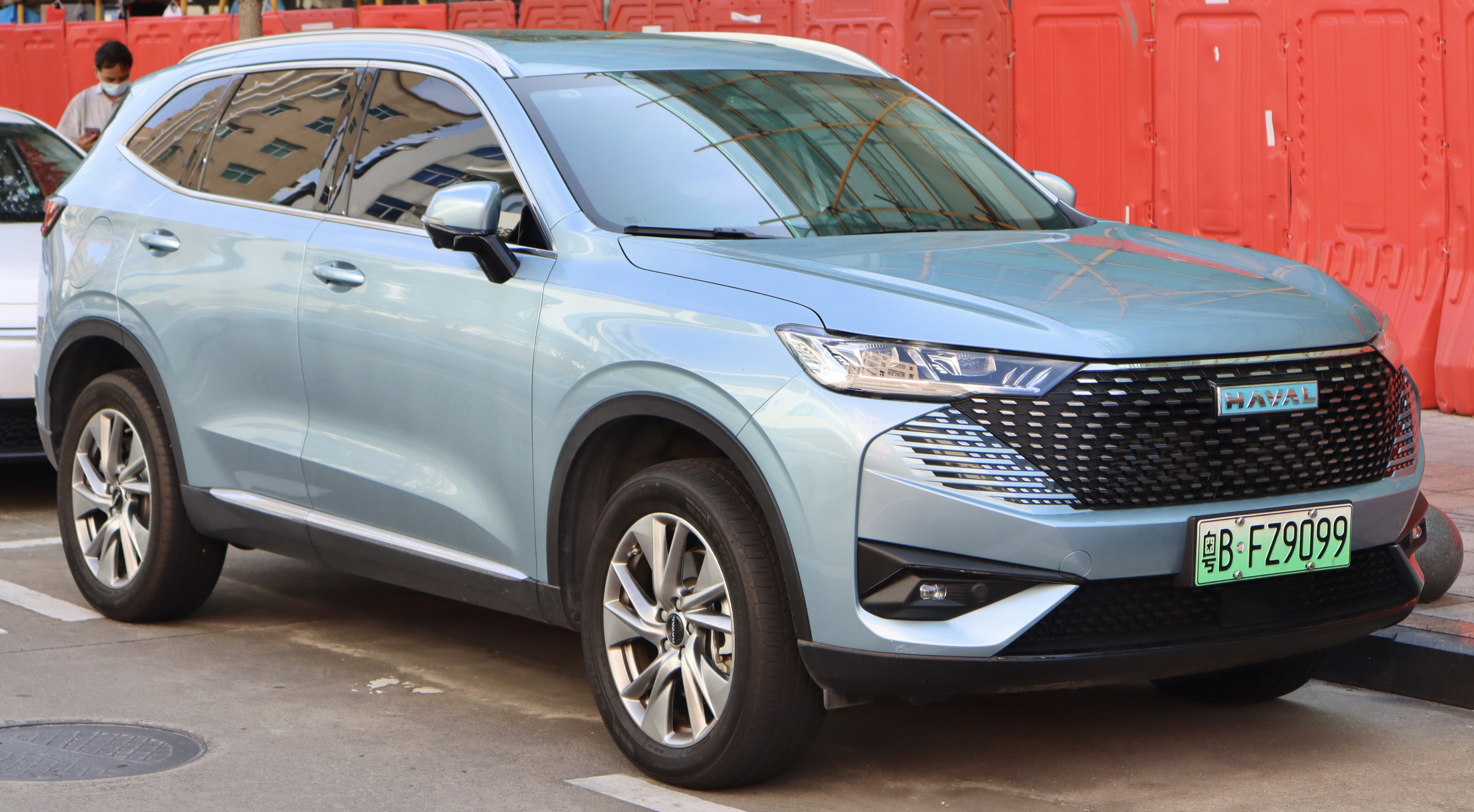
Haval H6

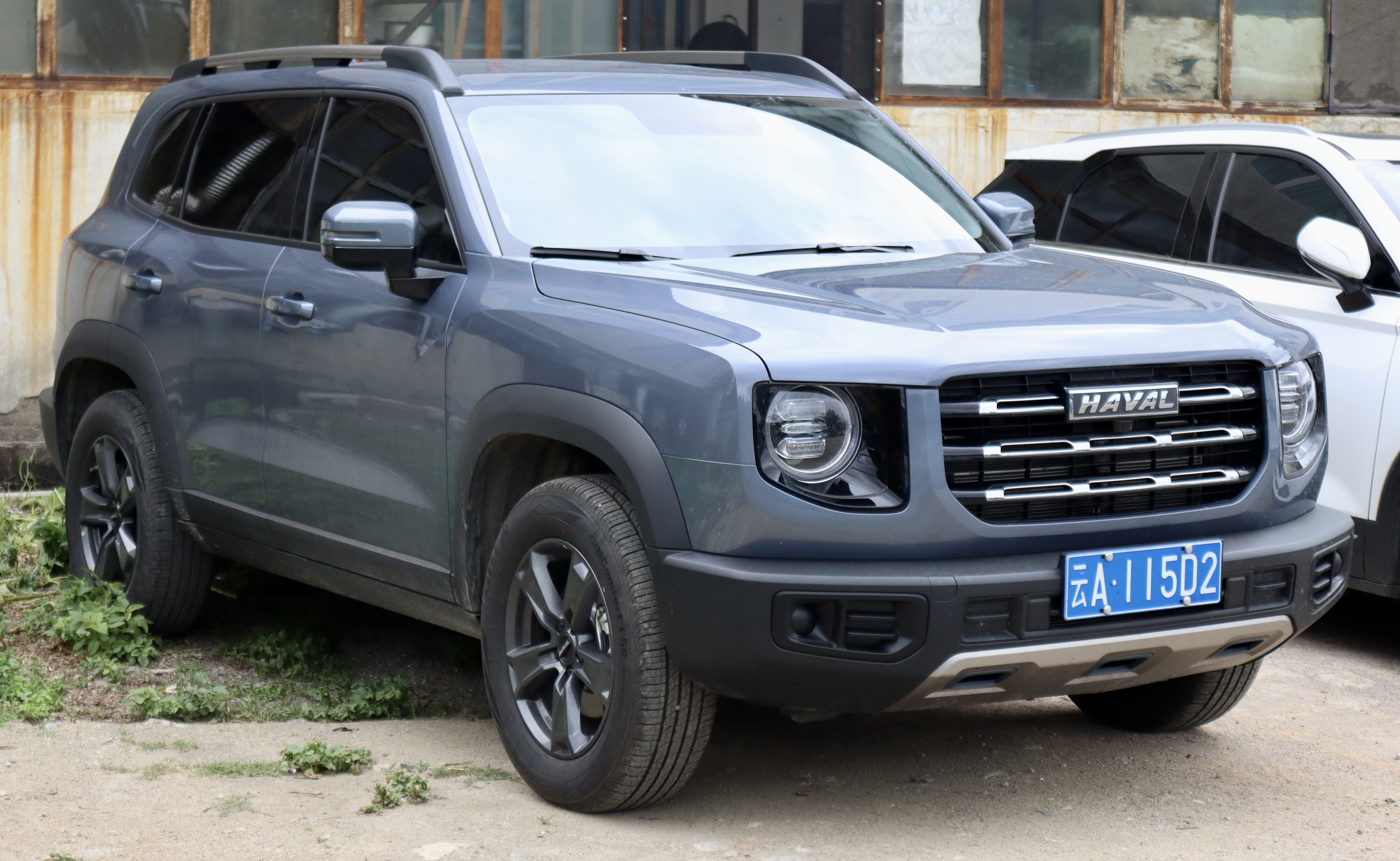
Haval Big Dog / Dagou / Dargo

==== Wey ====
Wey (Chinese: 魏牌; pinyin: Wèipái) is GWM's luxury marque, focusing on crossovers and SUVs. Launched in 2017, it is named after GWM chairman Wei Jianjun.

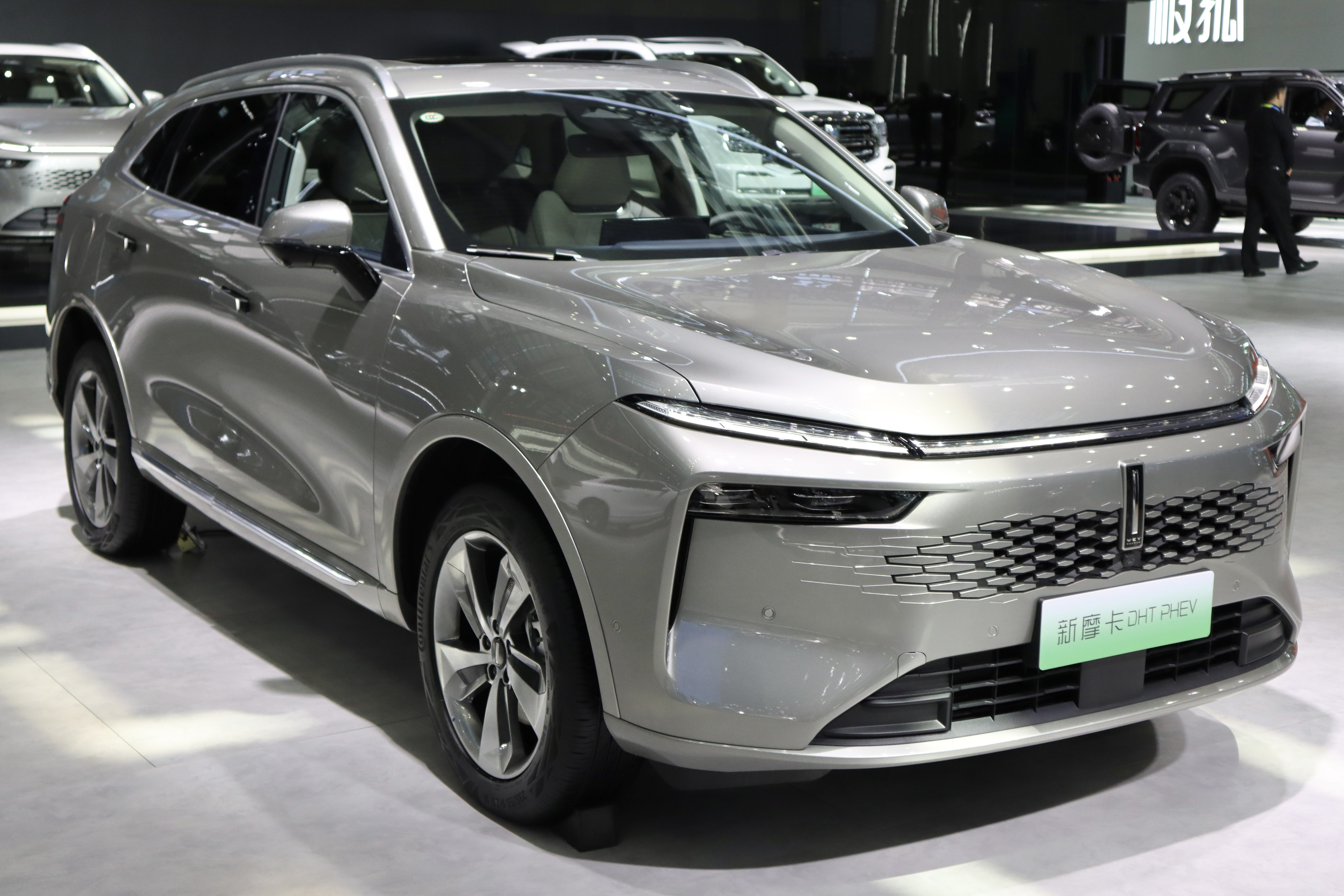
Wey Mocha

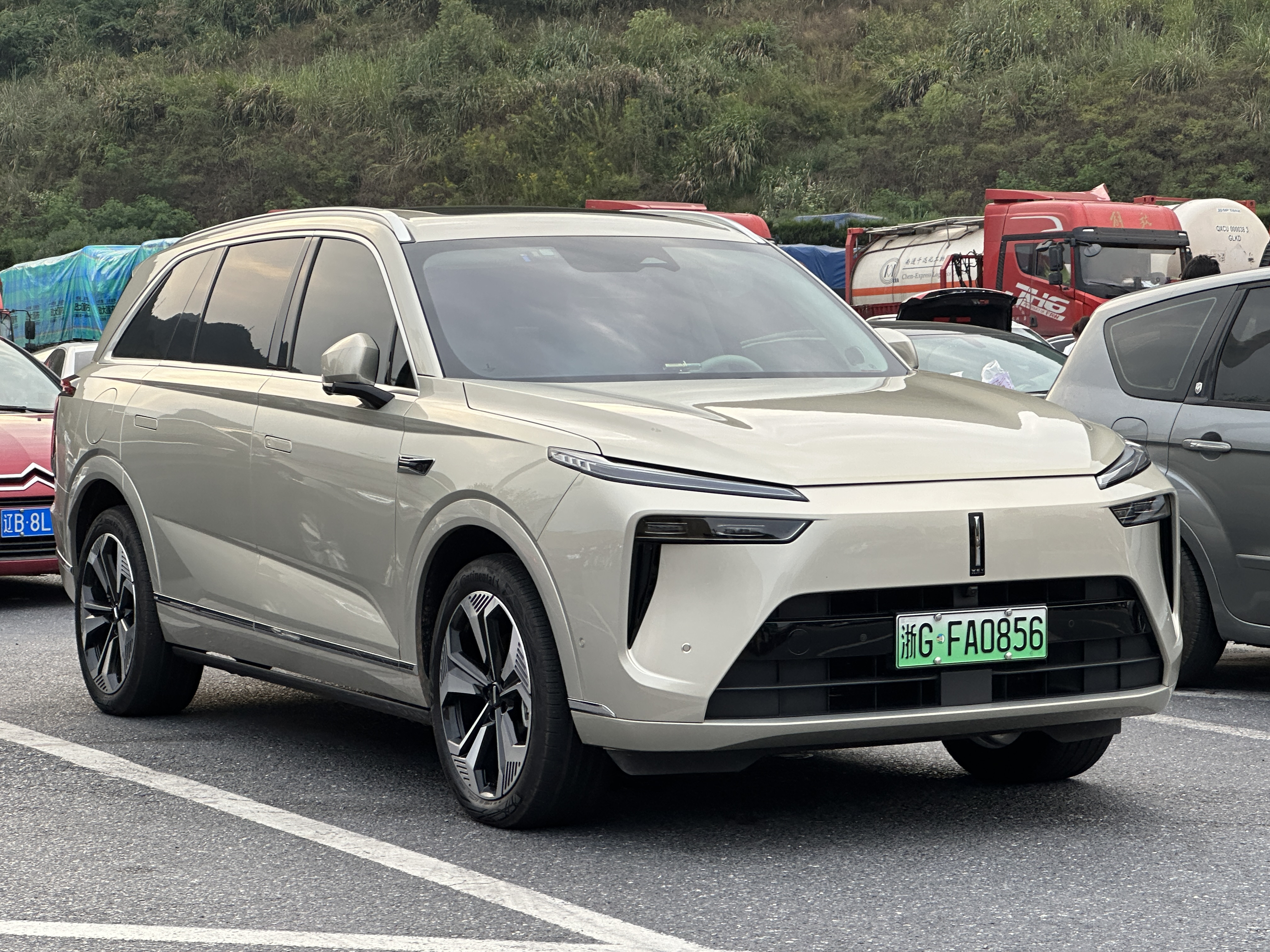
Wey Lanshan

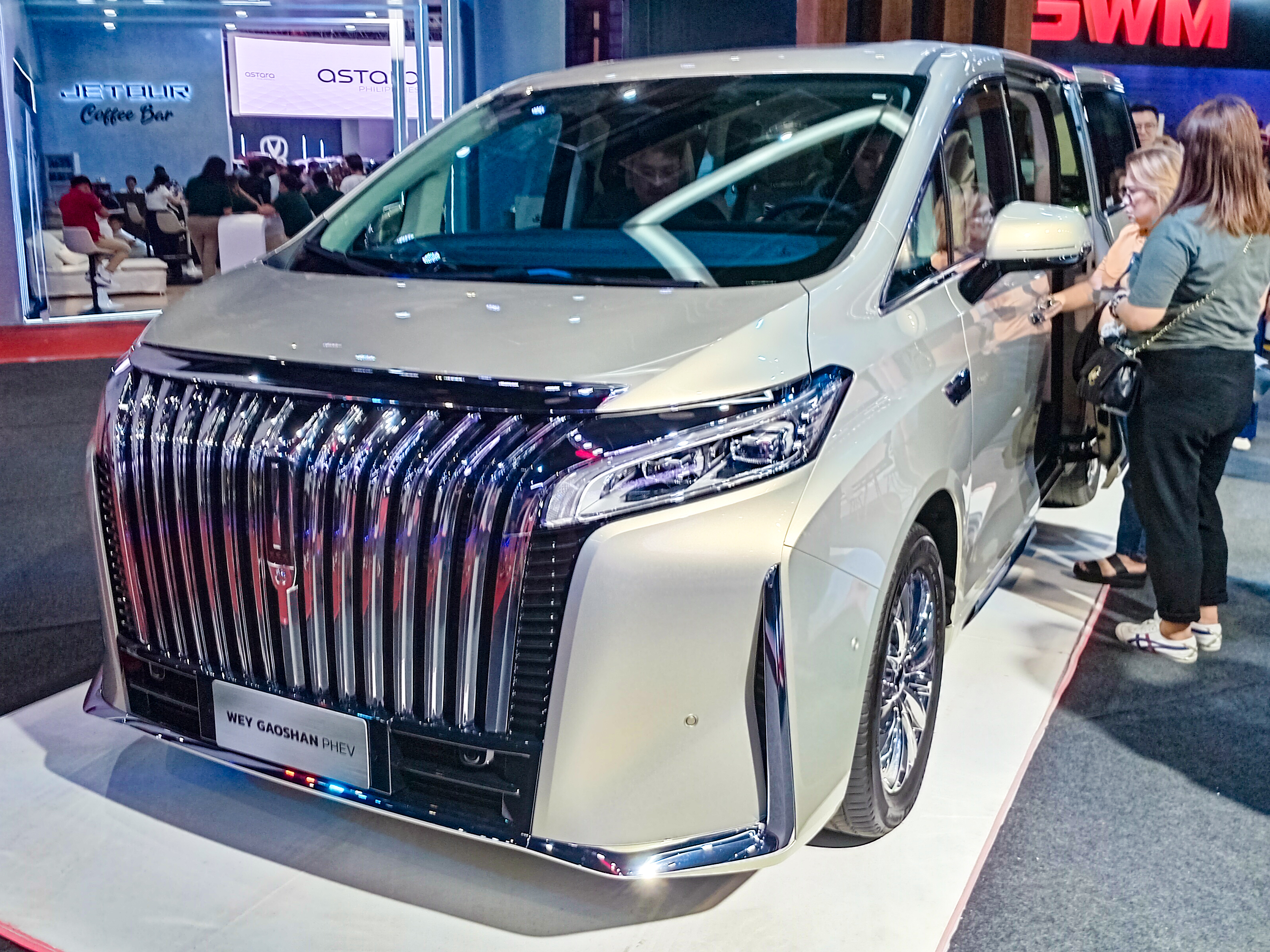
Wey Gaoshan

==== Ora ====
Ora (simplified Chinese: 欧拉; traditional Chinese: 歐拉; pinyin: Oūlā), also known as GWM Ora in some markets outside China, is GWM's electric car brand. The marque was officially launched with its first model Ora iQ in August 2018, targeting female consumers. According to GWM, Ora stands for 'open, reliable and alternative', while also paying homage to Leonhard Euler, a notable mathematician.

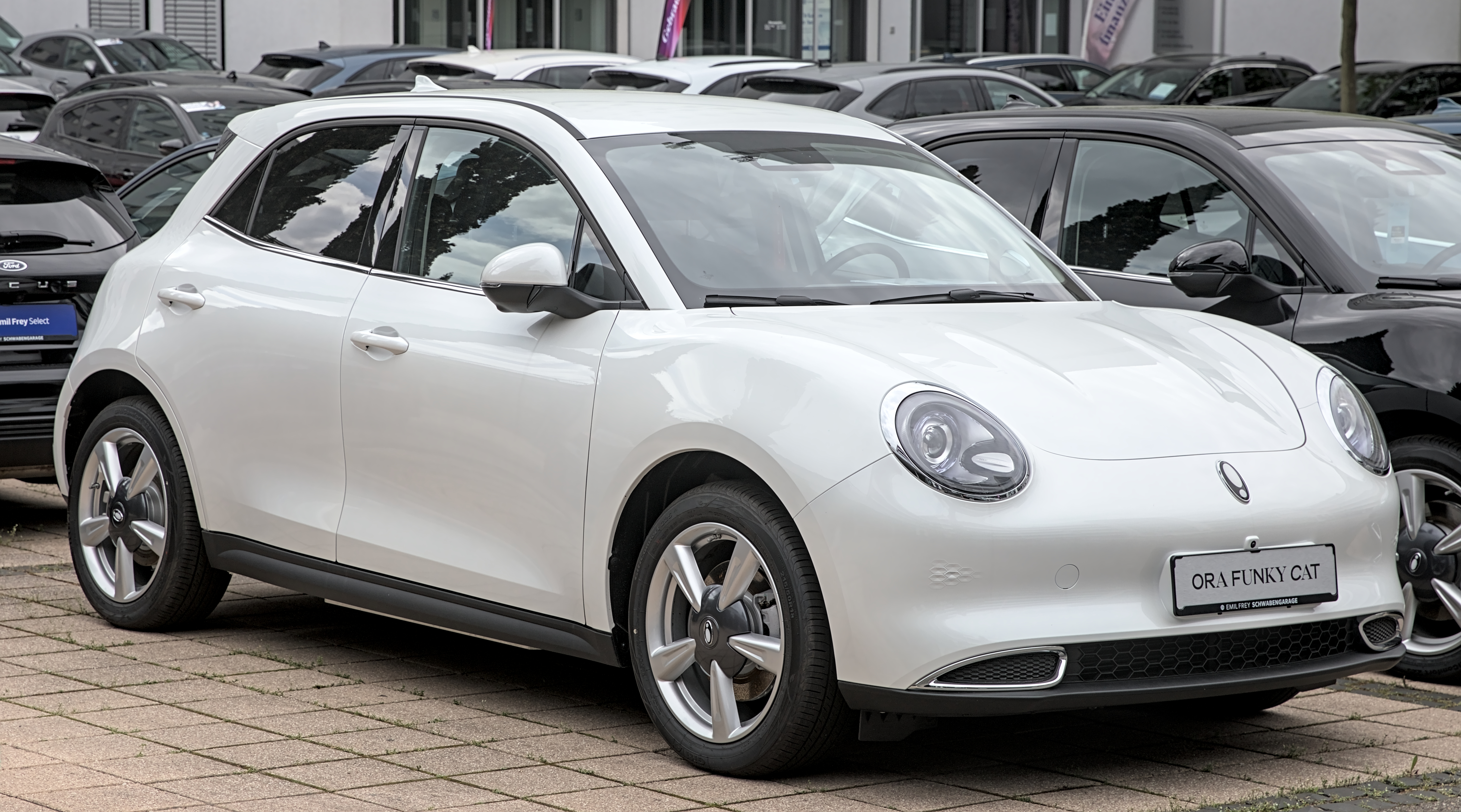
Ora Good Cat / Funky Cat / 03

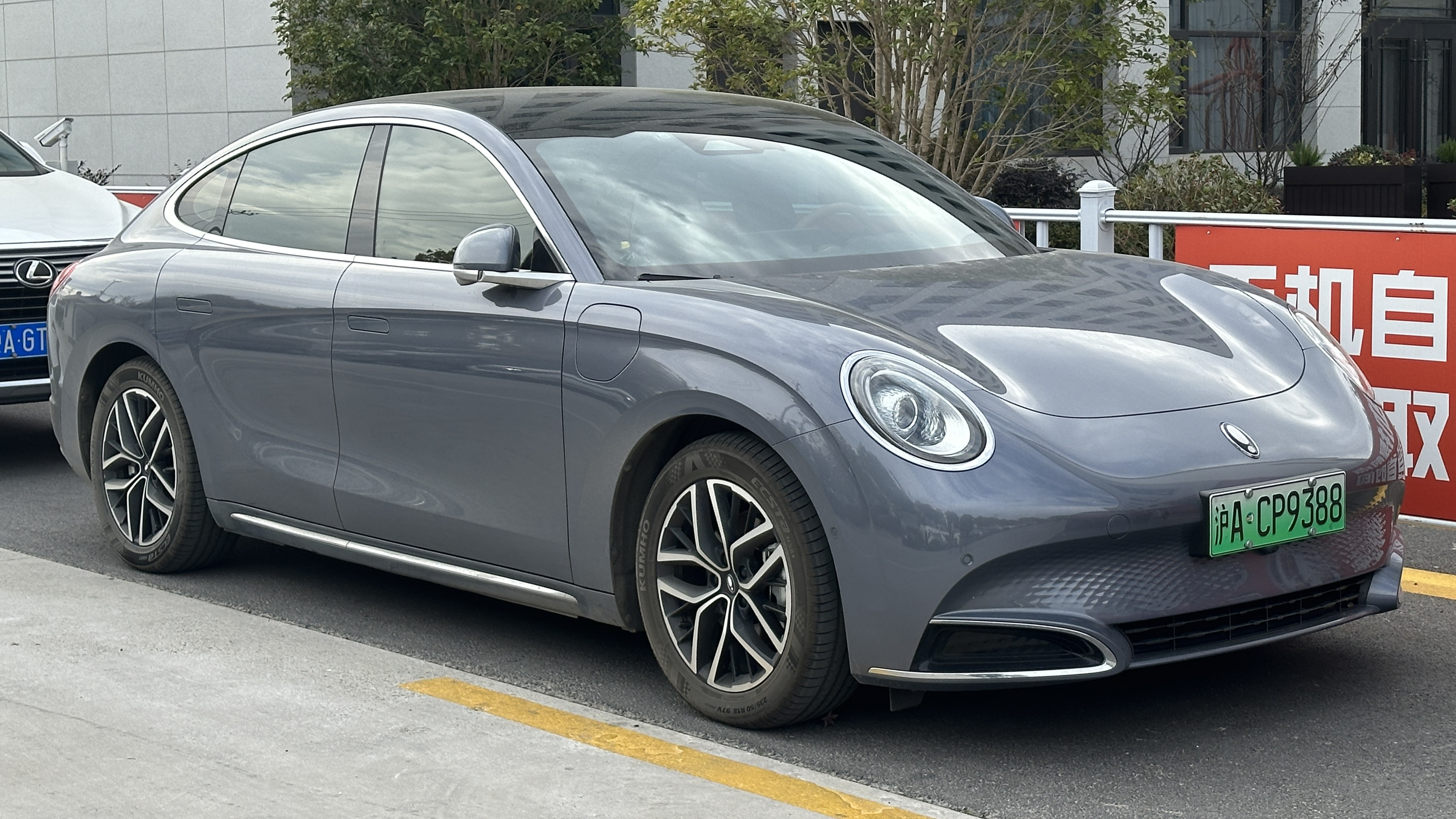
Ora Lightning Cat / 07

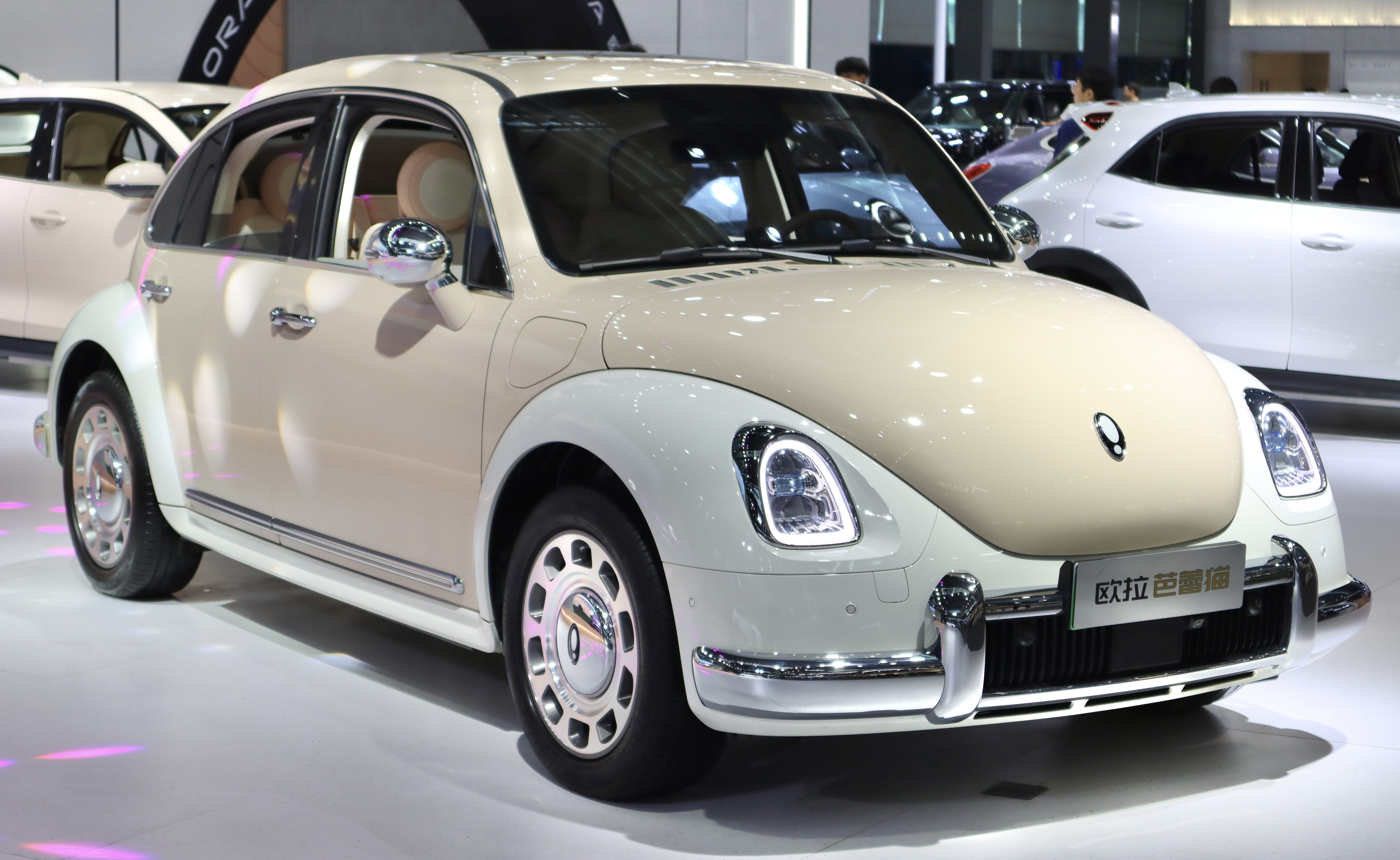
Ora Ballet Cat

==== Tank ====
Tank (Chinese: 坦克; pinyin: Tǎnkè), also known as GWM Tank in some markets outside China, is GWM's luxury off-road marque. Originally a sub-brand under Wey, Tank became independent due to its significantly different styling and brand proposition.

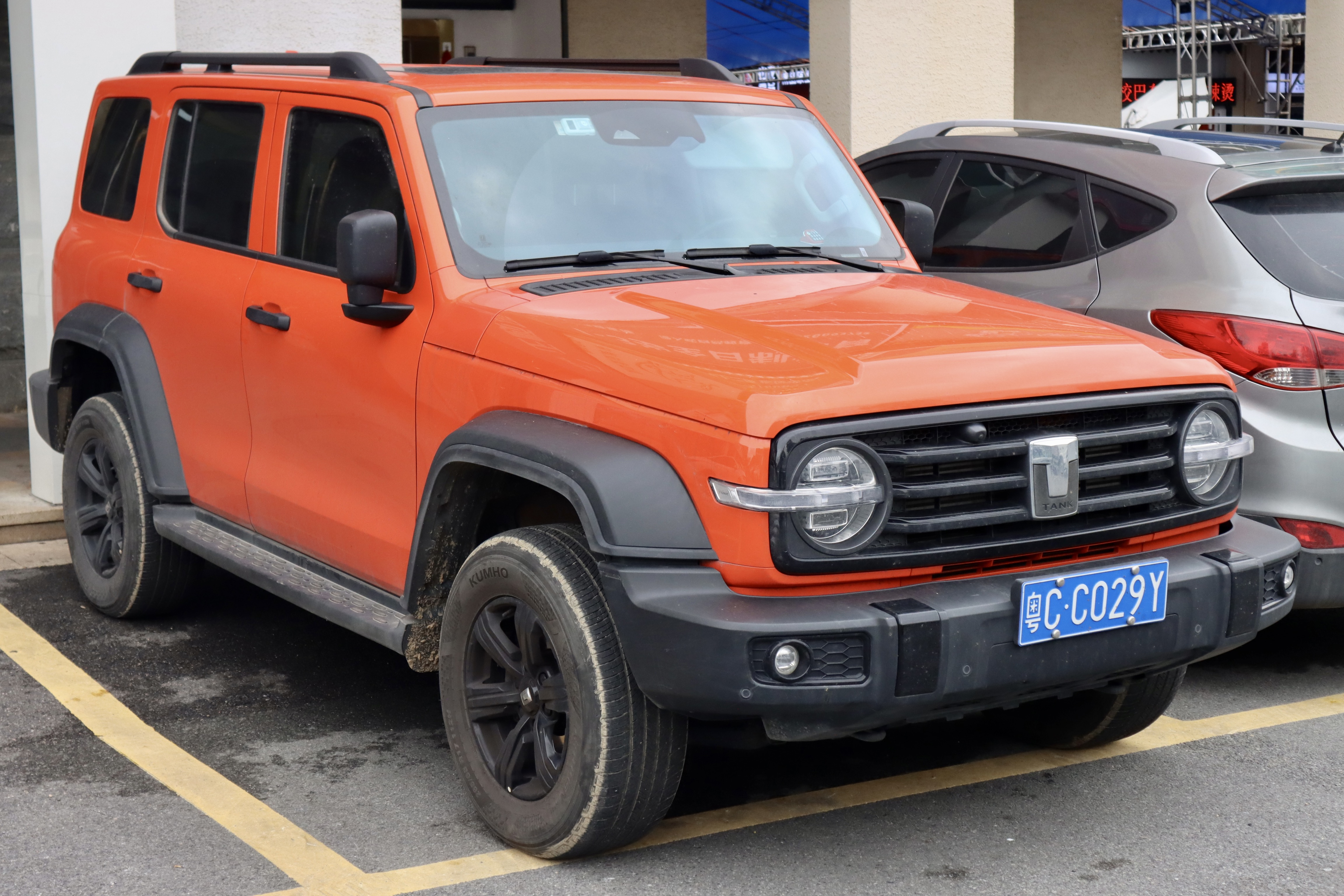
Tank 300

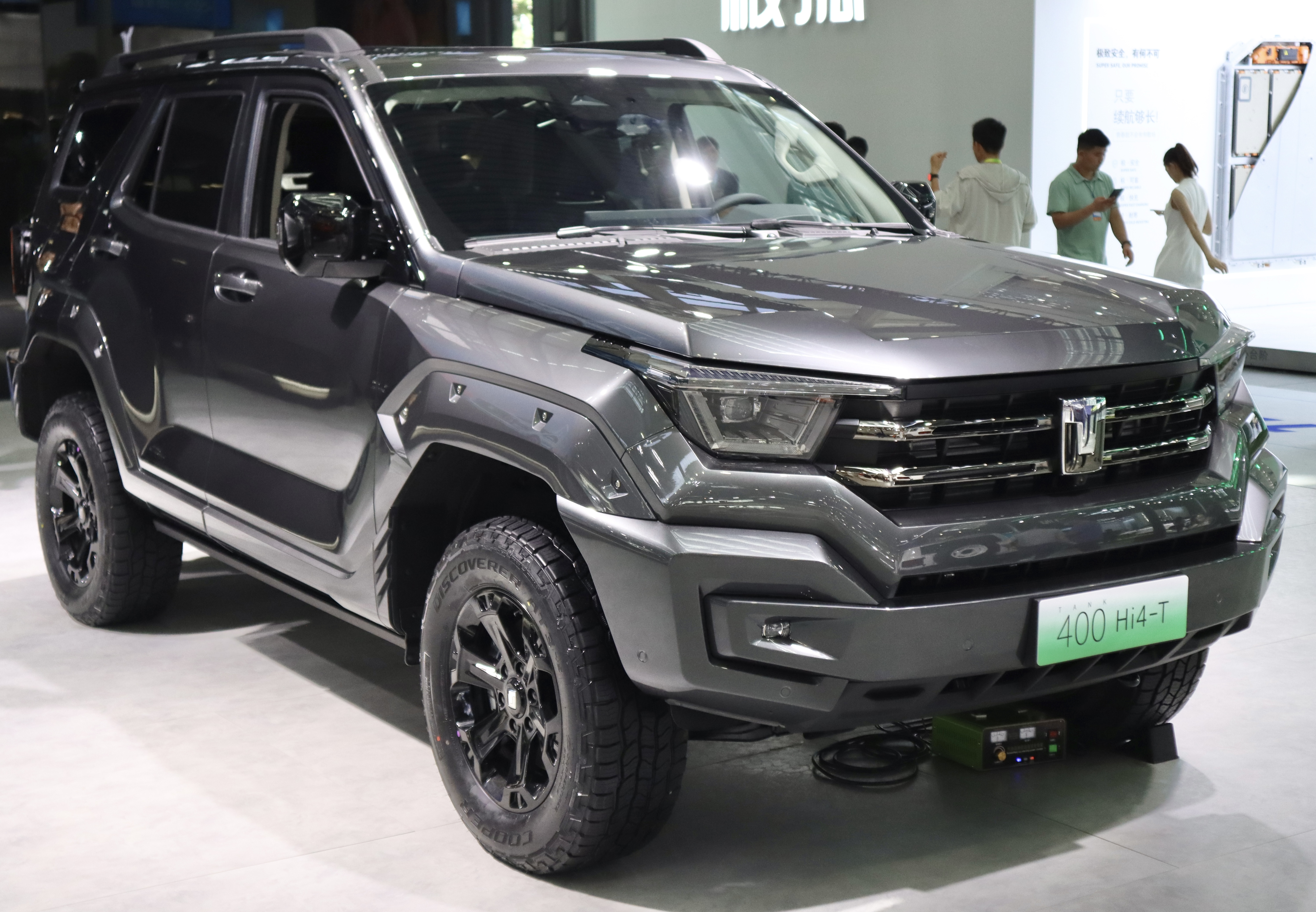
Tank 400

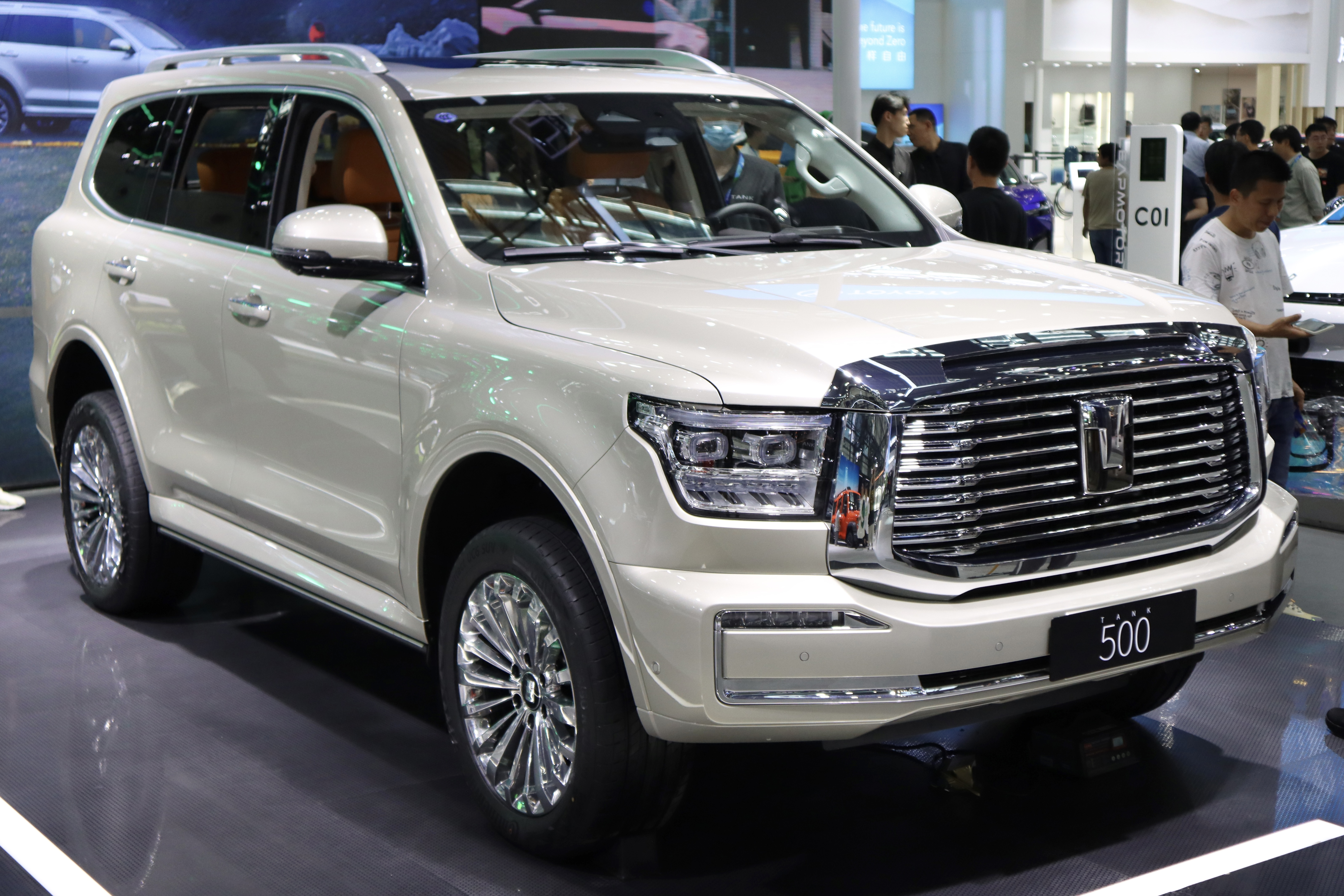
Tank 500

==== Changzheng ====
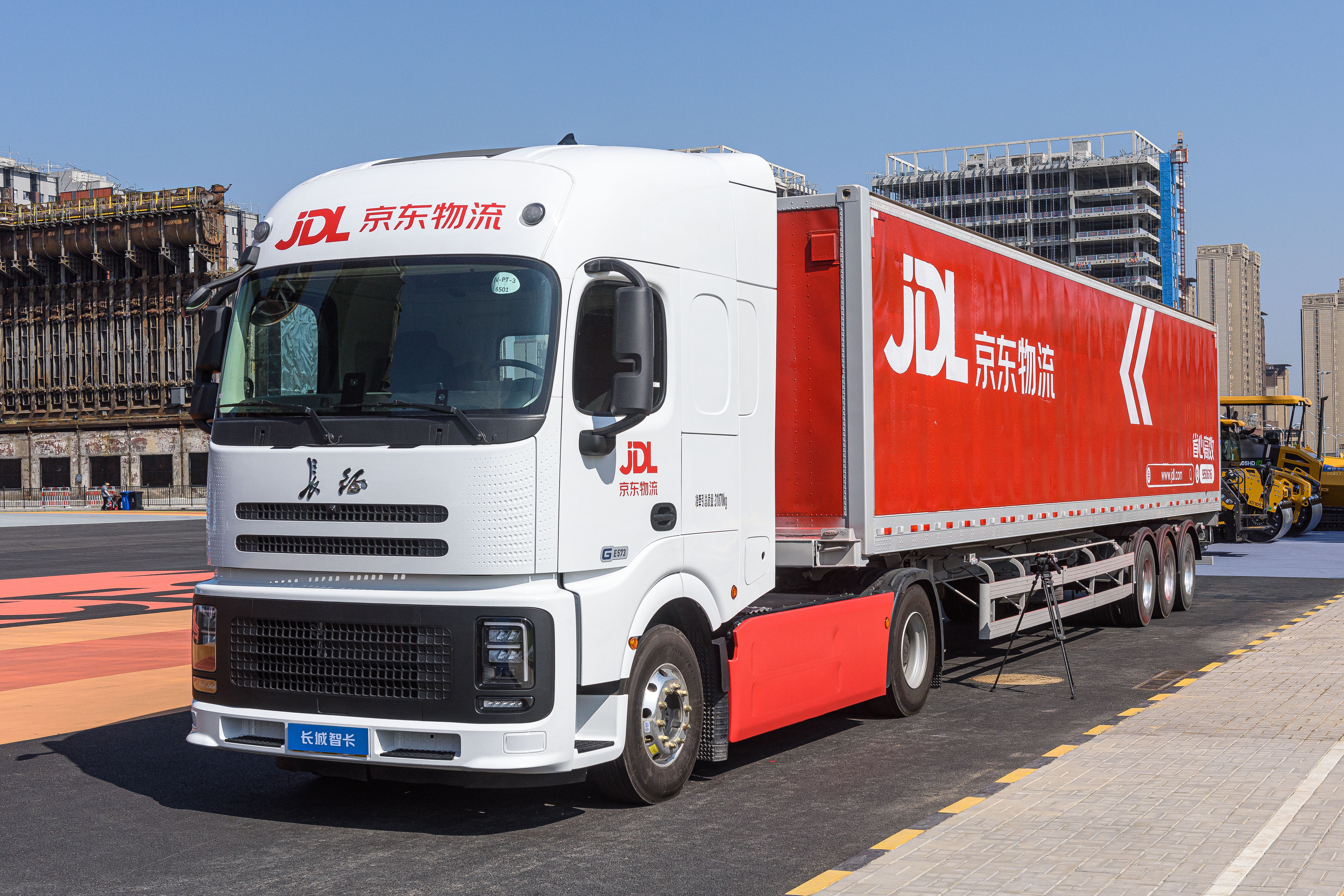
Changzheng Zhika GE573 truck

Changzheng (simplified Chinese: 长征; traditional Chinese: 長征; pinyin: Chángzhēng) is a heavy-truck manufacturer founded in Xingtai, Hebei, China in 1950. It was acquired by Great Wall Motor on 10 January 2022.

==== Souo ====
GWM Souo Moto (Chinese: 长城灵魂摩托; pinyin: Chángchéng línghún mótuō) or simply Souo is a luxury motorcycle brand established in 2024. Created as a "passion project" of Wei Jianjun, GWM's chairman, Souo mainly produces touring motorcycles.

- Souo S2000 (2024–present)
- Souo LH2000 (upcoming)

==== Confidence ====
Confidence (Chinese: 自信; pinyin: Zìxìn) is GWM's high-end luxury brand. It is currently planned to be launched in 2026.

=== Discontinued brand ===
==== Sar ====
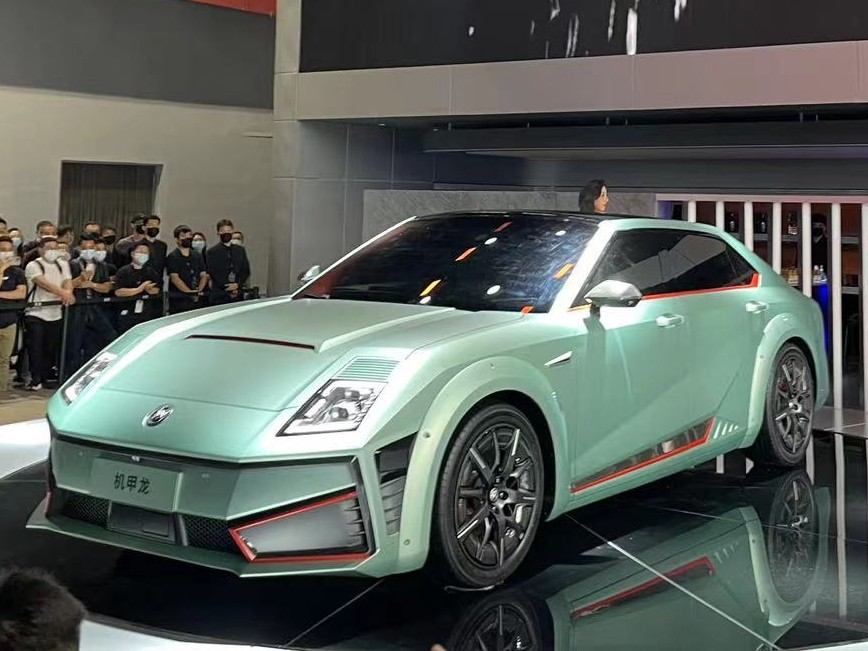
Sar Mecha Dragon

Sar Auto (Chinese: 沙龙汽车; pinyin: Shālóng Qìchē; lit. 'Saloon Auto'), is a high-end luxury electric brand under GWM, founded in 2021 with its first product Sar Mecha Dragon. Initial plans were to produce electric luxury sedans and SUVs. In March 2023, the Sar brand was cancelled without selling a single vehicle, and the Sar Mecha Dragon was transferred under the Ora brand.

== Technologies ==
=== Platforms ===
- Guiyuan (归元)
  - Guiyuan S
- Hi4-T, Off-road Super Hybrid Architecture
- Hi4-Z
- Hi4-G, Class 8 truck

=== Software ===
- Coffee AI
- Coffee OS
  - Coffee OS 3
- Coffee Pilot
  - Coffee Pilot Ultra
- Coffee EEA, GEEP4.0 electronic architecture

== Joint venture ==
=== Spotlight Automotive ===
In November 2019, GWM and BMW Group established a joint venture to develop and produce Mini-branded battery electric vehicles in China. The joint venture is called Spotlight Automotive Ltd. A manufacturing plant in Zhangjiagang, Jiangsu was constructed between 2020 and 2022. The first mass-produced vehicle, a Mini Cooper SE (J01) rolled off from the plant on 14 October 2023.

== Marketing ==
=== Offroad tiering ===
- Urban SUV, Wey Lanshan
- General offroad, Haval Big Dog
- Strong offroad, Tank 500 Hi4-T
- Super strong offroad, Unimog

== Sales ==
=== Global sales ===
GWM sales by brand
Year	Total	Great Wall	Haval	Wey	Ora	Tank
2010	415,779	265,368	150,411	-	-	-
2011	518,965	353,407	165,558	-	-	-
2012	672,234	387,942	284,292	-	-	-
2013	803,449	384,303	419,196	-	-	-
2014	767,825	337,264	430,561	-	-	-
2015	871,315	204,663	666,652	-	-	-
2016	1,086,639	147,206	939,433	-	-	-
2017	1,085,654	144,385	854,842	86,427	-	-
2018	1,072,529	158,752	770,776	139,486	3,515	-
2019	1,097,451	166,057	792,586	99,943	38,865	-
2020	1,111,598	226,609	750,228	78,500	56,261	-
2021	1,280,993	233,006	770,008	58,363	135,028	84,588
2022	1,067,523	186,553	616,550	36,381	103,996	123,881
2023	1,230,704	202,330	715,188	41,602	108,518	162,539
2024	1,233,292	177,100	706,234	54,728	63,272	231,001
2025	1,323,672	181,660	758,554	101,954	48,289	232,713

=== Exports ===
Year	Exports
2021	142,793
2022	173,180
2023	316,018
2024	453,141
2025	506,066

== Motorsport ==
=== Dakar ===
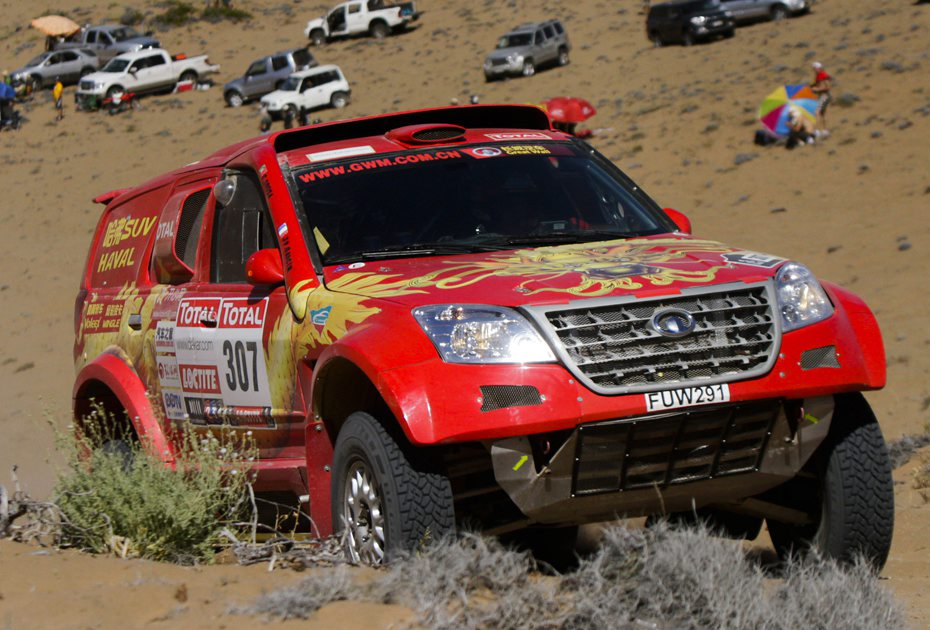
Team Great Wall number 307 in the 2012 Dakar Rally

The company made appearances at the Dakar Rally previously. In 2010, it first entered the race as car number 389, with a modified model based on Haval H3, and ranked 33rd. The next year it finished 22nd as car number 373. Its best rankings were achieved in the 2012 and 2013 editions, when the team finished sixth. At the 2014 edition, the team had been competing with the new Haval H8 model, and finished in eighth. Since 2015, the company decided to quit Dakar Rally, but kept participating in other domestic rally races.

=== GT3 ===
At Auto China 2026, Great Wall announced its plans to produce a V8-powered supercar under the name of "GF" (Great Faith). Former McLaren Automotive chief engineer, Adam Thomson, will oversee the development of the car, with the intention of becoming China's first-ever Group GT3 model. The 4.0-litre twin-turbo V8 platform is expected to compete against the Ferrari SF90 Stradale and the Toyota GR GT.

== Controversies ==
=== Accusations of copied designs ===
In 2003, Nissan claimed that Great Wall's SUV, the Great Wall Sing copied the Nissan Paladin, and considered filing a lawsuit against Great Wall.

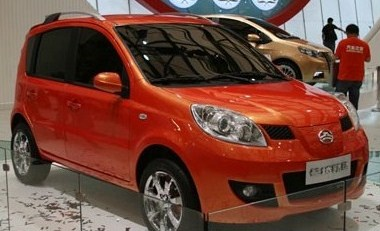
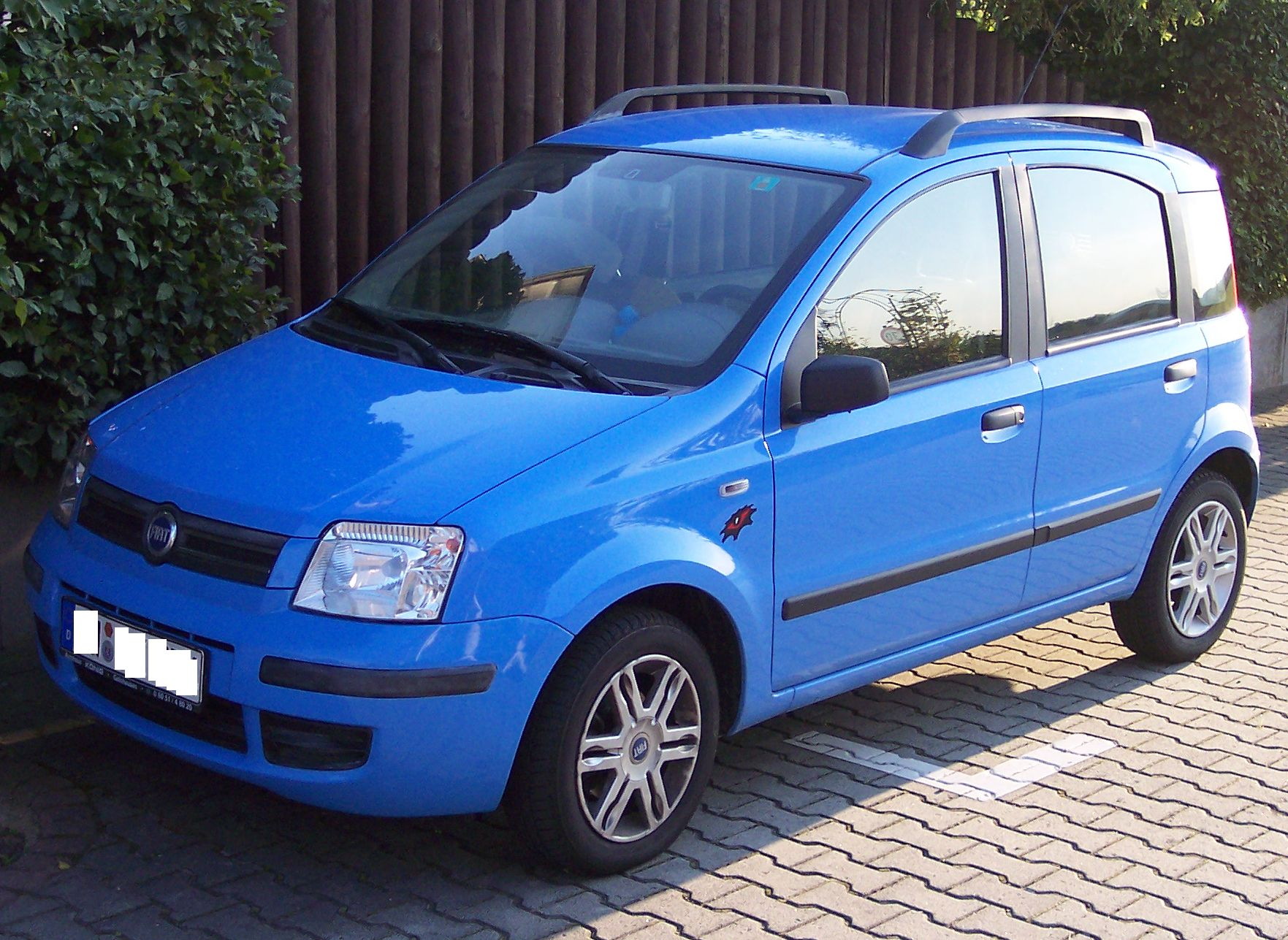
The Great Wall Peri (left) and Fiat Panda (right)

In 2006, Italian automaker Fiat claimed that a Great Wall A-segment car, the Peri (Jing Ling in China), was a copy of its popular second generation Fiat Panda. A 2008 Turin court ruling substantiated the claim, stating that the Peri "doesn't look like a different car but is a Panda with a different front end." A copyright infringement case in Shijiazhuang, China, however, was rejected, with the court claiming that "consumers would not be confused between the two" as they were "clearly different, particularly the front and rear parts of the vehicles".

Other Great Wall models were also inspired by products of foreign automakers. The Great Wall Florid looks like a Toyota ist, the Great Wall Sailor/SA220 resembles Nissan Frontier, the Great Wall Coolbear is essentially a copy of the first-generation Scion xB, and the original Great Wall Hover model looks like the Isuzu Axiom.

== See also ==
- Automobile manufacturers and brands of China
- List of automobile manufacturers of China
- Automotive industry in China
