= Link Tour K-One =

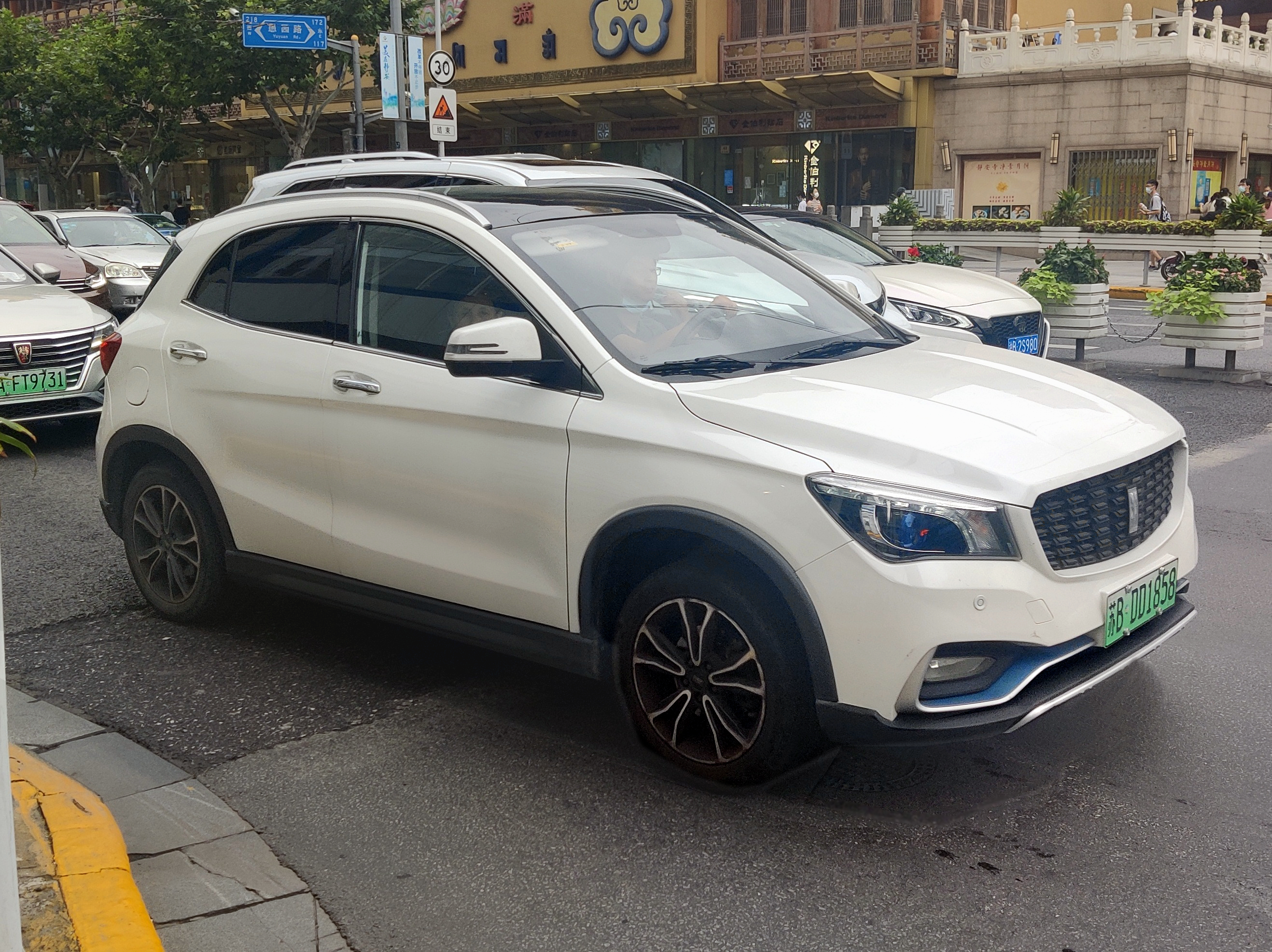
- Link Tour K-One in Shanghai

Overview
- Manufacturer: Link Tour
- Production: 2018–2019

Body and chassis
- Class: Subcompact car (B)
- Body style: 5-door hatchback
- Layout: Front-motor, front-wheel-drive

Powertrain
- Electric motor: Permanent magnet synchronous motor
- Power output: 45 kW (60 hp); 96 kW (129 hp)
- Battery: Lithium-ion; 40.55 kWh Lithium-Ternary: 310 Km; 46.2 kWh Lithium-Ternary: 405 Km
- Electric range: Up to 501 km (311 mi)

Dimensions
- Wheelbase: 2,520 mm (99.2 in)
- Length: 4,100 mm (161.4 in)
- Width: 1,710 mm (67.3 in)
- Height: 1,595 mm (62.8 in)
- Curb weight: 1,400kg - 1,775kg

The Link Tour K-One is a subcompact car crossover produced by Link Tour since October 2018. Link Tour is a brand introduced by Link Tour Holdings, the joint venture between Yogomo and Great Wall Motor. Link Tour plans to make two platforms covering two A0-segment models and three A00-segment models with the electric mileages ranging from 150 to 400 km (93 to 249 mi). Four out of the five vehicles would support battery swapping and one of the A0-segment model would carry three portable battery packs.

According to references less than 1600 cars were sold (2018 and 2019).

== Overview ==
The Link Tour K-One provides two variants of electric motor and battery packs based on different trim level configurations. The two electric motor options are able to generate maximum power of 45 and 96 kW (60 and 129 hp) respectively, with a corresponding peak torque of 170N·m and 230 N·m. The two ternary lithium battery pack options features a maximum capacity of 40.55 kW/h and 46.2 kW/h, allowing the vehicle to travel up to 310 and 405 km (193 and 252 mi) respectively under the NEDC (new European driving cycle). The top of the line Link Tour K-One 400 EV produces 96 kW (129 hp) and 230 N.m (170 lb.ft) torque with a top speed of 125 km/h (78 mph). Based on the NEDC driving cycle the energy consumption of the 2018 Link Tour Link Tour K-One 400 EV is 14.6 kWh/100 km.

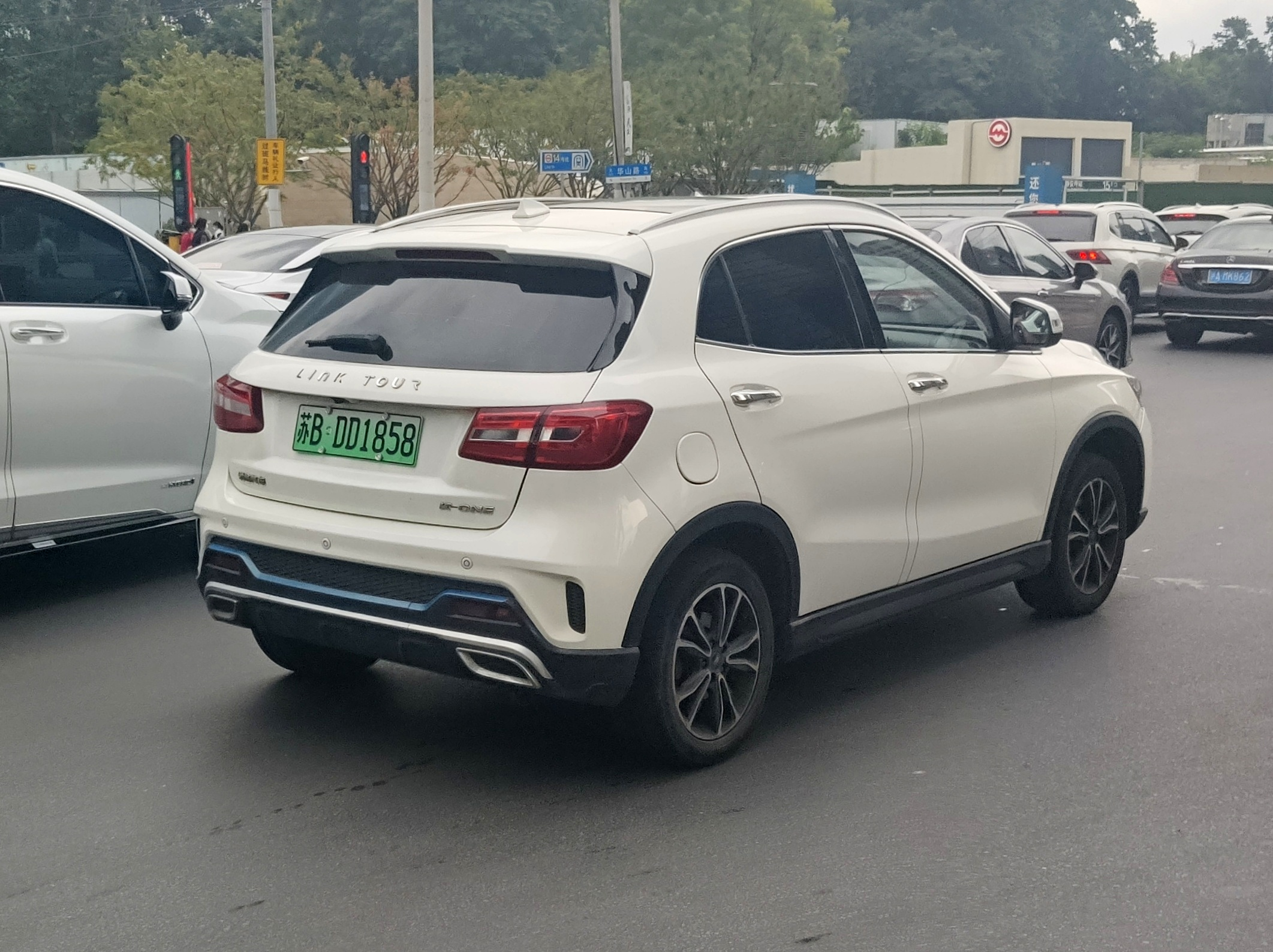
Link Tour K-One rear
