= Wei Jianjun =

Chinese businessman

Wei Jianjun 魏建军
- Born: 1964 (age 61–62); Baoding, Hebei, China
- Occupations: Chairman, Great Wall Motors

Wei Jianjun (Chinese: 魏建军; pinyin: Wèi Jiànjūn; born 1964) is a Chinese billionaire businessman who serves as chairman of Great Wall Motors, the largest Chinese SUV manufacturer.

== Early life ==
Wei Jianjun was born in Baoding, Hebei, China.

== Career ==
According to Forbes, Wei Jianjun has a net worth of US$12 billion, as of April 2024.

== Personal life ==
He is married and lives in Baoding, Hebei.
