= Ora Lightning Cat =

Battery electric mid-size sedan and station wagon

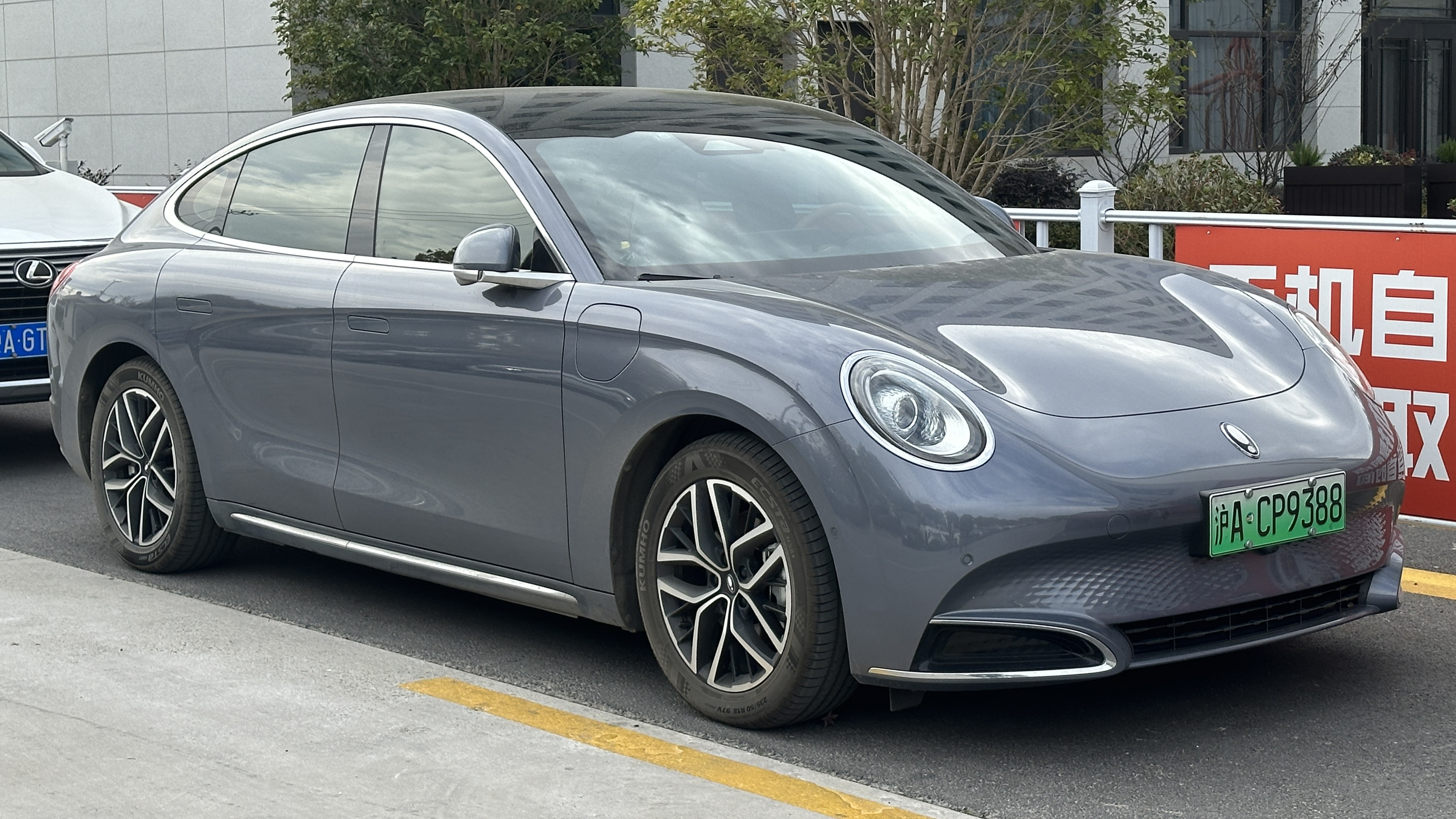

Overview
- Manufacturer: Great Wall Motor (Spotlight Automotive)
- Also called: Ora 7 (2026); GWM Ora 07 (export)
- Production: 2022–present
- Assembly: China: Taizhou, Zhejiang

Body and chassis
- Class: Mid-size car (D)
- Body style: 4-door sedan; 5-door station wagon
- Layout: Front-motor, front-wheel-drive (FF); Dual-motor, all-wheel-drive (AWD)
- Platform: GWM Lemon E Platform

Powertrain
- Electric motor: 2x permanent magnet synchronous motor
- Power output: 150–160 kW (204–218 PS; 201–215 bhp) (FF); 300–310 kW (408–421 PS; 402–416 bhp) (AWD)
- Battery: 58.3 kWh SVOLT LFP; 68.9 kWh SVOLT LFP; 83.5 kWh ternary lithium-ion (NMC) (Long range)
- Electric range: Up to 640 km (398 mi) (NEDC)

Dimensions
- Wheelbase: 2,870 mm (113.0 in)
- Length: 4,871 mm (191.8 in)
- Width: 1,862 mm (73.3 in)
- Height: 1,500 mm (59.1 in)
- Curb weight: 2,183 kg (4,813 lb)

The Ora Lightning Cat (Chinese: 欧拉闪电猫; pinyin: Ōulā Shǎndiàn Māo) is a battery electric mid-size sedan and station wagon produced by Chinese EV manufacturer Ora, a marque of Great Wall Motor since 2022. It is marketed overseas since 2023 as the GWM Ora 07.

== Overview ==
The Lightning Cat was first revealed as a concept at Auto Shanghai on April 21, 2021, in Shanghai, China, alongside the Ora Punk Cat. A different Lightning Cat was shown later in September at the 2021 International Motor Show Germany in Munich, wearing the "03 Cat" name. It previews the brand's entry into the European market and was shown alongside the 01 Cat and 02 Cat, both rebadged from the Good Cat. In 2022, the vehicle was showcased at the Thailand International Motor Expo bearing the Grand Cat name. The Lightning Cat was launched in Singapore as the Ora 07 on January 9, 2025.

Styling of the Lightning Cat is controversial as it heavily resembles some Porsche models such as the 911 and Panamera.

The station wagon model marketed as the Ora Lightning Cat Touring was unveiled in April 2025 at the Shanghai Auto Show.

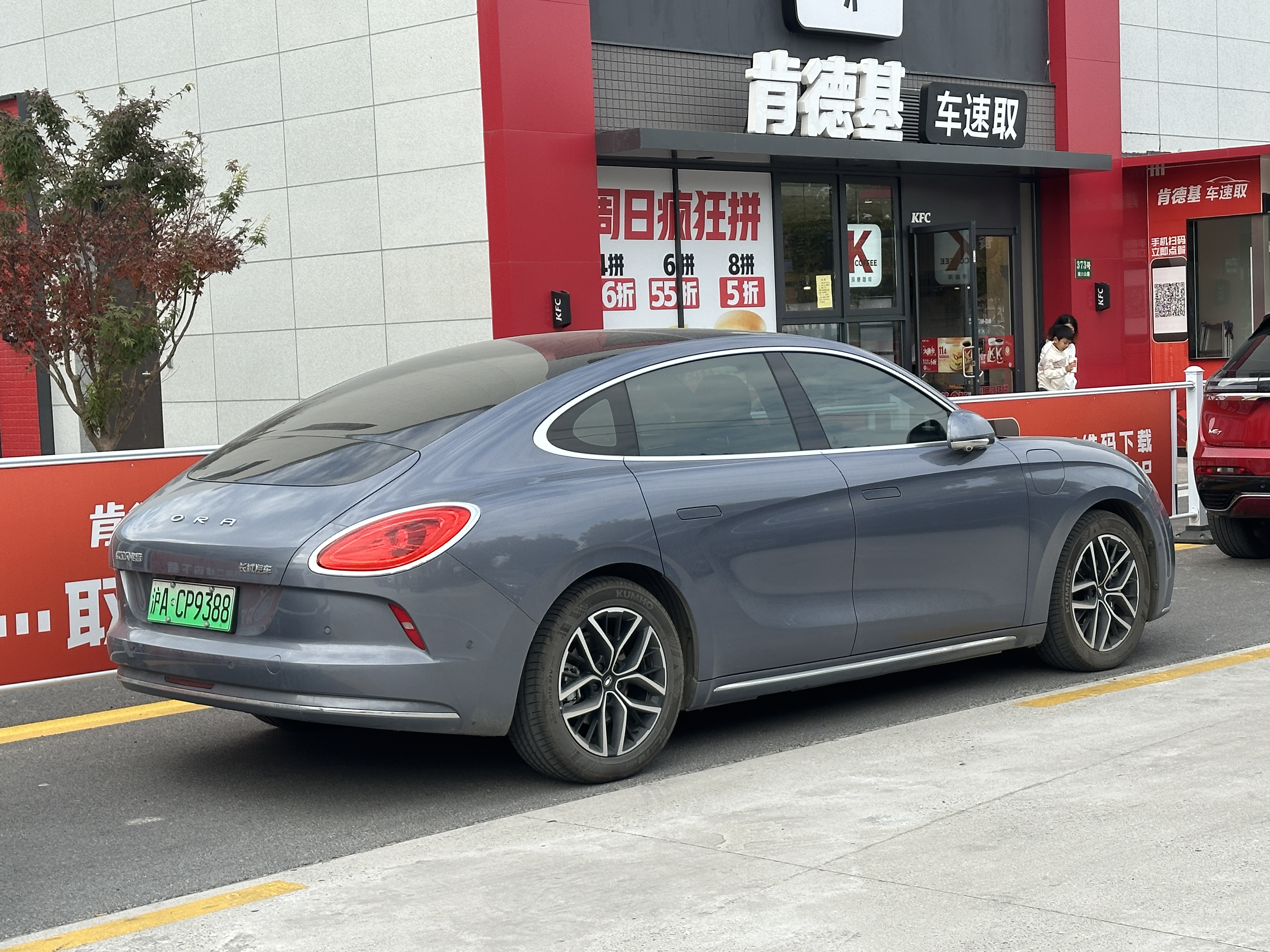
Rear view

Interior

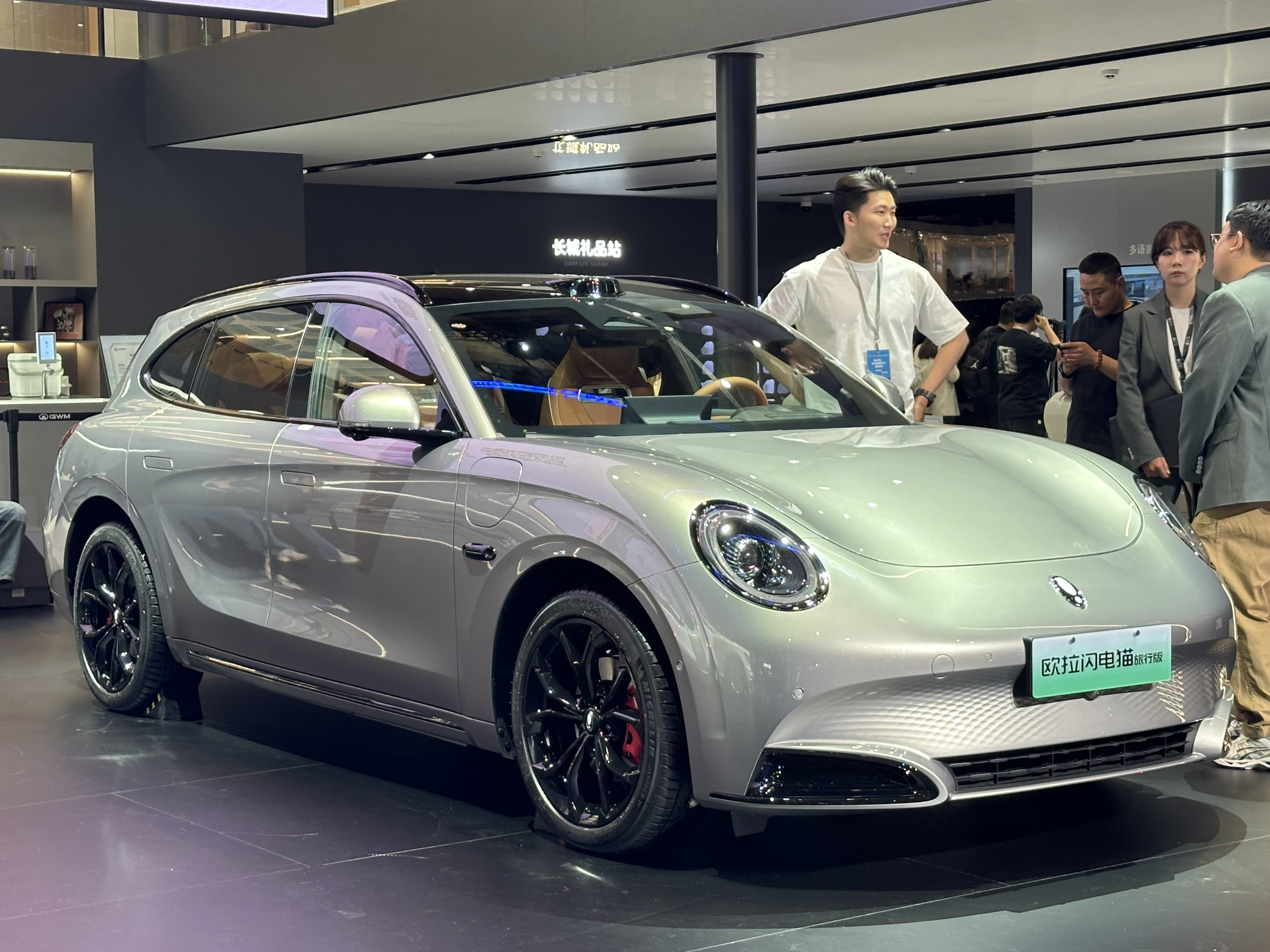
Ora Lightning Cat Touring

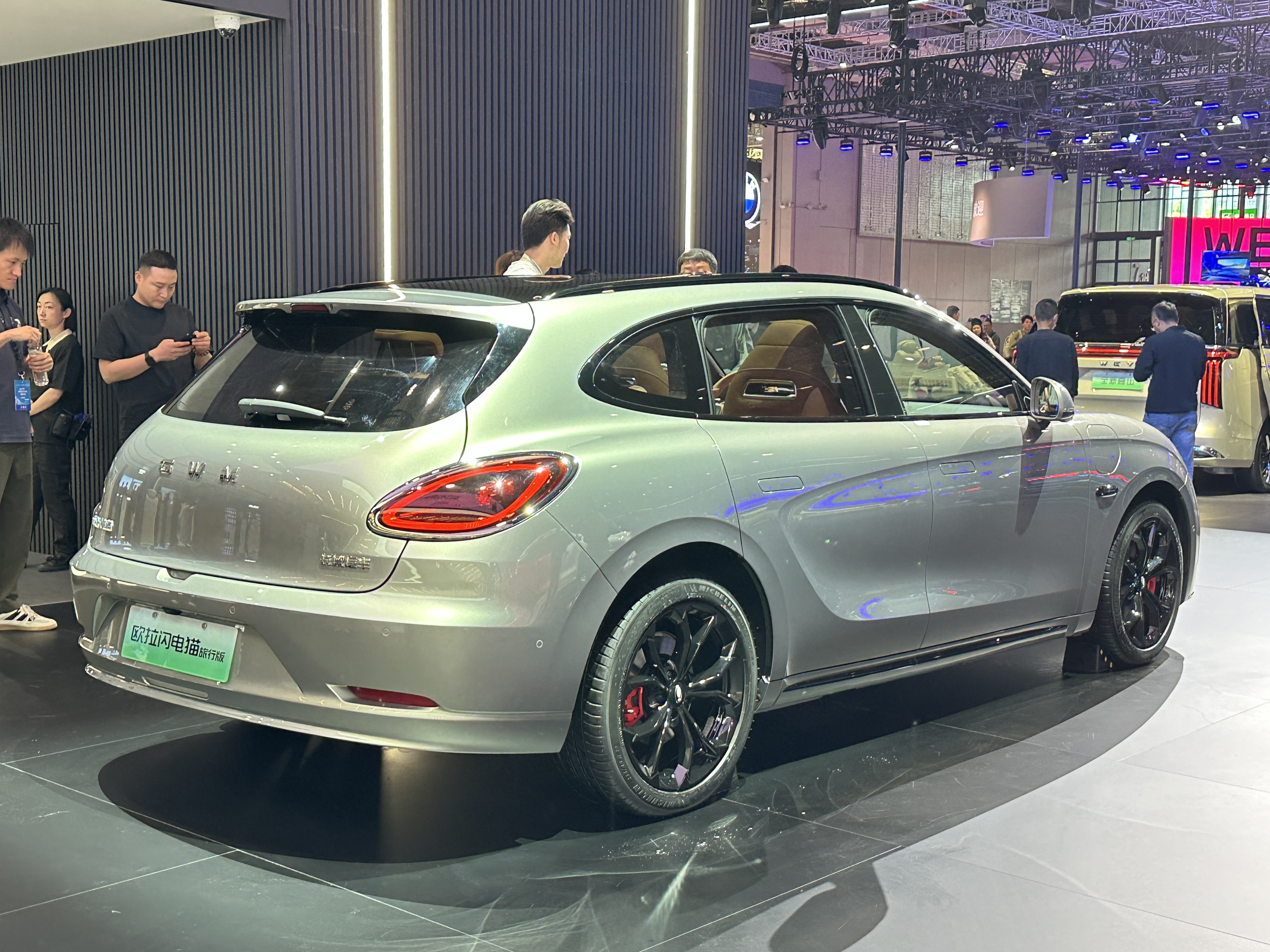
Rear view

== Specifications ==
=== Battery ===
The Lightning Cat uses an 83.5-kilowatt-hour (301 MJ) battery pack, which has a max output of 300 kW (402 hp; 408 PS) and 680 N⋅m (69.3 kg⋅m; 502 lb⋅ft) of torque. It has a top speed of 180 km/h (112 mph) and a 0–100 km/h (0–62 mph) acceleration time of 4.3 seconds. The car has a New European Driving Cycle (NEDC) range of up to 640 kilometres (398 mi).

=== Features ===
The Lightning Cat comes with Level 3 autonomous driving, allowing the car to be steered, braked, accelerated, and parked unmanned. Also featured is an AI-based cabin support system that monitors the temperature and pulse rate of the car's occupants to adjust the cabin comfort.

== Sales ==
Year	China
2023	10,321
2024	3,522
2025	483
