= Ora 5 =

Chinese car

Overview
- Manufacturer: Great Wall Motor
- Also called: GWM Ora 5 (export); GWM Ora 5 Plus (station wagon; Thailand)
- Production: 2025–present
- Assembly: China: Taizhou, Zhejiang; Thailand: Rayong (GWM Thailand)
- Designer: Andrew Dyson

Body and chassis
- Class: Compact car (C); Mid-size car (D); Compact crossover SUV (C)
- Body style: 5-door hatchback; 4-door sedan; 5-door station wagon; 5-door SUV
- Layout: Front-engine, front-wheel-drive (ICE & HEV); Front-motor, front-wheel-drive (EV)
- Platform: Guiyuan Platform (GWM ONE)

Powertrain
- Engine: Petrol: 1.5 L GW4B15 I4 turbo; Petrol hybrid: 1.5 L GW4B15 GDIT EVO I4 turbo; Petrol plug-in hybrid: 1.5 L GW4B15 GDIT EVO I4 turbo
- Electric motor: 174 bhp; 177 PS (130 kW) DHT130 BorgWarner permanent magnet synchronous motor
- Power output: 158–181 bhp; 160–184 PS (118–135 kW) (ICE); 220 bhp; 223 PS (164 kW) (HEV); 201 bhp; 204 PS (150 kW) (EV)
- Transmission: 7-speed DCT (ICE); Multi-mode DHT (HEV); Single speed (EV)
- Battery: HEV: 1.09 kWh SVOLT Li-ion; EV: 45.3 kWh SVOLT LFP; 58.3 kWh SVOLT LFP
- Electric range: 480–580 km (298–360 mi) (CLTC); 520 km (323 mi) (NEDC)

Dimensions
- Wheelbase: 2,720 mm (107.1 in)
- Length: 4,471 mm (176.0 in); 4,482 mm (176.5 in) (Sport); 4,500 mm (177.2 in) (GT); 4,758 mm (187.3 in) (sedan & touring)
- Width: 1,833 mm (72.2 in)
- Height: 1,559 mm (61.4 in) (hatchback); 1,641 mm (64.6 in) (SUV)
- Curb weight: 1,438–1,560 kg (3,170–3,439 lb)

Chronology
- Predecessor: Ora iQ; Ora Good Cat

The Ora 5 (Chinese: 欧拉5; pinyin: Ōulā 5) is a car produced by Great Wall Motor under its electric car marque Ora since 2025.

== Overview ==
The Ora 5 was revealed on 25 September 2025. It has been sold on the Chinese market since 16 December 2025.

Rear view

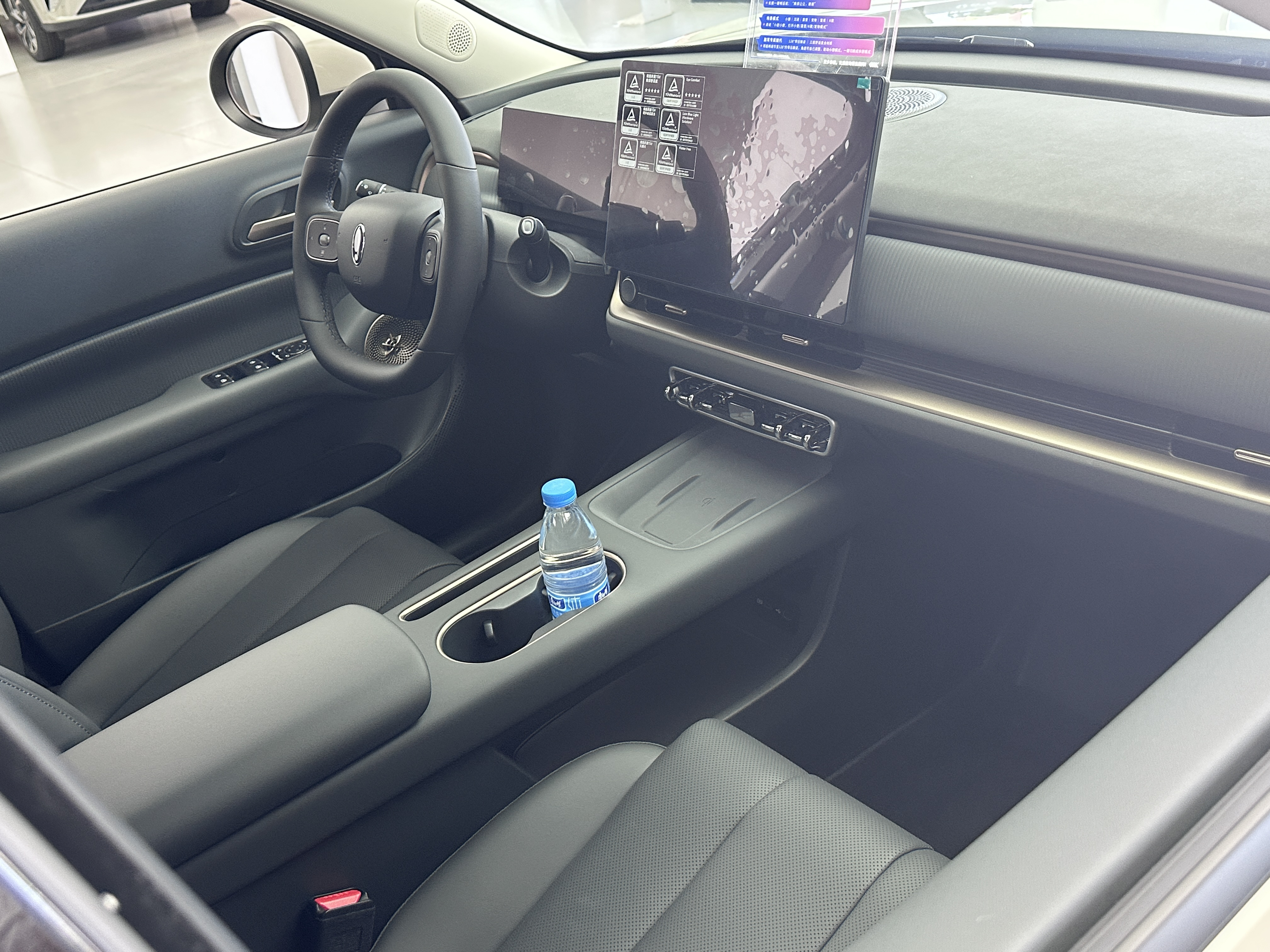
Interior

== Specifications ==
The Ora 5 adopts design elements from the Ora Good Cat, adapted to an crossover SUV silhouette. The 201 hp (150 kW; 204 PS) electric motor drives the front axle. The top speed is 170 km/h (106 mph). The electric motor is paired with a lithium iron phosphate battery with a capacity of either 45.3 or 58.3 kWh. According to the Chinese CLTC test cycle, a range of 480 or 580 km (298 or 360 mi) is achieved.

The cockpit display measures 10.25 inches, while the dashboard features a 15.6-inch touchscreen with 2.5K resolution for operating the infotainment system.

== Markets ==
=== Argentina ===
The Ora 5 was launched in Argentina on 25 August 2026, in the sole HEV variant using the 1.5-litre turbocharged petrol hybrid.

=== Australia ===
The Ora 5 went on sale in Australia on 10 April 2026, with customer deliveries commenced in June 2026. For the Australian market, the Ora 5 is available as the battery electric model with two trim levels: Lux and Ultra, both trims use the 58.3 kWh battery pack.

=== Brazil ===
The Ora 5 was launched in Brazil on 24 June 2026, in the sole Electric version using the 58.3 kWh battery pack.

=== Brunei ===
The Ora 5 was launched in Brunei on 29 July 2026 and it is available in the sole ICE variant of 1.5-litre turbocharged petrol engine mated with 7-speed dual-clutch automatic. The HEV variant with the 1.5-litre turbocharged petrol hybrid engine was launched in 8 October 2026.

=== Mexico ===
The Ora 5 was launched in Mexico on 22 June 2026. It is available with three variants: the Gasoline variant using the 1.5-litre turbocharged petrol, the Hybrid variant using the 1.5-litre turbocharged petrol hybrid, and Electric variant using the 58.3 kWh battery pack.

=== Singapore ===
The Ora 5 was launched in Singapore on 19 June 2026, by Cycle & Carriage, the distributor of Great Wall Motor Ora vehicles in the country. It is available in the sole Electric variant using the 58.3 kWh battery pack.

=== South Africa ===
The Ora 5 was launched in South Africa on 8 July 2026, with two trim levels: Super Luxury and Ultra Luxury. The Super Luxury and Ultra Luxury trims are available with three powertrain options: the 1.5-litre turbocharged petrol, the 1.5-litre turbocharged petrol hybrid, and the battery electric version using the 58.3 kWh battery pack.

=== Thailand ===
The Ora 5 was launched in Thailand on 23 March 2026, with two trim levels: Pro and Ultra. In Thailand, the Pro and Ultra trims is available as a hybrid version using the 1.5-litre turbocharged petrol hybrid and a battery electric version using the 58.3 kWh battery pack.

The Ora 5 Plus was launched in Thailand on 10 November 2026, sale start in 1 December 2026. It is available in the sole variant: Ultra. In Thailand, the Ultra trim is available as a hybrid version using the 1.5-litre turbocharged petrol hybrid and a battery electric version using the 58.3 kWh battery pack.

=== Uruguay ===
The Ora 5 was launched in Uruguay on 7 July 2026, in the sole electric version using the 58.3 kWh battery pack.

== Safety ==
ANCAP test results GWM Ora 5 (2026, aligned with Euro NCAP)
| Test | Score |
|---|---|
| Overall: | 5 /5 stars |
| Safe driving | 70% |
| Crash avoidance | 71% |
| Crash protection | 91% |
| Post crash | 92% |

== Sales ==
| Year | China |
|---|---|
| 2025 | 1,638 |
