= Ora (marque) =

Chinese car marque

- Product type: Automobile
- Current owner: Great Wall Motor
- Country: China
- Introduced: 2018; 8 years ago
- Ambassador: Lu Wenpu (Ora brand CEO)
- Website: oraev.com (China)

Chinese name
- Simplified Chinese: 欧拉
- Hanyu Pinyin: Oūlā

Ora (Chinese: 欧拉; pinyin: Oūlā; stylised in all caps) is a marque of battery electric cars established in 2018 by Chinese automaker Great Wall Motor (GWM).

According to GWM, Ora stands for "open, reliable and alternative", while also paying homage to Leonhard Euler, a notable Swiss mathematician whose surname is phonetically translated as "Oula" in Mandarin Chinese.

== History ==
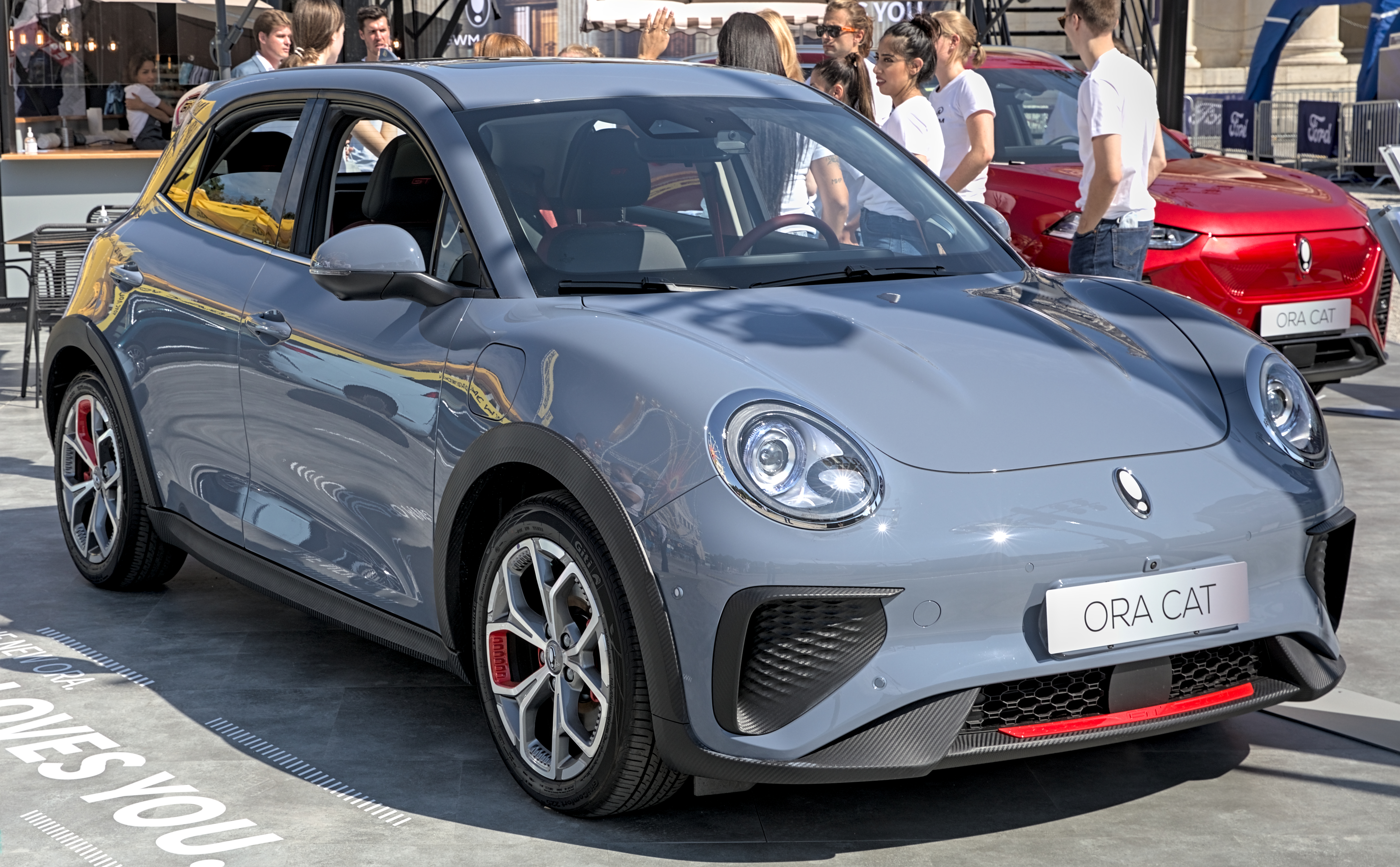
Ora Cat GT at IAA 2021

Great Wall Motors announced the creation of the new Ora brand, dedicated to a new line of electric cars, in May 2018. At the time, the brand was launched with two initial models: the crossover iQ5 (later iQ) and city car R1 (later Black Cat). Sales of the iQ officially kicked off the brand in August 2018. The third Ora model R2 (later White Cat) was first previewed in June 2019, with production officially beginning in July 2020.

The Ora brand entered Europe, Thailand, Malaysia, South Africa and Australia in late 2022, Brazil in 2023, and Brunei on 8 December 2023. Ora was unveiled at Indonesia International Auto Show 2023 and is planned to be marketed in Indonesia in 2024.

The naming of the "Cat" series vehicles is reportedly based on a Deng Xiaoping's famous quote: "No matter if it is a white cat or a black cat; as long as it can catch mice, it is a good cat."

=== Leadership ===
- Ning Shuyong (2018–2022)
- Dong Yudong (2022)
- Wen Fei (2022–2023)
- Zhao Yongpo (2023–2025)
- Lu Wenbin (2025–present)

== Vehicles ==
=== Current ===
- Ora Good Cat/Funky Cat/03 (2020–present), compact hatchback, BEV
- Ora Ballet Cat (2022–present), mid-size hatchback, BEV
- Ora Lightning Cat/07 (2022–present), mid-size fastback sedan BEV
  - Ora Lightning Cat Touring (to commence), mid-size station wagon, BEV
- Ora 5 (2025–present), compact SUV/hatchback/station wagon/sedan, ICE/HEV/PHEV/BEV
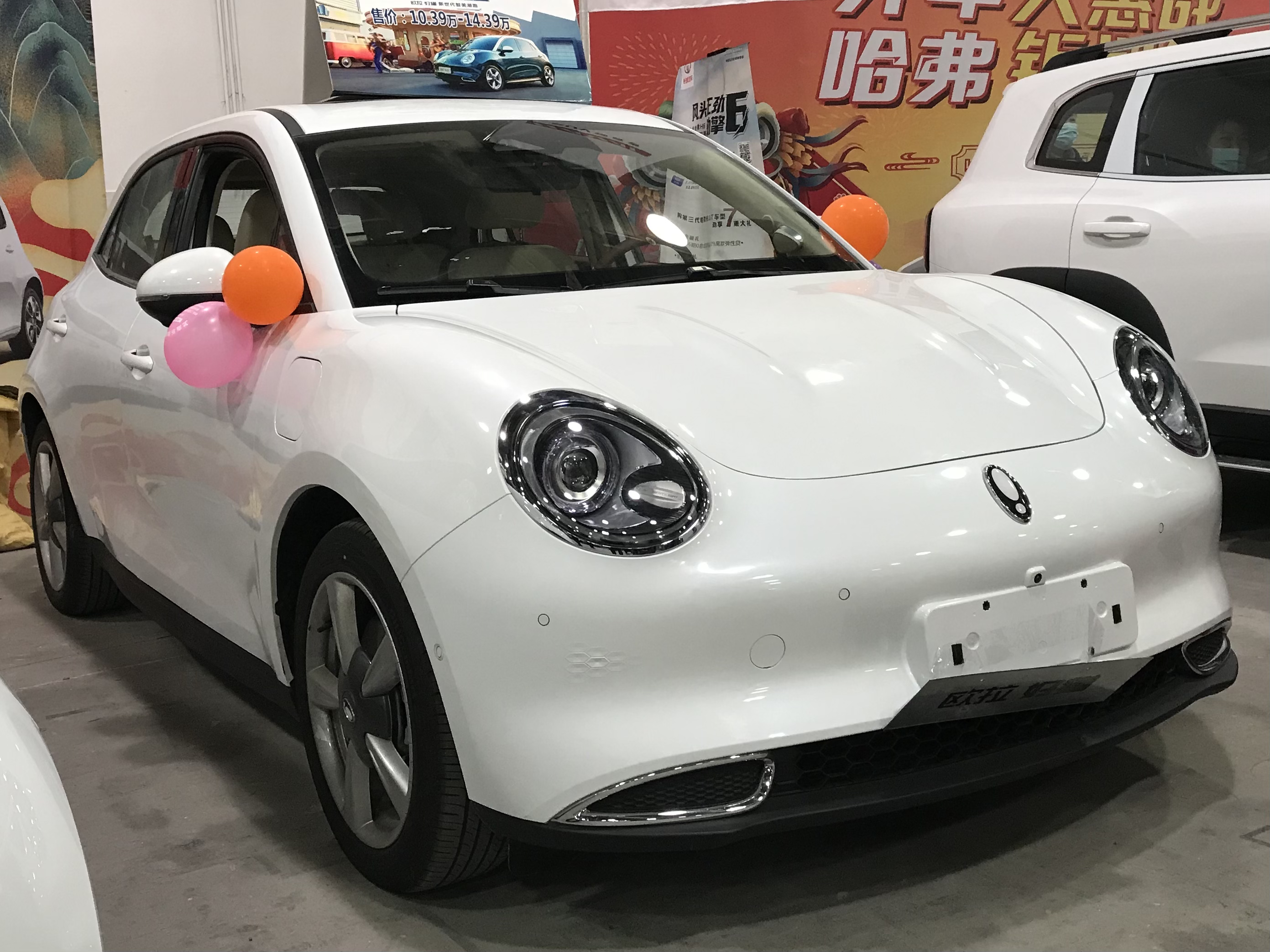
Ora Haomao / 03 / Good Cat / Funky Cat

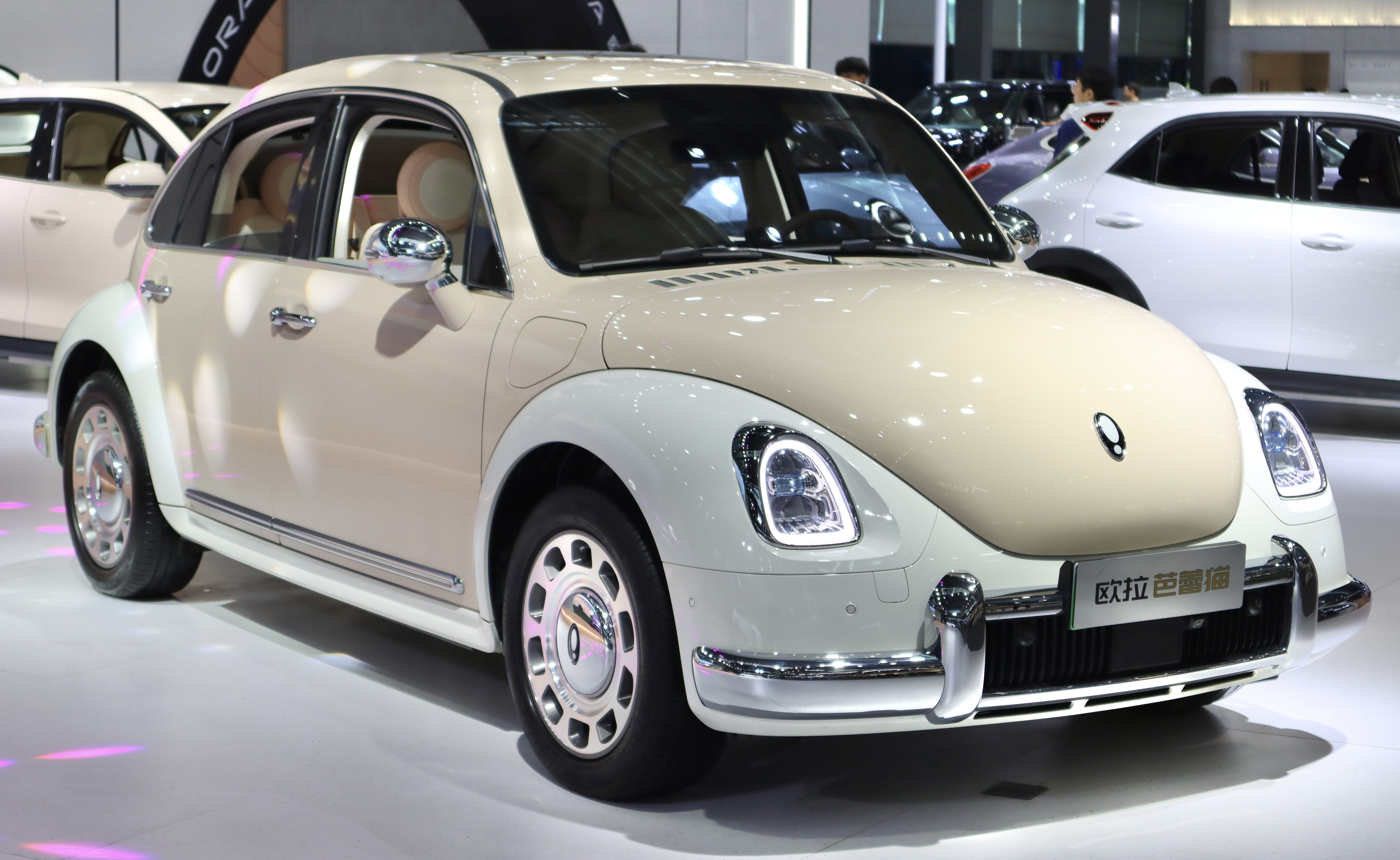
Ora Ballet Cat

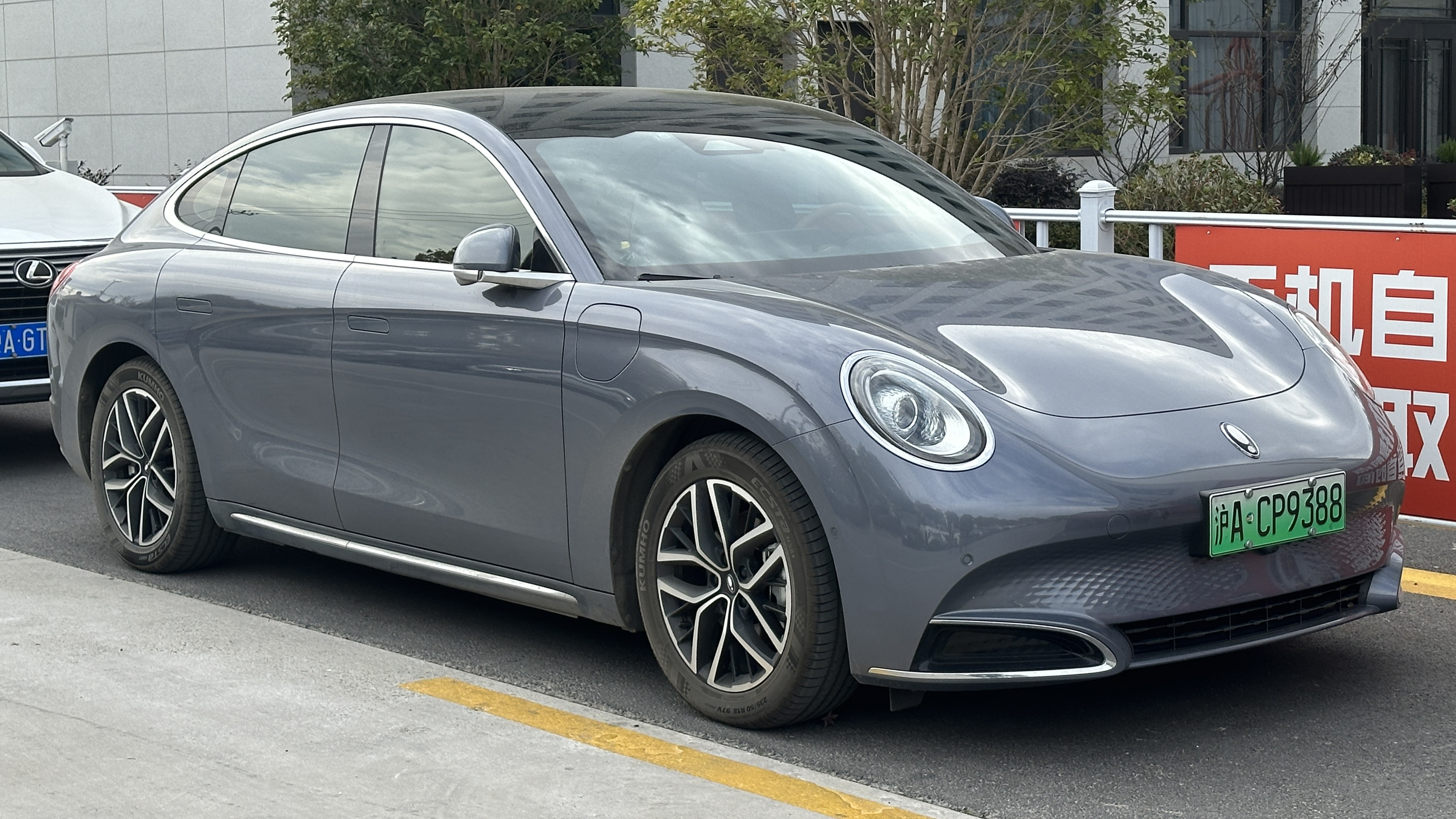
Ora Lightning Cat

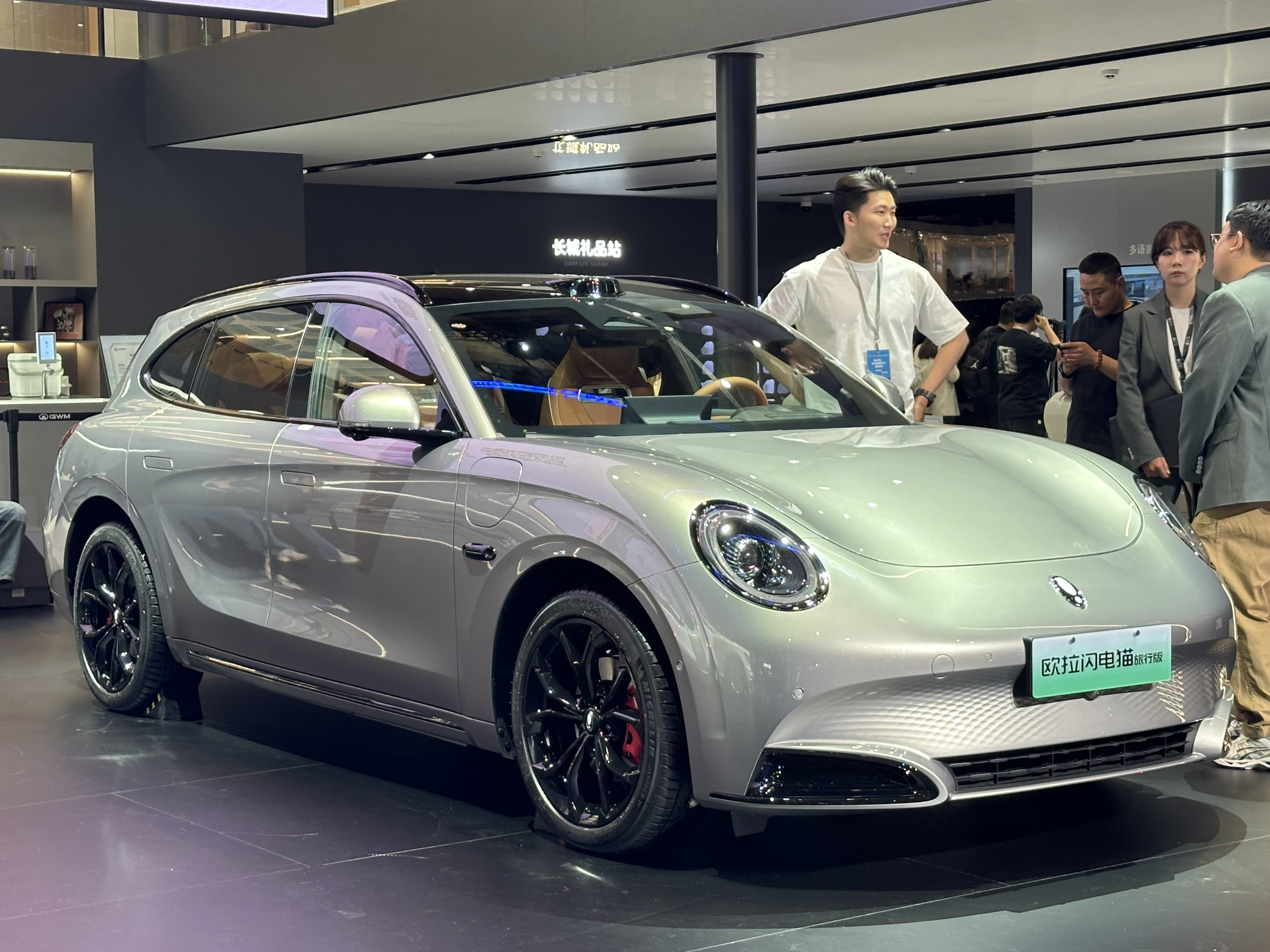
Ora Lightning Cat Touring

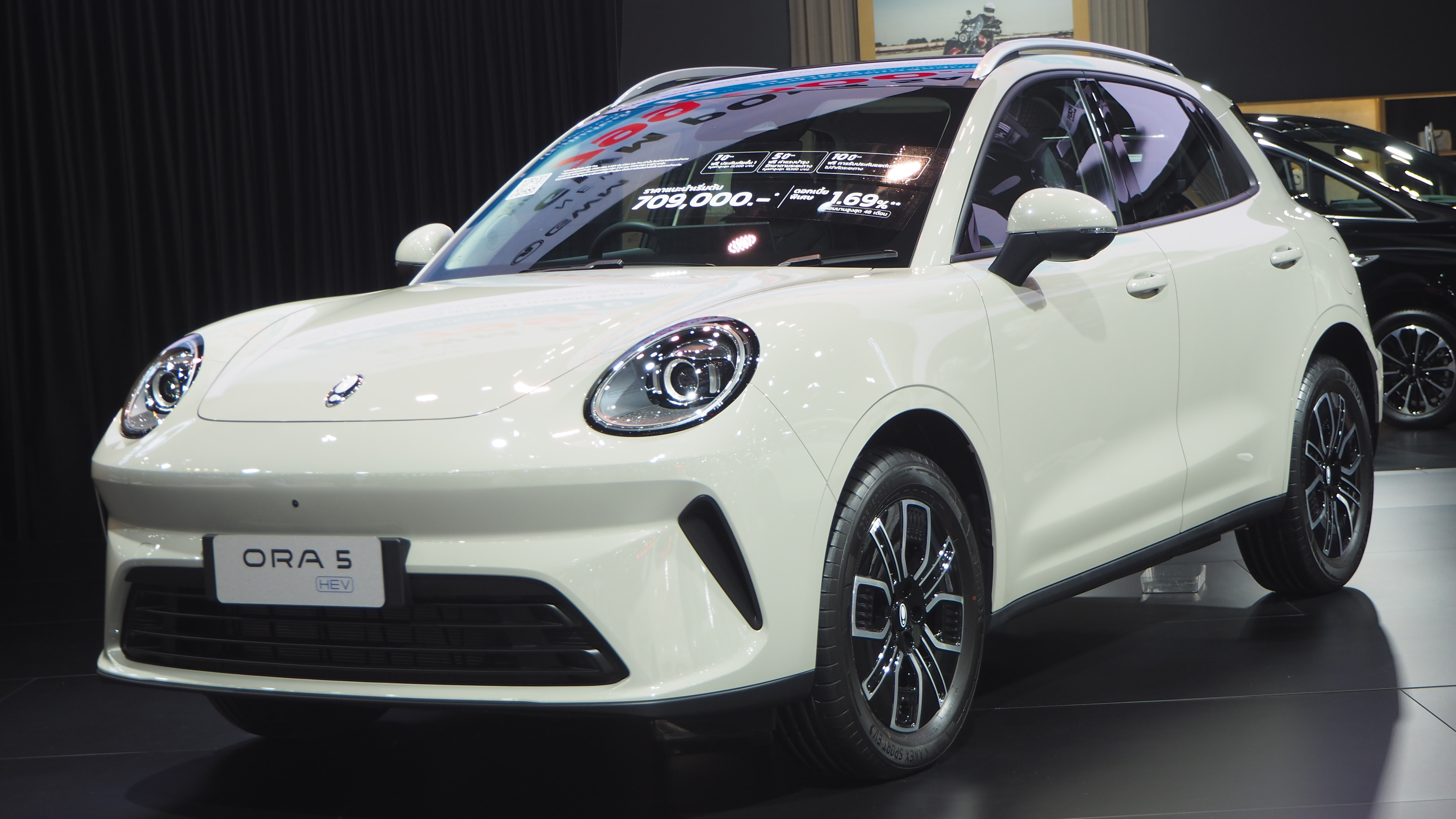
Ora 5

=== Discontinued ===
- Ora iQ (2018–2020), compact coupe SUV, BEV
- Ora R1/Black Cat (2019–2022), city car, BEV
- Ora R2/White Cat (2020–2022), city car, BEV
- Mecha Dragon (2022–2024), full-size sedan, BEV
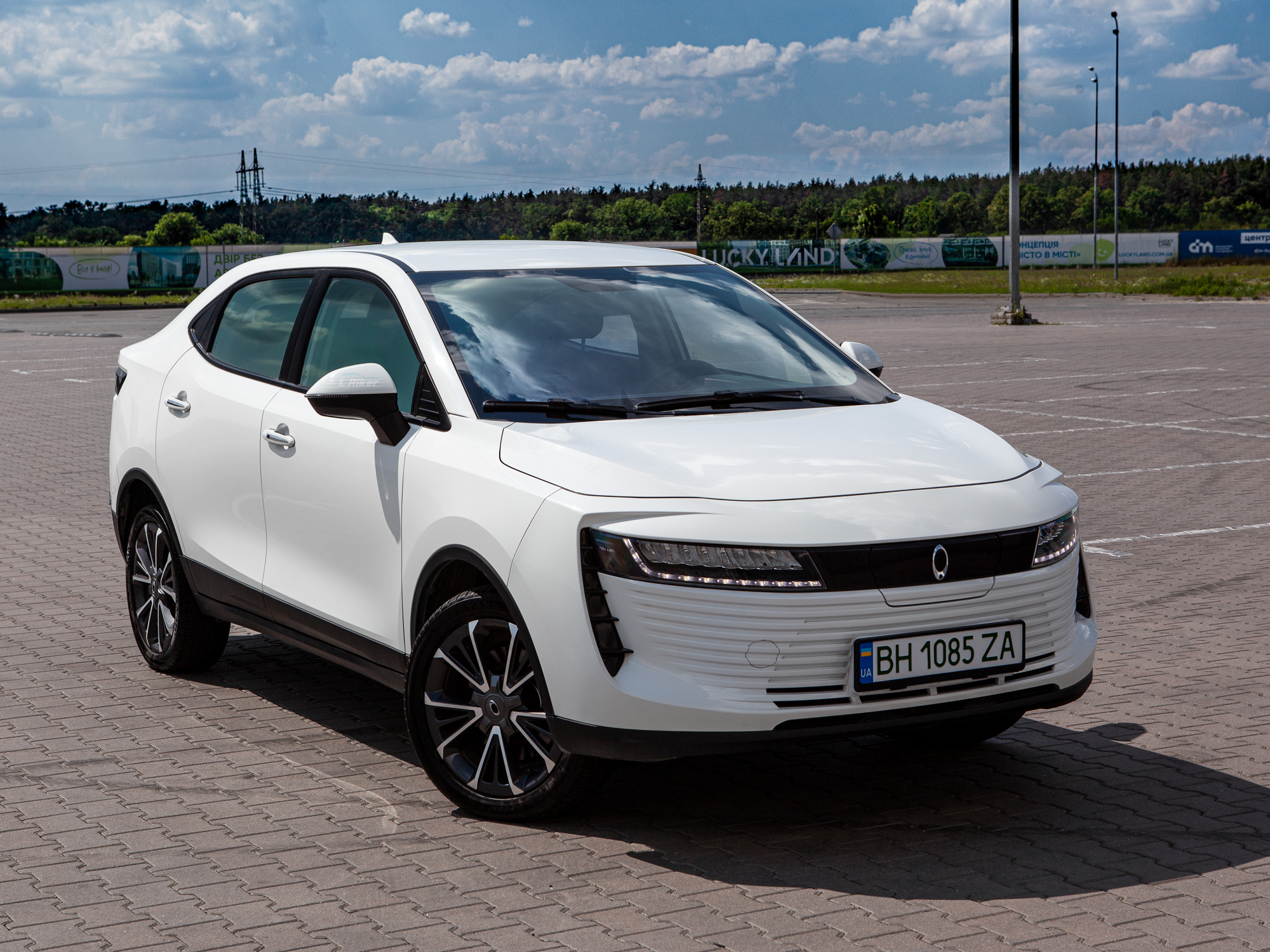
Ora iQ

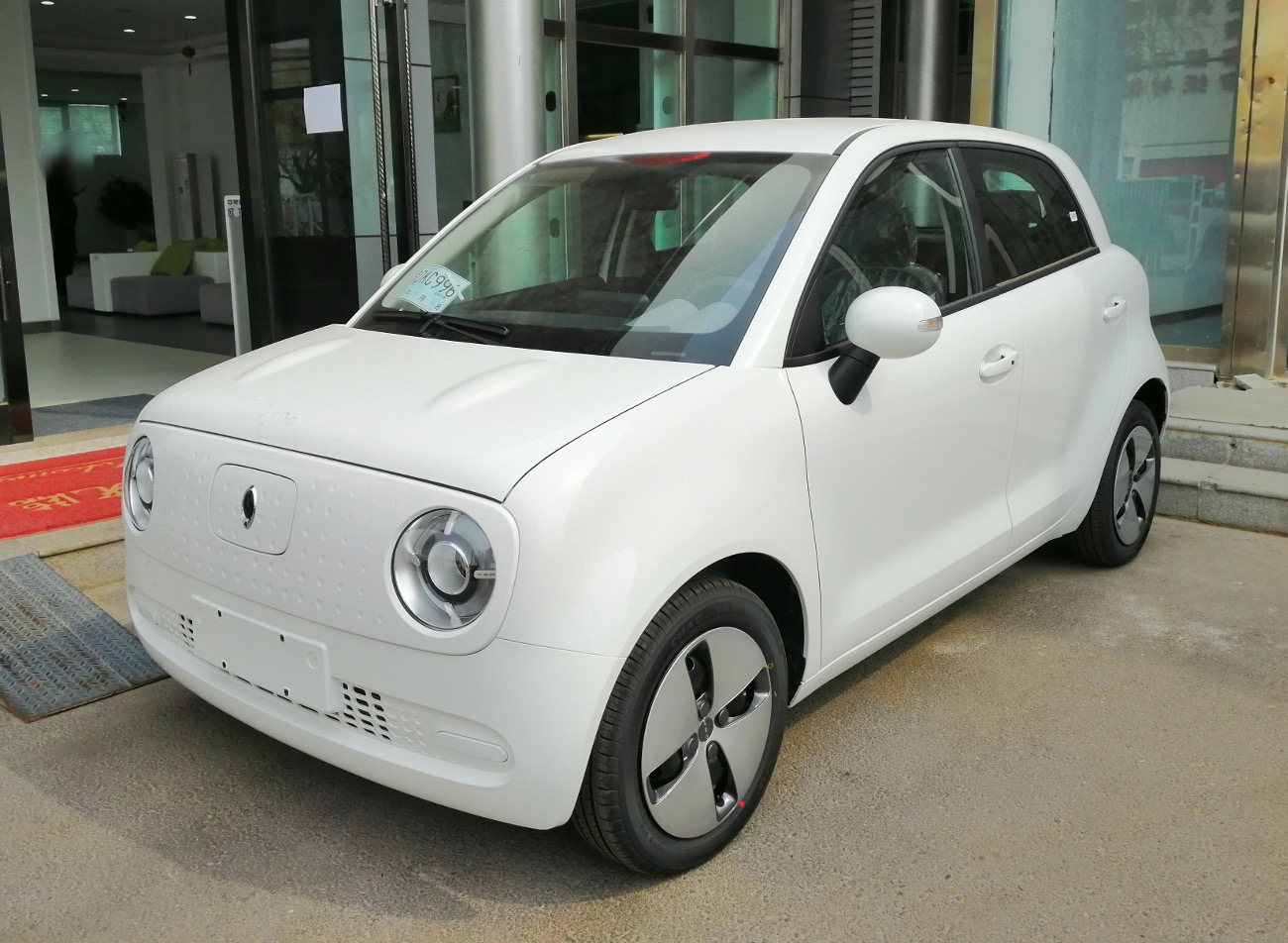
Ora Black Cat

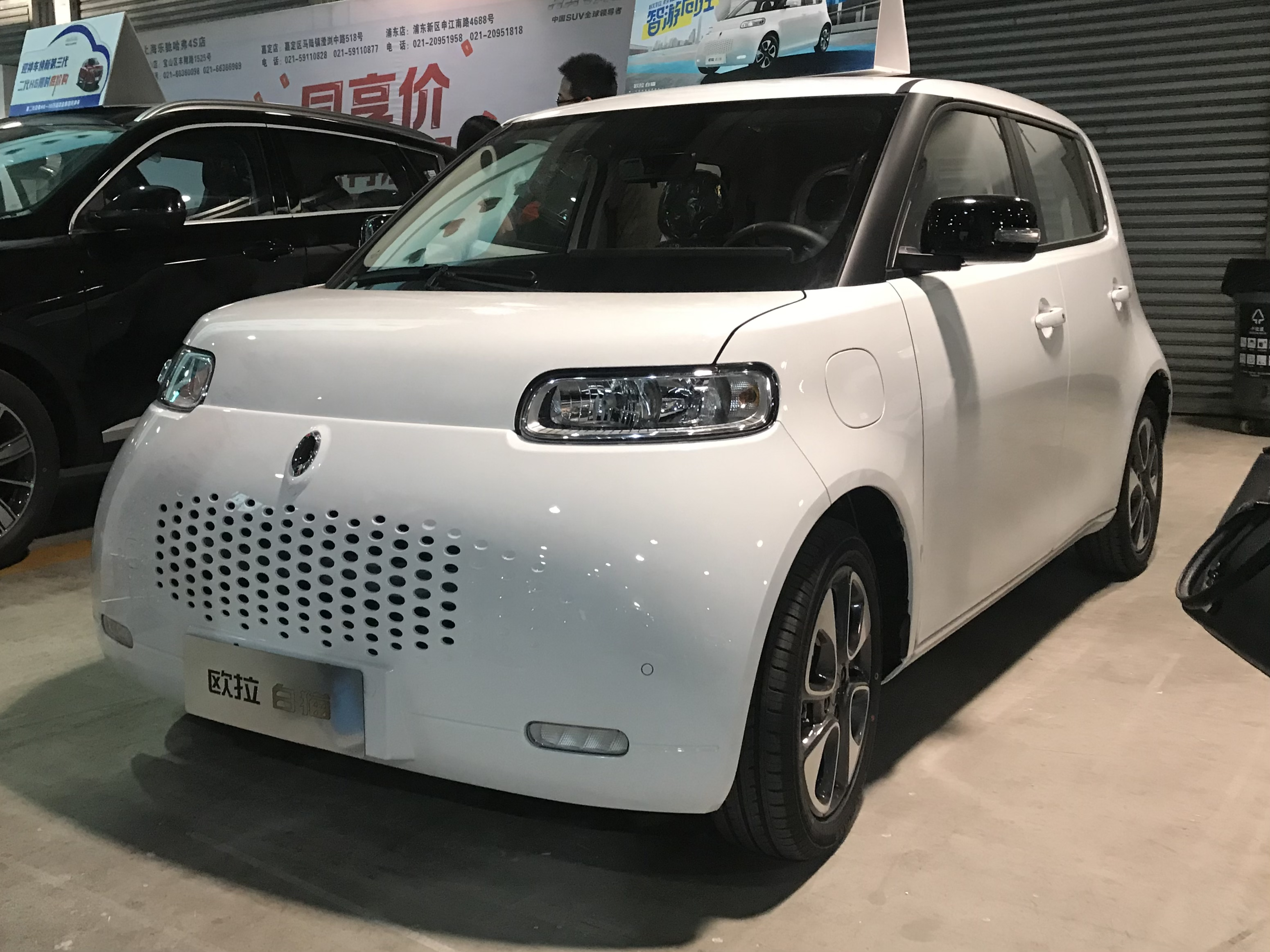
Ora White Cat

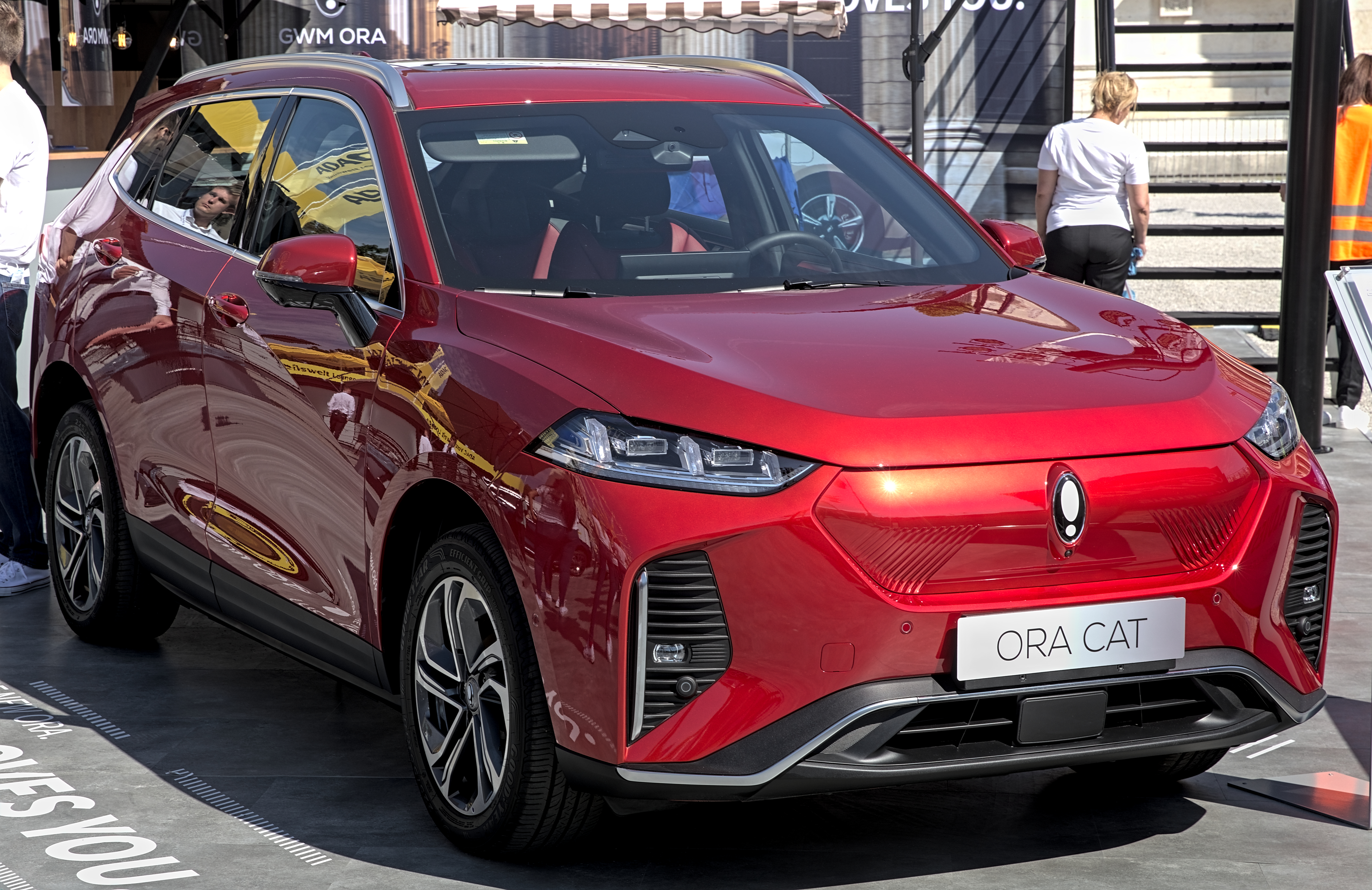
Ora Cherry Cat

=== Concept ===
- Ora R2 Concept
- Ora Futurist
- Ora Punk Cat
- Ora Lightning Cat
- Ora Big Cat
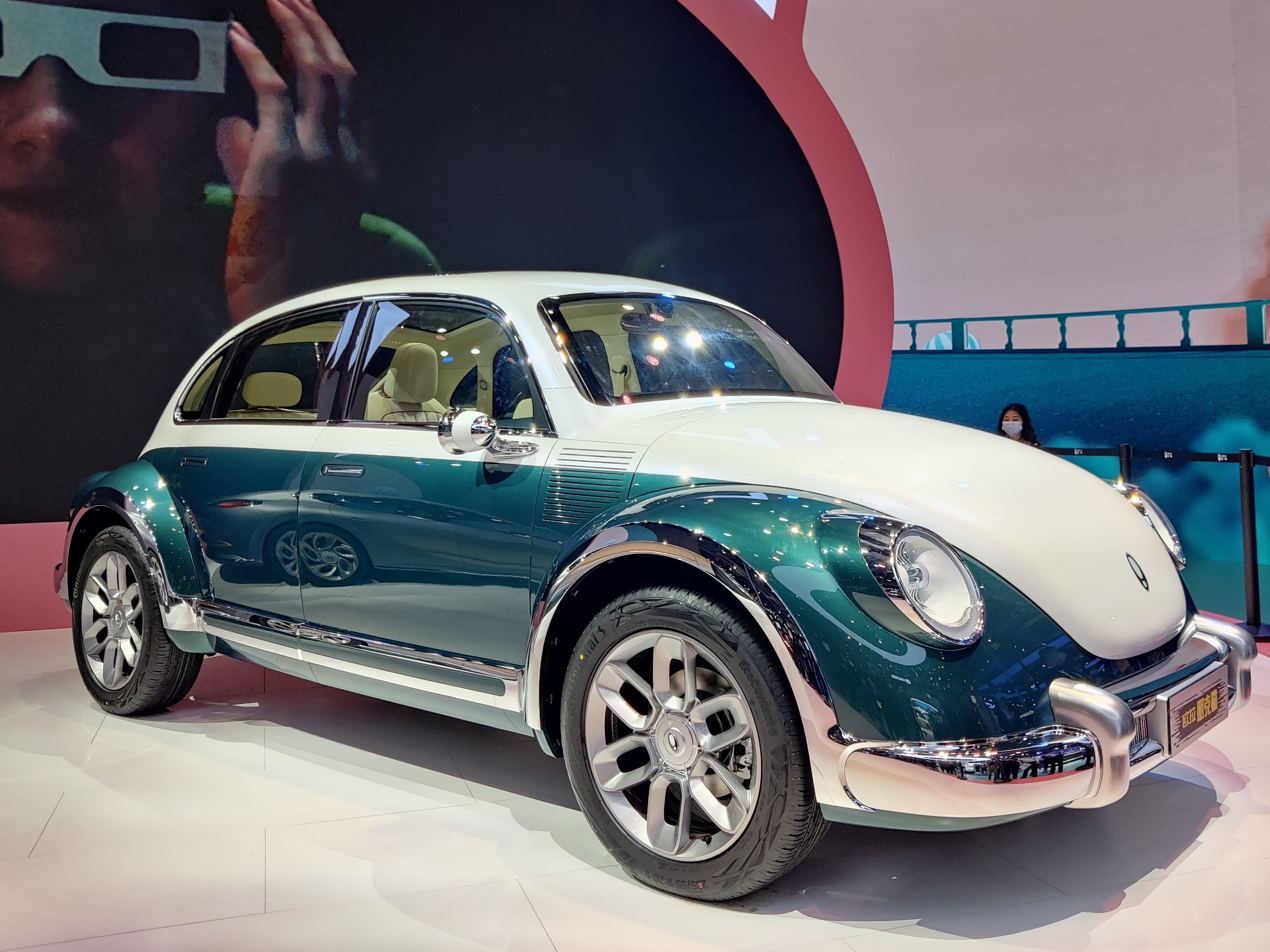
Ora Punk Cat

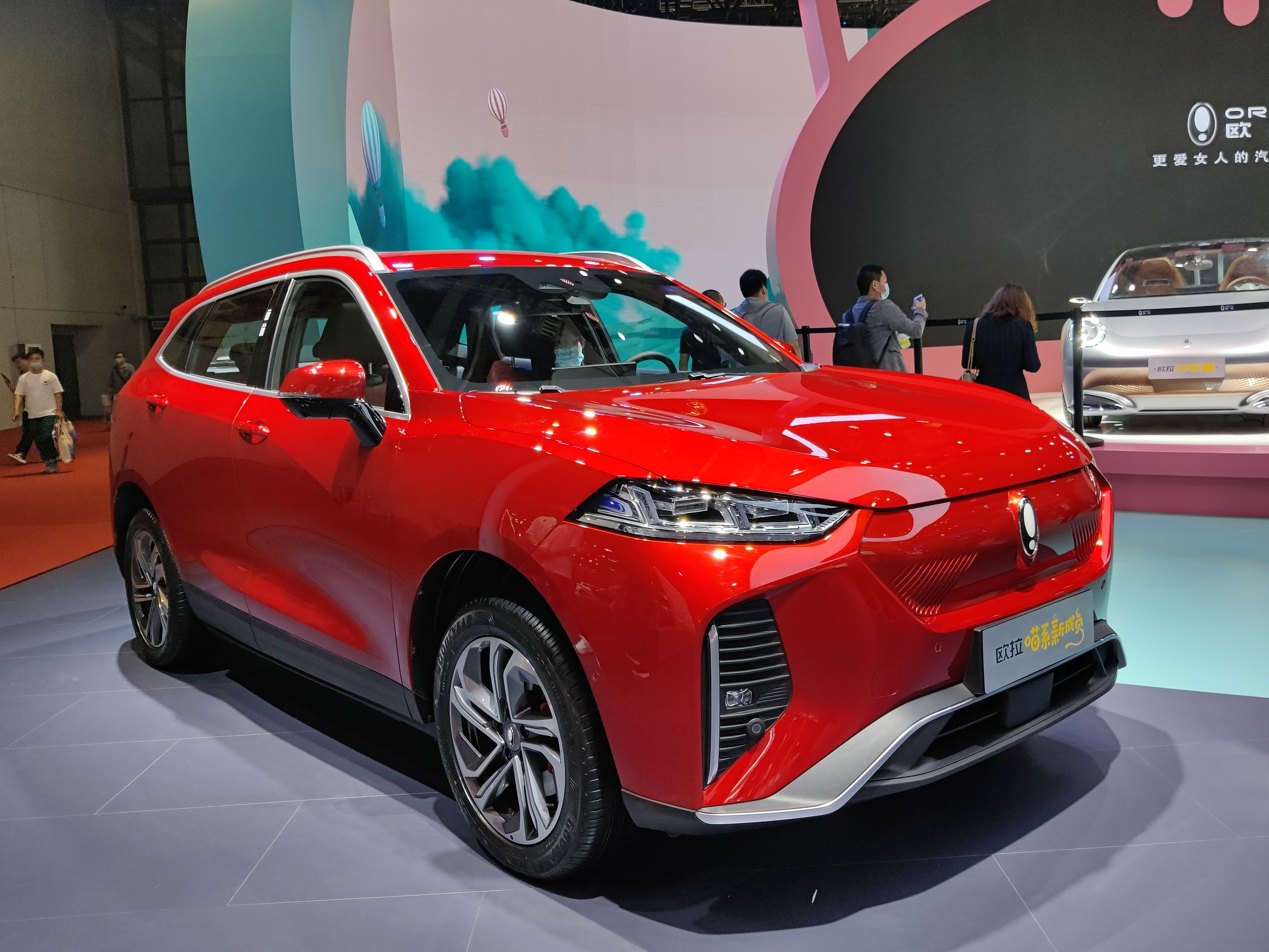
Ora Big Cat

== See also ==
- Automobile manufacturers and brands of China
- List of automobile manufacturers of China
