= Mecha Dragon =

Chinese full-size luxury electric sedan

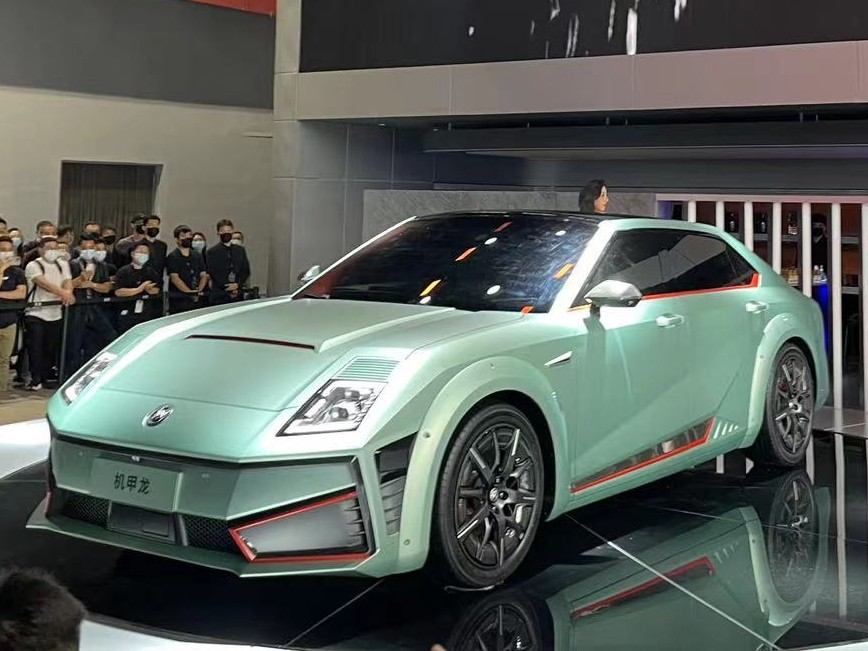

Overview
- Manufacturer: Great Wall Motor
- Also called: Sar Mecha Dragon; Shalong Jijialong
- Production: 2022–2024 (101 units)
- Model years: 2023–2024
- Designer: Huang Yuan-Wei

Body and chassis
- Class: Full-size luxury car (F)
- Body style: 4-door sedan
- Layout: Quad-motor, individual wheel drive

Powertrain
- Electric motor: 4x AC induction/asynchronous, Permanent magnet motors
- Power output: 405 kW (543 hp; 551 PS)
- Battery: 115 kWh Li-ion
- Electric range: 802 km (498.3 mi) (CLTC)

Dimensions
- Wheelbase: 3,040 mm (119.7 in)
- Length: 5,240 mm (206.3 in)
- Width: 1,950 mm (76.8 in)
- Height: 1,495 mm (58.9 in)

The Mecha Dragon (Chinese: 机甲龙; pinyin: jījiǎ lóng) is a luxury electric sedan produced by Chinese car company Great Wall Motor under the Ora brand.

== Overview ==
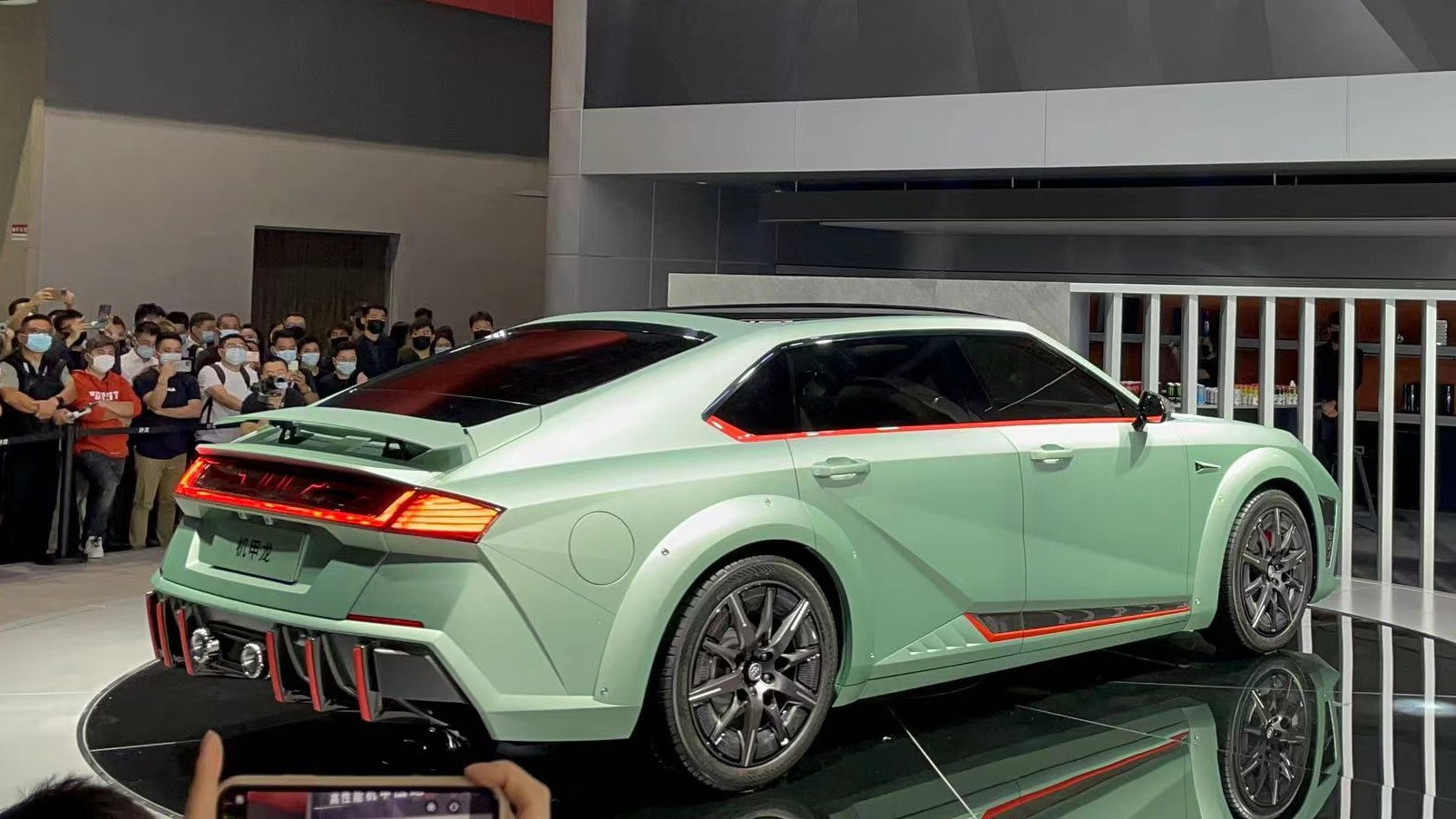
Rear view

Great Wall Motor unveiled the Sar Mecha Dragon at the 2021 Guangzhou Auto Show. It was originally planned as a limited-edition version with an initial production run of 101 units. Great Wall Motor plans to enter the luxury all-electric vehicle market with the Sar brand offering a price range between ¥400,000 ($62,685) and ¥800,000 ($125,370).

By March 2023, the Sar brand was cancelled. Instead, the Mecha Dragon was sold under the Ora brand.

== Battery specifications ==
The Sar Mecha Dragon has a combined output of 405 kW (543 hp; 551 PS) and up to 750 N⋅m (553 lb⋅ft) of torque from four electric motors. Acceleration of the Mecha Dragon from 0 to 100 km/h (0 to 62 mph) is in 3.7 seconds. The Mecha Dragon is equipped with Great Wall's Dayu battery pack with a capacity of 115kWh and 800-volt technology offering an 802 kilometres (498 mi) electric range according to China's light-duty vehicle test cycle (CLTC). With the 800V electrical architecture and a maximum DC fast-charging rate of 480 kW, the battery can add 401 kilometres (249 mi) of range within 10 minutes. The new generation battery can withstand temperatures of up to 1,000 °C (1,830 °F). The Sar also states that the Mecha Dragon can be wirelessly charged.
