= Ora Ballet Cat =

Battery electric compact car

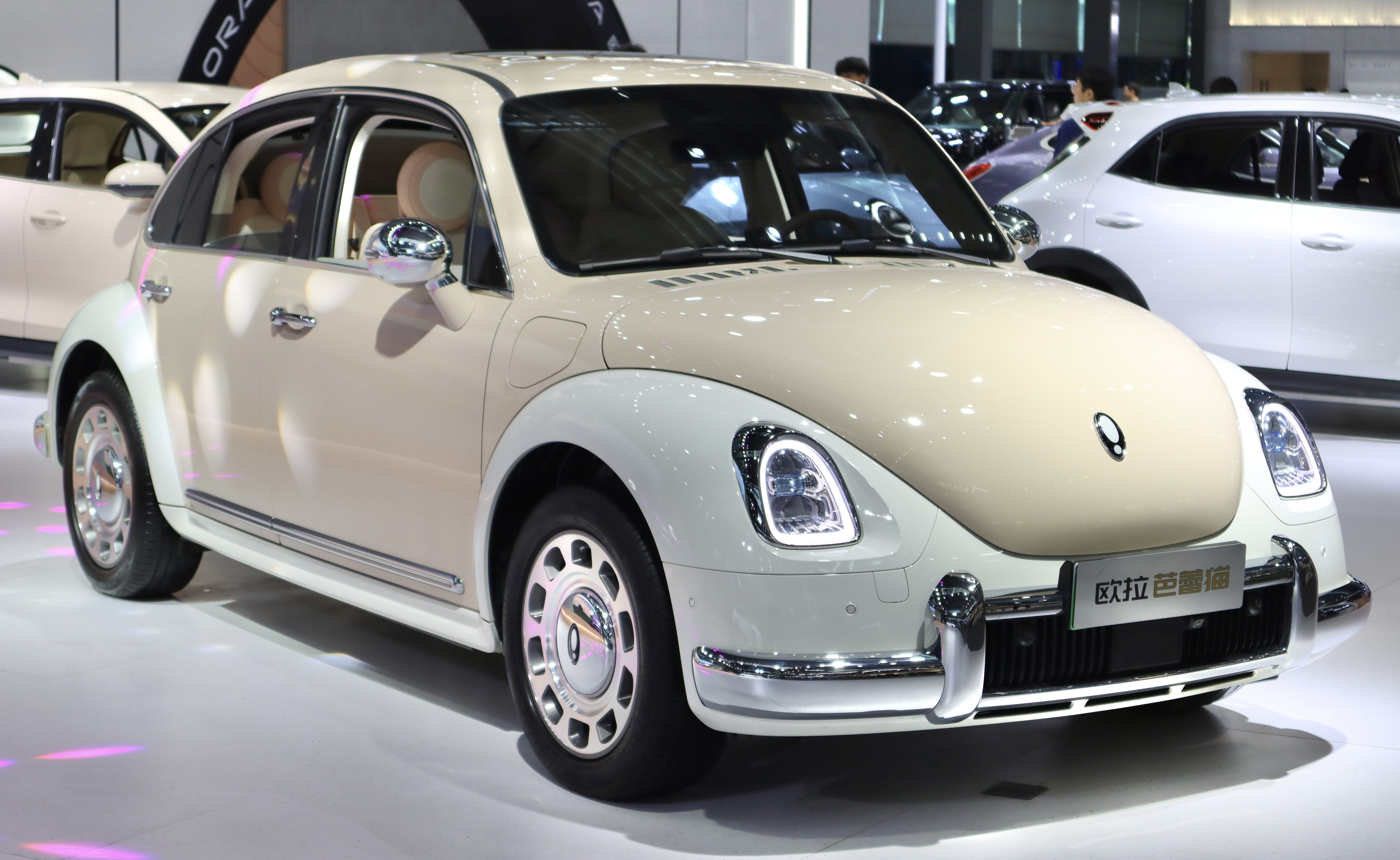

Overview
- Manufacturer: Great Wall Motor
- Production: 2022–present
- Assembly: China: Taizhou, Zhejiang

Body and chassis
- Class: Compact car (C)
- Body style: 5-door hatchback
- Layout: Front-motor, front-wheel-drive

Powertrain
- Electric motor: Permanent magnet synchronous motor
- Power output: 126 kW (171 PS; 169 hp) (2022–2026); 150 kW (204 PS; 201 hp) (2026–)
- Battery: Li-ion phosphate (LFP): 49.93 kWh / 400 Km; 60.5 kWh / 500 Km

Dimensions
- Wheelbase: 2,750 mm (108.3 in)
- Length: 4,401 mm (173.3 in)
- Width: 1,880 mm (74.0 in)
- Height: 1,633 mm (64.3 in)
- Curb weight: 2,183 kg (4,813 lb)

The Ora Ballet Cat (Chinese: 欧拉芭蕾猫; pinyin: Ōulā bālěi māo) is a battery electric compact hatchback produced by Chinese EV manufacturer Ora, a marque of Great Wall Motors since 2022.

== Overview ==
=== Ora Punk Cat Concept ===
The Ballet Cat was previewed by the Ora Punk Cat Concept at Auto Shanghai on 21 April 2021 in Shanghai, China, alongside the Ora Lightning Cat. Its styling is controversial as the car heavily resembles the Type 1 Volkswagen Beetle.

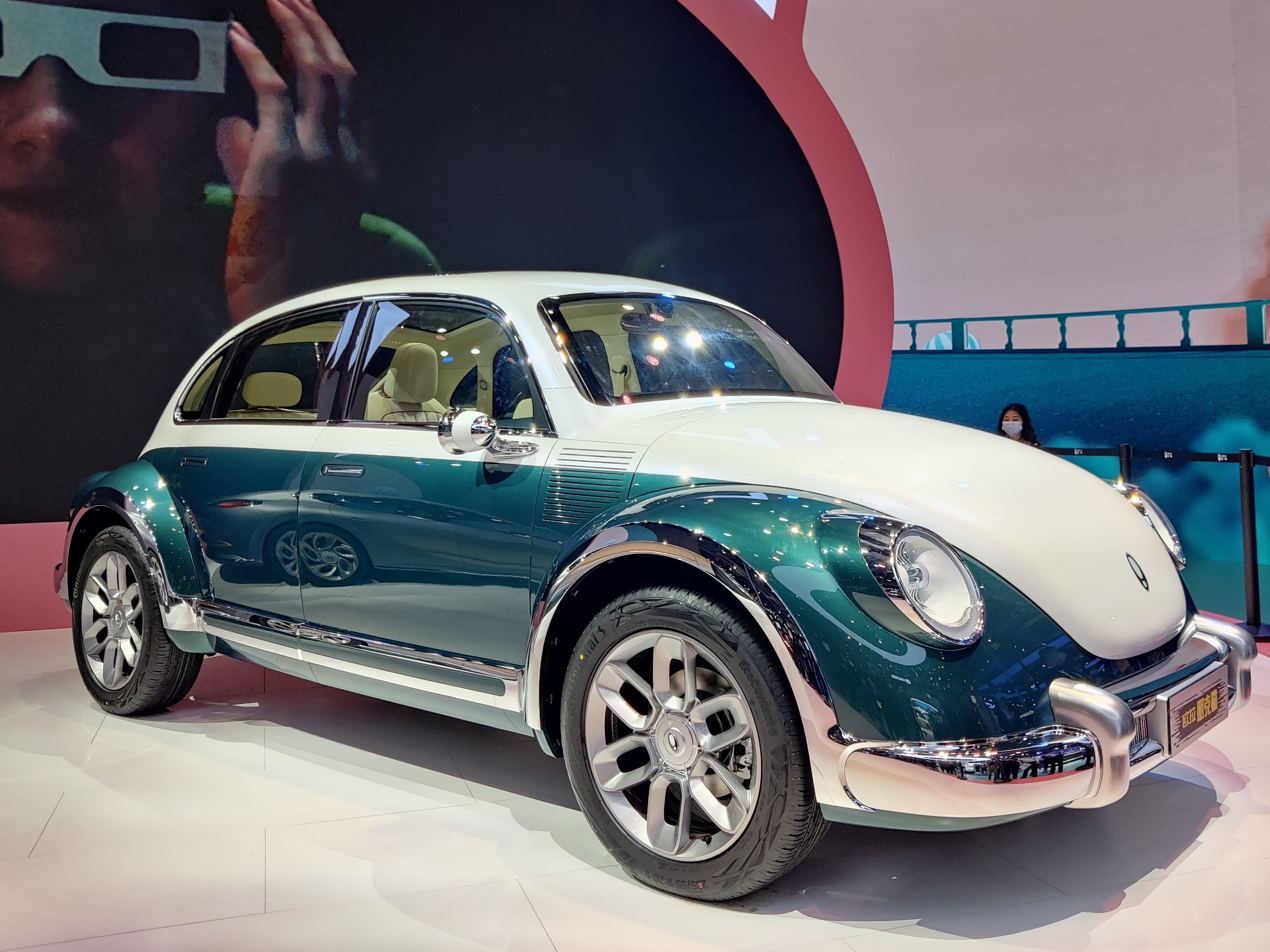
Ora Punk Cat Concept

=== Production model ===
In August, a slightly revised variant of the Punk Cat called the Ballet Cat was revealed as the production version. This version is marketed towards the female car buyer demographic.

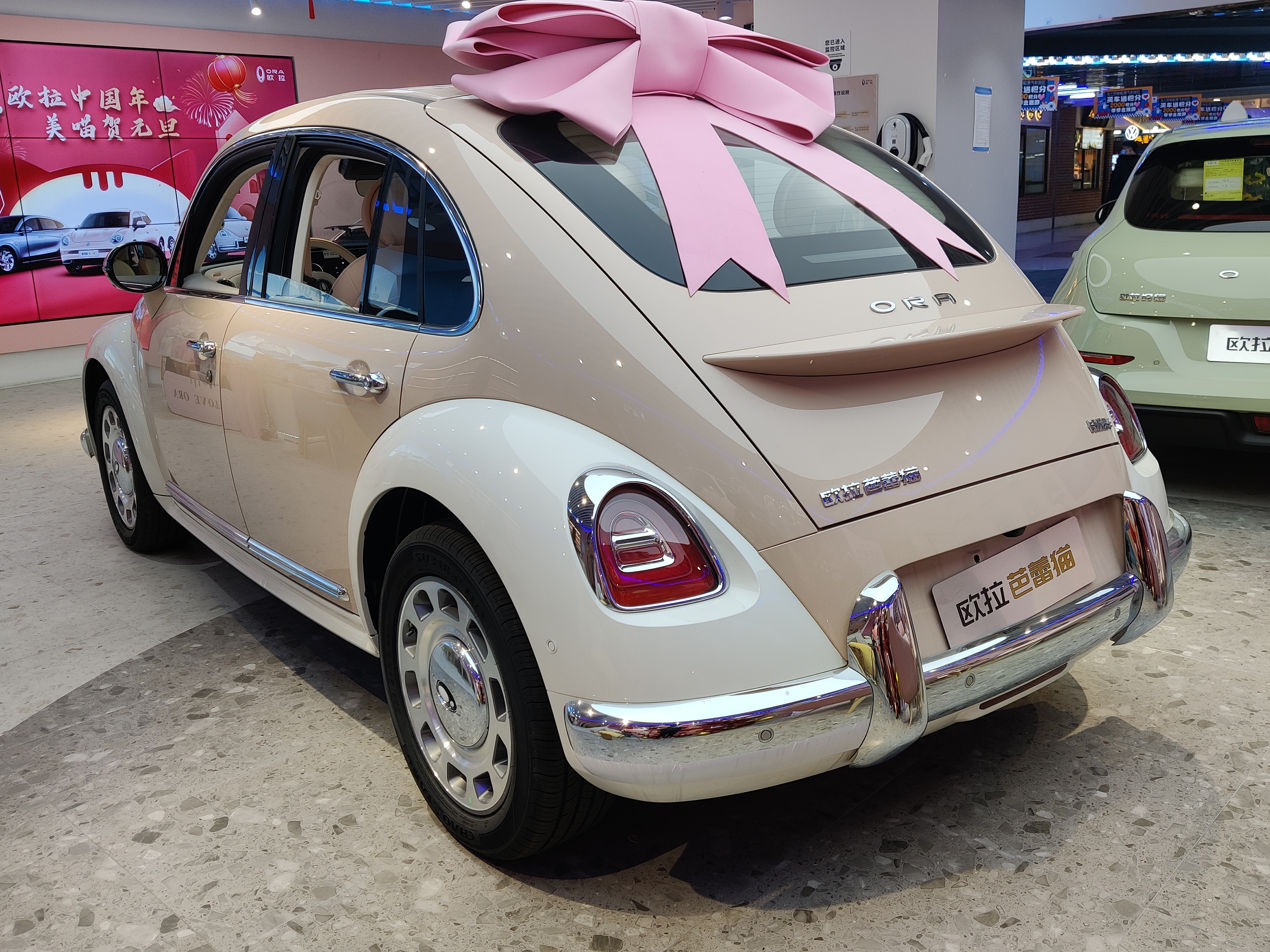
Rear view

== Specifications ==
The Ballet Cat is equipped with a 126 kW (169 hp; 171 PS) motor on the front axle, with the top speed limited to 155 km/h (96 mph). The Ballet Cat could be had with a LFP battery for 49.92 kWh (179.7 MJ) supporting a CLTC range of 401 km (249 mi) or a LFP battery for 60.5 kWh (218 MJ) supporting a CLTC range of 500 km (311 mi). The entry level trim level is called the Alice Edition, equipped with a 49.92-kilowatt-hour (179.7 MJ) battery for 401 km (249 mi) of CLTC range. Additionally, Ora-Pilot L2 autonomous driving system with ACC is also standard with the price being ¥193,000 RMB ($28,700 USD). The middle trim level is called the Nutcracker Edition priced at ¥203,000 RMB ($30,190 USD), equipped with the same 49.92 kWh (179.7 MJ) battery while adding heated front seats and self-parking system. The semi-top trim level, the Sleeping Beauty Edition, costing ¥213,000 RMB ($31,675 USD) is equipped with the 60.5-kilowatt-hour (218 MJ) battery supporting 500 km (311 mi) of CLTC range but lacks heated seats and a self-parking system. The top trim level of the Ballet Cat is called Swan Lake Edition. The Swan Lake Edition is equipped with the 60.5 kWh (218 MJ) battery with all the options for ¥223,000 RMB ($33,160 USD).

== Sales ==
Year	China
2022	3,816
2023	3,407
2024	1,935
2025	479
