= Ora iQ =

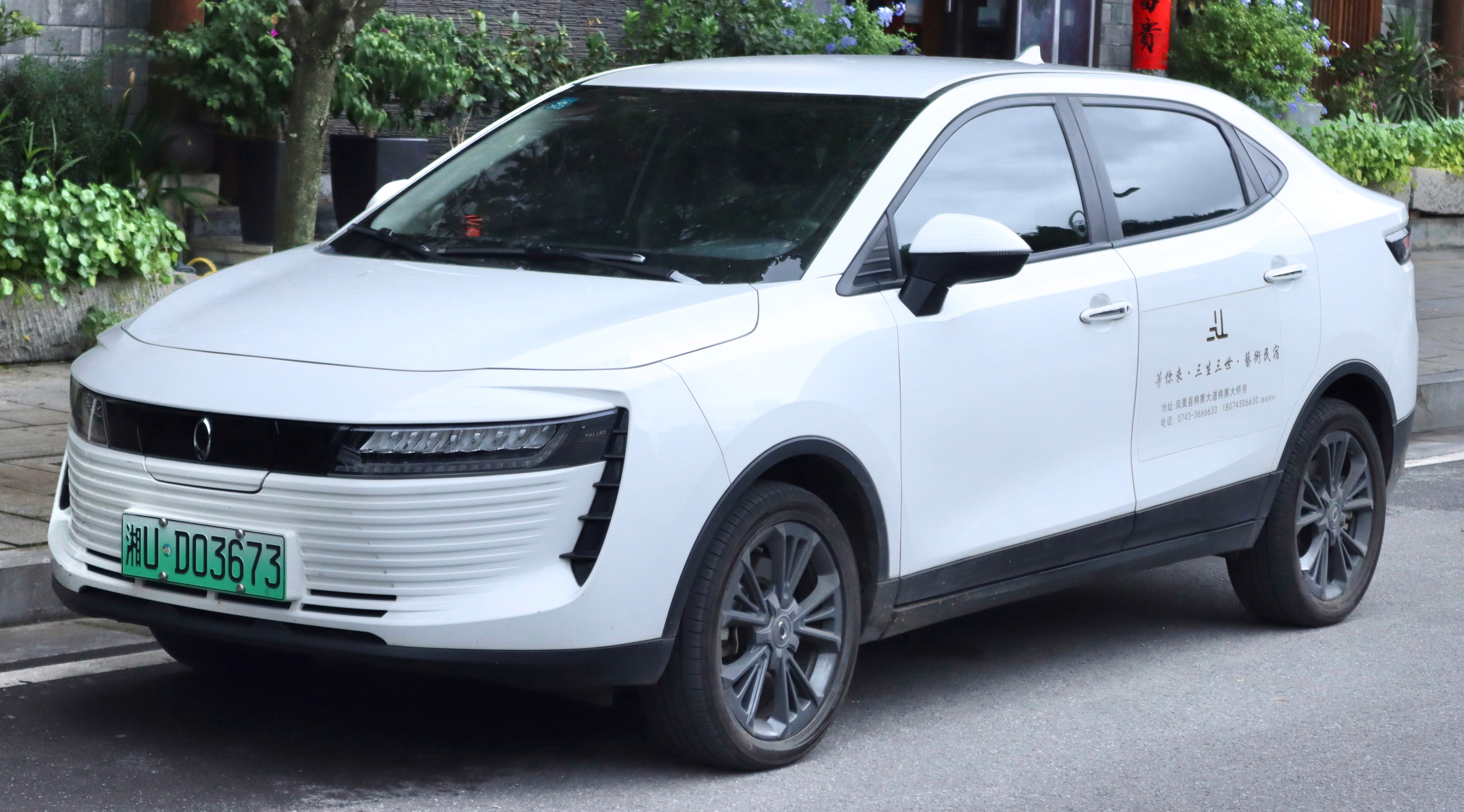

Overview
- Manufacturer: Great Wall Motor
- Also called: Ora iQ5
- Production: 2018–2020
- Assembly: China: Taizhou, Zhejiang

Body and chassis
- Class: Compact car
- Body style: 4-door sedan
- Layout: Front-motor, front-wheel-drive

Powertrain
- Electric motor: 120 kW (163 PS; 161 bhp) permanent magnet motor
- Transmission: Automatic
- Battery: 47 kWh lithium polymer (LMP) battery

Dimensions
- Wheelbase: 2,615 mm (103.0 in)
- Length: 4,445 mm (175.0 in)
- Width: 1,785 mm (70.3 in)
- Height: 1,567 mm (61.7 in)

Chronology
- Successor: Ora 5

The Ora iQ is a battery electric compact car produced by the Chinese car manufacturer Great Wall Motors under its electric vehicle brand Ora in 2018–2020.

== Overview ==
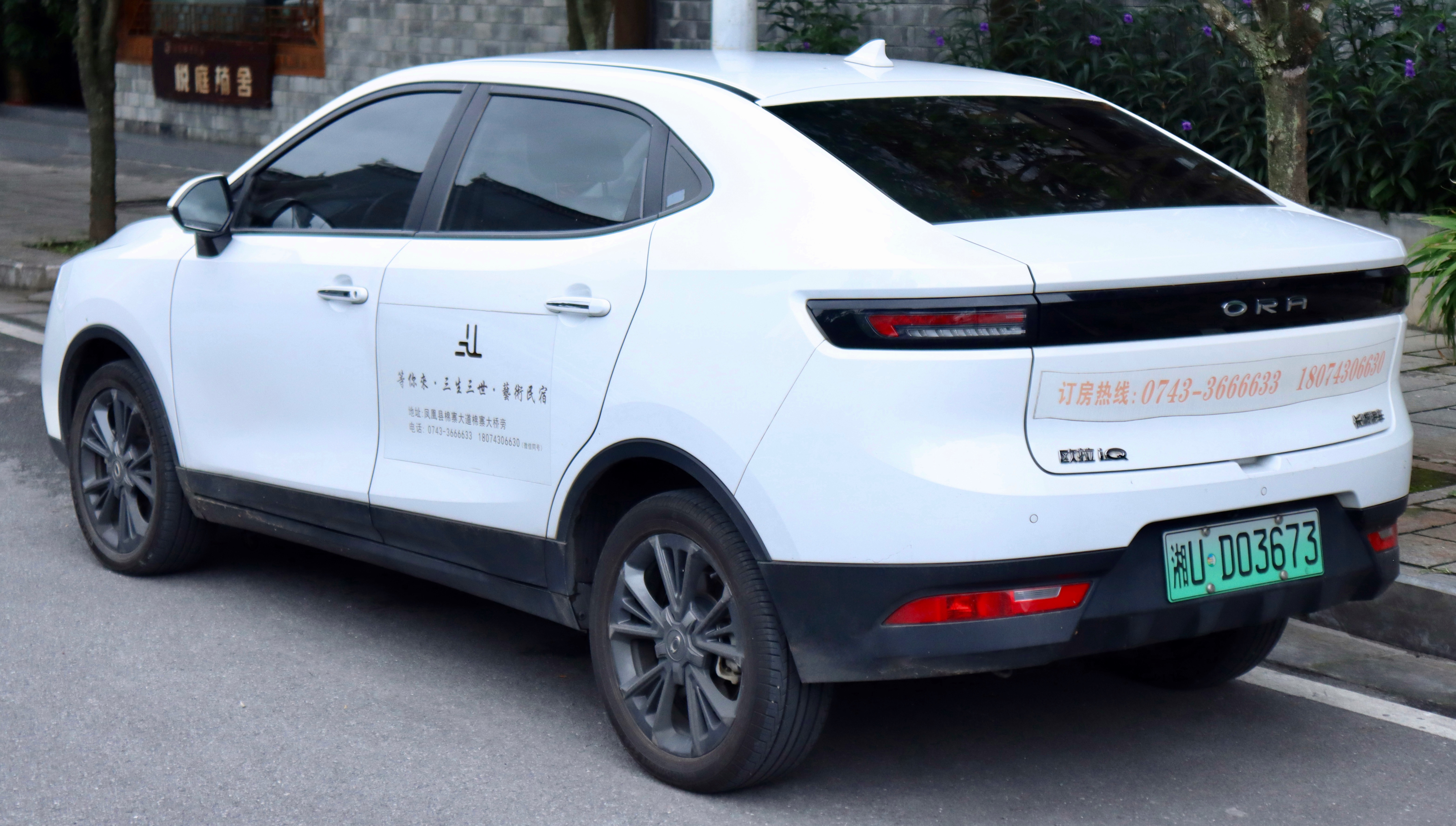
Rear view

In May 2018, Great Wall Motors announced the launch of the new Ora electric car brand. The first model was the compact iQ model combining the features of a crossover with a three-box sedan body.

The characteristic features of the exterior were narrow, longitudinal headlights with cutouts at the edges of the fenders, as well as long, one-piece rear lamps running across the entire width of the body. In its first full year of sales, 2019, Ora sold 10.3 thousand iQ units. The car did not gain much popularity in the long run and was withdrawn from production at the end of 2020, disappearing from the offer in favor of newer models from the "Cat" line.

== Powertrain ==
The iQ is an electric crossover with a battery capacity of 46.57 kWh. The car develops 100 km/h in 7.7 seconds, reaches a maximum of 150 km/h and develops 163 HP at 280 Nm of maximum torque.

== Safety ==
C-NCAP (2018) test results 2019 Ora iQ Smartlink
Category		%
Overall:	4 /5 stars	72.22%
Occupant protection:		84.11%
Vulnerable road users:		62.18%
Active safety:		26.67%
