= Ora Good Cat =

Battery electric compact car

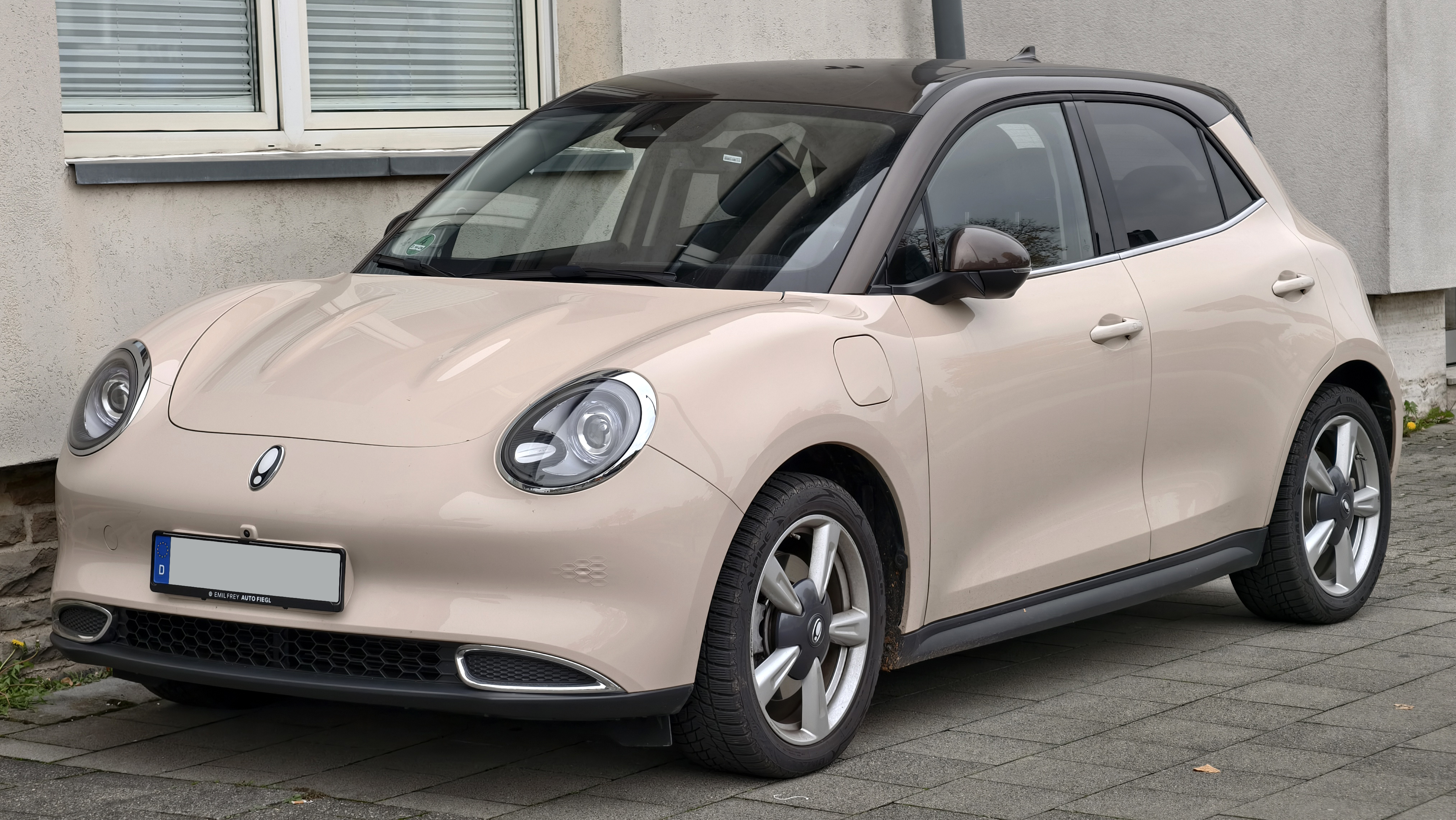
- GWM Ora 03

Overview
- Manufacturer: Great Wall Motor
- Model code: ES11
- Also called: Ora Haomao; Ora Funky Cat (Europe until end of 2023, Israel); GWM Ora (Australia, Nepal); GWM Ora 03 (Europe starting 2024, Brazil, Southern Cone, Bolivia, Ecuador, Indonesia)
- Production: 2020–present
- Assembly: China: Taizhou, Zhejiang (GWM Taizhou Smart Factory); Thailand: Rayong (GWM Thailand, 2023–2026); Indonesia: Bogor (Inchcape Indomobil)
- Designer: Emanuel Derta

Body and chassis
- Class: Compact car (C)
- Body style: 5-door hatchback
- Layout: Front-motor, front-wheel-drive

Powertrain
- Electric motor: Permanent magnet synchronous
- Power output: 143 hp (145 PS; 107 kW); 171 hp (173 PS; 128 kW) (GT)
- Transmission: 1-speed direct-drive
- Battery: 47.8 kWh LFP CATL; 57.7 kWh LFP SVOLT; 59.1 kWh NMC CATL; 63.1 kWh NMC CATL
- Electric range: Up to 501 km (311 mi) (NEDC)

Dimensions
- Wheelbase: 2,650 mm (104.3 in)
- Length: 4,235 mm (166.7 in)
- Width: 1,825 mm (71.9 in)
- Height: 1,596 mm (62.8 in)
- Kerb weight: 1,438–1,560 kg (3,170–3,439 lb)

Chronology
- Predecessor: Great Wall Florid
- Successor: Ora 5

The Ora Good Cat (Chinese: 欧拉好猫; pinyin: Ōulā Hǎomāo) is a battery electric hatchback produced by Great Wall Motor under its electric car marque Ora since November 2020. It is marketed as the Ora Funky Cat in several markets, GWM Ora 03 in Europe, Brazil and Indonesia and GWM Ora in Australia and Nepal.

== Overview ==
The Ora Good Cat was first revealed at the Chengdu Auto Show on 24 July 2020, with a retro aesthetic styled by former Porsche designer Emanuel Derta. Sales of the vehicle in China began on 24 November 2020. Sales in Thailand began on 29 October 2021 with the vehicles being imported from China. GWM started marketing vehicle in the European market in 2022 as the Funky Cat.

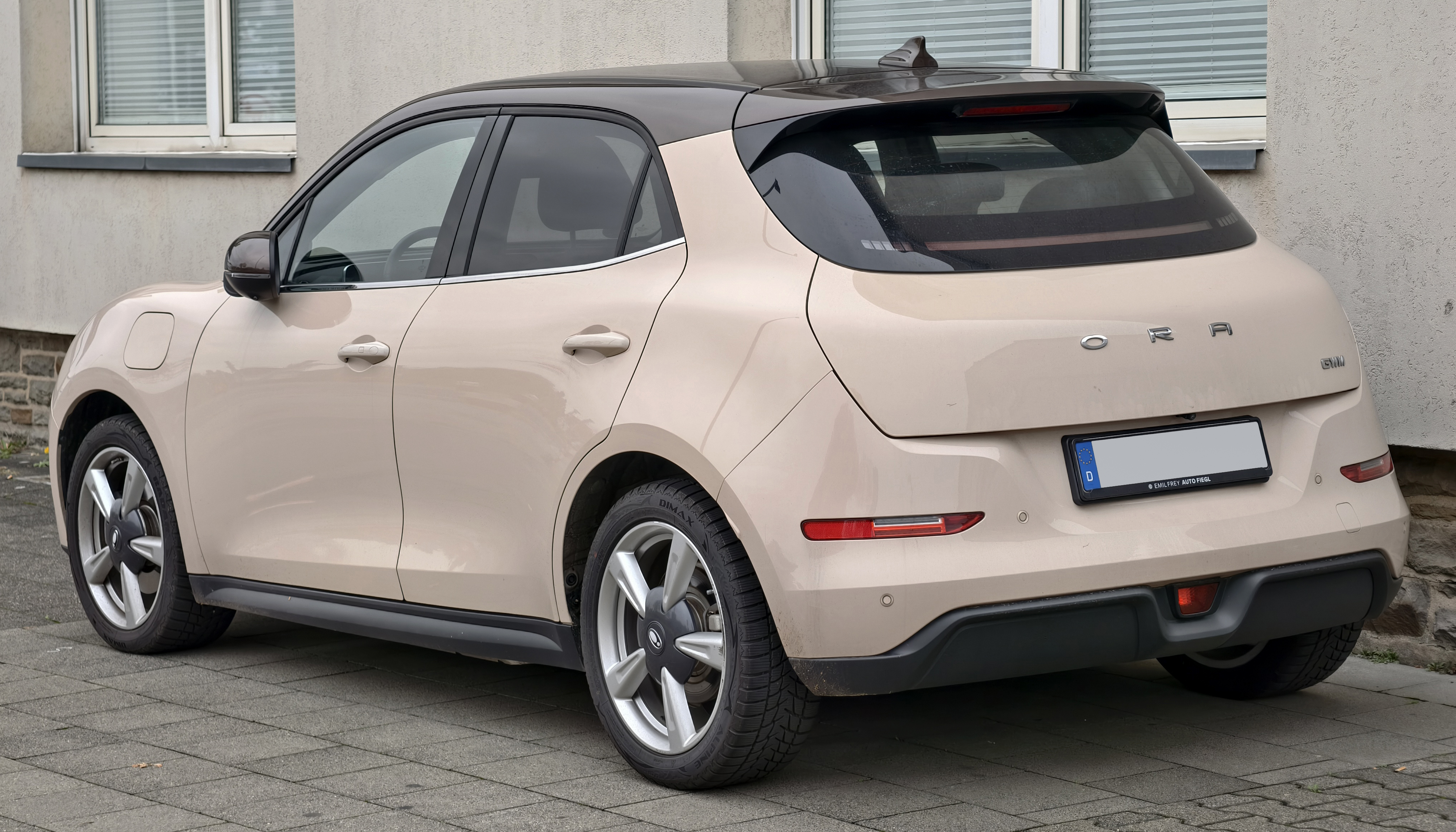
Rear view

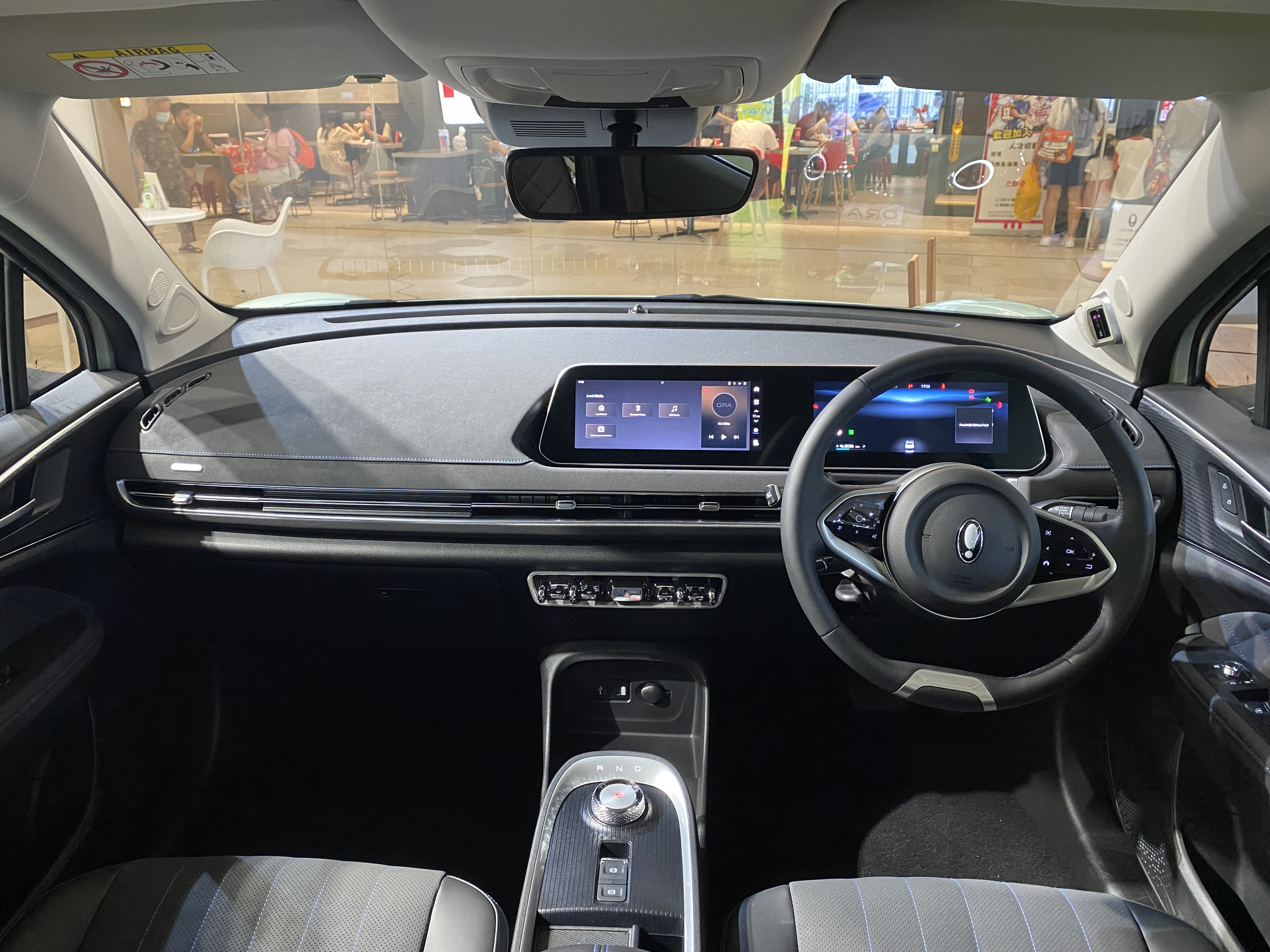
Interior

=== 2025 (facelift) ===
The Ora Good Cat received a facelift in June 2025. The updated model became standard with front motors developing 171 PS (126 kW) and 220 Nm of torque. All trim levels across the range received a lithium iron phosphate (LFP) battery that delivers a range of 430 km on China’s CLTC cycle.

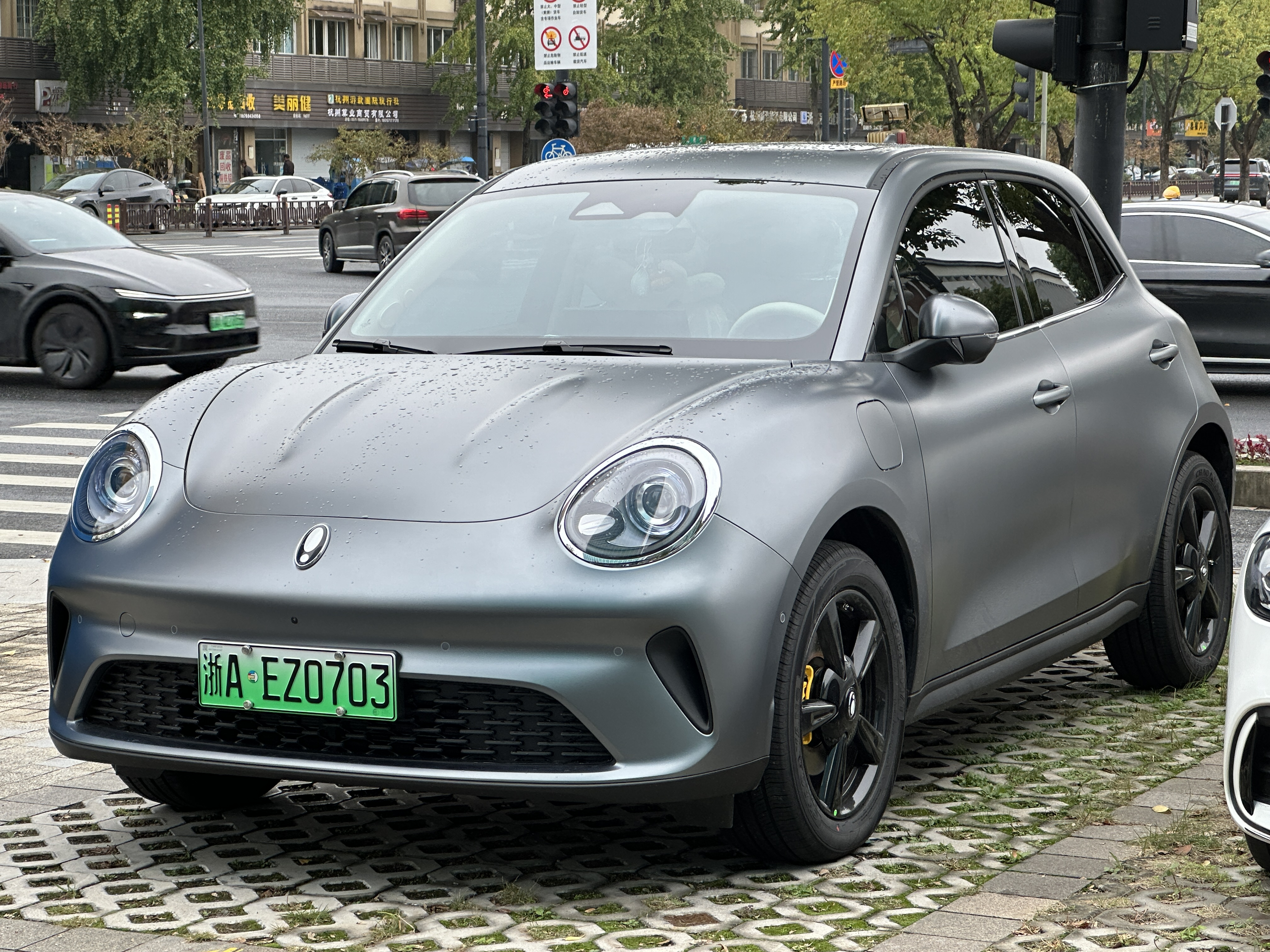
Ora Good Cat 2025 (facelift)

== Ora Good Cat GT ==
The performance-oriented GT variant of the Good Cat features redesigned and more aggressive styling, and is equipped with an electric motor producing 170 hp (172 PS; 127 kW), with a maximum torque of 210 N⋅m (21.4 kg⋅m; 155 lb⋅ft) and claimed range of 300–400 km (190–250 mi).

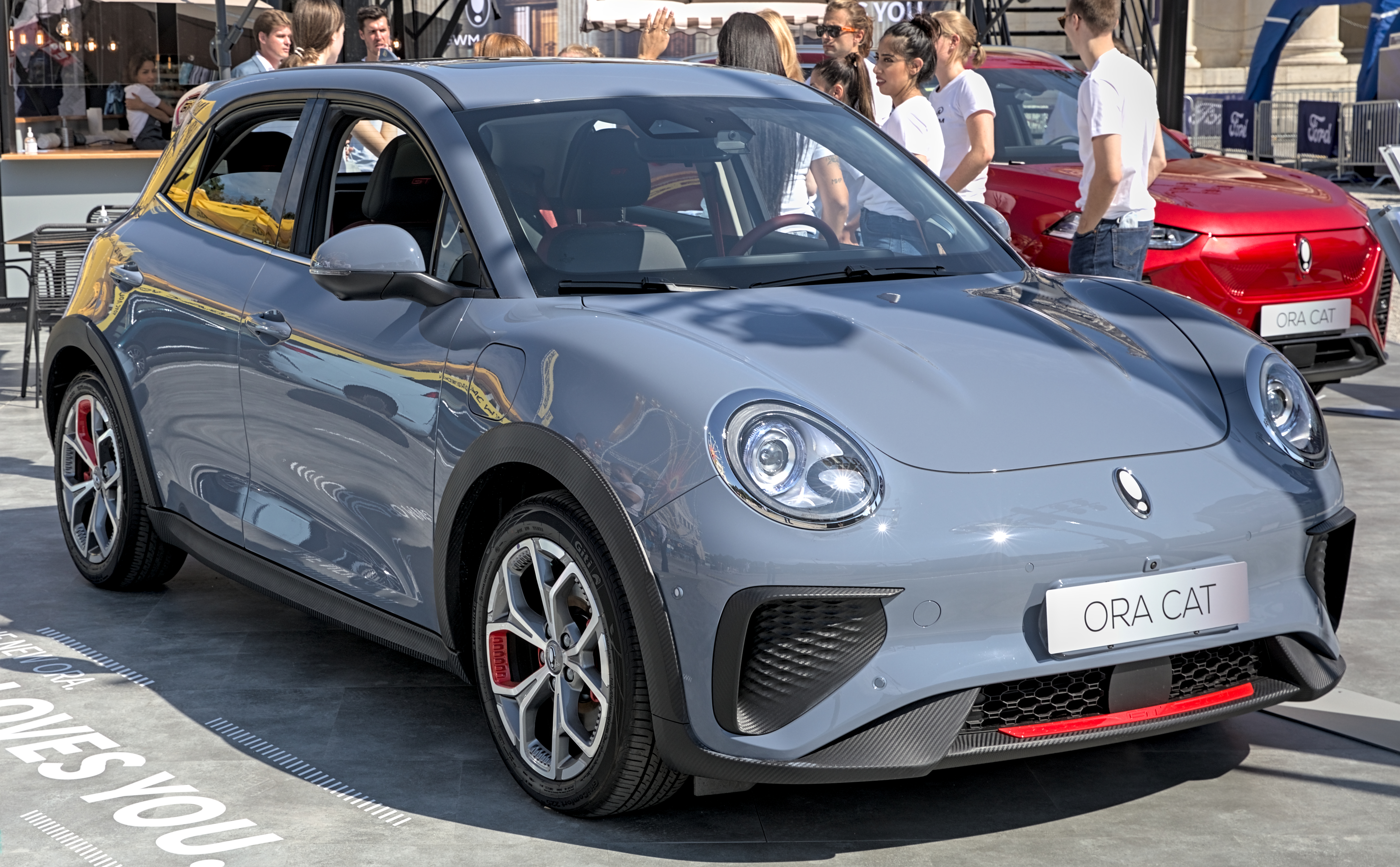
Ora Good Cat GT

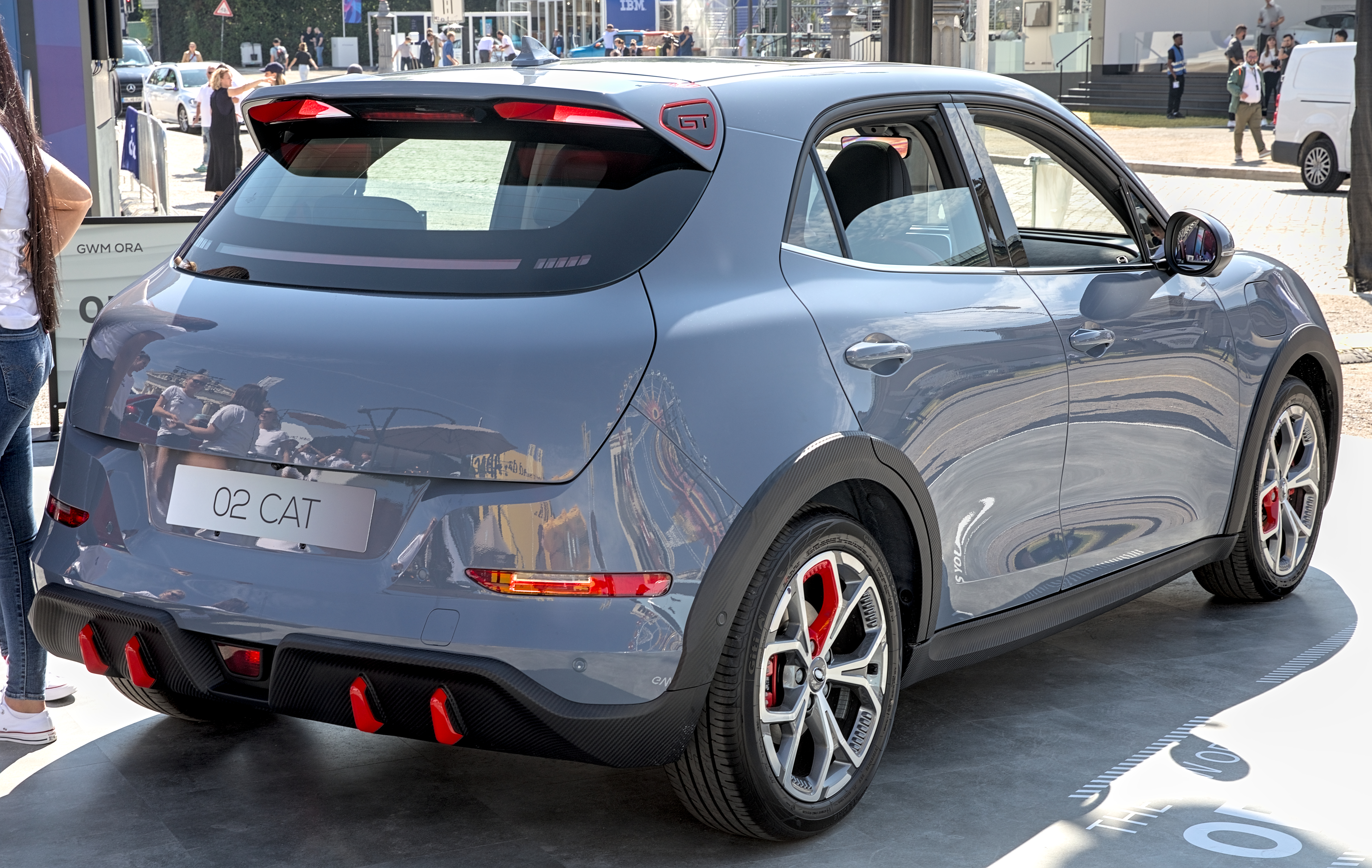
Rear view

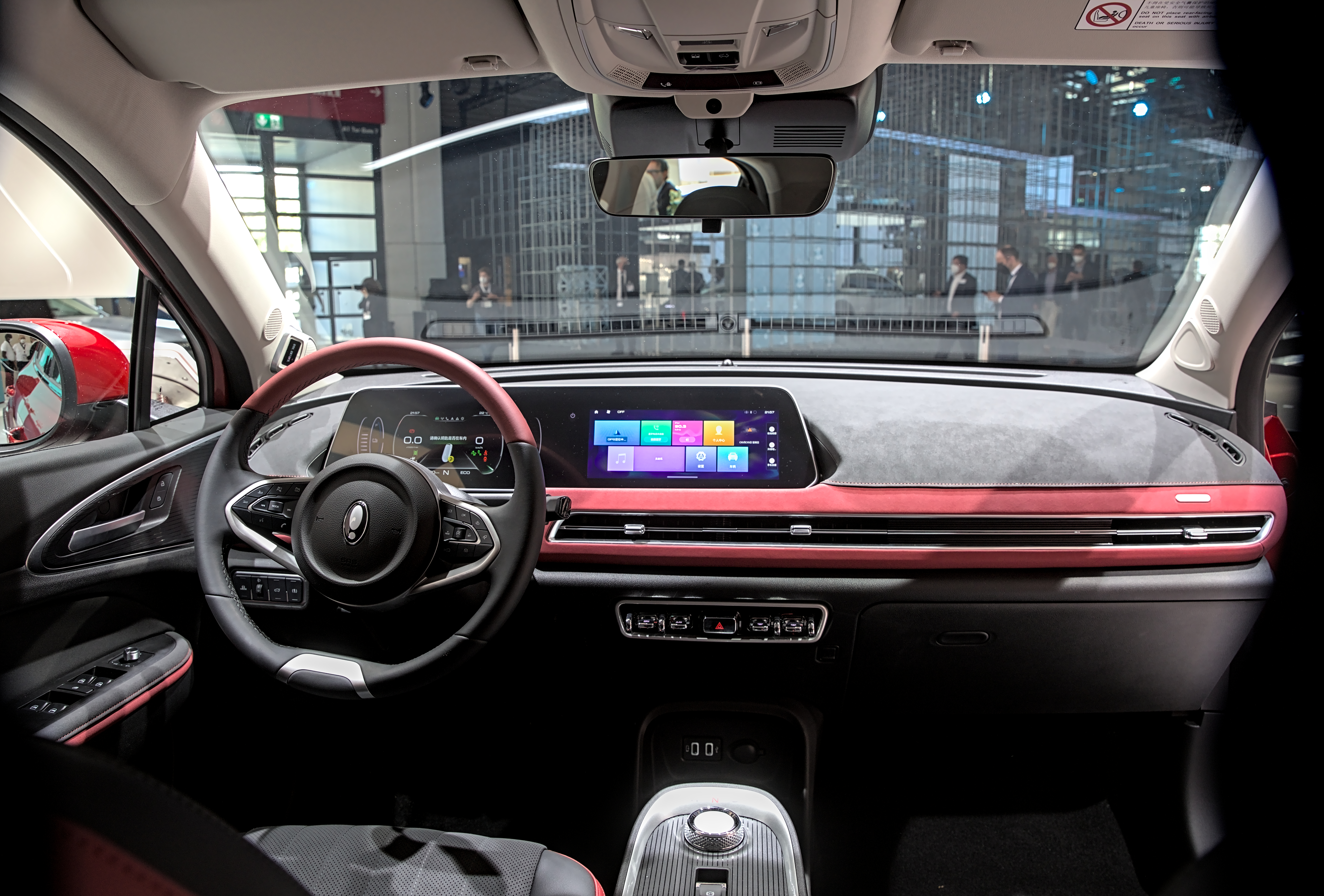
Interior

== Powertrain ==
The Tech and Pro trim of the Good Cat offer a all-electric range of 400 km (250 mi) based on the NEDC standard from a 47.8 kWh LFP battery; a front-mounted electric motor rated at 143 PS (141 hp; 105 kW) of power output and 210 N⋅m (155 lb⋅ft) of torque offers a top speed of 152 km/h (94 mph). The Ultra trim features a 63.1 kWh ternary Li-NMC battery, increasing the range to 500 km (310 mi) based on the NEDC cycle, while retaining the same 143 PS/210 Nm electric motor.

== Markets ==
=== Australia ===
The GWM Ora was launched in Australia on 5 July 2023, with four variants: Standard Range, Extended Range, Ultra and GT. The mid-range Ultra variant was discontinued in August 2024.

In August 2025, the GWM Ora line-up was updated for the 2025 model year. All Ora variants for the Australian market became sourced from Thailand instead of China, with improved standard equipment. All variants use the new 57.7 kWh lithium-iron phosphate (LFP) battery pack. The 2025 model year Ora was available with three variants: Lux, Ultra (limited to 30 units), and GT.

=== Brazil ===
The Ora 03 was launched in Brazil on 20 July 2023, with two variants: Skin and GT.

=== Europe ===
The Ora Funky Cat made its European debut in October 2022, as part of GWM's entry to Europe.

In November 2023, the Ora Funky Cat was renamed to Ora 03 as part of new ‘One GWM’ branding strategy.

=== Indonesia ===
The Ora 03 was first previewed in Indonesia at the 30th Gaikindo Indonesia International Auto Show on 10 August 2023 and was launched on 26 June 2025. Initially imported from China, it is available in the sole variant using the 47.8 kWh battery pack.

=== Malaysia ===
The Ora Good Cat was launched in Malaysia on 28 November 2022, with two variants: 400 Pro and 500 Ultra.

In November 2025, the Good Cat line-up was updated for the 2026 model year. All Good Cat variants use the new 57.7 kWh lithium-iron phosphate (LFP) battery pack and the introduction of the GT variant.

=== Mexico ===
The Ora 03 was launched in Mexico on 1 October 2023, with two variants: Premium and Luxury, both variants use the 47.8 kWh battery pack.

=== New Zealand ===
The GWM Ora was launched in New Zealand on 9 February 2023, with four variants: Standard Range, Extended Range, Ultra and GT.

=== South Africa ===
The Ora 03 went on sale in South Africa on 15 November 2023, with four variants: 300 Super Luxury, 400 Super Luxury, 400 Ultra Luxury and 400 GT Ultra Luxury.

=== Thailand ===
The Good Cat was launched in Thailand on 21 March 2022, with three variants: 400 Tech, 400 Pro and 500 Ultra. The GT variant followed in June 2022. The 400 Tech variant was discontinued in February 2023. The Good Cat became locally assembled at the GWM Thailand plant in January 2024, with numerous exterior and interior updates.

In February 2026, the GWM Thailand announced the discontinuation of the sales of Ora Good Cat, to make way for its successor (in Thailand), the Ora 5.

== Safety ==
In September 2022, the vehicle was tested for automotive safety by Euro NCAP.

Euro NCAP test results Ora Funky Cat (2022)
Test	Points	%
Overall:	5 /5 stars	
Adult occupant:	35.3	92%
Child occupant:	40.8	83%
Pedestrian:	40.0	74%
Safety assist:	15.0	93%

ANCAP test results GWM Ora (2022, aligned with Euro NCAP)
Test	Points	%
Overall:	5 /5 stars	
Adult occupant:	35.29	92%
Child occupant:	41.59	84%
Pedestrian:	40.02	74%
Safety assist:	14.94	93%

== Sales ==
Year	China			Thailand (Note: Figures based on registration (Thailand))	Malaysia (Note: Figures based on registration (Malaysia))	Brazil	Mexico	Indonesia
Year	Good Cat	GT	Total	Thailand	Malaysia	Brazil	Mexico	Indonesia
2020			2,016					
2021			50,931					
2022			52,800	3,828	15			
2023	67,435	3,983	71,418	6,712	463	775	127	
2024	38,126	9,300	47,426	2,426	615	6,326	858	
2025	30,123	38	30,161	5,946		3,238	366	383
