= Kantanka Automobile =

Ghanaian automotive company

Kantanka Automobile Co. Ltd.
- Industry: Automotive
- Founded: 1994
- Headquarters: Ghana
- Key people: Kwadwo Safo Kantanka (Director)
- Products: Automobiles
- Owner: Kwadwo Safo Kantanka Jnr.
- Website: Official site

Kantanka Automobile is a Ghanaian based automotive company that designs, manufactures, assembles and sells luxury cars. It was established in 1994 by entrepreneur and preacher Kwadwo Safo Kantanka. It was incorporated as a limited liability which is into the manufacturing of automotive components and their combination with other parts outsourced from component suppliers to form a complete built unit. In 1998, the first complete built unit (CBU) was manufactured using over 75% of local components, locally manufactured including the engine block. By 2006, the first SUV, the Onantefo, was manufactured.

Kantanka vehicles are assembled in Ghana from knock-down kits supplied by a Chinese firm, possibly Foday via Chongqing Big Science & Technology.

== Models ==
The Kantanka range of cars includes both saloon and four-wheel drive vehicles.

- Amoanimaa (Crossover Sedan).
- K71 (Subcompact Crossover SUV).
- Mensah (Mid-size sedan).
- Nkunimdie (Mid-size SUV).
- Omama (Mid-size Pickup truck).
- Onantefo (Mid-size SUV).
- Otumfuo (SUV).
- Opasuo (Mid-size SUV)

== Military hardware ==
Kantanka is alleged to have manufactured military hardware such as armoured personnel carriers, tanks, and helicopters. However these devices appear to use fireworks as their primary weapons system. They have also developed combat exoskeletons, which appear to function more as costume props than true weapons systems.

Kantanka launched an armoured vehicle with rangefinder in the 2018 Annual Technology Show at Apostle Safo School of Arts and Sciences.

The Kantanka range of military vehicles includes both air and ground vehicles, as well as infantry equipment.

=== Models ===
- Kantanka-ABV, Armored Bullion Vehicle, slated for use as police SUV (Bullet Proof Glass and Armor Plating, based on Kantanka Onantefo)
- Kantanka-KTK2, Helicopter - Single Crew, rocket Attack Helicopter
- Kantanka-KTK Car, 4-Wheeled Light Weapons Platform - Crewless Drone Vehicle
- Kantanka-SPG, 4-Wheeled Fighting Artillery, - 3 crew/3 passengers, Main gun and side mounted rocket tubes
- Kantanka-ACCRA APC, 8-Wheeled Fighting Armoured Personnel Carrier, (4 metres tall/13 feet), 4 crew, 20 passengers
- Kantanka-GLITZ Walker, Bipedal Mechanized "Chicken Walker"
- Kantanka-Infantry Exoskeleton, Passively Powered via "Gear weight and Hydraulics" (Claimed).
- Kantanka Okofuo - armored car
- Kantanka Okofo - armored truck

== Gallery ==
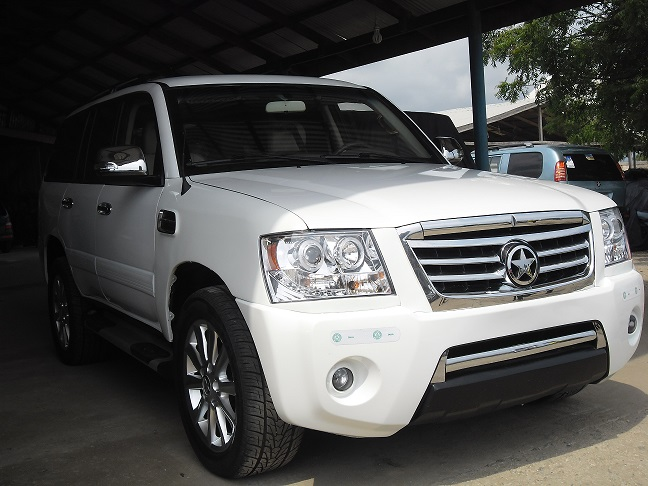
Kantanka Otumfo SUV assembled in Gomoa Mpota, which is located in Central Region, Ghana
