= Foday Landfort =

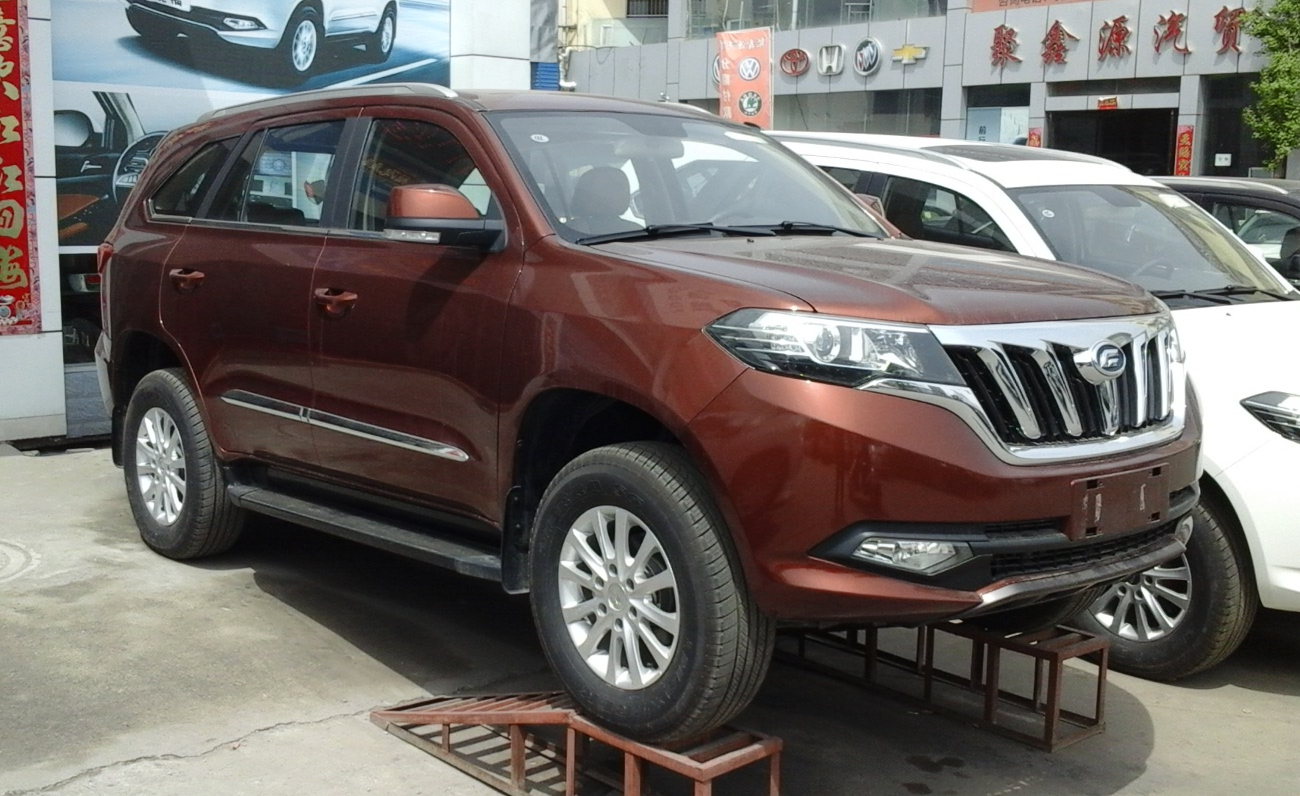

Overview
- Also called: SAF Landfort; Dongfeng Yufeng S16; Dayun Y5; Sandstorm Alreem; Innoson G6 (Nigeria); Kantanka Onantefo (Ghana); Esemka Garuda (Indonesia)
- Production: 2015–2020
- Assembly: China: Foshan; Bangladesh; Malaysia: Tampoi, Johor (EKA); Iran, Saveh (Ilia Automobile MFG.)

Body and chassis
- Related: Foday Lion F22

Powertrain
- Engine: Petrol: 2.4 L 4G69S4N I4; Diesel: 1.9 L T19TCIE2 I4 turbo
- Transmission: 5-speed manual 6-speed automatic

Dimensions
- Wheelbase: 2,790 mm (109.8 in)
- Length: 4,771 mm (187.8 in)
- Width: 1,870 mm (73.6 in)
- Height: 1,828 mm (72.0 in)
- Curb weight: 1,885–1,955 kg (4,155.7–4,310.0 lb)

Chronology
- Predecessor: Foday Explorer 6

The Foday Landfort (Chinese: 揽福) is a mid-size body-on-frame sport utility vehicle (SUV) produced by Foday since 2015. It is the base of the Foday Lion F22 pickup truck, and it was developed and destined mainly for the Asia-Pacific region.

== Overview ==
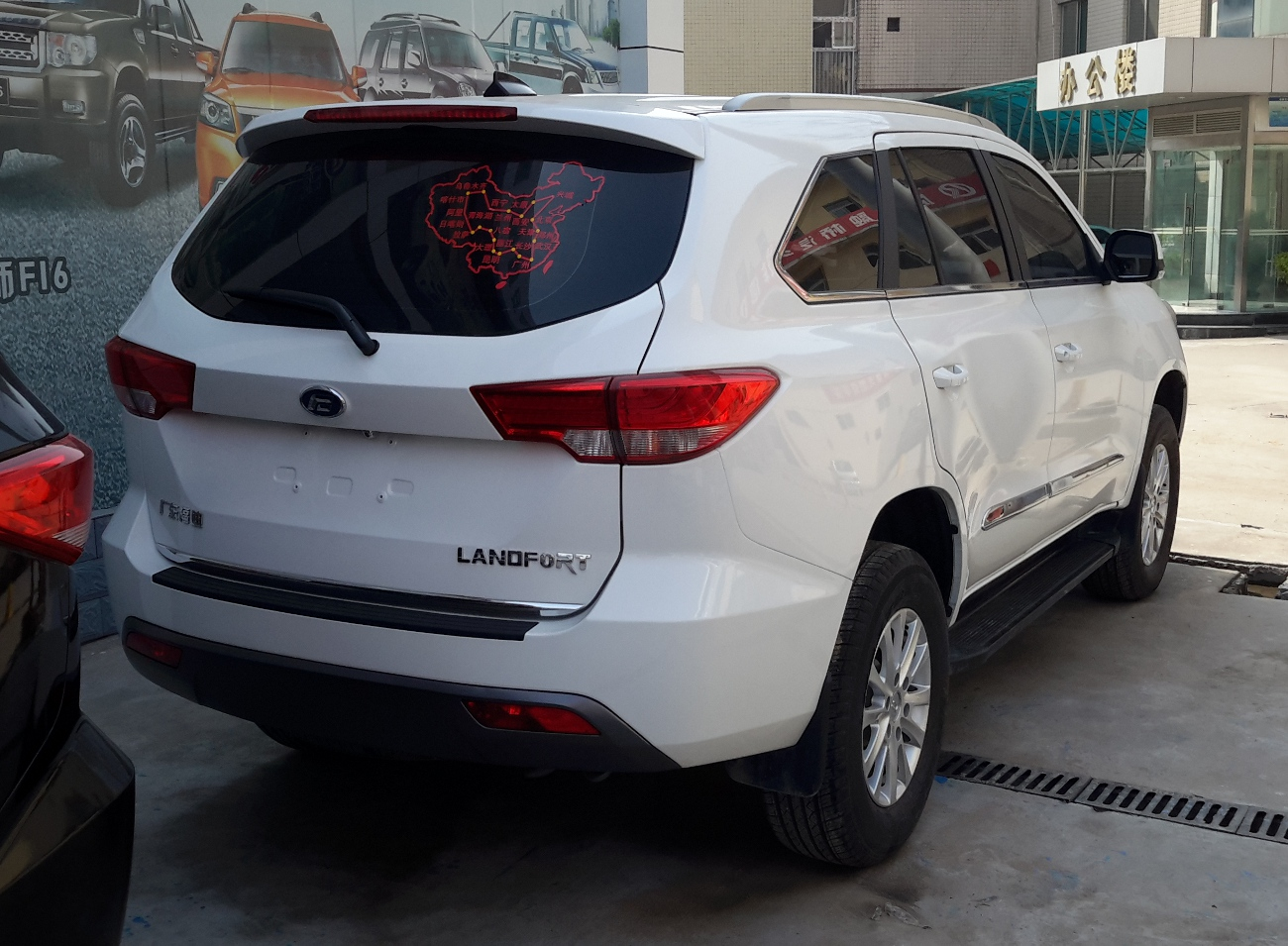
Foday Landfort rear

The Foday Landfort was launched in November 2014 as a 2015 model in the Chinese market as a 7-seater body-on-frame mid-size SUV. The suspension system is double wishbone spiral spring independent suspension for the front and five-point spiral spring type non-independent suspension for the rear.

=== Interior ===
The interior features a 7-inch screen and DVD with aux-in compatibility.

=== Powertrain ===
The Landfort is powered by a Mitsubishi-derived 4G69S4N 2.4-litre petrol engine delivering 134 hp (100 kW; 136 PS) at 5,250 rpm and 200 N⋅m (150 lb⋅ft) of torque from 2,500 to 3,000 rpm. A 1.9-litre turbodiesel with 136 hp (101 kW; 138 PS) and 300 N⋅m (220 lb⋅ft) is also offered. Transmission options are five-speed manual and six-speed automatic transmissions, with both two-wheel drive and four-wheel drive available for configuration with rear-wheel-drive layout as standard and optional four-wheel-drive.

=== Markets ===
In Malaysia, Enggang Keramat Automobile launched a Malaysian car brand called SAF, named after the arrangement of Muslims in prayer in April 2016. The lineup of the SAF brand consists of rebadged models from the Chinese brand Foday. The rebadged models include the Lion F22 pick-up truck and the Landfort seven-seater SUV, with the two vehicles rebadged as the SAF Striker and SAF Landfort respectively with the designs still being identical to the original Foday models. Both models are being produced at Oriental Assemblers, the same company that also assembles Chery models in Malaysia in Tampoi, Johor.
