= Jinbei S30 =

Chinese automobile

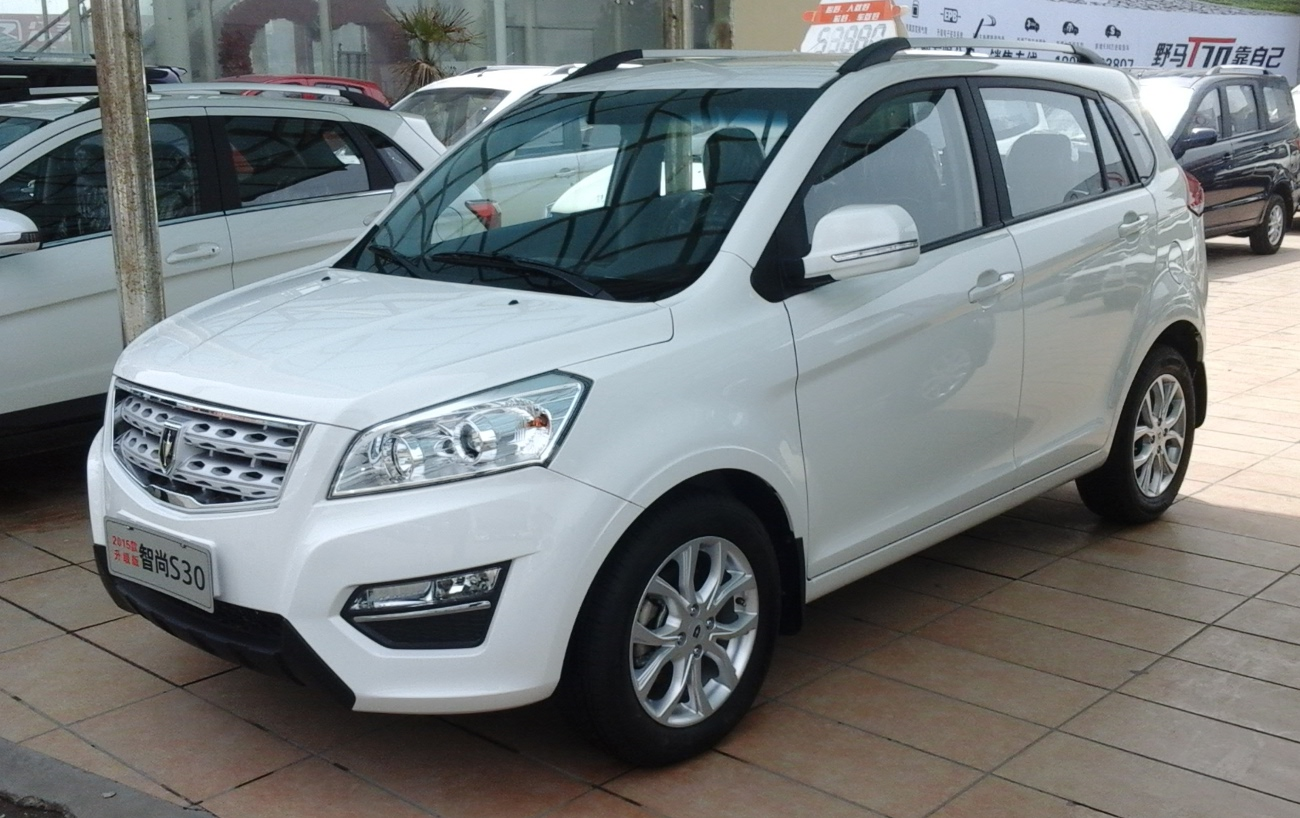
- Jinbei S30 facelift

Overview
- Manufacturer: Jinbei (marque)
- Also called: Jinbei S35; Kantanka K71 (Ghana)
- Production: 2012–2017 (S30); 2015–2017 (S35)
- Assembly: China

Body and chassis
- Class: Subcompact crossover SUV
- Body style: 5-door hatchback
- Layout: Front-engine, front-wheel-drive/four-wheel drive

Powertrain
- Engine: 1.5 L I4 gasoline
- Transmission: 5-speed automatic 5-speed manual

Dimensions
- Wheelbase: 2,500 mm (98 in)
- Length: 4,005 mm (158 in)
- Width: 1,725 mm (68 in)
- Height: 1,640–1,644 mm (65–65 in)
- Curb weight: 535–547 kg (1,180–1,206 lb)

The Jinbei S30 or Jinbei Zhishang S30 (金杯 智尚S30) is a subcompact crossover SUV manufactured by Jinbei in China.

== Overview ==
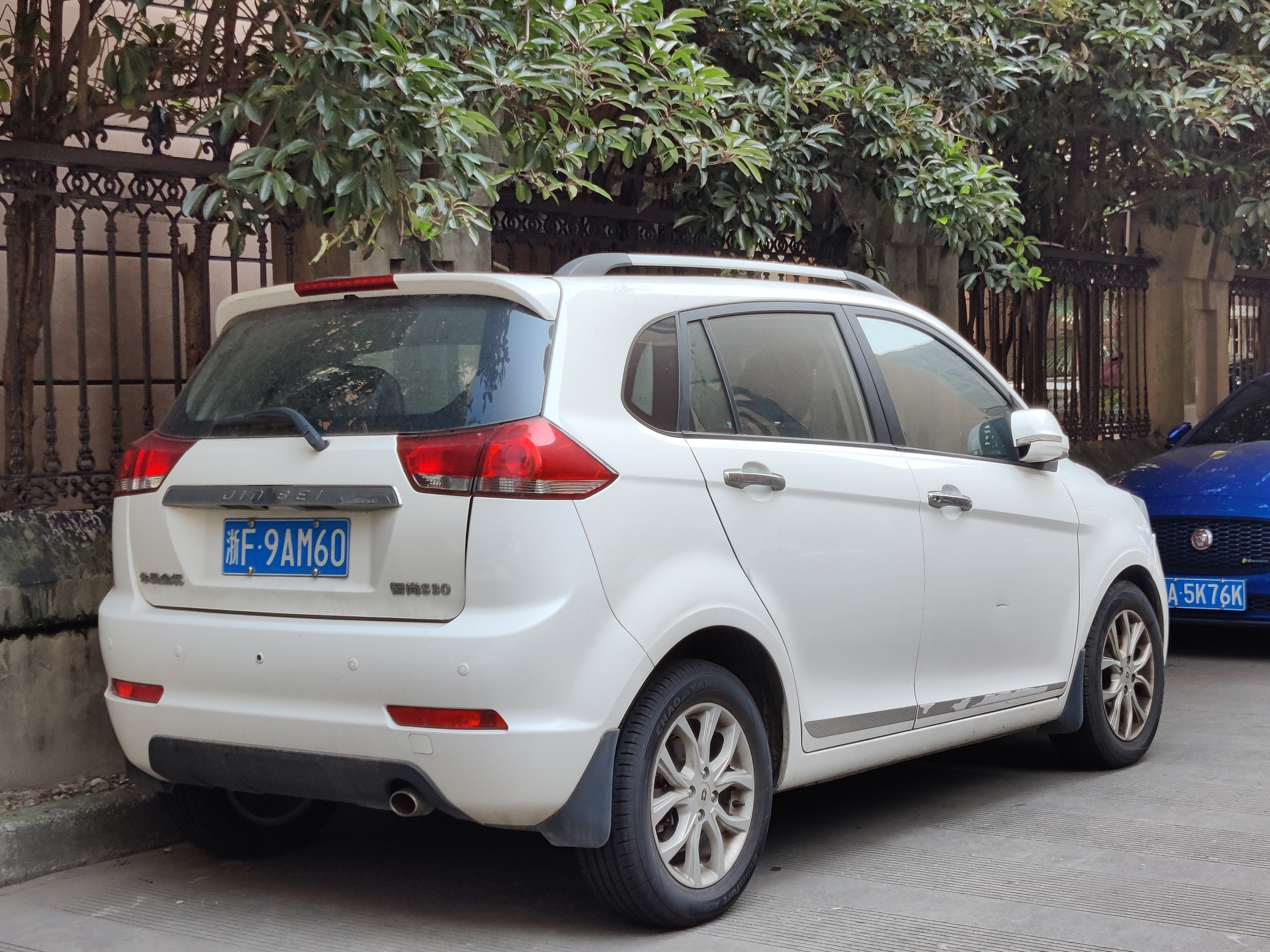
Post-facelift Jinbei S30 rear

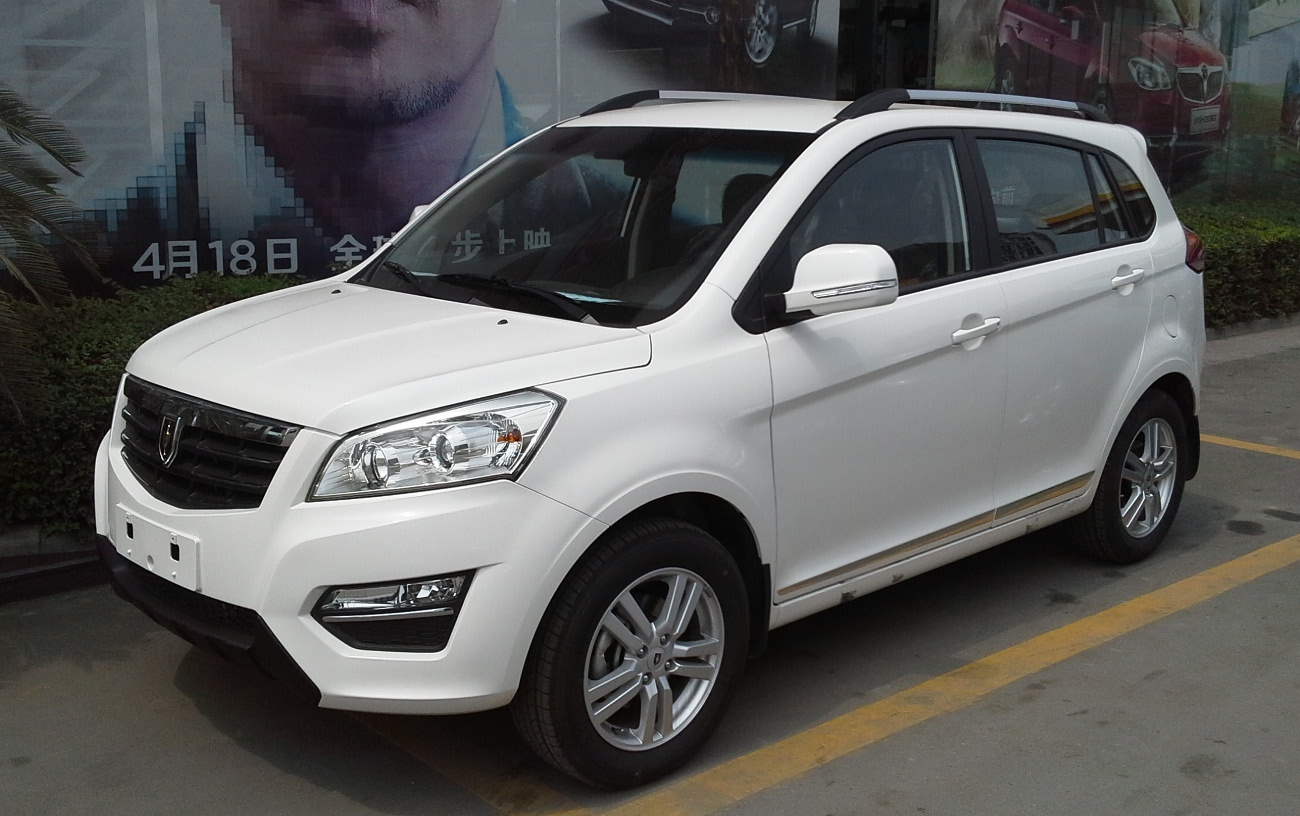
Pre-facelift Jinbei S30

The Jinbei S30 is Jinbei's first entry into the passenger vehicle market with most of its previous products being commercial vans and trucks. Prices of the Jinbei S30 ranges from 49,800 to 72,800 yuan.

=== Powertrain ===
The Jinbei S30 is powered by a 1.5 liter inline-4 engine developing 102 hp mated to a 5-speed manual transmission or a 5-speed automatic transmission.

== Jinbei S35 ==
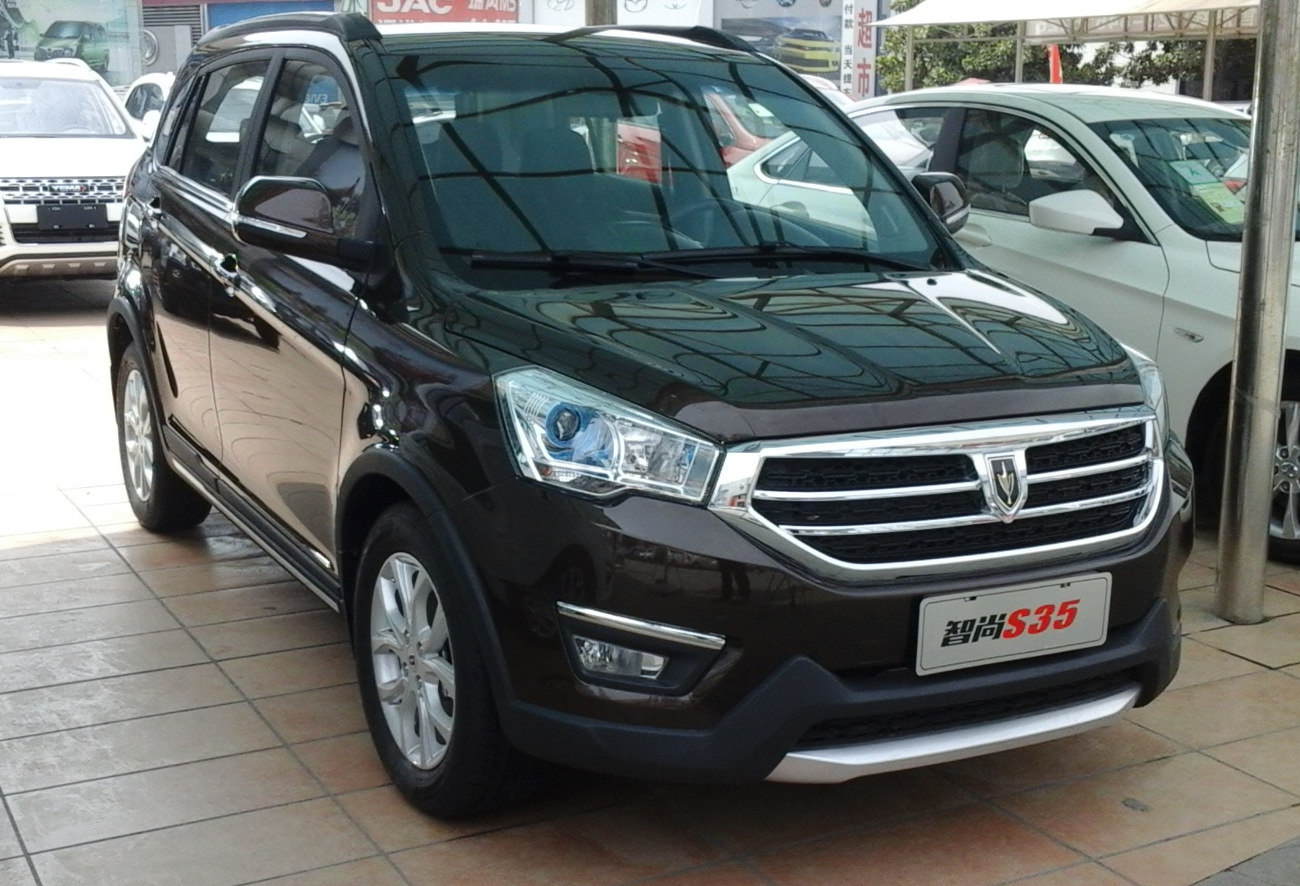
Jinbei S35

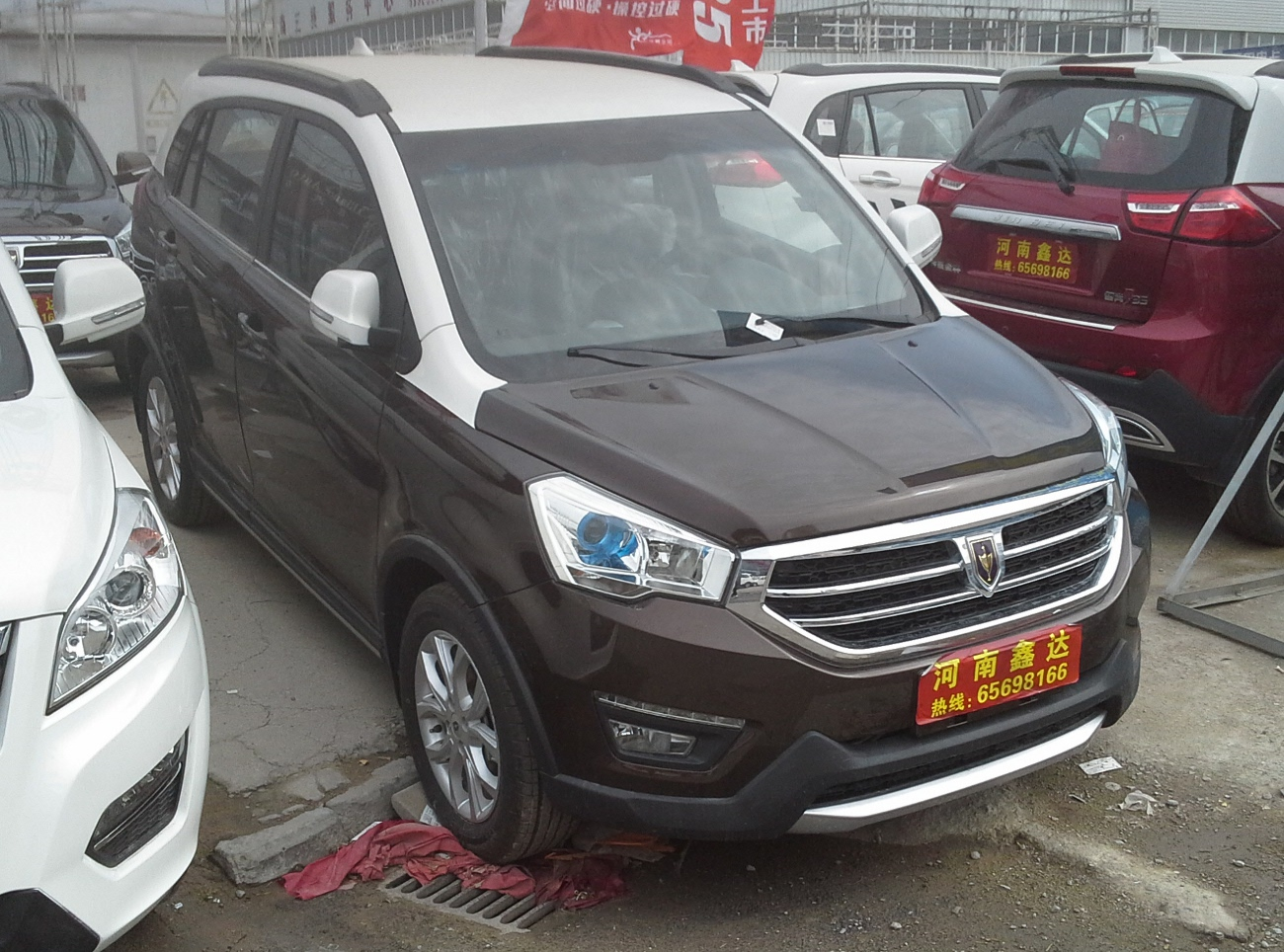
Jinbei S35 two tone front and rear

The Jinbei S35 or Jinbei Zhishang S35 debuted during the 2015 Chengdu Auto Show in China. The Jinbei S35 is an upmarket variant of the Brilliance Jinbei S30 launched in 2012, featuring a redesigned front fascia and tail lamps. Prices of the Jinbei S35 ranges from 59,800 to 78,800 yuan.
