= Foday Explorer =

The Foday Explorer is a series of compact and midsize SUVs manufactured from 2002 to 2017 by Foday. The Explorer SUV series was developed based on the platform of the Mitsubishi Pajero with designs heavily inspired by the first and second-generation Isuzu D-Max and Chevrolet Colorado. Due to Foday Explorer's business in automotive parts and stampings, the vehicle bodies of the Foday Explorer were also sold to several manufacturers as rebadged pickups and SUVs.

== Foday Explorer I/ Foday Explorer II/ Foday Explorer III ==
Foday Explorer I/ Foday Explorer II/ Foday Explorer III
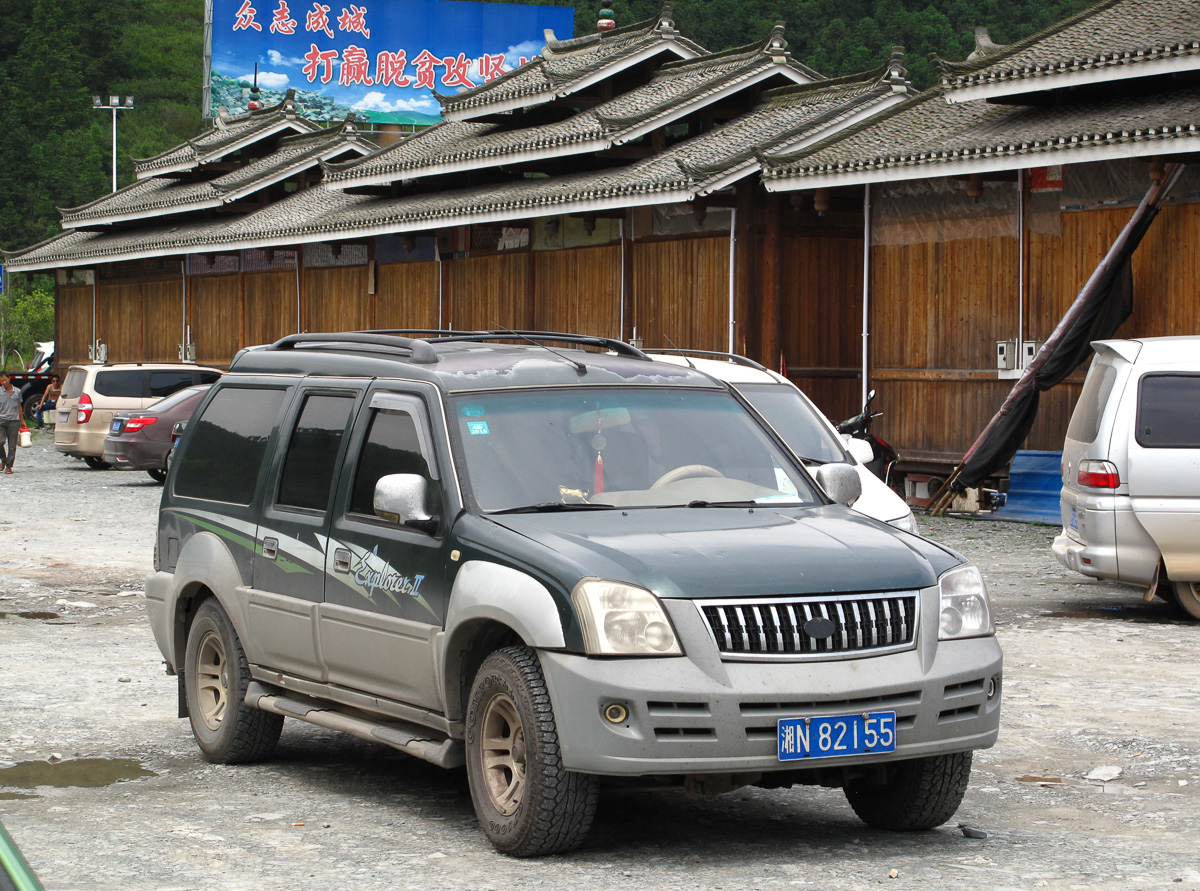

Overview
- Also called: Force One (sport utility vehicle)
- Production: 2002–2006
- Assembly: Foshan, Guangdong (Foday)

Body and chassis
- Related: Great Wall Wingle

Powertrain
- Engine: 2.0 L 4G63 I4; 2.2 L 491Q-ME I4; 2.4 L 4G69 I4; 1.9 L D19TCID1 turbo I4; 2.8 L BJ493ZQV1 turbo I4; 2.8 L 4B28TC/4D28TC I4; 2.8 L GW2.8TC I4
- Transmission: 5 speed manual

Dimensions
- Wheelbase: 3,025 mm (119.1 in)
- Length: 4,870–5,010 mm (191.7–197.2 in)
- Width: 1,770–1,780 mm (69.7–70.1 in)
- Height: 1,835–1,900 mm (72.2–74.8 in)
- Curb weight: 1750kg

The Foday Explorer I gasoline-powered "Luxury Trim" was launched in January 2002 with a price of 83,800 yuan. It is available as a 7-seater configuration and is equipped with a manual transmission and a rear wheel drive powertrain.

In January 2003 an additional "Ultra Luxury trim" was launched with a price of 91,800 yuan. An additional 2.2-litre naturally aspirated inline-4 engine option was added in 2004 codenamed "NHQ6480E". The engine develops a maximum 76 kW (102 hp; 103 PS) and 193 N⋅m (142 lb⋅ft; 19.7 kg⋅m). As of 2006, a 2.8-litre Turbo Diesel inline-4 engine was added and was mated to a 5-speed manual transmission. The diesel engine develops a maximum 67 kW (90 hp; 91 PS) and 204.5 N⋅m (20.85 kg⋅m; 150.8 lb⋅ft).

The Foday Explorer II was launched in 2005, and was developed with the cooperation of The Hong Kong Polytechnic University as an updated version of the Explorer I. The engine is a 2.2-litre inline-4 engine developing 103 hp (77 kW; 104 PS) mated to a 5-speed manual transmission.

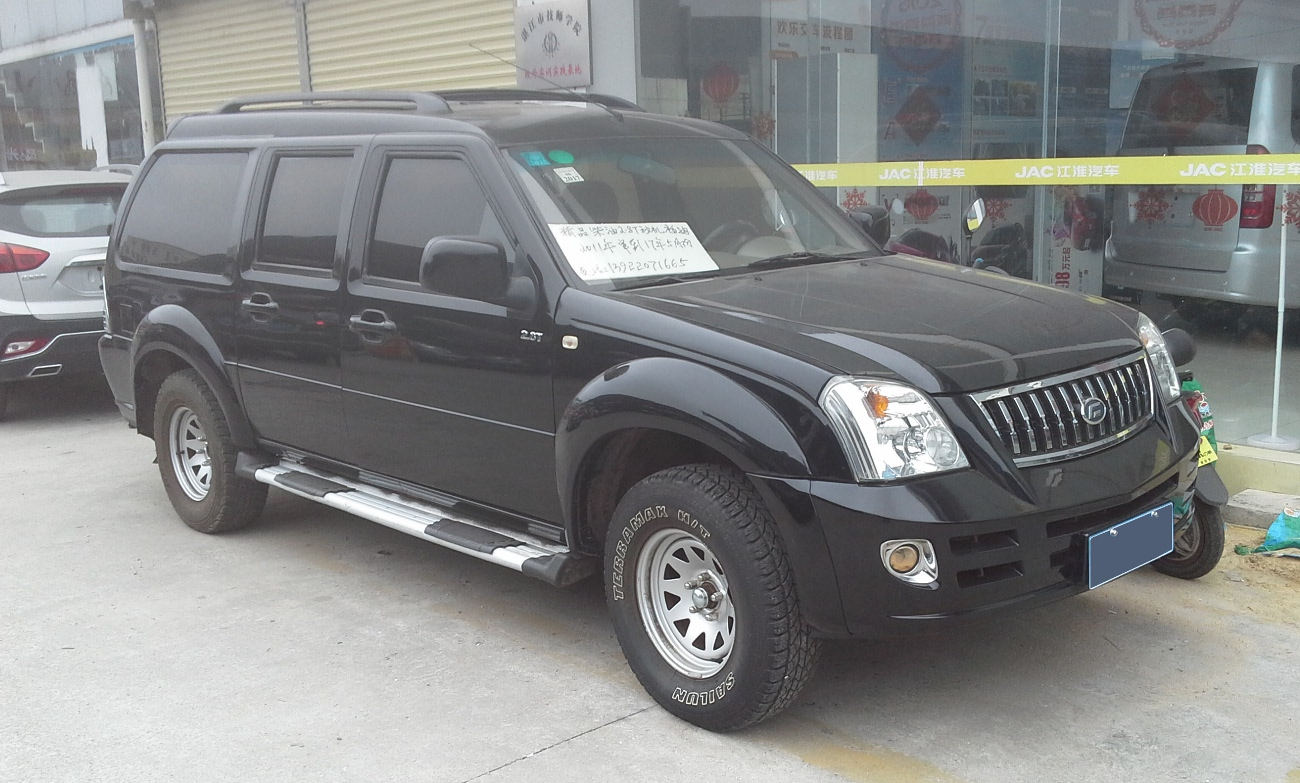
Foday Explorer II (front)

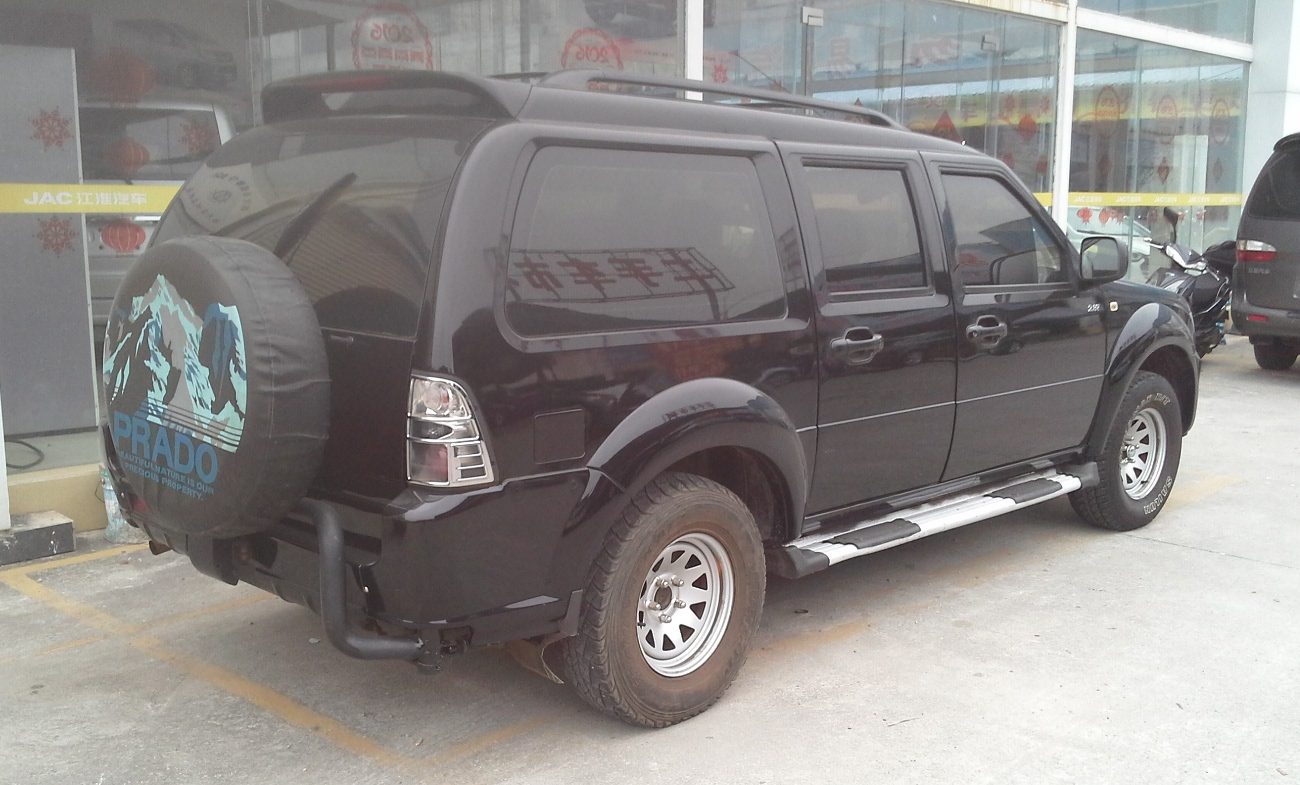
Foday Explorer II (rear)

In February 2006, the Explorer III was launched. The Explorer III is equipped with a JX493QZ3 Isuzu-sourced turbo diesel engine while still being built on the Mitsubishi-sourced platform. The engine develops a maximum 68 kW (91 hp; 92 PS) at 3600 rpm and a maximum torque of 210 N⋅m (150 lb⋅ft; 21 kg⋅m) at 2300 rpm. The fuel economy is 6.5 L/100 km (43 mpg_{‑imp}; 36 mpg_{‑US}).

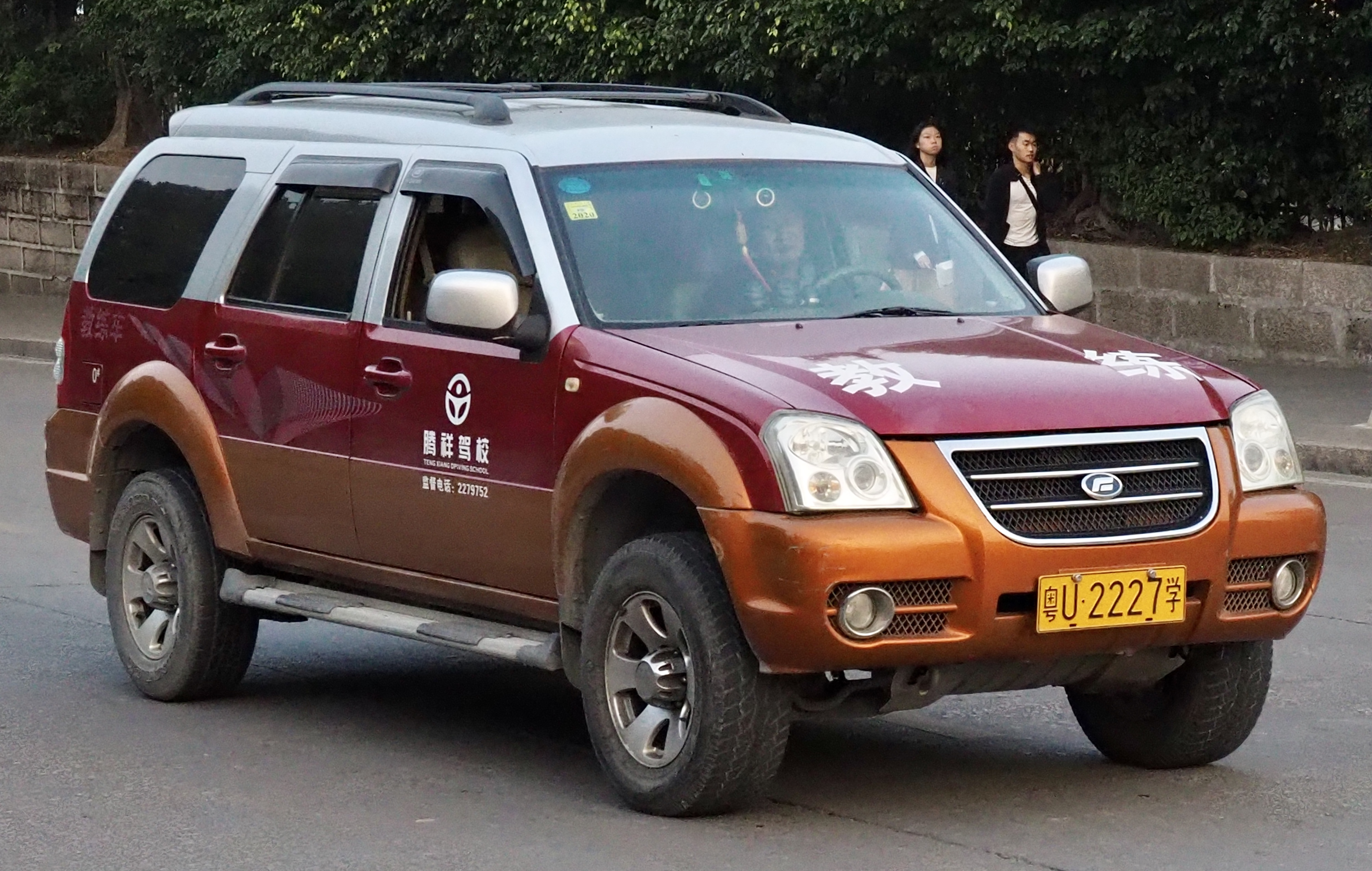
Foday Explorer III

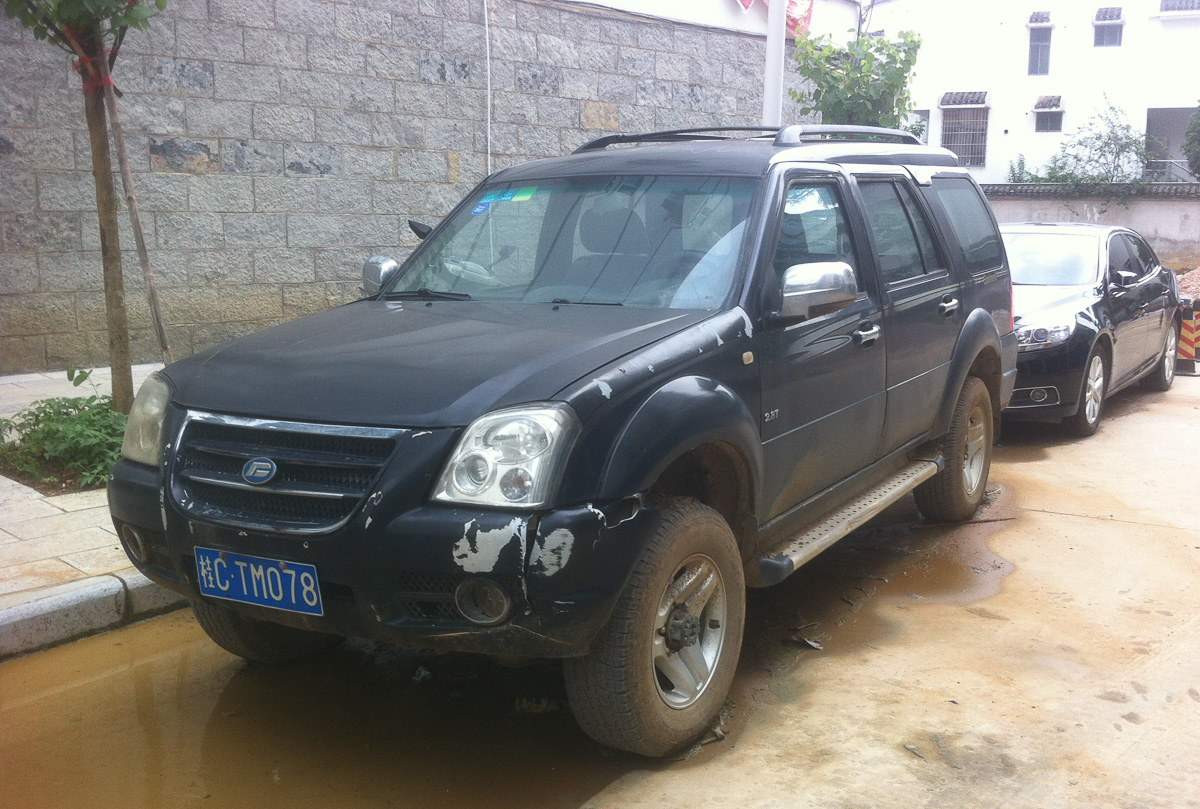
Foday Explorer III

== Foday Explorer 6 ==
Foday Explorer 6
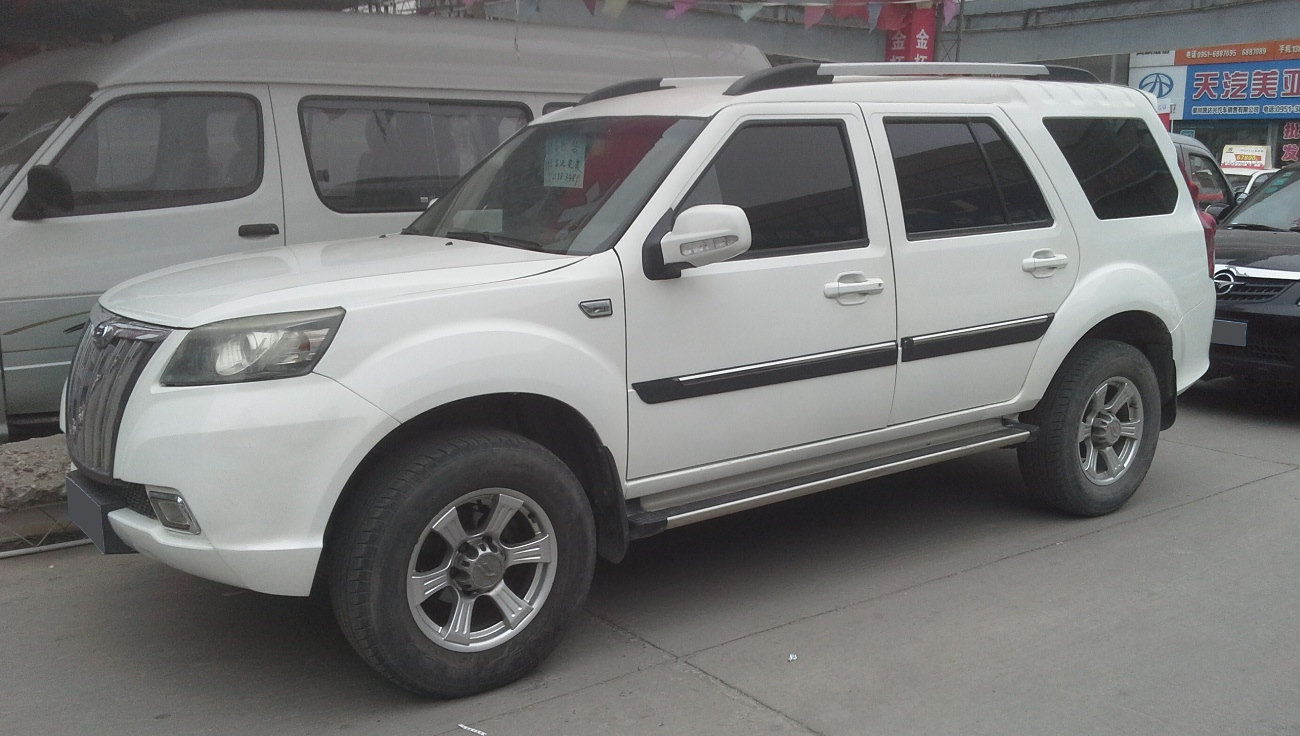

Overview
- Also called: Golden Dragon Righto V3; Kantanka Nkunimdie (Ghana)
- Production: 2006–2017
- Assembly: Foshan, Guangdong (Foday) Ghana

Powertrain
- Engine: 2.0 L 4G63 I4; 2.2 L 491Q-ME I4; 2.4 L 4G69 I4; 1.9 L D19TCID1 turbo I4; 2.8 L BJ493ZQV1 turbo I4; 2.8 L 4B28TC/4D28TC I4; 2.8 L GW2.8TC diesel I4
- Transmission: 5 speed manual

Dimensions
- Wheelbase: 3,000–3,025 mm (118.1–119.1 in)
- Length: 4,885–5,010 mm (192.3–197.2 in)
- Width: 1,780–1,785 mm (70.1–70.3 in)
- Height: 1,900–1,920 mm (74.8–75.6 in)
- Curb weight: 1750kg

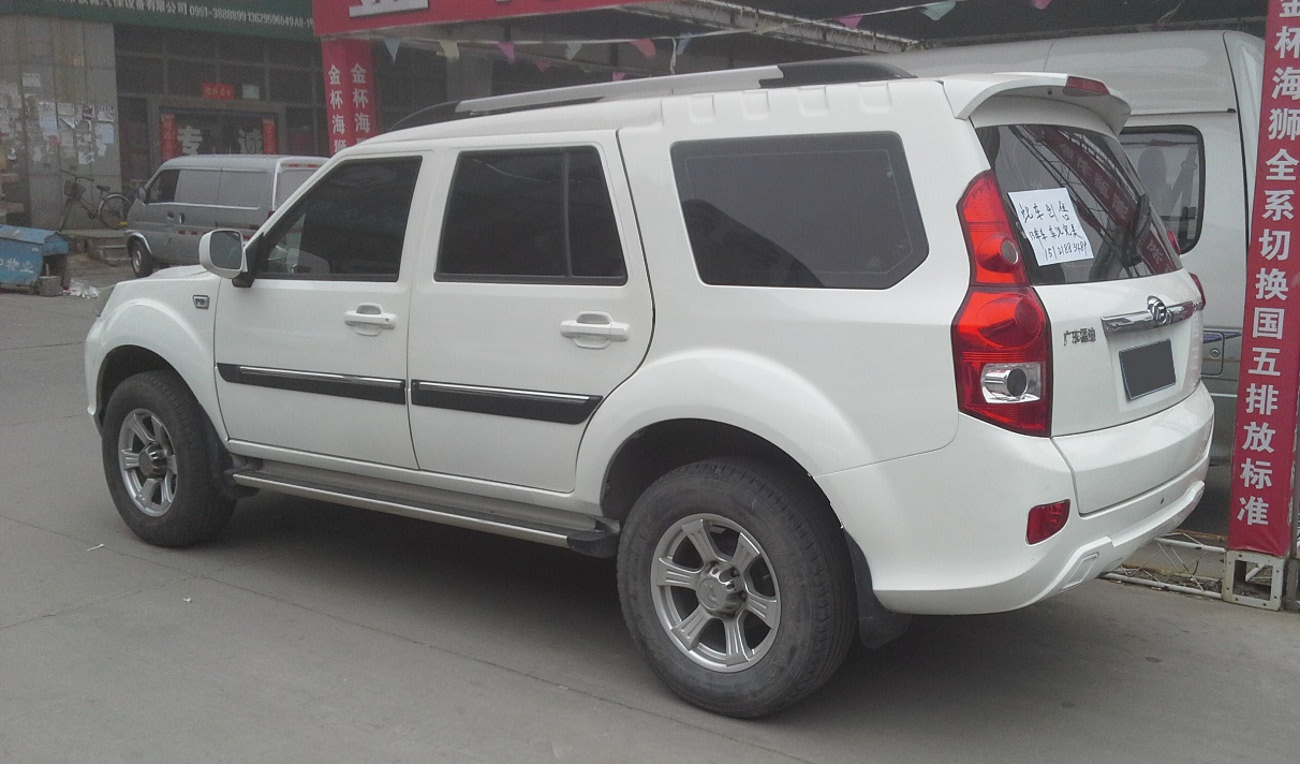
Foday Explorer 6 rear

A major facelift was conducted for the Foday Explorer series called the Explorer 6, changing the design of the front and rear of the SUV massively, with the platform still being based on the Mitsubishi design.

=== Powertrain ===
The entry level Explorer 6 is powered by a 2.0-litre, 120 PS (88 kW; 118 hp) petrol engine and a price tag of 89,800 yuan. A JMC-sourced JX493QZ3 diesel engine was also available developing 92 PS (68 kW; 91 hp) at 3600 rpm and 20.8 kg⋅m (204 N⋅m; 150 lb⋅ft) of torque at 2300 rpm.

=== Golden Dragon Righto V3 ===
The Golden Dragon Righto V3 (锐度) SUV is a rebadged version of the Foday Explorer 6 produced by Golden Dragon. The Righto V3 debuted in May 2013 on a bus show in Fuzhou, Fujian Province. The Chinese name of the Righto V3 is Ruidu V3. The manufacturer, Golden Dragon or Xiamen Golden Dragon Bus is from Xiamen in Fujian Province, and is a subsidiary of King Long United Automotive Industry Corporation from Xiamen.

Golden Dragon and Foday have a license-agreement for the Righto V3 with Foday producing the base-car with chassis and bodywork, and shipping it to Golden Dragon for final assembly. Engine of the Righto V3 is a 102 PS (75 kW; 101 hp) 2.0-litre petrol engine and the same 95 PS (70 kW; 94 hp) 2.8-litre diesel engine shared by the Foday Explorer 6. Gearbox of the Righto V3 is a 5-speed manual transmission.

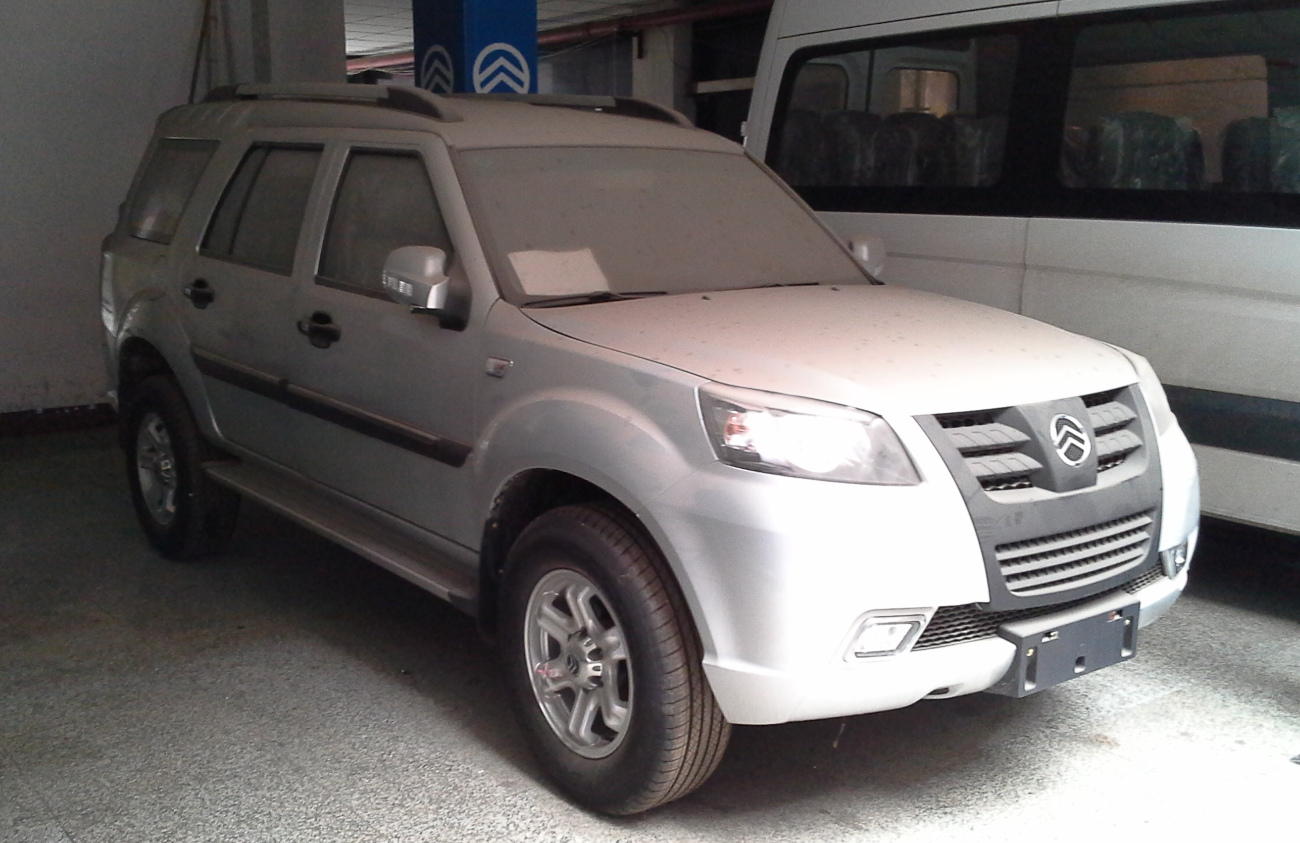
Golden Dragon Righto V3
