= Foday Lion F22 =

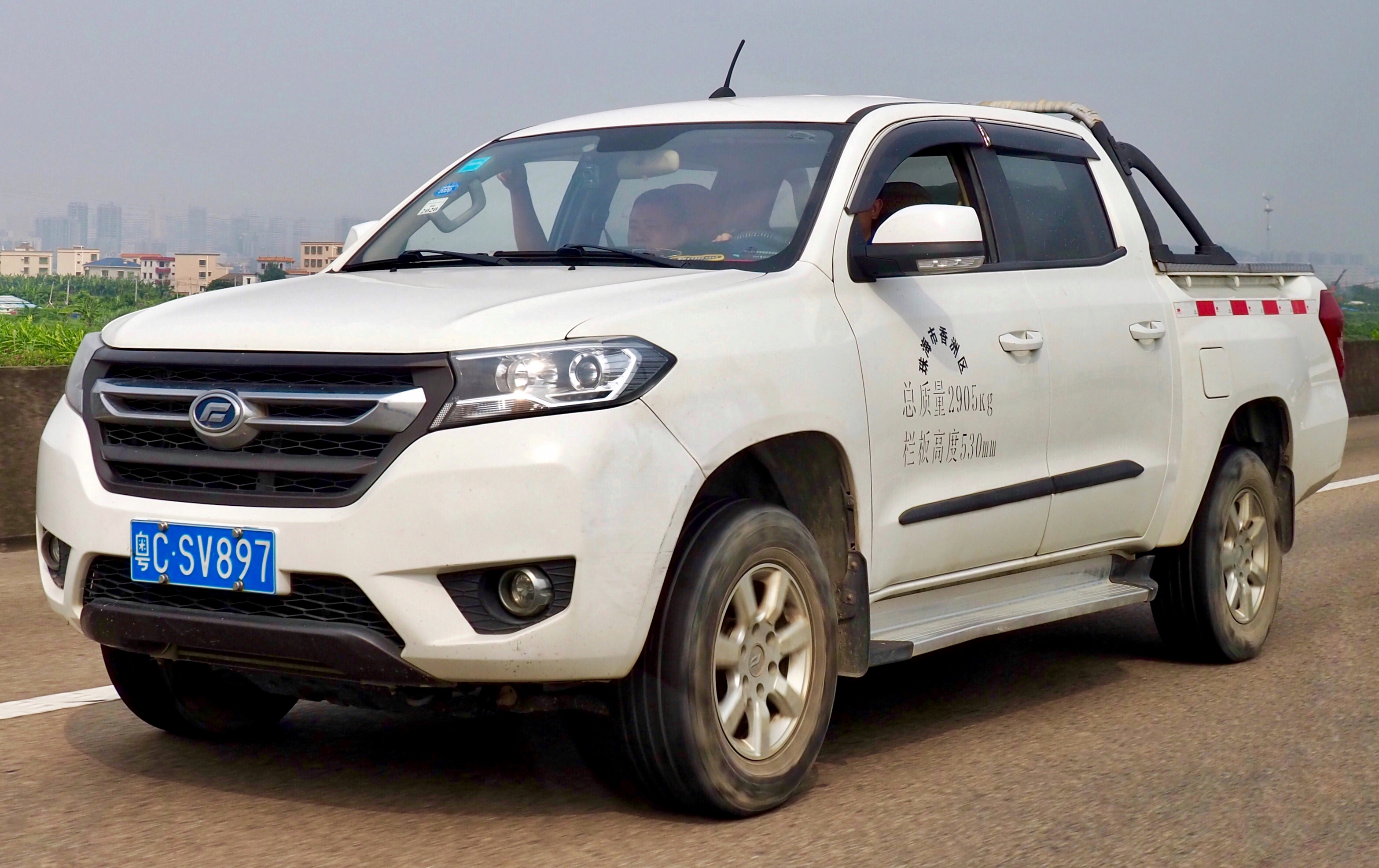

Overview
- Manufacturer: Foday
- Also called: Dongfeng Yufeng P16; Dayun V5; SAF Striker; Keyton 7 King Long Venus 3/Dracon (Electric version in Thailand); Qiteng Dragon 7 NEX EV Pickup Truck (Electric version in Thailand); Sandstorm S24; Innoson G6C (Nigeria); Kantanka Omama Luxury (Ghana); MaxMotor Kalut (Iran); Zamyad Zagros (Iran); Kandi K32 (Electric version in US); TAM Vika T2
- Production: 2015–present
- Model years: 2019–present
- Assembly: China: Foshan, Guangdong; Malaysia: Tampoi, Johor (EKA); Thailand: Bang Phli, Samut Prakarn (Nex Point; for NEX EV Pickup); USA: Dallas, TX (Kandi America; for Kandi K32)

Body and chassis
- Class: Mid-size pickup truck
- Body style: Four-door double cab
- Layout: ICE; Front-engine, rear-wheel drive or four-wheel drive; Electric; Rear-motor, rear-wheel-drive or Dual-motor, all-wheel-drive
- Related: Foday Landfort

Powertrain
- Engine: Petrol: 2.4 L Mitsubishi 4G69S4N I4; Diesel: 1.9 L T19TCIE2 turbo I4
- Transmission: 5-speed manual 6-speed automatic

Dimensions
- Wheelbase: 3,100–3,500 mm (120–140 in)
- Length: 5,219–5,730 mm (205.5–225.6 in)
- Width: 1,870 mm (74 in)
- Height: 1,844–1,864 mm (72.6–73.4 in)

The Foday Lion F22 (Chinese: 雄狮F22) is a mid-size pickup truck that is manufactured and sold by Foday. It is based on the same platform as the Foday Landfort SUV and was rebadged as the SAF Striker, Dongfeng Yufeng P16 and Dayun Pika. An electric version called the Kandi K32 was produced by Kandi Technologies from November 2021 for the North American market.

== Overview ==
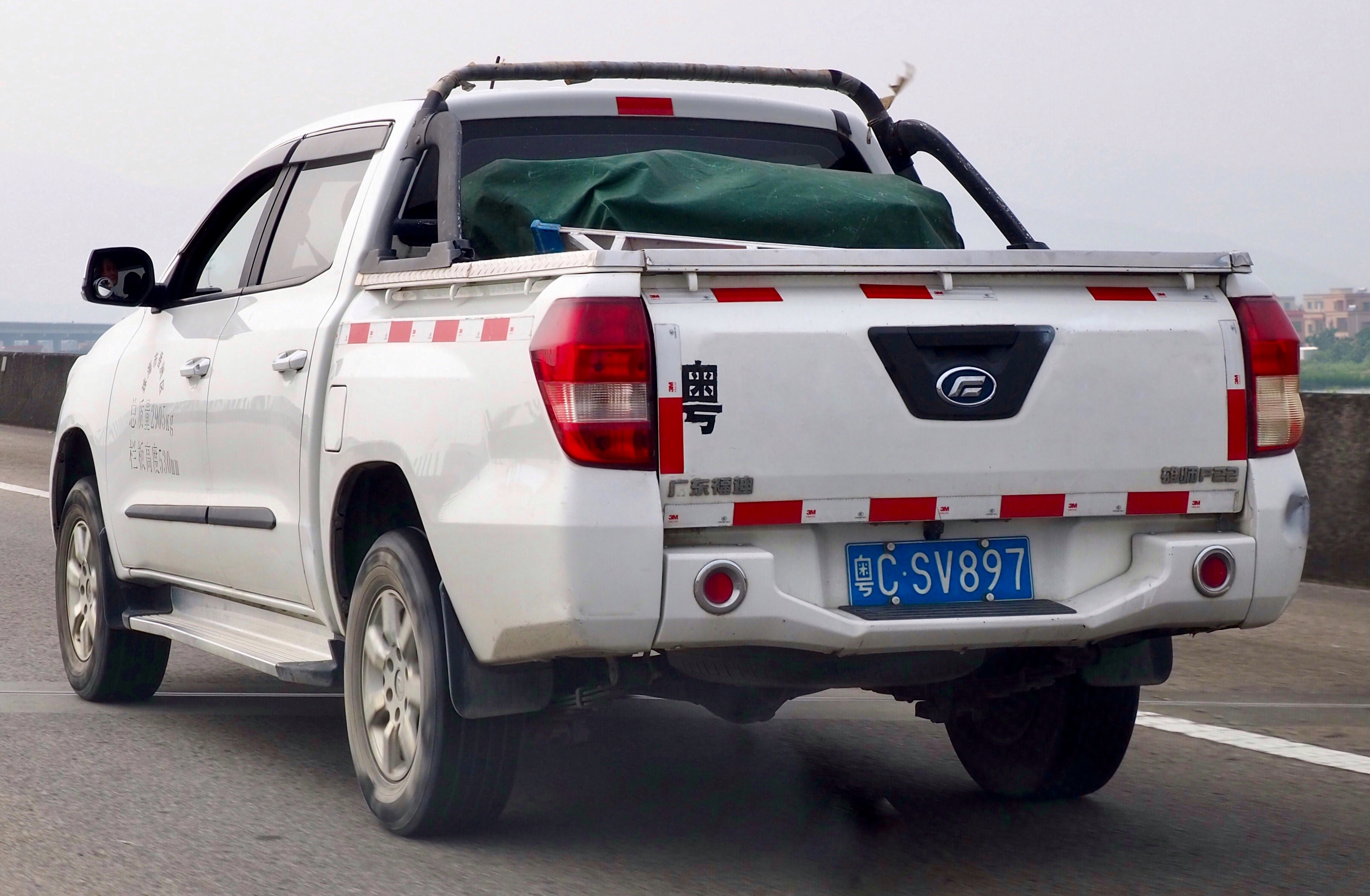
2017 Guangdong Foday Xiongshi F22 (rear)

The Foday Lion F22 was launched on the Chinese market in the second quarter of 2015 as a crew-cab only pickup. Additional models of the Foday Lion F22 featuring a transmission supplied by Punch Powerglide was launched in April 2018 with pre-production started in March 2018.

=== Powertrain ===
There are three engines available for the Foday Pickup Lion F22, same as the engines offered for the Landfort. A Mitsubishi-sourced 2.4-litre petrol engine with 136 hp (101 kW; 138 PS) and 200 N⋅m (148 lb⋅ft), and a 1.9-litre turbodiesel engine with 136 hp (101 kW; 138 PS) and 300 N⋅m (221 lb⋅ft). Both engines are mated to a five-speed manual transmission with rear-wheel drive as standard and optional four-wheel drive.

As of 2018 a Diesel 1.9-litre turbo engine with 150 hp (110 kW; 150 PS) and 350 N⋅m (258 lb⋅ft) torque is added to the lineup, available with a manual transmission and with Punch Powerglide's 6L50 6-speed automatic transmission.

In Malaysia, a Mitsubishi-derived 4G69S4N 2.4 litre petrol engine is available, delivering 134 hp (100 kW; 136 PS) at 5,250 rpm and 200 N⋅m (148 lb⋅ft) of torque from 2,500 to 3,000 rpm. A five-speed manual transmission and six-speed automatic transmission is available, with four-wheel drive offered as standard.

== Markets ==
=== Malaysia ===
Enggang Keramat Automobile in Malaysia launched a Malaysian car brand called SAF in April 2016. SAF was named after the arrangement of Muslims in prayer. The SAF lineup consists of rebadged versions of models from Foday, with the Lion F22 pick-up truck rebadged as the SAF Striker while still looking identical to the Foday model. The Foday Lion F22 was built at Oriental Assemblers in Tampoi, Johor, the same company that also assembles Chery products in Malaysia.

=== United States ===
Kandi America, the US subsidiary of China's Kandi Technologies Group, introduced the K32 as its first all-wheel-drive off-road EV in November 2021. The Kandi K32 is based on the same vehicle body as the Foday Lion F22, and was marketed as an all-electric dual motor 4-wheel drive UTV. The base Standard Range trim model is available with a 20.7 kWh battery capable of 60 miles (97 km) of range, while the Long Range variant comes with a 50 kWh pack for up to 150 miles (240 km) of range. Both models are equipped with a dual-motor, all-wheel-drive powertrain an output of 21 kW (28 hp; 29 PS) according to Kandi.
