= GW2.8TC =

The GW2.8TC is an engine developed and built by Great Wall Motor in China with cooperation from Bosch. It is a four-stroke common rail diesel engine that produces 70 kW (94 hp) at 3600 rpm and 225 N⋅m (166 lb⋅ft) at 2600 rpm. It is used in the Great Wall Hovercraft and the Great Wall Wingle. It is also China's first high-pressure common rail diesel engine.
