= Foday =

Chinese automotive manufacturing company

Guangdong Foday Automobile Co., Ltd.
- Trade name: Foday
- Industry: Automotive
- Predecessor: Guangdong Fudi Automobile Co., Ltd.
- Founded: 1988; 38 years ago
- Fate: Acquired by XPeng
- Headquarters: Foshan, Guangdong, China
- Products: Automobiles
- Website: http://www.fdqc.com

Guangdong Foday Automobile Co., Ltd., trading as Foday, is an automotive manufacturing company based in Guangdong, China. With roots going back to 1988, it used to be known as Nanhai Automobile. Its principal products are vehicles, primarily pick-up trucks and SUVs, automotive parts and stampings. Its products have been sold in various countries under the Fudi and Foday brands.

== History ==
In the late 1970s and '80s, the Nanhai District in Foshan, Guangdong province, China, saw the emergence of a fledgling car industry. Among the nascent enterprises was the Nanhai Automobile factory, founded in 1988, which initially thrived under the auspices of a deal with Nanjing Automobile to assemble truck bodies. However, mismanagement and economic stagnation in the late 1990s led to the factory's downturn, culminating in significant losses by 1999.

Facing financial turmoil, the factory underwent a management buy-out led by Ye Qing, its general manager. Ye orchestrated a deal with the provincial government, which took on the factory's debt while Ye acquired its intangible assets under the condition of retaining its workforce. With backing from key partners like BAIC Foton and Lanshi Machinery Factory, Ye rebranded the company as Nanhai Foday Automobile in 2001, and shortly after as Guangdong Foday Automobile.

Recognizing the growth potential in the pickup market, Foday acquired molds for a 1991 Isuzu pickup, subsequently updating the design to suit contemporary preferences. This move propelled Foday into prominence, and in the early 2000s attracted the attention of Wei Jianjun, owner of Great Wall Motors. A partnership ensued, leading to the integration of Foday bodies into Great Wall's lineup, marking a significant milestone in Foday's history.

Expanding beyond pickups, Foday capitalized on its success by venturing into SUV production. Leveraging its existing molds, the company introduced SUV variants, capitalizing on the burgeoning demand for affordable SUVs in China. The early 2000s saw Foday's expansion into complete vehicle assembly, with models like the Little Superman pickup and Explorer SUV gaining traction in the market. However, challenges arose with the advent of stricter emission standards and increasing competition. Undeterred, Foday embarked on Project F128 in 2010, a comprehensive effort to design and produce new pickup and SUV bodies. Despite substantial investment and the launch of the Landfort SUV and Lion F22 pickup, sales fell short of expectations due to pricing issues and regulatory hurdles.

Financial difficulties mounted, prompting Foday to acquire a new energy vehicle manufacturing license in order to attract investment. The strategy paid off and after choosing from multiple suitors Foday was acquired by Xpeng in 2020. While Xpeng eventually divested Foday's manufacturing business, the revitalized company returned to profitability in 2020, focusing on its core competency of body stamping.

== Products ==
- Foday Explorer ll SUV
- Foday Explorer III SUV
- Foday Landfort SUV
- Foday Explorer 6 SUV; launched October 2010;
- Foday Lion pickup
- Foday Lion F16 pickup
- Foday Lion F22 pickup
- Foday Little Superman pickup

== Product Gallery ==
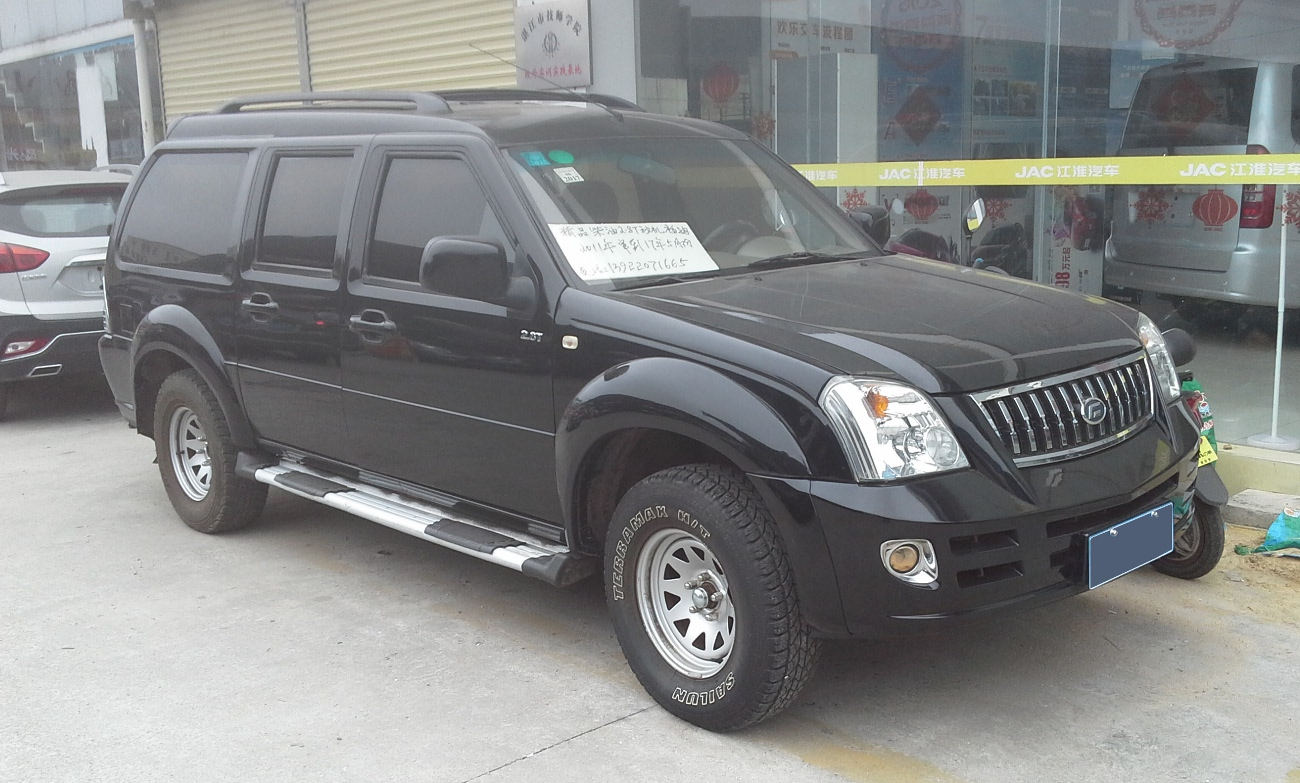
Foday Explorer II

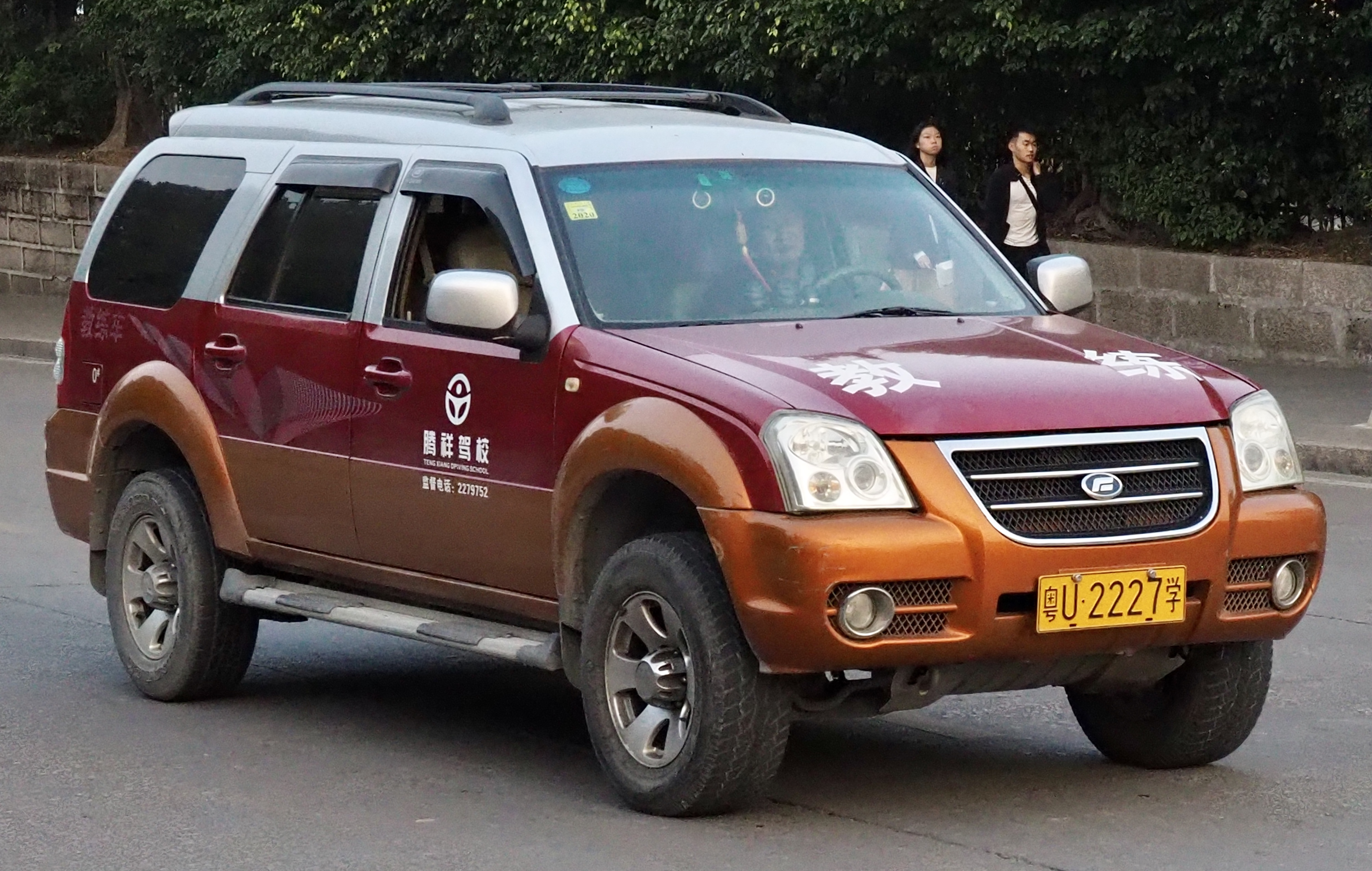
Foday Explorer III

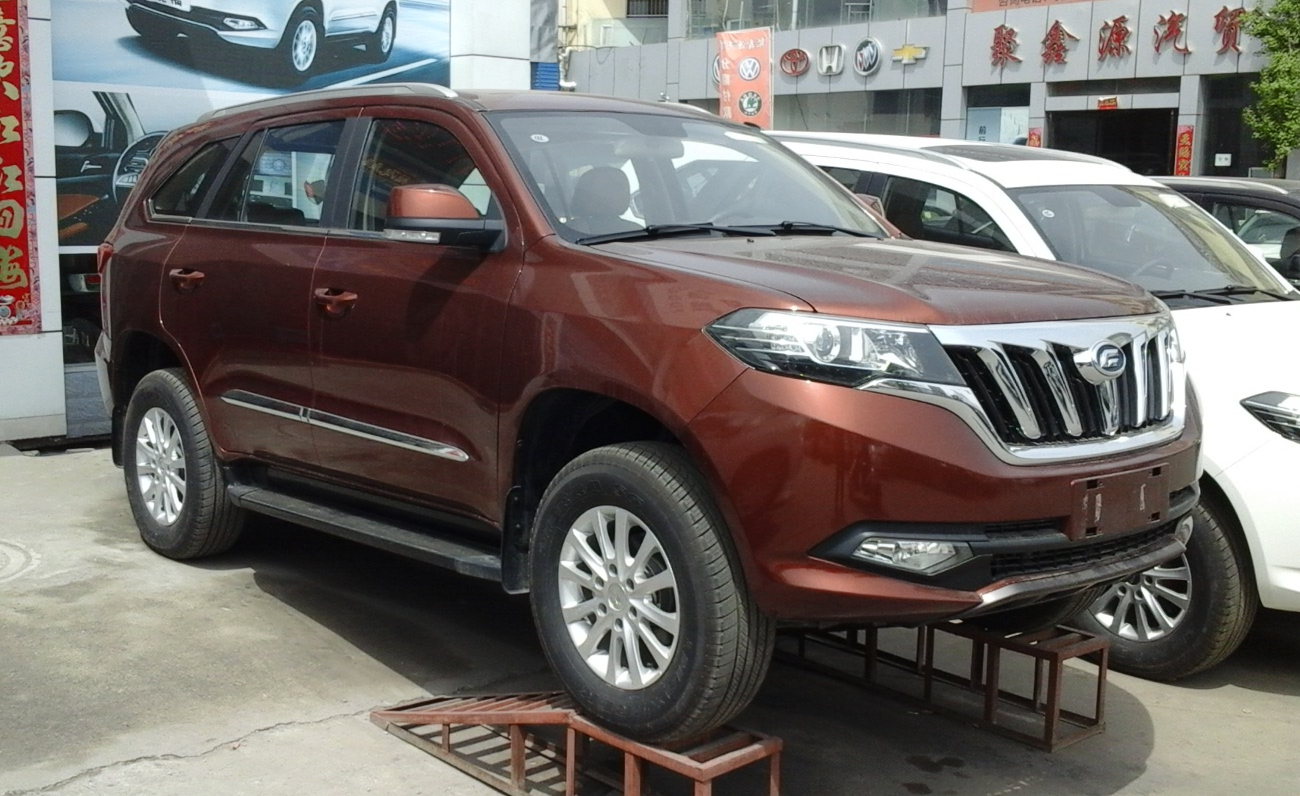
Foday Landfort

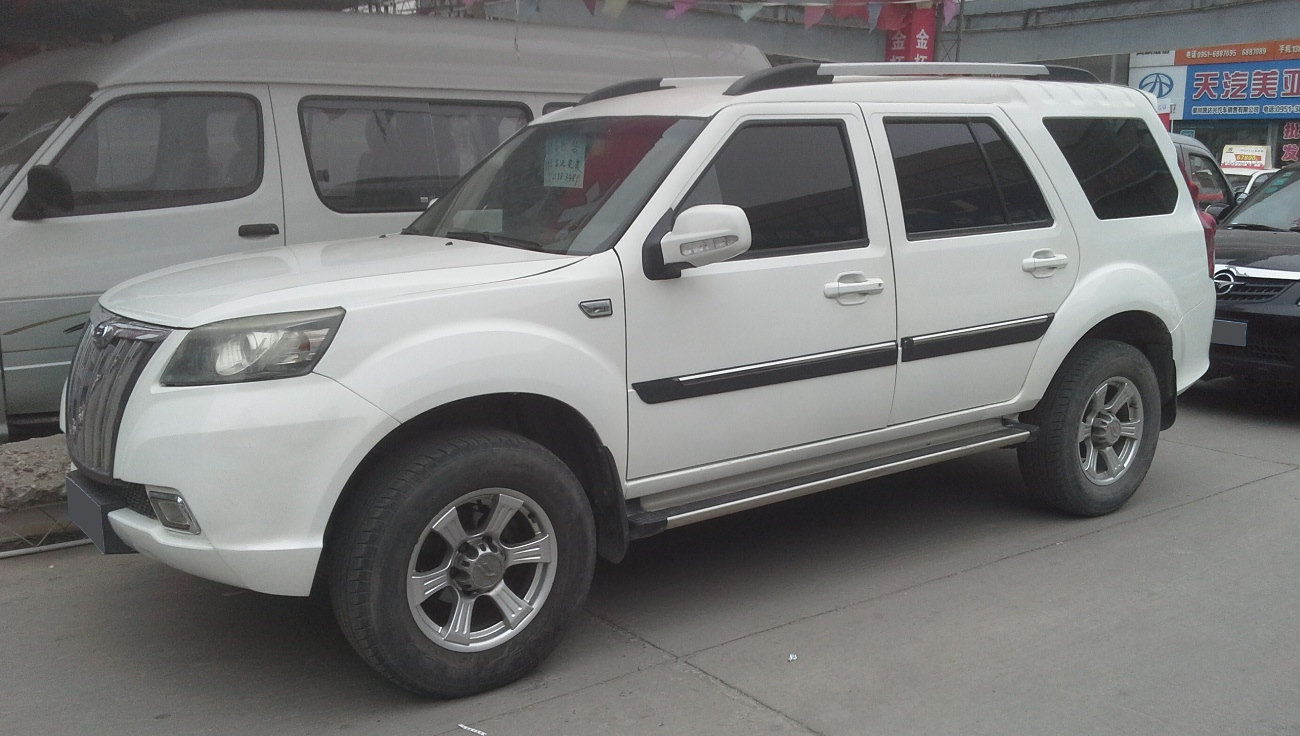
Foday Explorer 6

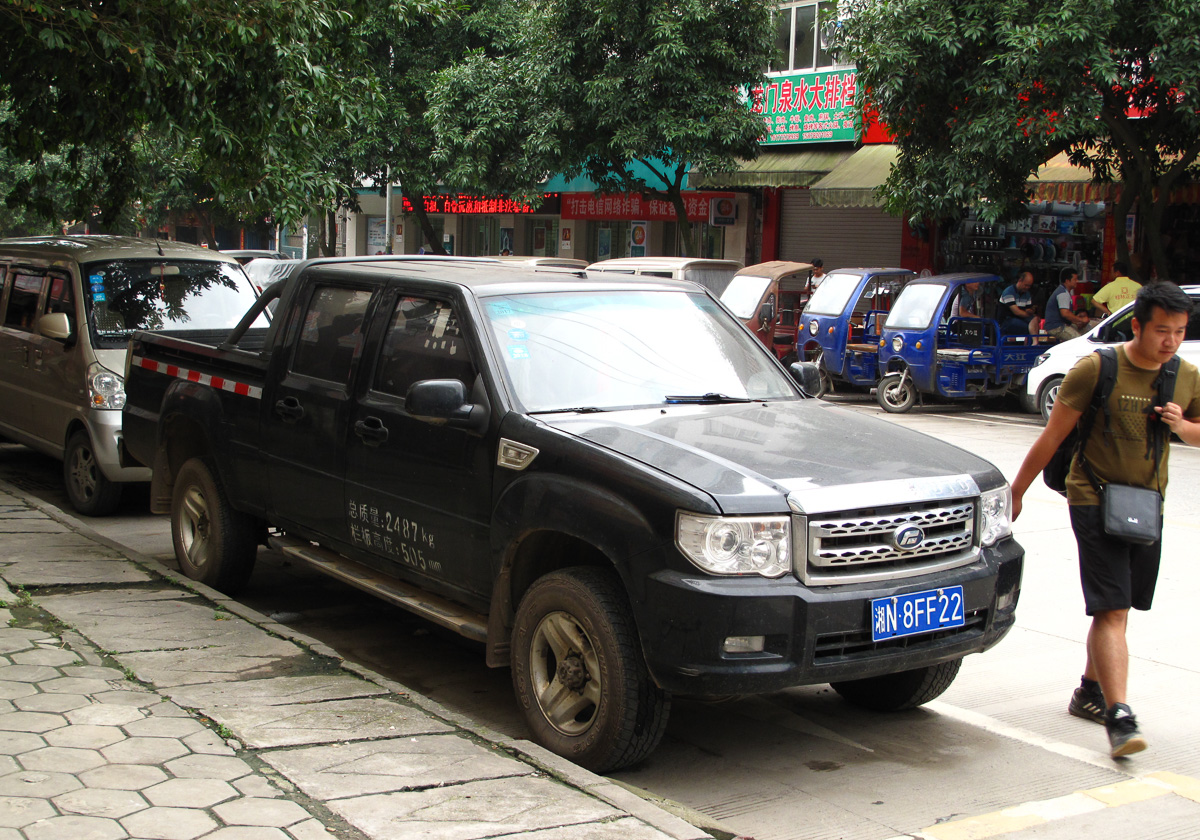
Foday Lion F16 pickup

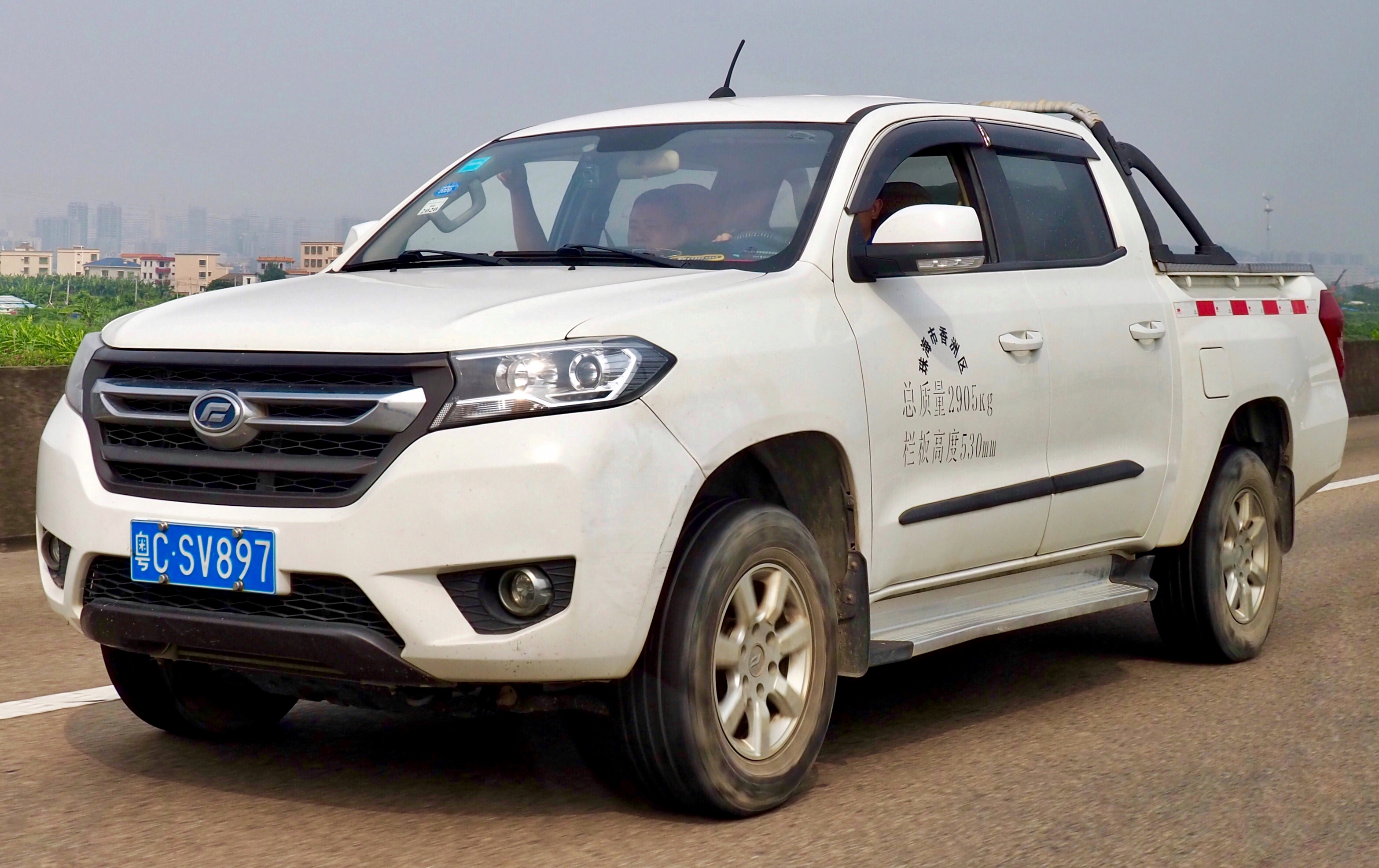
Foday Lion F22 pickup

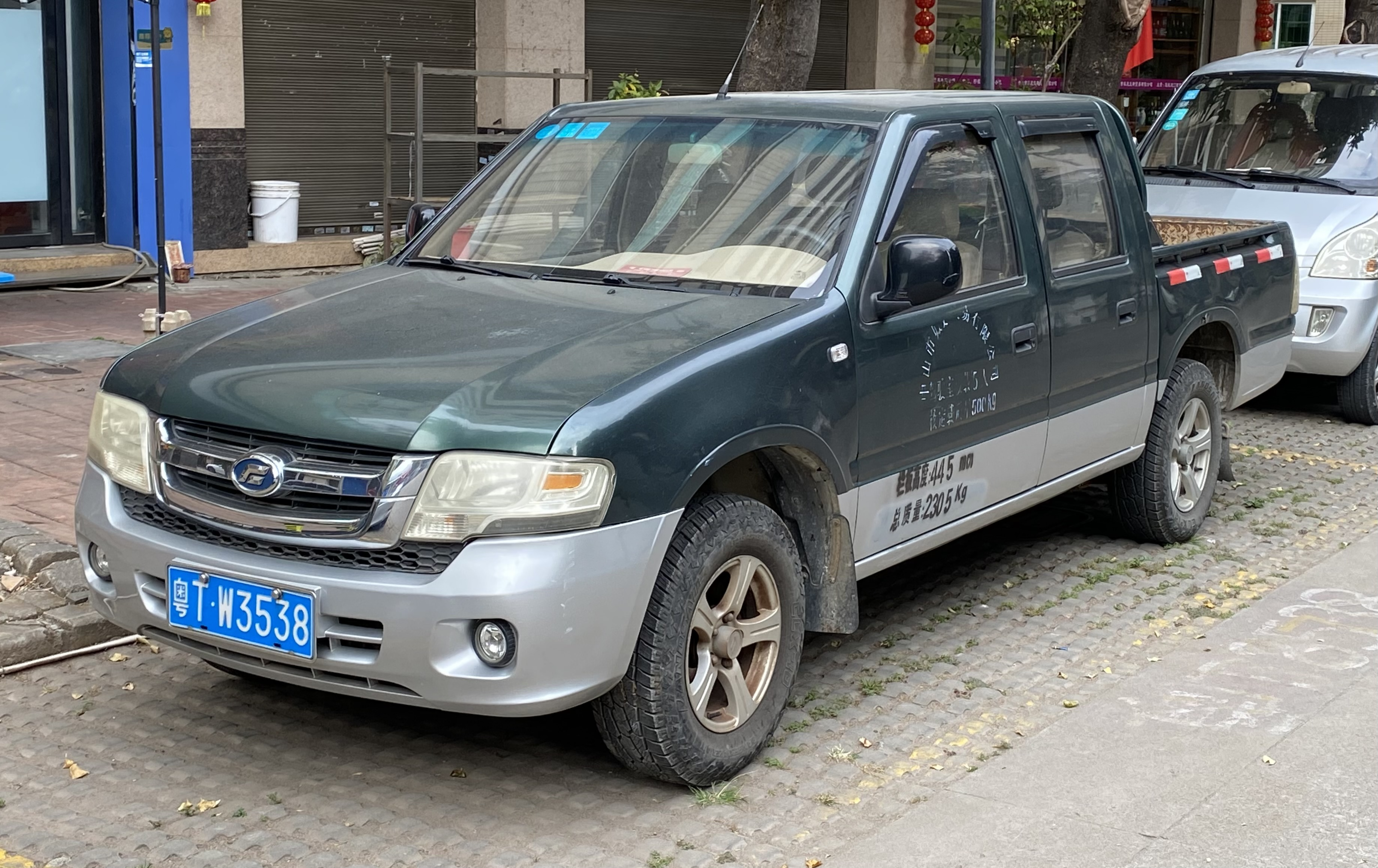
Foday Little Superman
