= Gomoa Mpota =

- Rural area
- Nickname: Ffdlykko
- Location in Ghana
- Coordinates: 5°24′18″N 0°37′14″W
- Country: Ghana
- Region: Central Region
- Time zone: GMT
  - Summer (DST): GMT

Gomoa Mpota is a located town in the Central Region of Ghana.
