= TJI =

TJI may refer to:

- Tucson Jazz Institute, Jazz School in Tucson, Arizona
- TJ Innova Engineering & Technology, Chinese automotive design company
- Transitional Justice Institute, Ulster University, Northern Ireland
- Trujillo Airport, Colón Department, Honduras (IATA code: TJI)

Tji may refer to:

- Northern Tujia language, Sino-Tibetan language of China (ISO 639-3 code: tji)
- Tji, a unit of weight equal to 3.8601 kg; see Indonesian units of measurement
- TJI joist, a construction framing component (trademarked by Weyerhaeuser) for I-joist

People with the surname Tji include:

- Daniel Tji Hak Soun, South Korean Roman Catholic priest
