= Ora White Cat =

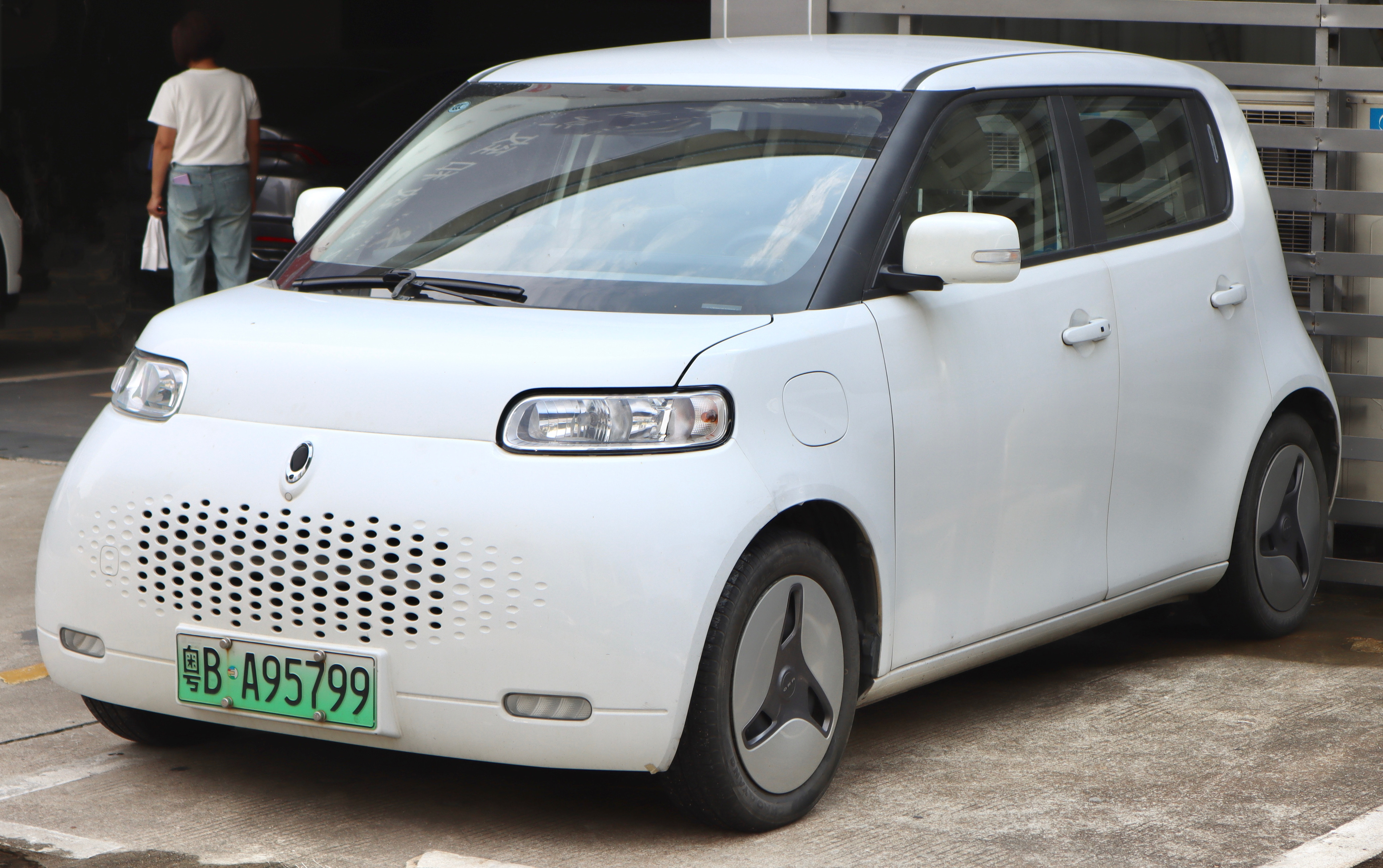

Overview
- Manufacturer: Great Wall Motors
- Also called: Ora R2 (2020)
- Production: 2020–2022
- Assembly: China: Taizhou (GWM Taizhou Smart Factory)

Body and chassis
- Class: City car (A)
- Body style: 5-door hatchback
- Layout: Front-motor, front-wheel-drive

Powertrain
- Electric motor: 35 kW (48 PS; 47 bhp) Permanent magnet motor 45 kW (61 PS; 60 bhp) Permanent magnet motor
- Battery: 34 kWh lithium polymer (LMP) battery 38 kWh lithium polymer (LMP) battery

Dimensions
- Wheelbase: 2,490 mm (98.0 in)
- Length: 3,625 mm (142.7 in)
- Width: 1,660 mm (65.4 in)
- Height: 1,530 mm (60.2 in)

Chronology
- Predecessor: Great Wall Peri

The Ora White Cat (Chinese: 欧拉白猫; pinyin: Ōulā BáiMāo) also known as the R2 is a battery electric city car produced by the Chinese car manufacturer Great Wall Motors under its electric vehicle brand Ora from 2020 to 2022.

== History ==
In June 2019, Ora presented the R2 EV Concept study as a preview of the third model in the production line of vehicles of this subsidiary of Great Wall Motors. The car was characterized as a more comfortable alternative to the budget model R1. At the rear, there is a glass pane optically forming one part with a strip of LED lamps running across the width of the body, supplemented by additional lamps in the bumper.

The model was formally released on July 15, 2020, and renamed the White Cat for production. The car found the most buyers, 20.6 thousand, in 2021. Its production ended in February 2022 due to a change in model policy, in which the manufacturer withdrew from loss-making cheap models in favor of larger and more expensive designs.

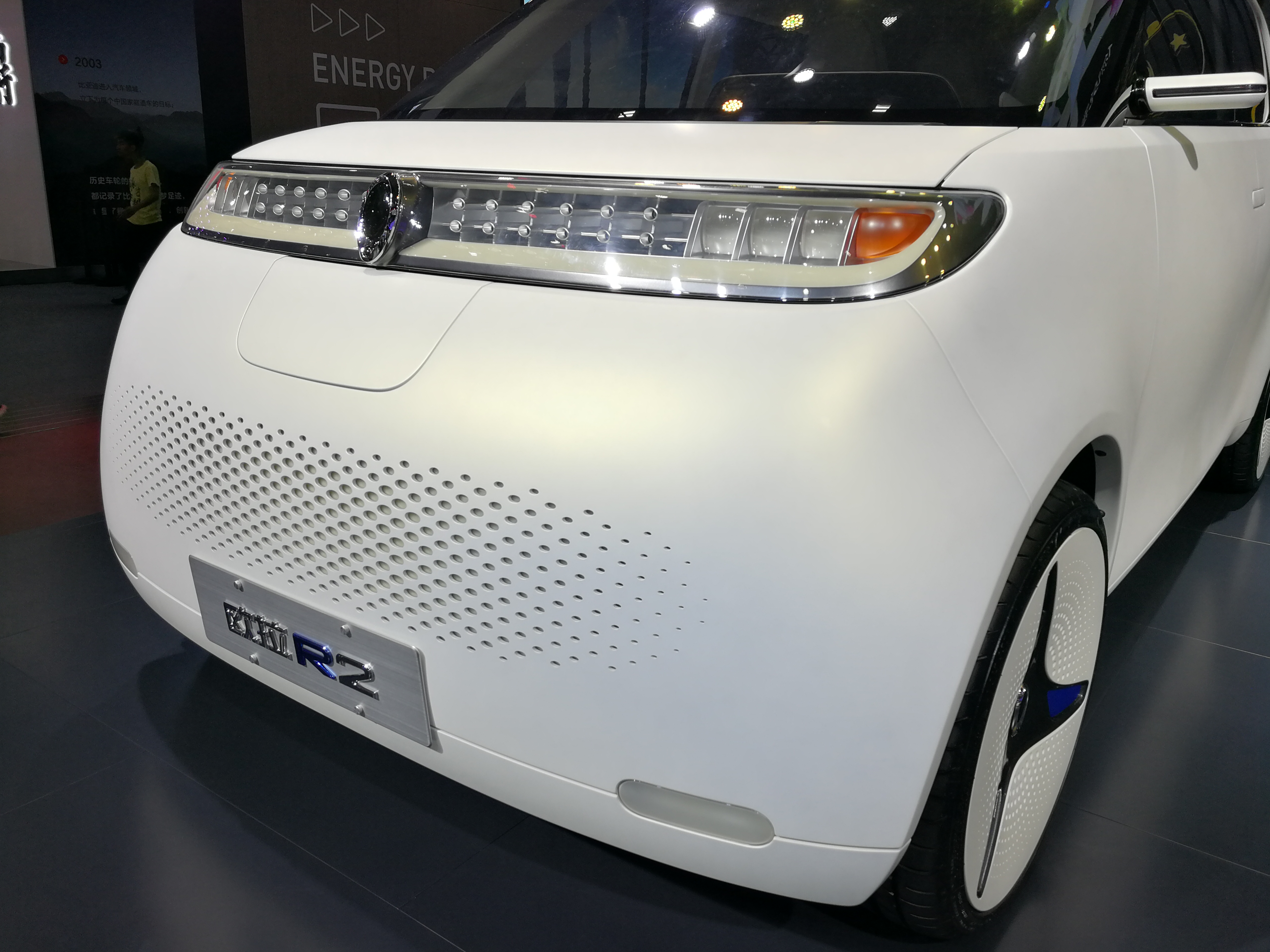
Ora R2 EV Concept study

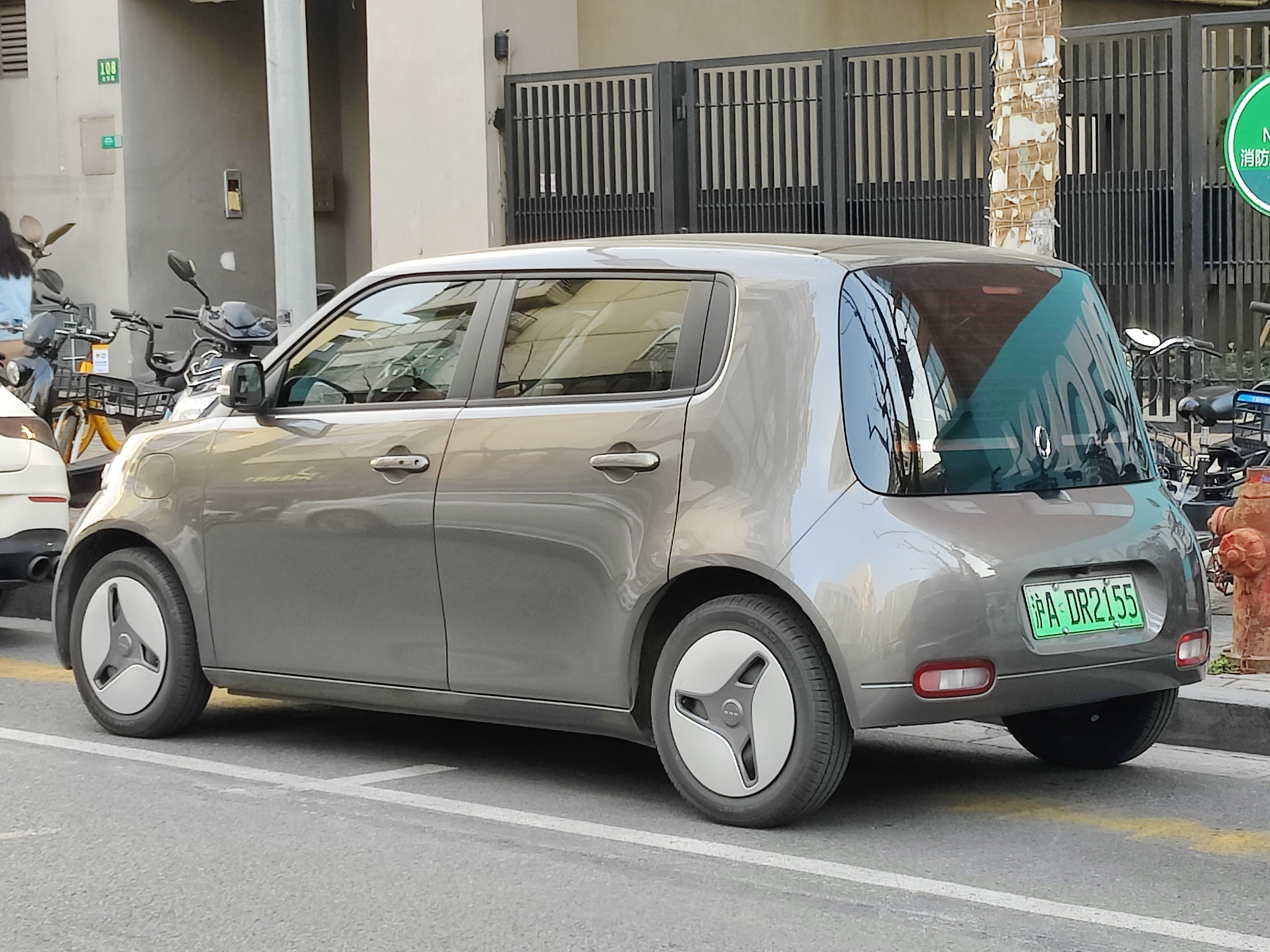
Production Ora White Cat rear

== Specifications ==
The White Cat is offered in two versions equipped with a 34kWh or 38 kW battery, with a claimed NEDC range of 360 km and 401 km, respectively. The 360 km model is equipped with a 35 kW/48 hp motor with a max torque of 125Nm, whereas the 401 km model is equipped with a 45 kW/61 hp motor with a max torque of 130Nm.

== Sales ==
Year	China
2023	7
2024	1
