= Great Wall Florid =

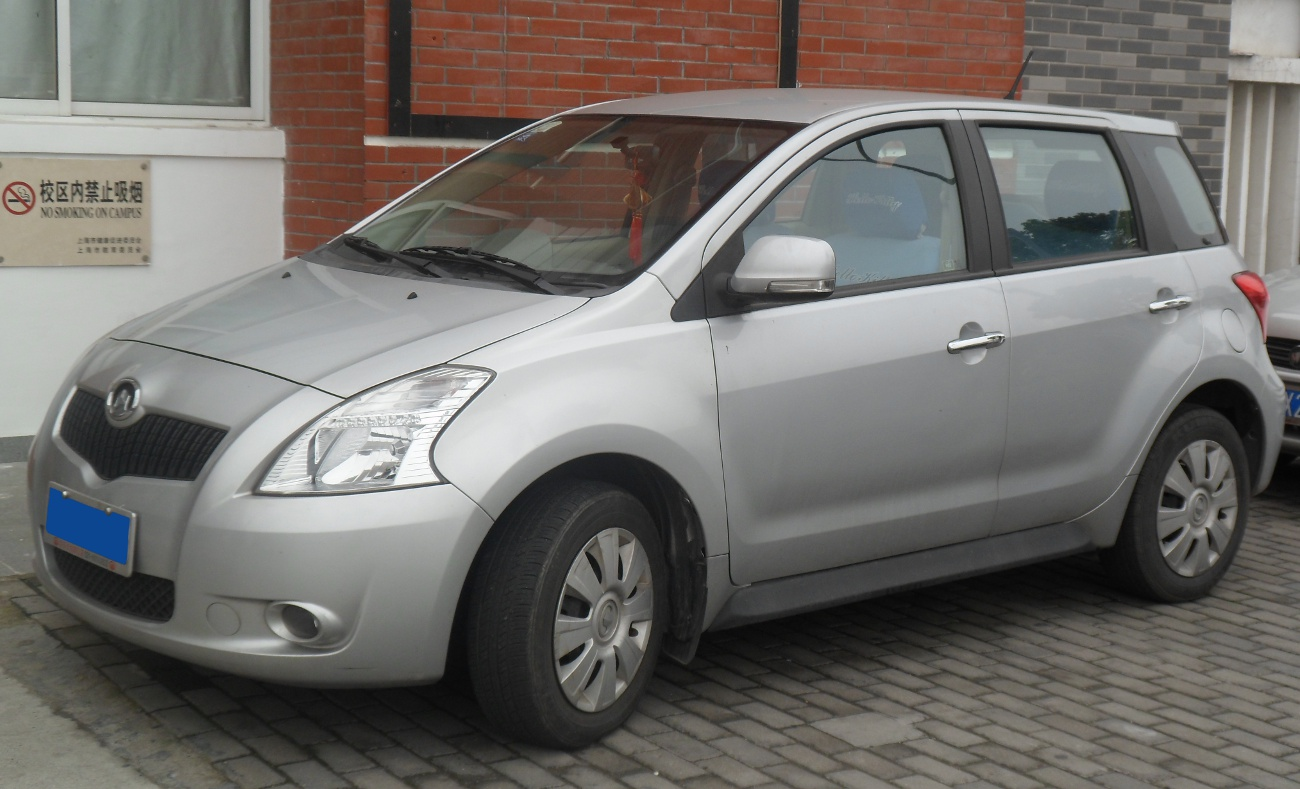

Overview
- Manufacturer: Great Wall Motors
- Also called: Great Wall Xuanli
- Production: 2008–2013
- Designer: TJ Innova Engineering & Technology

Body and chassis
- Class: Subcompact car
- Body style: 5-door hatchback
- Related: Haval H1

Powertrain
- Engine: Petrol: 1.3 L GW4G13 I4; 1.5 L GW4G15 I4
- Transmission: 5-speed manual

Dimensions
- Wheelbase: 2,368 mm (93.2 in)
- Length: 3,907 mm (153.8 in)
- Width: 1,694 mm (66.7 in)
- Height: 1,521 mm (59.9 in)

Chronology
- Successor: Ora Good Cat

The Great Wall Florid (Chinese: 长城炫丽; pinyin: Chángchéng Xuànlì) is a subcompact car produced by the Chinese manufacturer Great Wall Motors between 2008 and 2013. Styling is suspected to be copied from the first generation Toyota Ist (Scion xA), while the nose section is inspired by the second generation Toyota Vitz (Yaris hatchback) with the headlights being inspired by the Toyota Ractis.

It is sold in various countries including South Africa. There are two versions of Florid, the basic (Florid) and the Florid Cross which adds new design wheels, interior trim and a bodykit.

== Trim levels ==
Great Wall Florid comes in two available trim models: luxury and elite. The Luxury package comes with a standard 1.3 inline four cylinder engine with variable valve timing and dual overhead cam shafts. The elite model comes with a slightly larger 1.5 inline four cylinder with that same technology. Great Wall Motors also only allows the consumer to one transmission option: 5 speed manual.

Great Wall Motors' webpage also proudly advertises its use of "A German Bosch 8.0 ABS + EBD System", "World Famous Autoliv Airbags", and "A Height Adjustable Headlight Feature" (which pans the focus of the headlight either up or down).

== Gallery ==
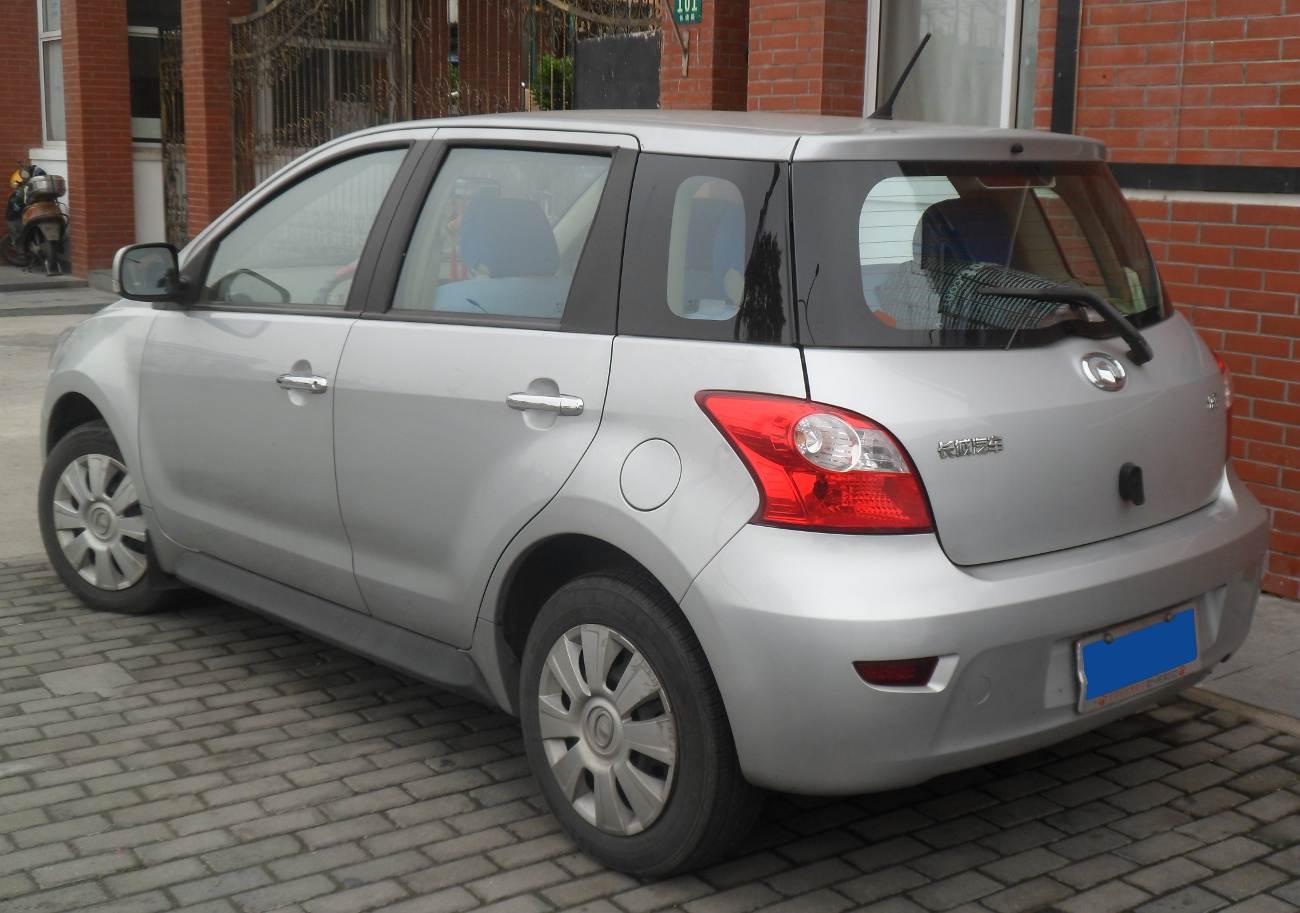
Great Wall Florid backside.

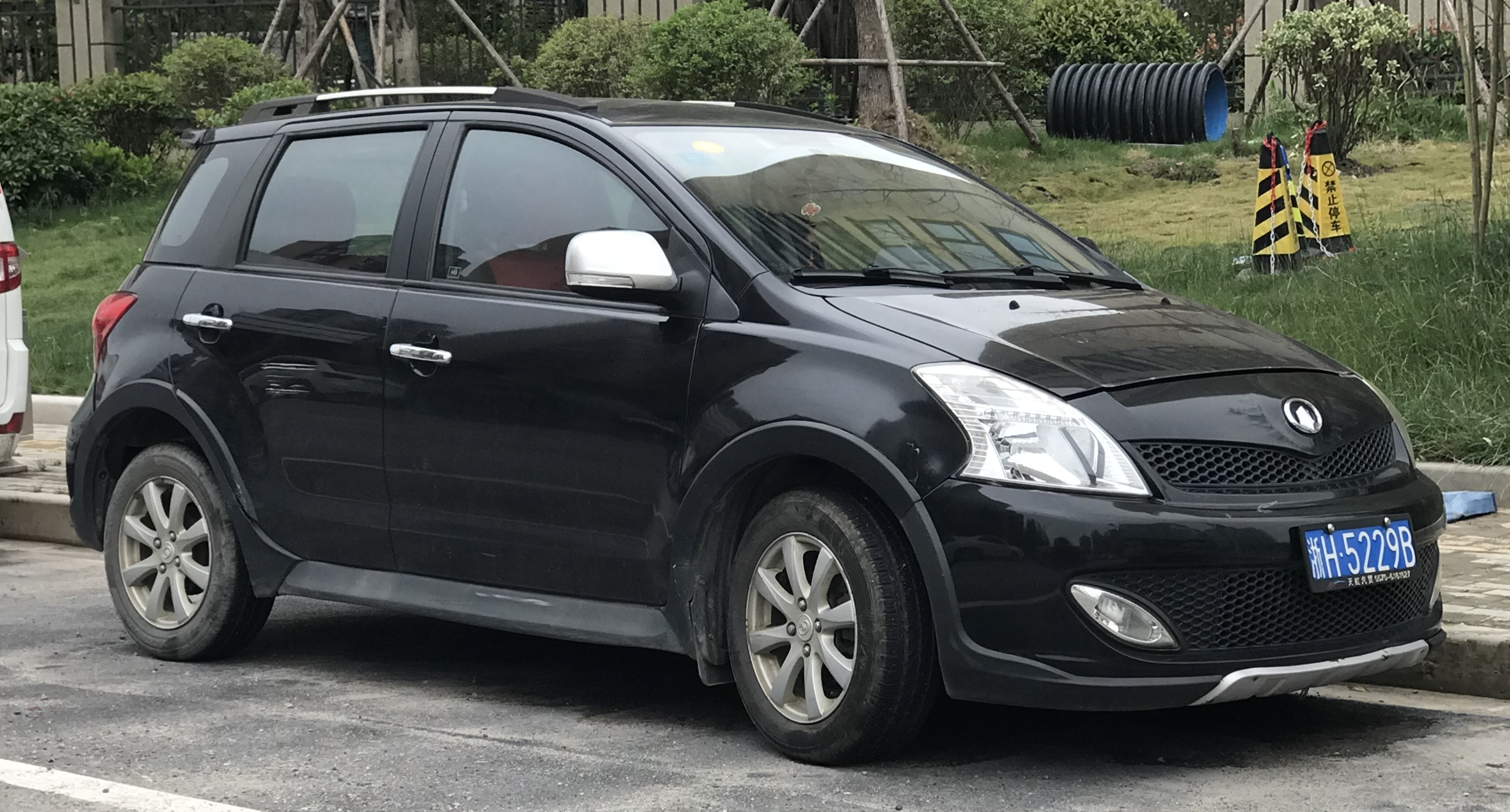
Great Wall Florid Cross

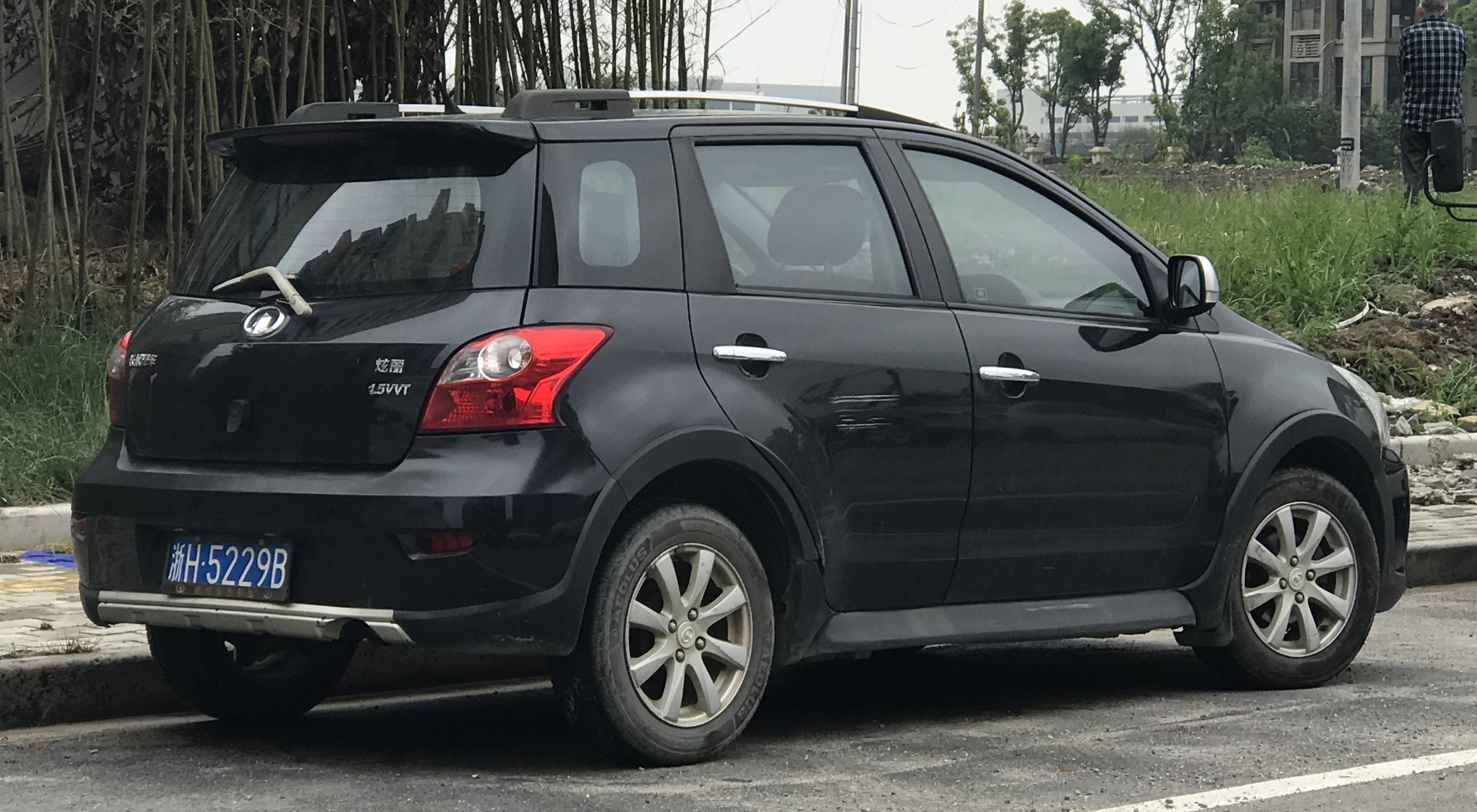
Great Wall Florid Cross
