= Great Wall Peri =

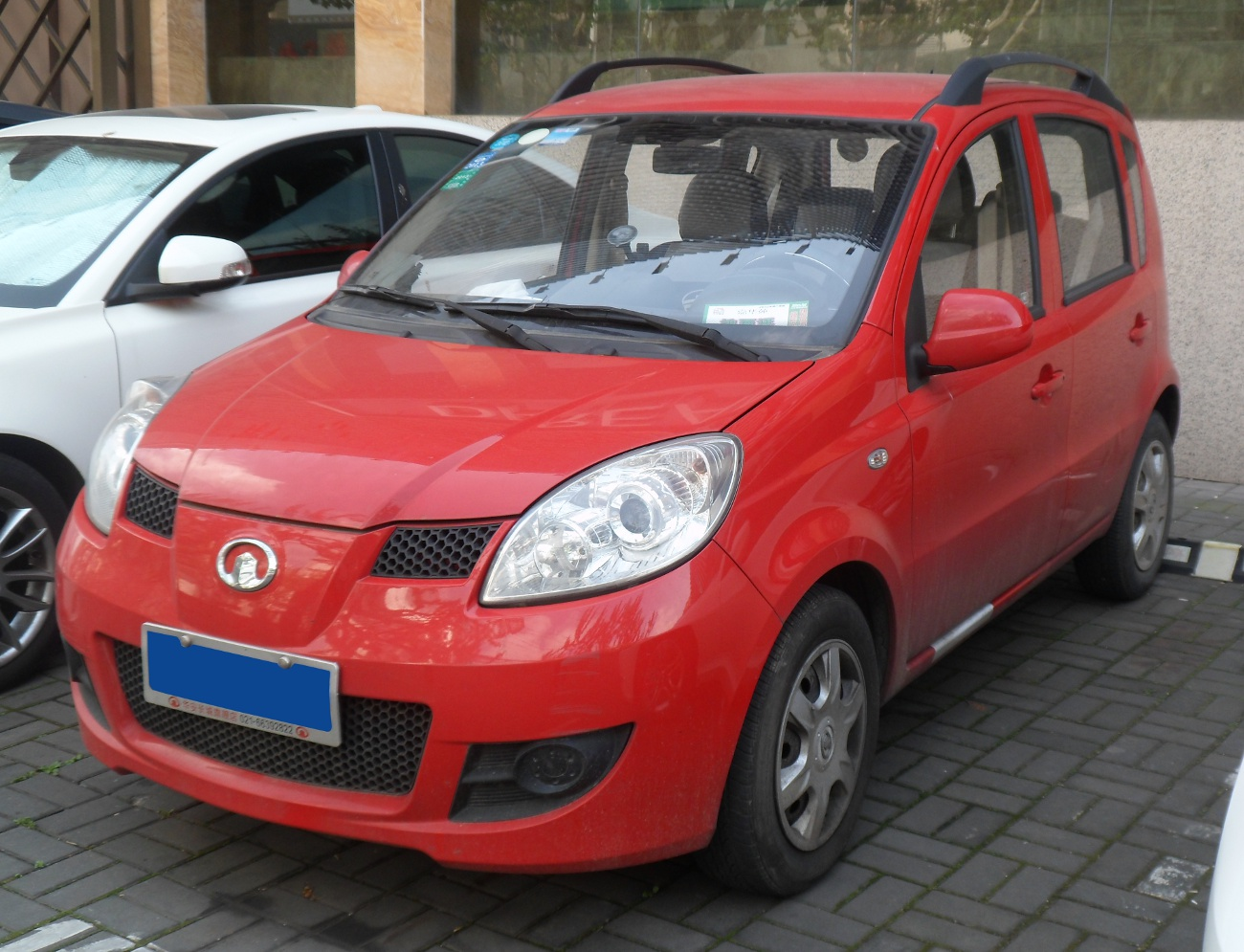

Overview
- Manufacturer: Great Wall Motors
- Production: 2007–2010
- Assembly: Hebei, China
- Designer: TJ Innova Engineering & Technology

Body and chassis
- Class: City car
- Body style: 5-door hatchback
- Layout: Front-engine, front-wheel-drive or four-wheel-drive

Powertrain
- Engine: Petrol: 1.3 L GW4G13 I4
- Transmission: 5-speed manual

Dimensions
- Wheelbase: 2,299 mm (90.5 in)
- Length: 3,548 mm (139.7 in)
- Width: 1,580 mm (62.2 in)
- Height: 1,581 mm (62.2 in)
- Curb weight: 1,015 kg (2,238 lb)

Chronology
- Successor: Ora Black Cat/White Cat

The Great Wall Peri (simplified Chinese: 长城精灵; traditional Chinese: 長城精靈; pinyin: Chángchéng Jīnglíng) is a city car produced by the Chinese automobile manufacturer Great Wall Motors.

== Overview ==
The Peri is sold in multiple Asian countries. One of the main advantages against established European, American and other Asian competitors is the low cost of the Peri compared to these alternatives.

A key reason for the in-comparison low retail price of the Great Wall Peri is that it is based heavily on older models by other manufacturers. The entry-level motor is supplied by Mitsubishi and the interior resembles the second-generation Fiat Panda while the exterior strongly resembles the first-generation Nissan Note. The Great Wall Peri complies with the Euro-III emissions standard.

Great Wall Peri

Rear

== Peri 4x4/Haval M1 ==
Great Wall also produce a crossover version called the Haval M1. It was previously known as the Peri 4x4.

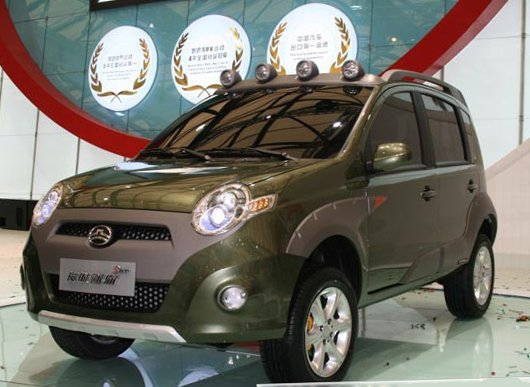
Great Wall Peri 4x4

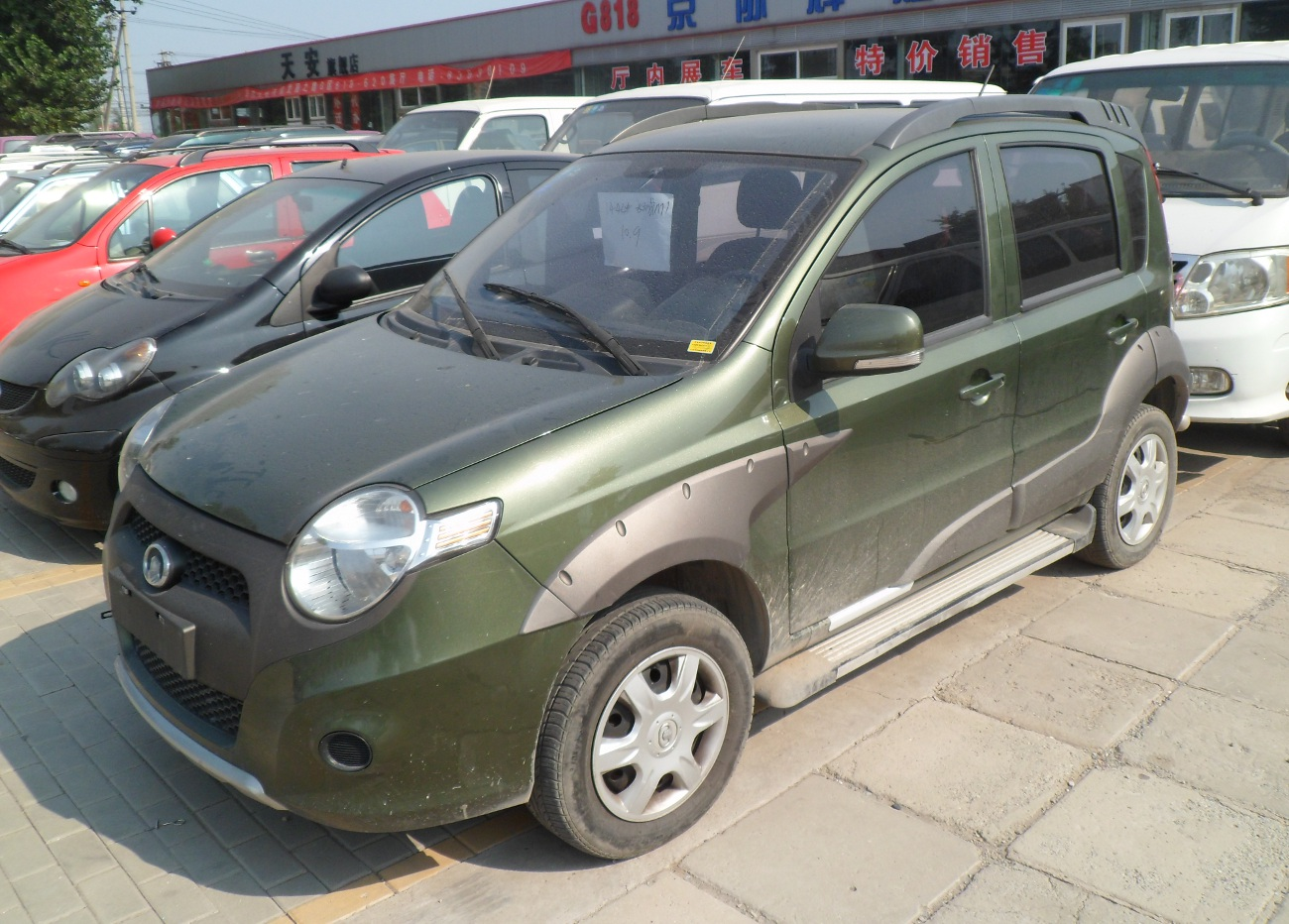
Haval M1 front

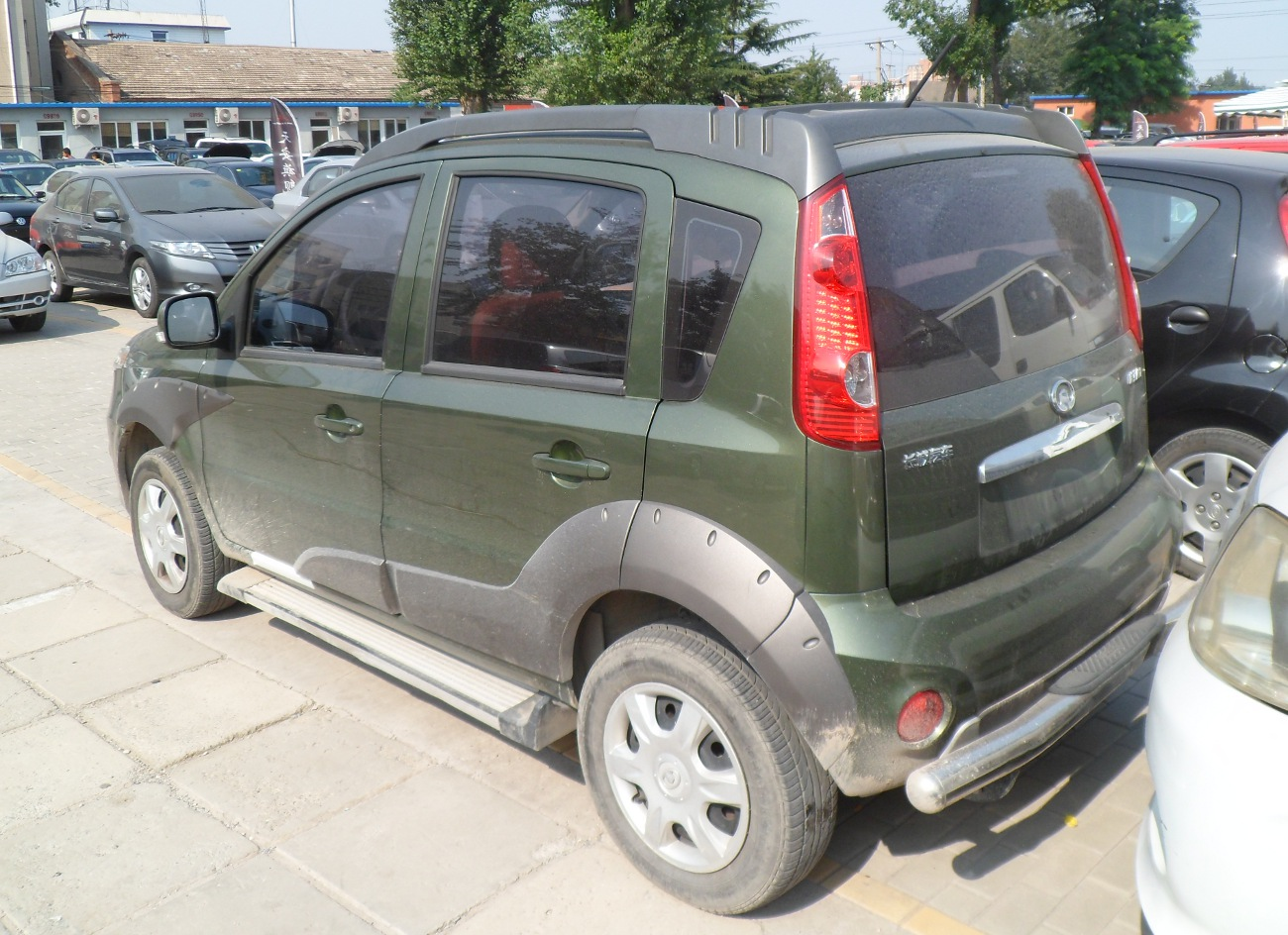
Haval M1 rear

== Fiat Panda copy controversy ==
By December 2006, Italian automaker Fiat was considering taking legal action against Great Wall for copying their popular second-generation Panda as the Peri. Apart from the front end, the Peri was designed to look identical to the Panda inside and out.

On July 16, 2008, a Turin court upheld Fiat's claim and prohibited the Peri from being imported into Europe. In addition, the court order ruled that Great Wall Motors would pay Fiat a 15,000-euro fine for the first Peri imported, and an additional 50,000 euros for every subsequent car that was imported.

In October 2009, Great Wall Motor sued Fiat, accusing the latter of espionage. In the lawsuit, Great Wall claims that "Fiat once instigated espionage to prowl into its research center and take photos of Peri small car that was still under development."
