= TJ Innova Engineering & Technology =

Chinese automotive design company

TJ Innova Engineering & Technology Co., Ltd.
- Industry: Automotive
- Founded: 1999; 27 years ago
- Founder: Leiled Tji and Tong Jian
- Headquarters: Shanghai, China
- Services: Automotive design and engineering
- Website: www.tji.cn

TJ Innova Engineering & Technology
- Traditional Chinese: 上海同濟同捷科技股份有限公司
- Simplified Chinese: 上海同济同捷科技股份有限公司
Transcriptions
Standard Mandarin
- Hanyu Pinyin: Shànghǎi Tóngjì Tóngjié Kējì Gǔfèn Yǒuxiàn Gōngsī

TJ Innova Engineering & Technology Co., Ltd. (上海同济同捷科技股份有限公司), abbreviated as TJI, is a private design company for the automotive industry. They are specialized in creating vehicle concepts and in the building of design studies and concept cars. The company was founded in 1999 by Professor Leiled Tji and Tong Jian. The company is located in Shanghai.

== History ==
Leiled Tji began his career in the automotive industry in 1989 with a cooperation with the First Automotive Works and in collaboration with the Changchun Auto Research Institute and the Harbin Industrial University. Two years later he founded the Auto Technology Institute as a part of the FAW Group. In 1999 he founded TJI which was his first independent company.

TJI was one of the first Chinese company to adapt to modern design tools such as 3D CAD. Currently the company employs more than 1,400 workers and works on projects for several Chinese companies. Well known works from the design company includes cars such as the Lifan 520, the JAC Rein and the Soueast Lioncel, with several cars being accused of plagiarism. The most famous concept car from TJI is the Tong Jian S11 hybrid sportscar which was shown during the 2005 Shanghai Auto Show. TJI has received several awards such as the New Most Growth Enterprise, the Award for Innovation Elite of Yangtze Delta Area, Award for Science & Technology Progress and the Award for Special Contribution for Independent Design.

== Vehicles designed by TJ Innova Engineering & Technology ==
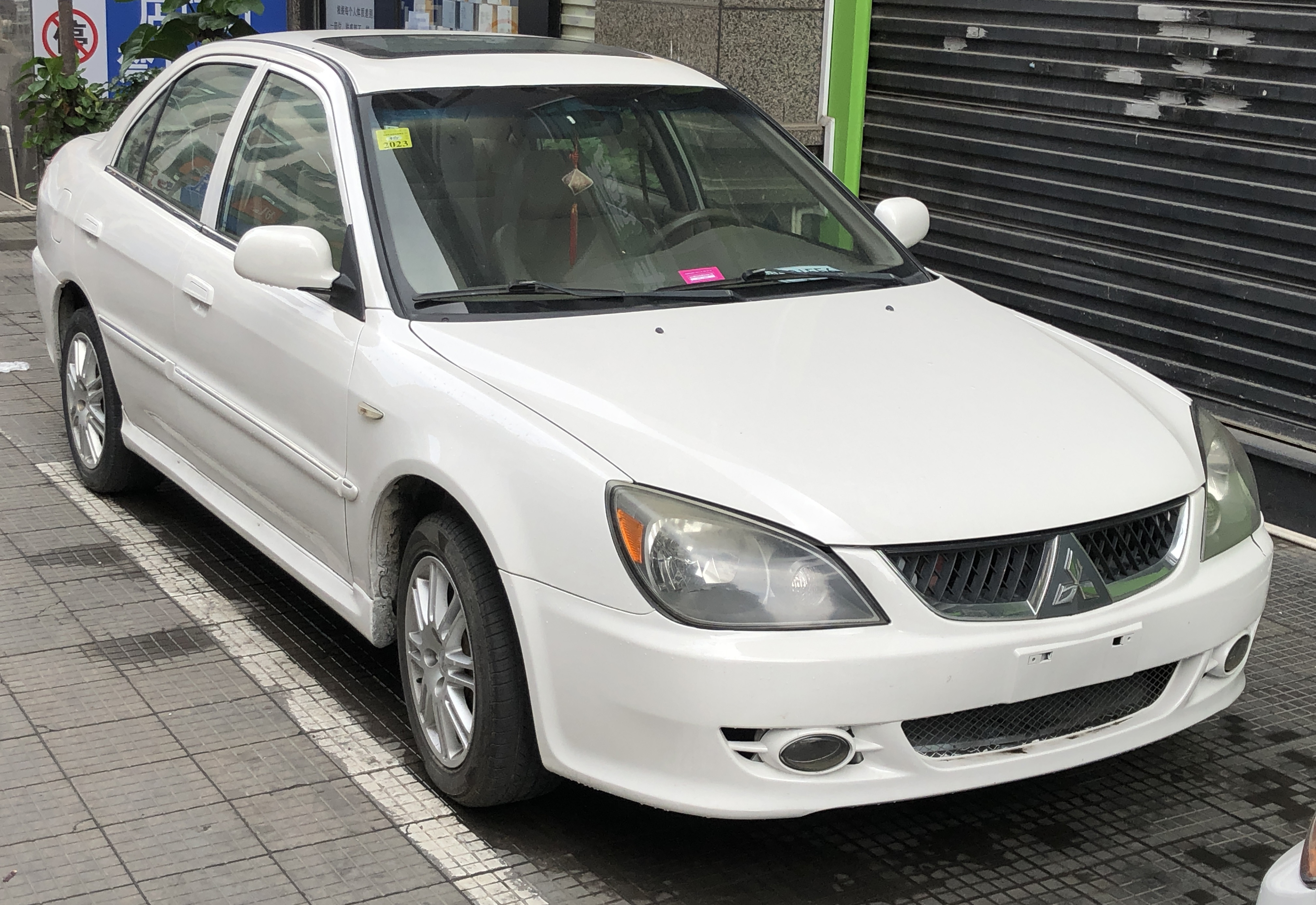
A Soueast Lioncel II

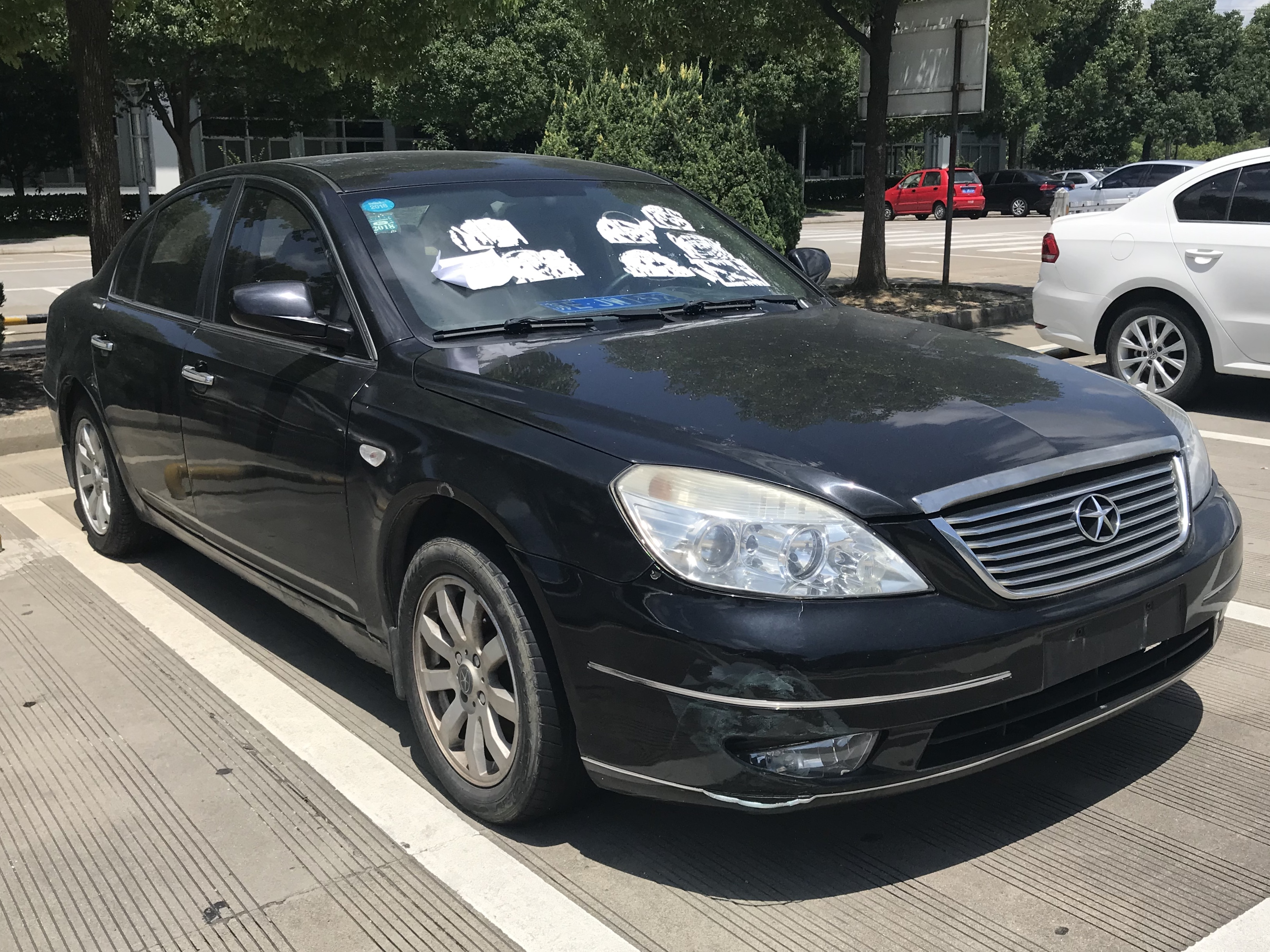
A JAC Binyue C200

A JAC Rein

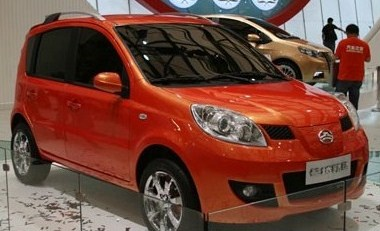
A Great Wall Peri

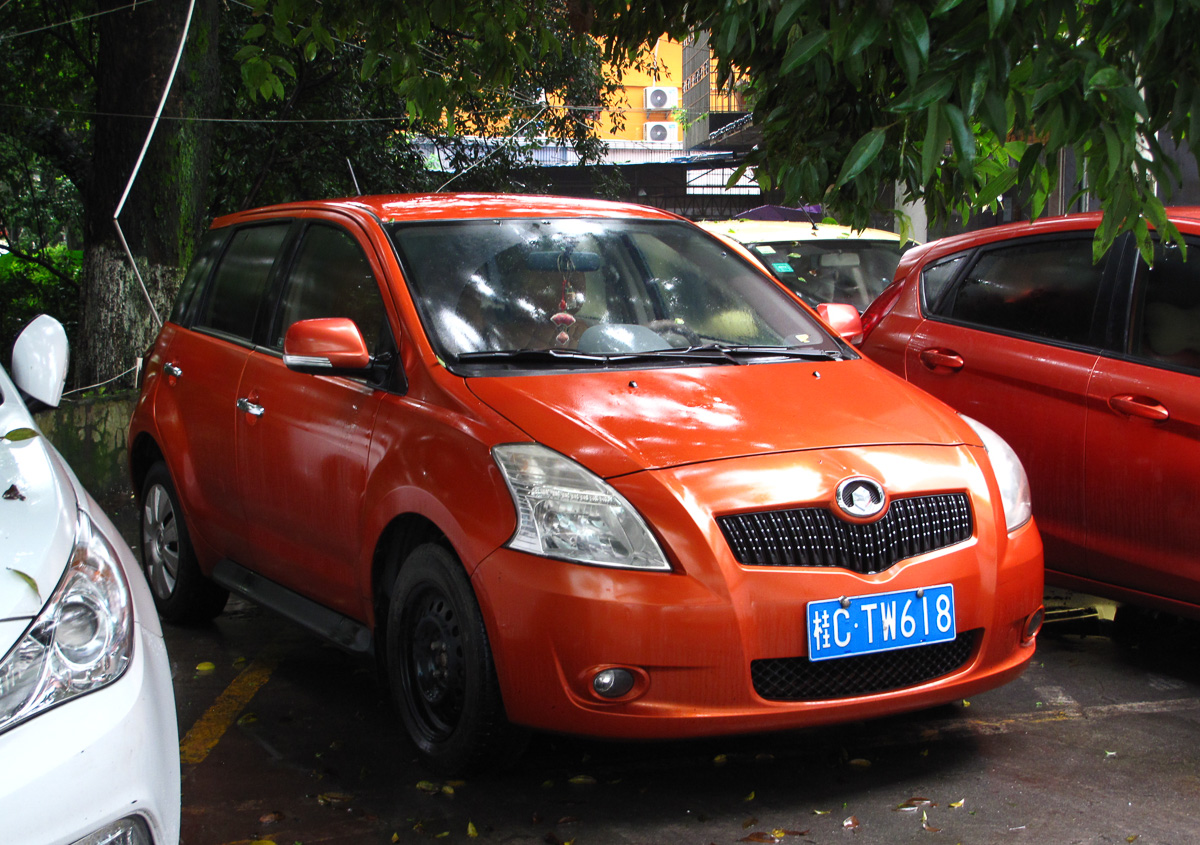
A Great Wall Florid

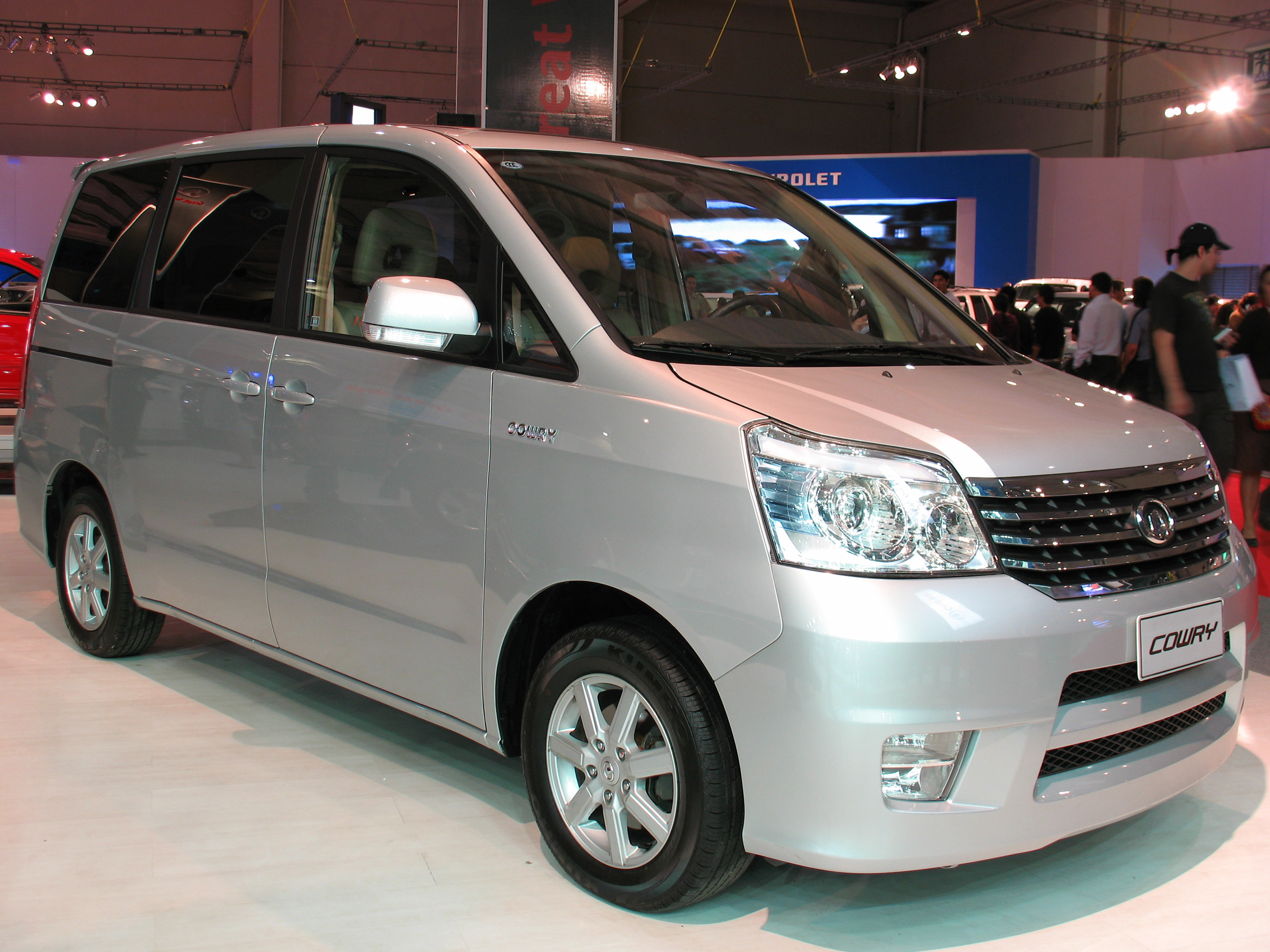
A Great Wall Cowry

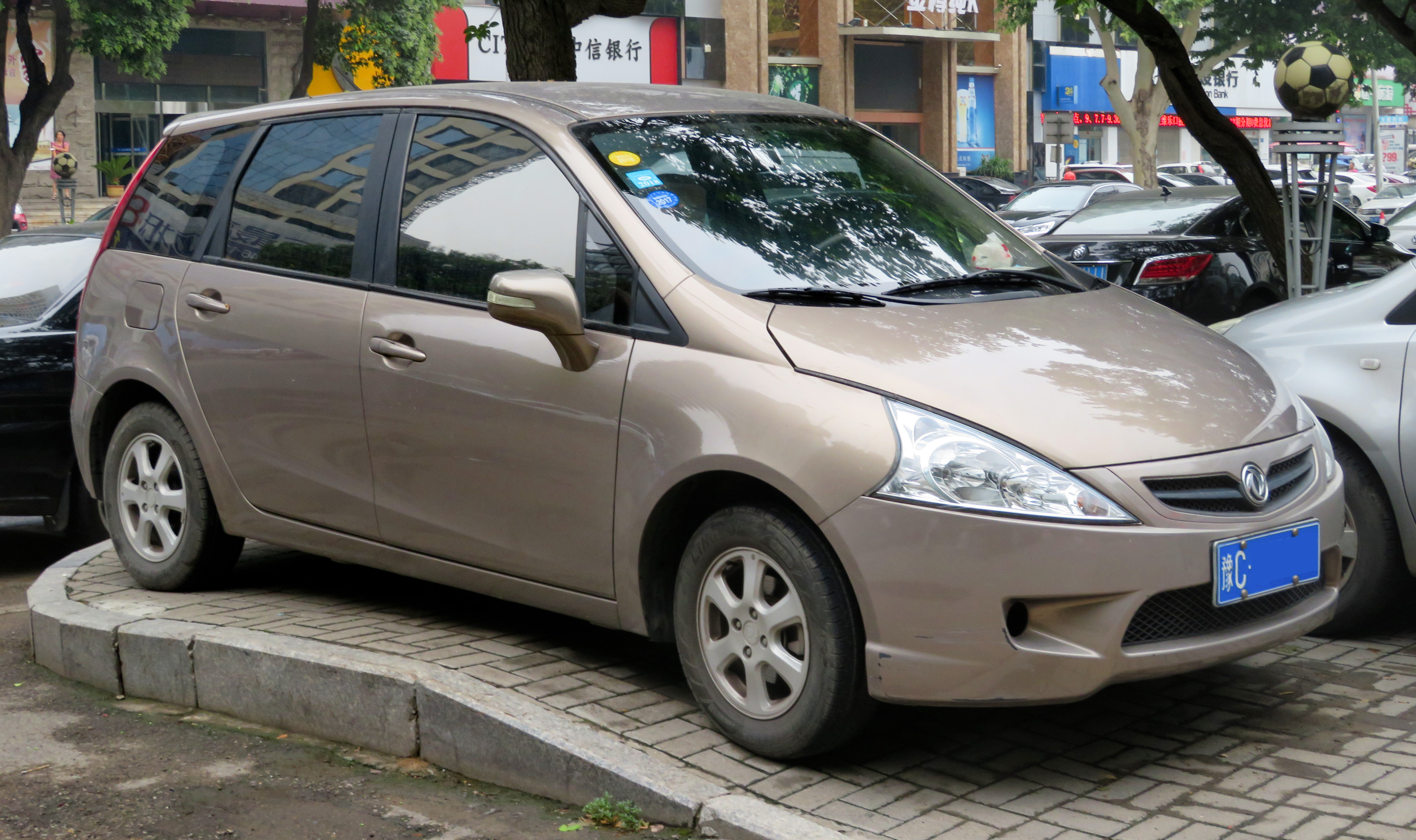
A Fengxing Jingyi
