= Ora Black Cat =

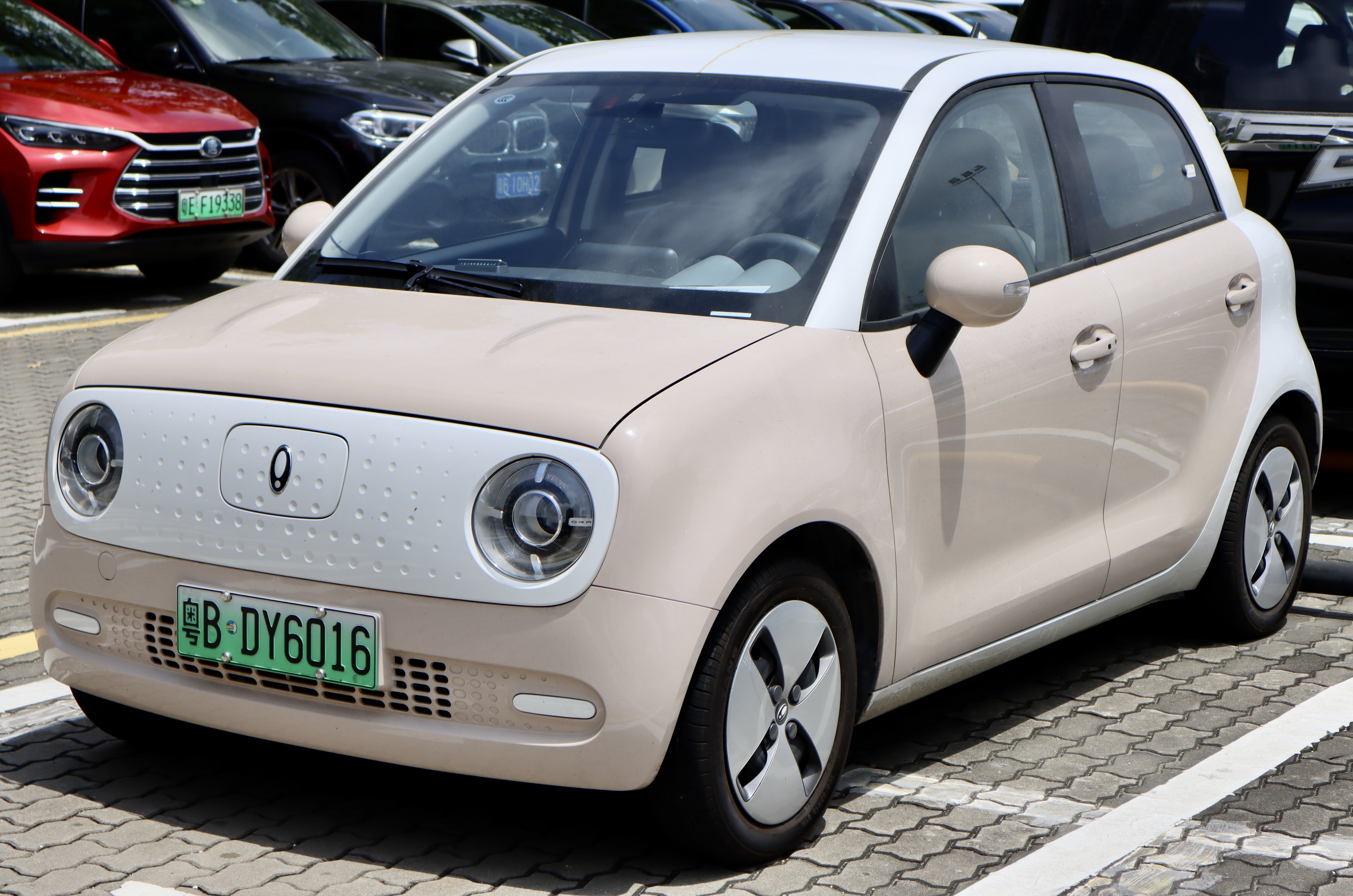

Overview
- Manufacturer: Great Wall Motor
- Also called: Ora R1 (2019–2020)
- Production: 2019–2022
- Assembly: China: Taizhou, Zhejiang (GWM Taizhou Smart Factory)

Body and chassis
- Class: City car (A)
- Body style: 5-door hatchback
- Layout: Front-motor, front-wheel-drive
- Platform: ME platform

Powertrain
- Electric motor: Permanent magnet synchronous motor
- Power output: 35 kW (47 hp; 48 PS)
- Transmission: 1-speed direct-drive
- Battery: 33 kWh lithium polymer (LMP) battery
- Electric range: 301 km (187 mi) (NEDC)

Dimensions
- Wheelbase: 2,475 mm (97.4 in)
- Length: 3,495 mm (137.6 in)
- Width: 1,660 mm (65.4 in)
- Height: 1,560 mm (61.4 in)
- Curb weight: 977 kg (2,154 lb)

Chronology
- Predecessor: Great Wall Peri

The Ora Black Cat (Chinese: 欧拉黑猫; pinyin: Ōulā Hēimāo), also known as the R1 is a battery electric city car produced by the Chinese car manufacturer Great Wall Motors and sold under its electric vehicle sub-brand, Ora, from 2019 to 2022. The Black Cat was unveiled at the Shanghai Motor Show in April 2019.

Great Wall Motors announced that Ora R1 renamed to Ora Black Cat at the Chongqing Auto Show in July 2020. In February 2022, Ora confirmed that the Black Cat was discontinued in China.

== Overview ==
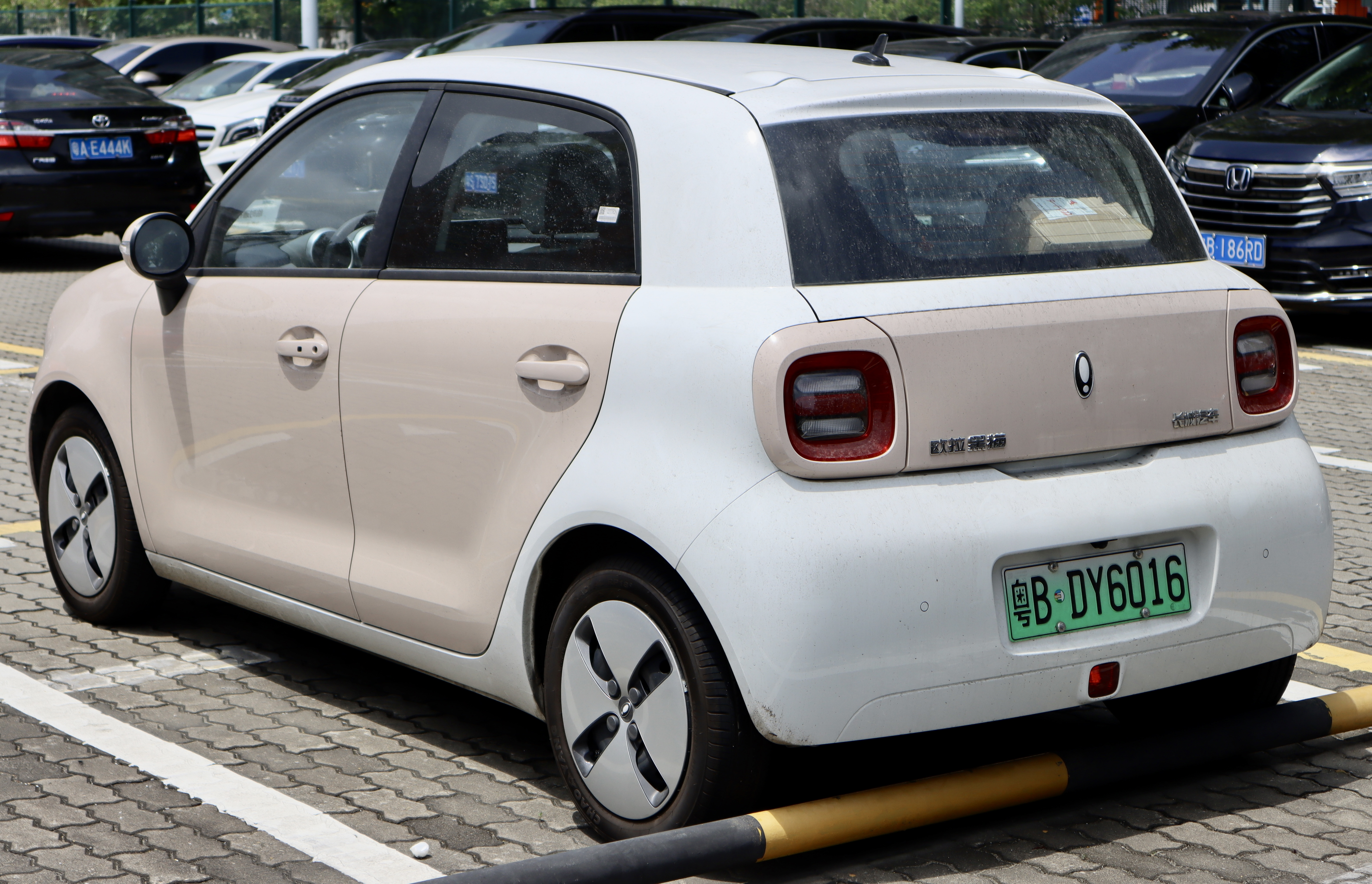
Rear view

The lithium-ion battery of the Black Cat can propel the vehicle up to 102 km/h (63.4 mph) and has an NEDC range of up to 301 kilometres (187 mi). The motor is a front-positioned 48 hp (36 kW; 49 PS) and 125 Nm permanent magnet motor.

The Ora R1 is priced between 59,800 and 77,800 yuan ($8,680 to US$11,293), making the R1 the world's cheapest electric car as of 2019.

The Black Cat also has similar styling to the Smart ForFour.

== Export markets ==
Great Wall Motors announced its introduction in India with its Haval and Ora brands, with the Black Cat being one of the first models to be introduced in India.

Ora has started activities in Latin America in 2020, and Costa Rica is one of the first countries receiving this new model. Starting at US$19.990, prices are significantly higher, although the Black Cat is still the cheapest electric car in the country.

== Sales ==
Year	China
2023	294
2024	4
