= List of pickup trucks =

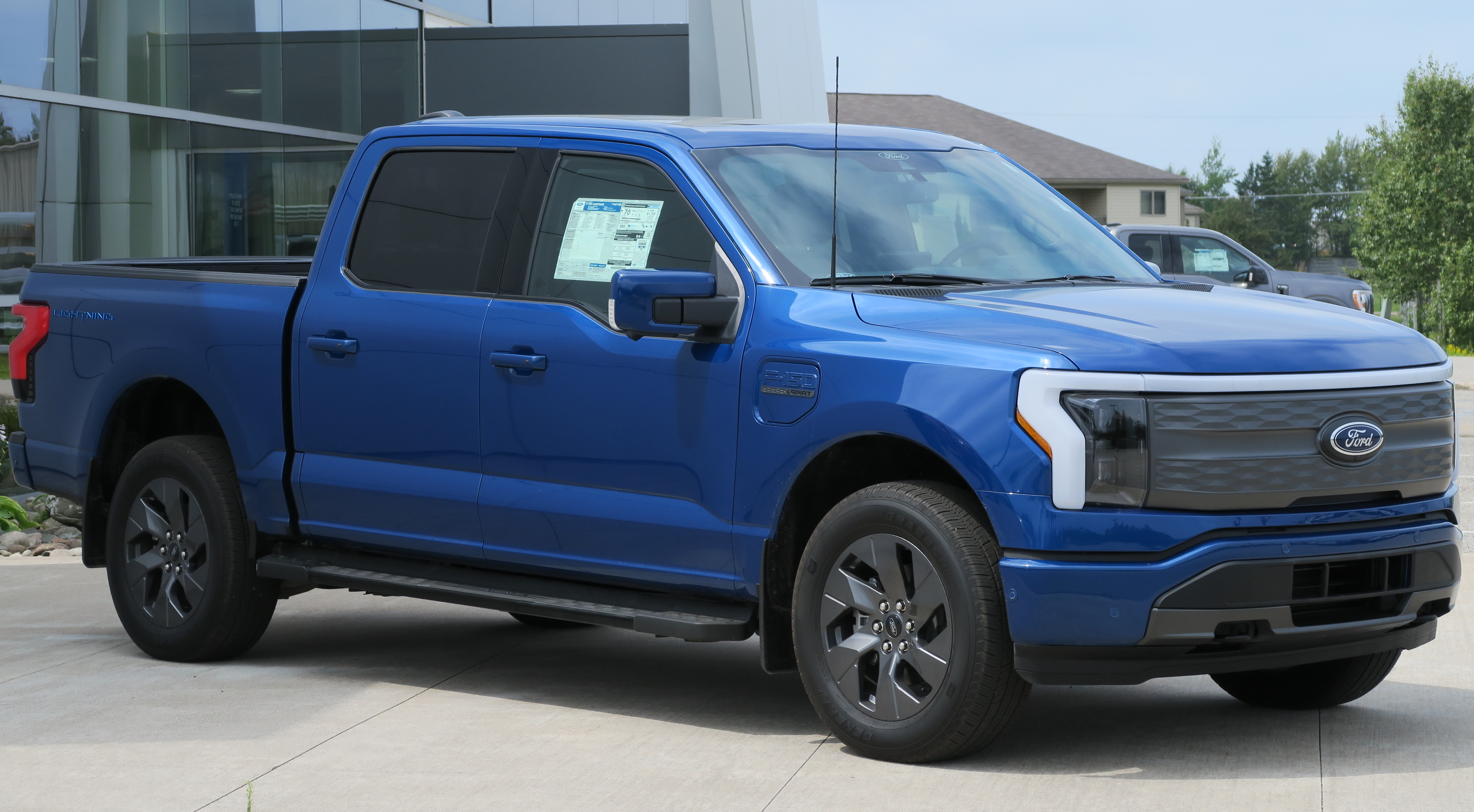
The battery electric Ford F-150 Lightning pickup

This is an incomplete list of pickup trucks that are currently in production (as of February 2026).

This list also includes off-roader, sport, luxury, and hybrid trucks, both discontinued and still in production. Also, some vehicles are sold under different brands, therefore some vehicles may be listed more than once but usually link to the same page. Different countries/continents may also classify vehicles differently; for example, the Nissan Navara name is known throughout most of the world, but in the United States and Canada, its sold as the Nissan Frontier, and in Mexico it's sold as the Nissan NP300.

== Current ==
Company	Pickup truck	Image	Class	Regions sold
212	Explorer T01		Mid-size	China
Agrale	Marruá		Compact	Brazil
AM General	Humvee C-Series		Full-size	USA, Canada
Beijing Automobile Works	BAW Luling		Compact	China
Bremach	T-Rex		Electric Heavy Duty	Europe, Russia, United States, Canada
BYD	Shark/Shark 6		Mid-size	Australia and New Zealand, Brazil, Brunei, Mexico, Philippines, Pakistan, South Africa
Changan	F70		Mid-size	China
Changan	Star Truck		mini	China, Southeast Asia, South America, Africa
Chery	Himla		Mid-size	Chile
Chevrolet	Colorado		Mid-size	USA, Canada, Mexico, Brazil, Thailand
Chevrolet	D-Max		Compact	Chile, Colombia
Chevrolet	S-10 Max		Mid-size	Mexico
Chevrolet	LSSV (Milverado)		Fulls-ize	United States, Canada (military only)
Chevrolet	Silverado 1500		Luxury/Full-size	North America, Chile, Middle East, Egypt
Chevrolet	Silverado 1500 Hybrid		Hybrid Full-size	North America, Middle East, Egypt
Chevrolet	Silverado 2500 HD		Luxury/Heavy Duty	USA, Canada, Mexico
Chevrolet	Silverado 3500 HD		Luxury/Heavy Duty	United States of America, Canada, Mexico
Chevrolet	Silverado EV		Full-size	United States of America
Chevrolet	Montana		Coupe	Latin America, South Africa
Daihatsu	Hijet		mini	Asia, Africa, South America
Dongfeng	Rich		Compact	Chile, Africa
Dongfeng	Z9		Mid-size	China, Chile
DR	PK8		Mid-size	Europe
Evo	Cross 4		Mid-size	Europe
Fiat	Strada		Coupe	Europe, South America, South Africa
Fiat	Titano		Mid-size	Brazil, Argentina
Fiat	Toro		Compact	Brazil
Ford	Maverick		Compact	USA, Canada
Ford	Ranger		Mid-size	Worldwide, except Japan
Ford	F-150		Luxury/Full-size	North America (except Trinidad and Tobago, Saint Kitts and Nevis), Suriname, Ecuador, Peru, Chile, the Middle East, Iceland, Netherlands (Aruba, Curaçao, and Sint Maarten), United Kingdom (Cayman Islands), Australia
Ford	F-150 Raptor		Off-Road Full-size	North America, Middle East
Ford	F-250		Luxury/Heavy Duty	USA, Canada, Mexico, Venezuela, Middle East, Iceland
Ford	F-350		Luxury/Heavy Duty	USA, Canada, Mexico, Venezuela, Iceland, Middle East
Ford	F-450		Luxury/Heavy Duty	USA, Canada, Mexico, Middle East
Foton	SUP		Compact	China
Foton	Tunland		Compact	China, Australia, South Africa
Foton	Tunland Yutu		Compact	China, Australia, South Africa
GMC	Canyon		Mid-size	USA, Canada, Mexico
GMC	Hummer EV		Full-size	USA
GMC	Sierra 1500		Luxury/Full-size	North America, Middle East, Germany
GMC	Sierra 2500		Luxury/Heavy Duty	USA, Canada, Mexico, Middle East
GMC	Sierra 3500		Luxury/Heavy Duty	USA, Canada, Mexico, Middle East
GMC	Sierra Hybrid		Luxury/Full-size Hybrid	North America,
Great Wall	King Kong Cannon		Mid-size	China
Great Wall	Pao		Mid-size	China
Great Wall	Shanhai Cannon		Mid-size	China, Australia, New Zealand, Thailand
Great Wall	Wingle 7		Mid-size	China, Australia, New Zealand
Hafei	Ruiyi		mini	China, Syria
Honda	Ridgeline		Mid-size	North America, Caribbean, and Latin America
Huanghai	N1		Mid-size	China
Huanghai	N2		Mid-size	China
Hyundai	Porter		Compact	South Korea, Middle East, France (New Caledonia)
Hyundai	Santa Cruz		Compact	North America
Ineos	Grenadier Quartermaster		Mid-size	
Iran Khodro	IKCO Arisun		Coupe	Iran
Isuzu	D-Max		Mid-size	Worldwide, except North America, South Korea, Japan and Taiwan
JAC	Hunter		Mid-size	China
JAC	Ruiling		Compact	China
JAC	Shuailing T6		Mid-size	China
JAC	Shuailing T8		Mid-size	China
JAC	V7		Mid-size	China
Jeep	Gladiator		Mid-size	United States, Canada
Jetour	Zongheng F700		Full-size	
JMC	Baodian		Mid-size	China
JMC	Yuhu		Mid-size	China
JMC	Yuhu 7		Mid-size	China
Kia	Bongo		Compact	South Korea, Middle East, South America, Southeast Asia
Kia	Tasman		Mid-size	South Korea
KGM	Musso		Mid-size	South Korea, Australia
KGM	Musso EV		Mid-size	South Korea
Mahindra & Mahindra	Scorpio Pickup		Compact	China, South East Asia, Middle East, Africa, Australia
Maxus	T60		Mid-size	China, Australia, Chile, UAE, Thailand (as MG Extender)
Maxus	T90		Mid-size	China, Australia, Chile, UAE, Thailand (as MG Extender)
Maxus	Terron 9		Mid-size	China, Australia, New Zealand
Mazda	BT-50		Mid-size	ASEAN, Australia, New Zealand, Chile, Ecuador, Guatemala, Panama, Peru and Africa
MG	Extender		Mid-size	Thailand
MG	MGU9		Mid-size	Australia, Pakistan
Mitsubishi	Minicab		mini	Japan, China, Southeast Asia
Mitsubishi	Triton		Mid-size	Worldwide, except the United States, Canada, P.R.C., Europe, South Korea and North Korea.
Navistar Defense	MXT Cargo		Heavy Duty	United Kingdom, United States
Navistar Defense	MXT-MVA		Heavy Duty	United Kingdom, United States
Nissan	Clipper		mini	Japan
Nissan	Frontier		Mid-size	North America
Nissan	Frontier Pro		Mid-size	China
Nissan	Navara		Mid-size	Worldwide, except Japan, Europe, South Korea, USA and Canada
Peugeot	Landtrek		Mid-size	
Polarsun	SZS		Compact	China
Qingling	Taga		Mid-size	China
Radar	RD6		Mid-size	China
Ram	700		Coupe	Mexico
Ram	1000		Compact	Latin America
Ram	1200	2016 model pictured	Mid-size	Mexico
Ram	1500		Luxury/Full-size	North America, Middle East, Chile, Brazil
Ram	1500 Laramie Limited		Full-size/Luxury	North America, Chile
Ram	1500 Rebel		Full-size/Off-Road	North America, Chile
Ram	2500		Luxury/Heavy Duty	North America, Chile, Brazil
Ram	3500		Luxury/Heavy Duty	North America
Ram	Dakota		Mid-size	South America
Ram	Power Wagon		Luxury/Heavy Duty	North America
Ram	Rampage		Compact	Brazil
Rely	R08		Mid-size	China
Rivian	R1T		electric Mid-size	United States
SCAM	Daily 4x4		Mid-size	Europe, South America, Africa, Middle East, Australia
Shelby	F150 Super Snake		Full-size	
Sinotruk	Bolden		Mid-size	
TAV	Gurkha Pickup		Heavy Duty	Worldwide
Tata	Ace		mini	India, South East Asia, Europe, South America, South Africa
Tata	TL		Compact	South Africa
Tata	Xenon		Compact	India, South East Asia, Europe, South America
Tesla	Cybertruck		Full-size	Worldwide
Toyota	Hilux		Mid-size	worldwide, except USA, Canada, and South Korea
Toyota	Hilux Champ		Mid-size	Asia, South America
Toyota	Land Cruiser 79		Off-Road Full-size	Australia, New Zealand, Africa, Central America, Caribbean, Middle East, France (New Caledonia)
Toyota	Tacoma		Mid-size	USA, Canada, Mexico, France (New Caledonia)
Toyota	Tundra		Luxury/Full-size	USA, Canada, Mexico, Chile, France (New Caledonia), Japan
UAZ	UAZ Pickup		Mid-size	Russia, Eastern Europe, South East Asia, Mongolia, Nicaragua
Uri	Desert Runner		Compact	Africa
Volkswagen	Amarok		Mid-size	Europe, Latin America, Middle East, South Africa, Australia, New Zealand
Volkswagen	Saveiro		Coupe	South America
Workhorse	W-15		Electric Full-size	United States
Wuling	Longka		Mid-size	China
ZX	Grand Tiger		Compact	China, Middle East, South East Asia, Russia, Eastern Europe, Northern Africa
ZX	Terralord		Compact	

== Current: chassis cab ==
Below are vehicles manufactured in chassis cab configuration only. While they can be fitted with pickup beds, they are not strictly considered pickup trucks.

Company	Pickup truck	Image	Class	Regions sold
Cenntro	Citelec		Compact	United States, France
Ford	F-550		Heavy Duty	USA, Canada, Mexico
Ford	F-650		Heavy Duty	USA, Canada, Mexico
Ford	F-750		Heavy Duty	USA, Canada, Mexico
Freightliner	Freightliner Unimog		Heavy Duty	USA, Canada
International	CV		Heavy Duty	USA, Canada
Mercedes-Benz	Unimog		Heavy Duty	Europe, North America, South America, Middle East, Africa, Oceania, China
Ram	4500		Luxury/Heavy Duty	North America
Ram	5500		Luxury/Heavy Duty	North America

== Current aftermarket manufactured ==
All manufacturers below are secondary suppliers that take OEM vehicles to modify and resell.

Company	Pickup truck	Image	Class	Regions sold
AEV	Brute		Off-Road Compact	USA, Canada
AEV	Prospector		Off-road Full-size	USA
Brabus	Brabus Mercedes-Benz Unimog		Heavy Duty	Europe, North America, South America, Middle East, Africa, Oceania, China
Cenntro	Kombi EV		Compact	United States, France
F650 Pickups and Midwest Automotive Designs	F-650 Supertruck		Luxury Heavy Duty	United States, Canada
Kahn Design	Kahn Land Rover Defender 110 Pickup		Luxury Mid-size	United Kingdom
Midwest Automotive Designs	M2 106 and M2 112 Supertrucks		Luxury Heavy Duty	United States, Canada
Midwest Automotive Designs	International MXT Supertruck		Luxury Heavy Duty	United States, Canada
Midwest Automotive Designs	International TerraStar Supertruck		Luxury Heavy Duty	United States, Canada
Midwest Automotive Designs	International DuraStar Supertruck		Luxury Heavy Duty	United States, Canada
Midwest Automotive Designs	WorkStar Supertruck		Luxury Heavy Duty	United States, Canada
Icon	Thriftmaster		Compact	United States, Canada
Icon	FJ45		Off-Road Compact	United States, Canada
Legacy Classic Trucks	Power Wagon		Heavy Duty	Worldwide
Phoenix Motorcars	SUT		Electric Compact	USA, Canada
SportChassis	Freightliner SportChassis RHA Series		Luxury Heavy Duty	United States, Canada
SportChassis	Freightliner SportChassis P2 Series		Luxury Heavy Duty	United States, Canada
SportChassis	Freightliner Sportchassis P4-XL		Luxury Heavy Duty	United States, Canada
VIA	VIA VTrux		Electric Full-size	United States, Canada
Workhorse	W-15		Electric Full-size	United States

== Discontinued ==
Company	Pickup truck	Image	Class	Years produced
AvtoVAZ	VAZ-2329		Compact	1995–2019
Brabus	Brabus G-Class AMG 6x6		Luxury Heavy Duty	2013–2015
BAW	BJ2032 SAQ 4-dr HT		Compact	????–????
BAW	BAW Yueling		Full-size	????–2017
Bohse	Eurostar			1987–1989
Cadillac	Escalade EXT		Full-size	2002–2013
Chevrolet	AK		Compact	1941–1947
Chevrolet	Advance Design		Compact	1947–1955
Chevrolet	Task Force		Full-size	1955–1960
Chevrolet	C/K		Full-size	1960–2002
Chevrolet	LUV		Compact	1972–2005
Chevrolet	El Camino		Coupe	1959–1987
Chevrolet	Chevy 500		Coupe	1983–1994
Chevrolet	D-20		Compact	1985–1996
Chevrolet	S-10 EV		Compact	1997–1998
Chevrolet	SSR		Unknown	2003–2006
Chevrolet	Avalanche		Full-size	2001–2013
Chevrolet	Chevrolet Kodiak		Heavy-Duty/Medium-Duty	2003–2009
Dacia	Duster Pick-Up		Compact	2020–2024
Dacia	Pick-Up		Compact	1975–2006
Dacia	Logan Pickup		Coupe	2007–2012
Dadi	Bliss		Compact	2007–2012
Datsun	Truck		Compact	1955–1986
Daihatsu	Hi-Line		Compact	1960–1972
Dodge	T-, V-, W-Series		Full-size	1939–1947
Dodge	B-Series		Full-size	1948–1953
Dodge	M37		Full-size	1951–1968
Dodge	C-Series		Full-size	1954–1960
Dodge	D-Series		Full-size	1961–1993
Dodge	Ram 50/D50		Compact	1979–1996
Dodge	Rampage		Coupe	1982–1984
Dodge	Dakota		Mid-size	1987–2011
Dodge	Ram SRT-10		Full-size	2004–2006
Dodge	Ram Rumble Bee		Full-size	2000–2005
EMC	Electric Truck		Electric Coupe	2010–????
Fiat Automobiles	Fiorino		Compact	1977–2013
Fisker	Alaska		Electric Mid-size	Cancelled
Fiat	Fullback		Mid-size	2016–2019
Foday	Lion F22		Mid-size	2015–2020
Ford	F-150 Lightning		Luxury/Full-size	2022–2025
Ford	F-1000		Full-size	1979–1998
Ford	F-4000		Heavy Duty	1999–2019
Ford	Courier		Coupe	1998–2013
Ford	Falcon Ute		Coupe	1960–2016
Ford	Model T Pickup		Compact	1925–1927
Ford	Pampa		Coupe	1982–1997
Ford	P100		Coupe	1971–1993
Ford	Ranchero		Coupe	1957–1979
Ford	North American Ford Ranger		Compact	1983–2012; not counting 2019 reintroduction
Ford	Explorer Sport Trac		Mid-size	2000–2010
Ford	Bantam		Coupe	1983–2011
Ford Performance Vehicles	GS		Coupe	2009–2014
Ford Performance Vehicles	F6		Sport Coupe	2005–2014
Ford Performance Vehicles	Pursuit		Sport Coupe	2003–2010, 2012
FSO	FSO Warszawa Pickup		Compact	1958–1973
FSO/FSM	FSM Syrena R-20		Compact	1972–1983
FSO	125p Pick-up		Compact	1975–1991
FSO	Polonez Truck		Compact	1988–2003
GAZ	GAZ-415		Compact	1939–1941
GMC	Caballero		Coupe	1978–1987
GMC	Sonoma		Compact	1982–2004
GMC	Sprint		Coupe	1971–1977
GMC	Syclone		Compact	1991
GMC	TopKick		Heavy-Duty/Medium-Duty	2003–2009
Gonow	GA200		Compact	2009–2012
Great Wall	Deer		Compact	1996–2013
Great Wall	SoCool		Compact	2003–2010
Great Wall	Sailor		Full-size	2001–2010
Great Wall	Wingle 3		Full-size	2006–2010
Great Wall	Wingle 5		Full-size	2010–2021
Great Wall	Wingle 6		Full-size	2010–2021
Higer	Yujun		Mid-size	2011-2014
Higer	Longwei		Mid-size	2013-
Hino	Briska		Compact	April 1961–1965
Holden	Colorado		Mid-size	2008–2020
Holden	Drover		mini	1985–1987
Holden	One-tonner		Coupe	1971–2005
Holden	Rodeo		Compact	1980–2008
Holden	Sandman		Coupe	1974–1980
Holden	Utility		Coupe	1951–2000
Holden	Ute		Coupe	2000–2017
Holden Special Vehicles	Maloo		Coupe	1990–2017
Honda	Acty		mini	1977–2021
Huanghai	Major		Compact	2004-2015
Huanghai	N3		Mid-size	2017-2020
Huanghai	Plutus		Mid-size	2007-2016
Hudson	Various			1914–1957
Hummer	H1		Full-size	1992–2006
Hummer	H2 SUT		Full-size	2005–2009
Hummer	H3T		Mid-size	2005–2009
Hyundai	Pony Pickup		Coupe	1982–1990
IAME	Rastrojero		Compact	1952–1979
IFA	353 Trans; 1.3 Trans		Compact	1968–1991
International	Harvester K and KB Series		full-size	1940–1949
International	Harvester L-Series			1949–1952
International	Harvester R-Series			1952–1955
International	Harvester S-Series			1955–1957
International	Harvester A-Series			1957–1959
International	Harvester B-Series			1959–1961
International	Harvester C-Series			1961–1968
International	Harvester D-Series		Mid-size	1969–1975
International	CXT		Large	2004–2008
International	MXT		Large	2007–2008
Iran Khodro	Bardo		Compact	1969–2015
Isuzu	Faster			1972-2002
Iveco	Massif Pickup		Off-Road Compact	2007–2011
Izh	Izh-27151		Compact	1974–1997
Jeep	Gladiator		Full-size	1962–1988
Jeep	Jeepster Commando		Convertible	1966–1973
Jeep	CJ-8		Compact	1981–1986
Jeep	Comanche (MJ)		Compact	1985–1992
Kaicene	F300		Compact	
Karry	Aika		Compact	2012-2017
Kawei	K1		Mid-size	2014-2018
Land Rover	Defender Pickup		Off-Road Compact	1983–2016
Leopaard	CT7		Mid-size	2016–2020
Lincoln	Blackwood		Luxury Full-size	2002–2003 (2003; Mexico only)
Lincoln	Mark LT		Luxury Full-size	2006–2008 (U.S. and Canada); 2006–2014 (Mexico)
Lordstown	Endurance		Electric Full-size	2022–2023
Mahindra	Genio		Mid-size	2011–2016
Mazda	B-Series		Mid-size	1961–2006
Mercedes-Benz	G-Class AMG 6x6		Luxury Heavy Duty	2013–2015 limited run (100 made)
Mercedes-Benz	X-Class		Luxury/Mid-size	2017–2020
Mitsubishi	Raider		Mid-size	2005–2009
Morris	Coupé Utility		Compact	1972–1980
Nissan	1400		Compact	1971–2008
Nissan	Junior		Mid-size	1956–1982
Nissan	Hardbody		Compact	1986–2008
Nissan	NP200		Coupe	2009–2024
Nissan	Titan		Luxury/Full-size	2003–2024
Opel	Campo		Compact	1988–2002
Opel	Corsa Utility		Coupe	1992–2006
Peugeot	404 Pickup		Compact	1967–1988
Peugeot	504 Pickup		Compact	1980–2009
Peugeot	Hoggar		Coupe	2010–2014
Plymouth	Arrow Truck		Compact	1979–1982
Powell	Sport Wagon		Coupe	1954–1957
Prince	Miler	Mid-size	1957–1970	
Proton	Arena		Coupe	2002–2010
Reliant	Fox		Coupe	1983–1990
Renault	Alaskan		Mid-size	2016–2025
Renault	Oroch		Compact	2015–2026
SAIPA	Pick-up		mini	Unknown
Shelby	Dakota		Mid-size	1989
Škoda	Favorit Pickup		Coupe	1991–1995
Škoda	Felicia Fun		Coupe	1994–2001
SsangYong	Musso Sports		Mid-size	2002–2005
SsangYong	Actyon Sports		Compact	2006–2018
Subaru	BRAT		Coupe	1978–1994
Subaru	Baja		Mid-size	2002–2006
Suzuki	Carry		mini	1961–1991
Suzuki	Caribian		mini	
Suzuki	Equator		Mid-size	2009–2013
Suzuki	Mighty Boy		Coupe	1983–1988
Suzuki	Jimny		mini	
Sterling Trucks	Bullet		Heavy-Duty	2008–2010
Studebaker	E-series truck		Full-size	1953–1963
Studebaker	Champ		Mid-size	1960–1964
Studebaker	Coupe Express		Compact	1937–1939
Studebaker	M-series truck			1940–19--
Studebaker	Scotsman			1958–1959
Studebaker	Transtar			1956–1958, 1960–63
Toyota	LiteAce Truck		Mini	1970–2008
Toyota	Briska		Compact	April 1961–1965
Toyota	Stout		Compact	April 1954–1986
Toyota	Toyopet SB		Compact	1947–1952
Toyota	SG		Compact	March 1952–1954
Toyota	T100		Full-size	1993–1998
Trekka				1966–1972
Troller	Pantanal		Compact	2006–2008
Vauxhall	Brava		Compact	1988–2002
Vauxhall	Maloo VXR		Coupe	
VIS Avto	VIS-2345		Compact	1995–2011
VIS Avto	VIS-2347		Compact	2002–2014
Volkswagen	Caddy		Coupe	1979–2004
Volkswagen/Toyota/Hino	Taro		Compact	1981–1997
Willys/Kaiser Jeep	Willys Jeep Truck		Midsize	1947–1965
Wuling	Zhengtu		Mid-size	2021–2025
Zastava	Skala Poly		Compact	1983–2010
Zastava	Florida Poly		Compact	1998–2010
ZAZ	ZAZ-968MP Zaporozhets		Coupe	1990–1994
ZAZ	ZAZ-11055 Tavria Pick-Up		Coupe	1992–2011
ZAZ	ZAZ Lanos Pick-Up/Cargo		Coupe	2005–2017
Zotye	S Series		Compact	????–????
ZX	Admiral		Compact	2000–2010

== Concept models ==
Company	Pickup truck	Image	Production	Class	Note(s)
Chevrolet	Cheyenne		2003	Full-size	The Chevrolet Silverado is sold as the Chevrolet Cheyenne in Mexico.
Chevrolet	Silverado ZR2		????	Full-size	-
Dodge	M80		2002	Compact	Styling recalls elements from 1930's and 1940's Dodge trucks.
Dodge	MAXXcab		2000	Full-size	-
Dodge	Sidewinder		1997	Coupe	It is powered by the same engine that was used in the Chrysler Viper GTS-R.
Dodge	T-Rex		1997	Full-size	6x6 based on the Dodge Ram.
Ford	Atlas		2013	Full-size	Concept for the 13th generation Ford F150.
Ford	F-250 Super Chief		2006	Heavy Duty	-
Ford	Mighty F-350 Tonka		2002	Heavy Duty	-
Ford	Powerstroke		1994	Full-size	-
Ford	Scrambler		1969	Coupe	-
GMC	Denali XT		2008	Coupe	-
GMC	Sierra All Terrain HD Concept		????	Full-size	-
GMC	Terradyne		2000	Full-size	-
Holden	SST		2004	Coupe	-
Holden	UTEster		2001	Convertible	-
Honda	Sport Utility Truck Concept		2005	Mid-size	-
Jeep	2005 Gladiator Concept		2005	Mid-size	-
Nissan	Alpha-T		2001	Full-size	-
Mercedes-Benz	X-Class		????	Mid-size	-
Ram	5500 Long Hauler		2011		-
Toyota	A-BAT		2007	Compact	-
Toyota	FTX		2004	Full-size	-
Toyota	X-Runner		2003	Coupe	-
Volkswagen	Atlas Tanoak		2018	Mid-size	Based on the Volkswagen Atlas SUV.
Volkswagen	Tarok		2018	Compact	-
Volvo Trucks	VHD Crew Cab		????	Heavy Duty	-
Yamaha	Cross Hub		2017	Compact	-

== See also ==
- Electric truck § Pickup trucks
