= SG Automotive =

Chinese automotive company

SG Automotive Group Co., Ltd.
- Type: Public
- Traded as: SSE: 600303
- Industry: Automotive
- Headquarters: Dandong, Liaoning, China
- Products: Passenger cars, buses, automotive components
- Subsidiaries: Huanghai Bus
- Website: http://www.sgautomotive.com

SG Automotive
- Simplified Chinese: 辽宁曙光汽车集团
- Traditional Chinese: 遼寧曙光汽車集團
- Literal meaning: SG Automotive Group Co., Ltd.
Transcriptions
Standard Mandarin
- Hanyu Pinyin: Liáoníng shǔguāng qìchē jítuán

SG Automotive Group Co Ltd (officially Liaoning Shuguang Automotive Group, Ltd) is a Chinese vehicle and component manufacturer headquartered in Dandong, Liaoning province. The company makes buses, light trucks, semi-trailer trucks, SUVs and automotive components. Auto parts made by SG are used by other Chinese car makers including Brilliance Auto, Chery, and JAC Motors.

Light trucks and buses are sold under the Huanghai (黄海, lit. "Yellow Sea") brand name, whilst the Shuguang brand was used for SUVs in the early 2000s. Some SUVs sold under this brand may utilize Mitsubishi engines as of 2011. The company makes fleet sales, and some products are purchased by the Chinese State.

== History ==
SG was founded in Liaoning in 1984 with RMB 70,000 as a manufacturer of axles for off-road vehicles.

At the beginning of 2007, the parent company Shuguang Automobile Group wholly acquired Changzhou Changjiang Bus Manufacturing Co., Ltd., one of Dandong Huanghai's former competitors and the largest bus share in China before 2003, and changed its name to Changzhou Huanghai.

In August 2012, SG agreed to acquire a 56.19% stake in a Dandong-based special vehicle company from a Liaoning-based group company for RMB 80.9 million.

== Operations ==
SG has component manufacturing facilities in Wuhu, Anhui, and Shenyang, Liaoning. Other facilities include a bus-making factory in Changzhou, Changzhou Changjiang Bus, which became operational in early 2010 and a location-unknown component-making facility 113,220 square meters in size that should have become operational in late 2012.

== Products ==
=== Current ===
- 2014-present Huanghai N1
  - Huanghai N1S
- 2015-present Huanghai N2
  - Huanghai N2S
- 2016-present Huanghai Raytour (DD 504)- van - Copy of the Volkswagen Crafter
- 2019-present Huanghai N7 - copy of the Chevrolet Silverado
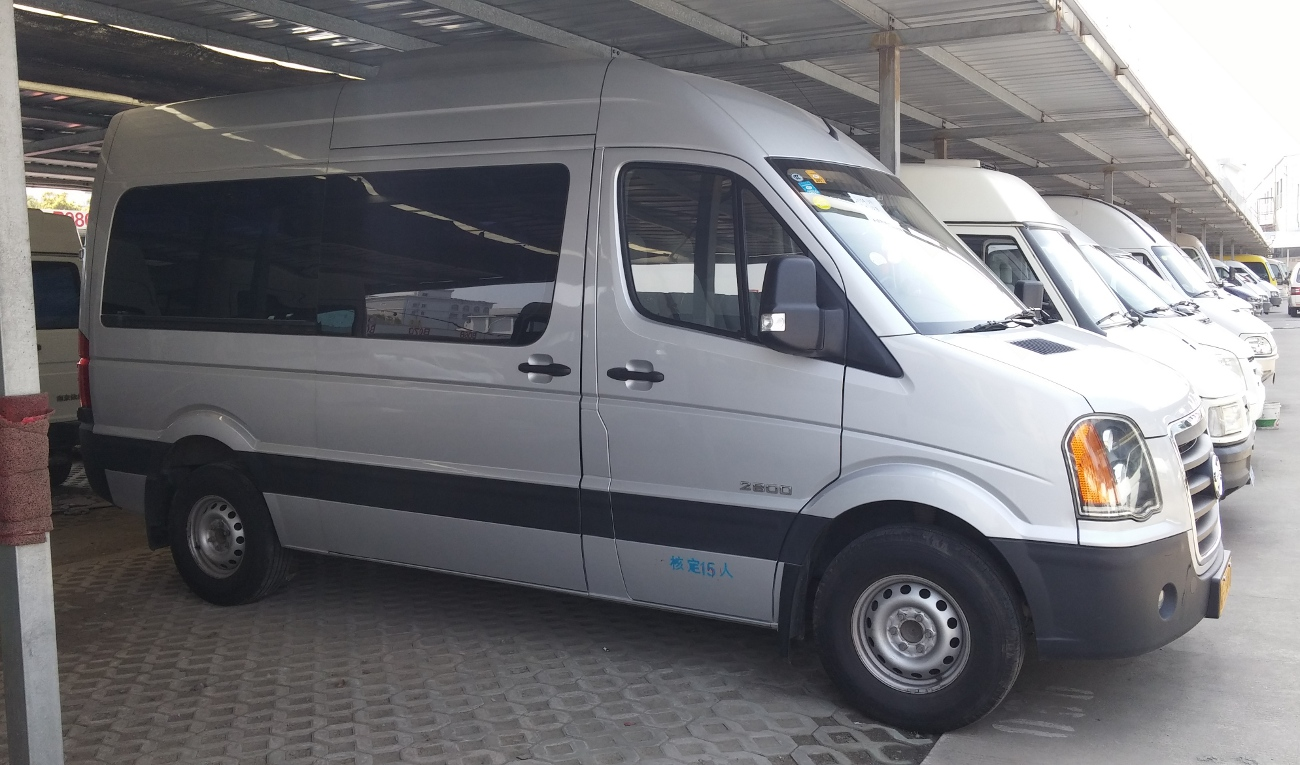
Huanghai Raytour

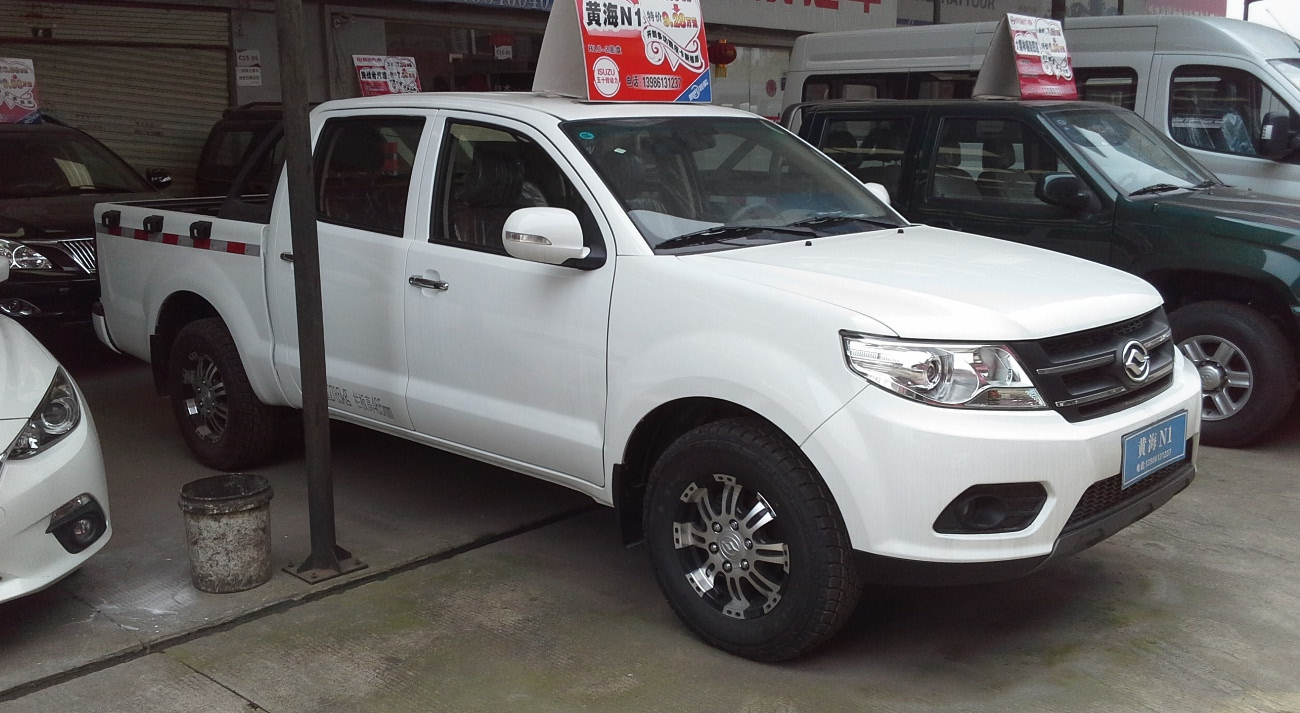
Huanghai N1

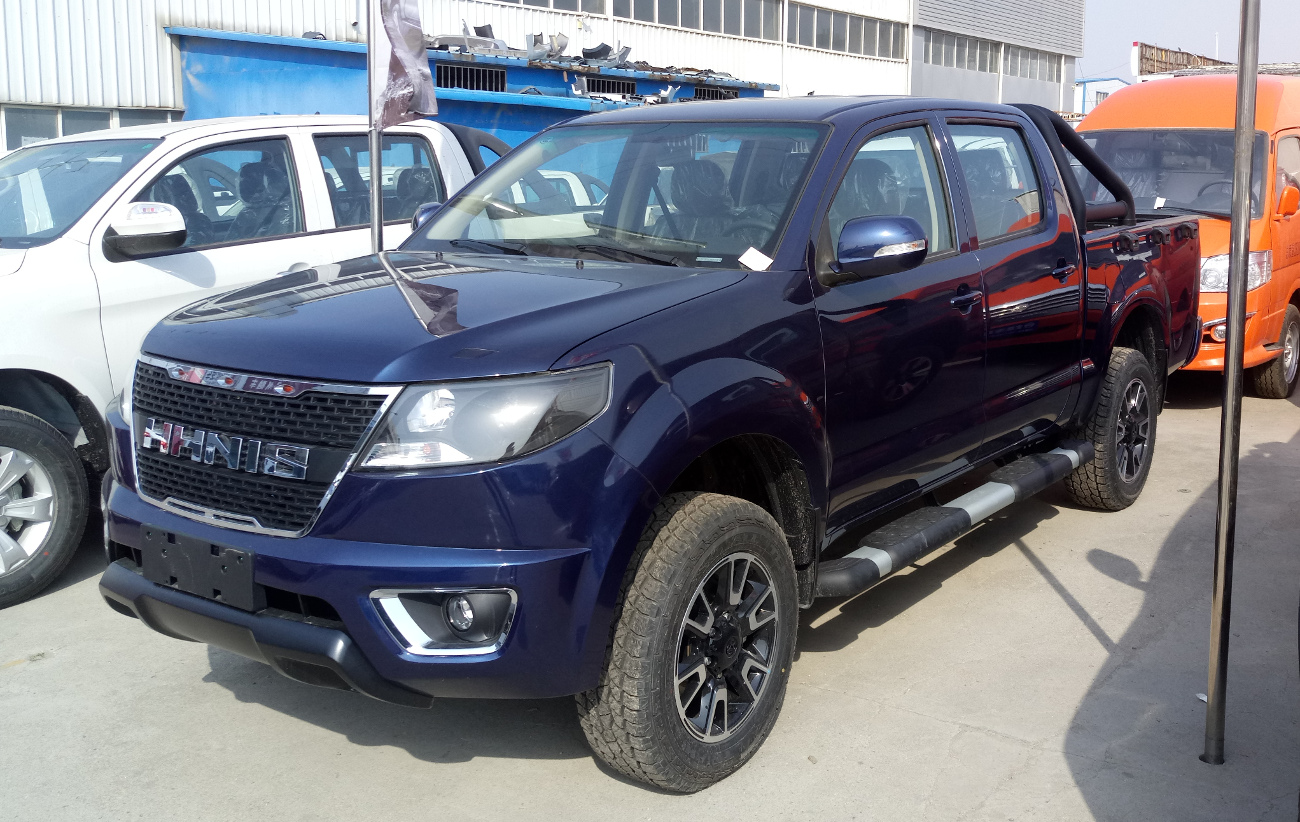
Huanghai N1S

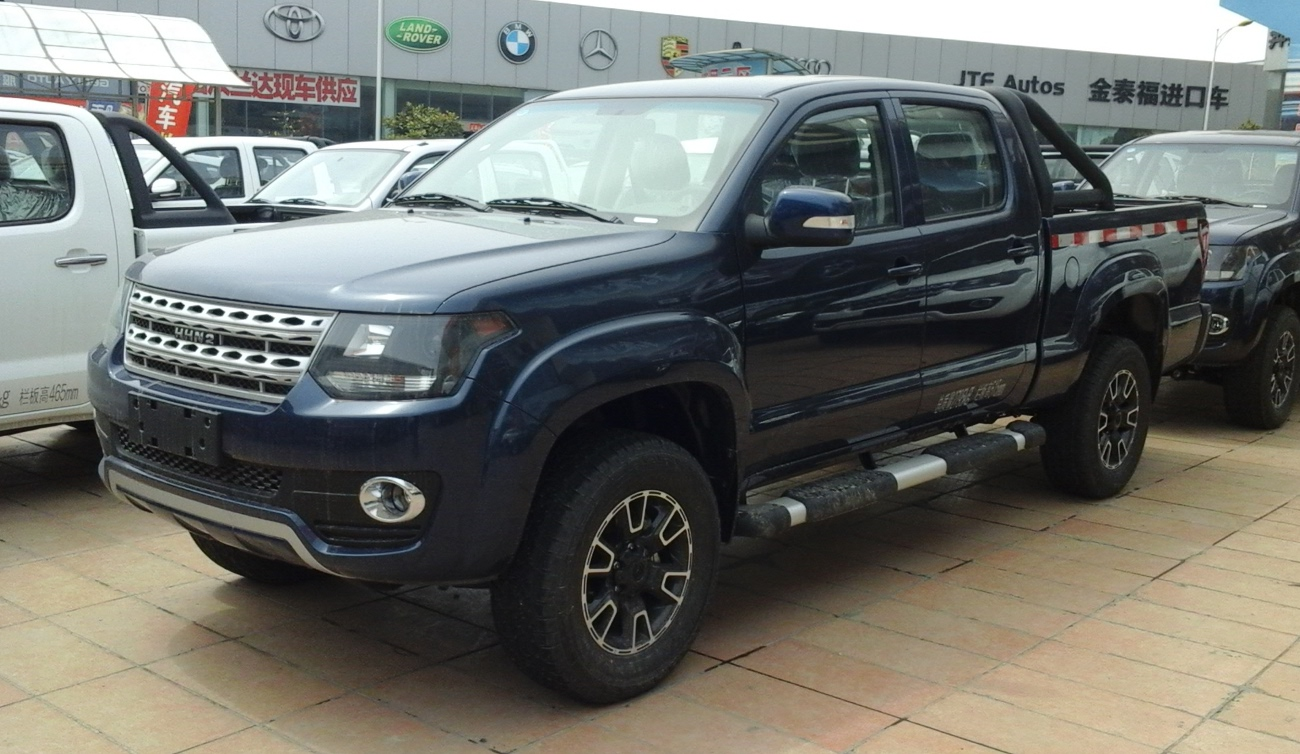
Huanghai N2

=== Former ===
- DG 6471 B
- DG 6400
- 2009-2012 Huanghai Challenger (DD 6490P/DD 6491A/Shuguang Challenger) - SUV - rebadged Gonow Jetstar/Dadi Shuttle
- Huanghai Faster NCV - CUV - Concept based on the Landscape V3 with the front end copied from the Pontiac Torrent previewing the Huanghai Landscape V3.
- 2008-2012 Huanghai Landscape F1 (DD 6460D/DD 6460K/DD 6461A/DD 6470E) - CUV - Copy of Kia Sorento with a front fascia similar to the Mercedes-Benz M-Class
- Huanghai Landscape V3 (DD 6472A/DD 6472B) - CUV - Copy of the Toyota Harrier/Lexus RX450h
- DG 6480 Navigator/Dawn/Falcon
- 2006-2010 Huanghai Aurora (DD 6470/DD 6470H) - CUV - Copy of the SsangYong Rexton
- DG 1020 "Antilope" or "Aolin"
- Huanghai Steed (DD 1020) - pickup truck - Variant of the Plutus
- Shuguang Conqueror (DG6472) - an updated luxury Huanghai Challenger
- Shuguang Runway - a three-door Shuguang Conqueror
- Huanghai Major (DD 1023) - pickup truck - Copy of the Toyota Tacoma
- 2017-2020 Huanghai N3
- 2007-2016 Huanghai Plutus (DD 1022) - pickup truck - Copy of the Chevrolet Colorado
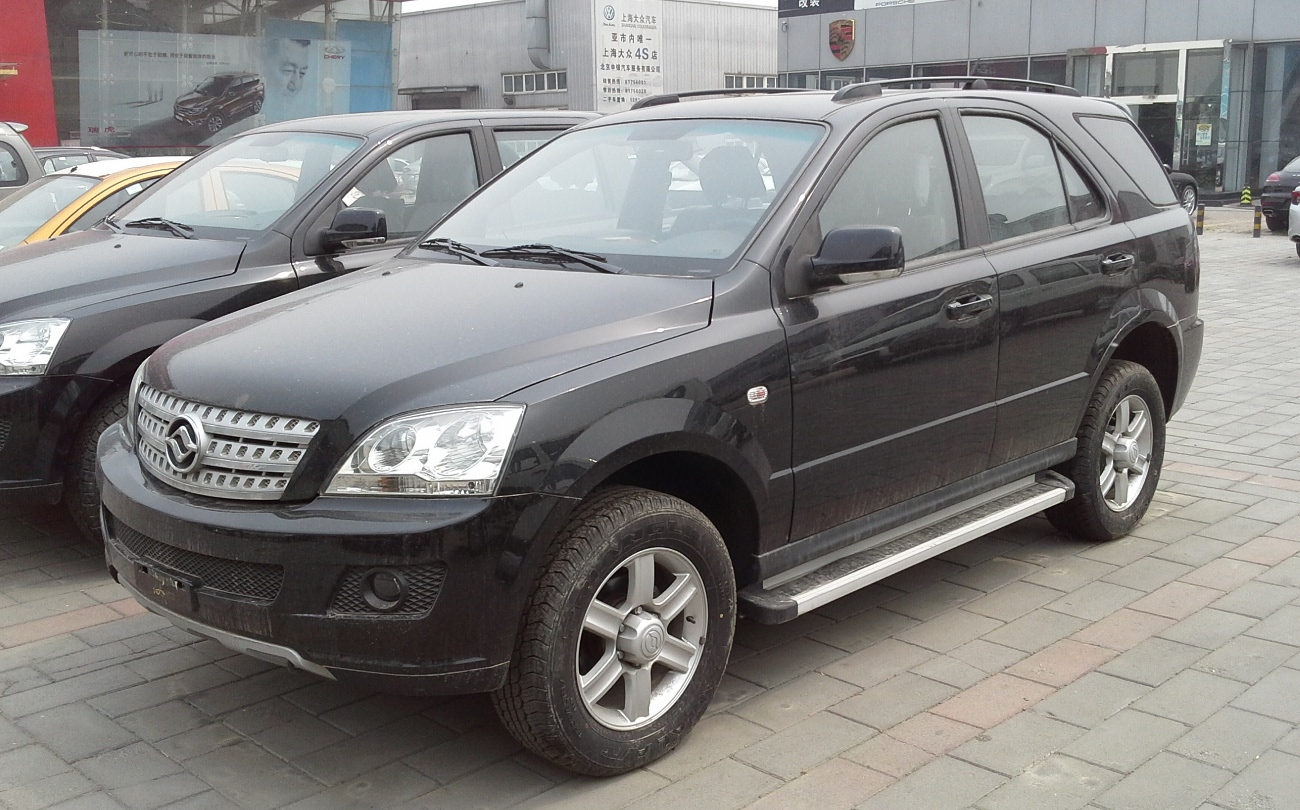
Huanghai Landscape F1

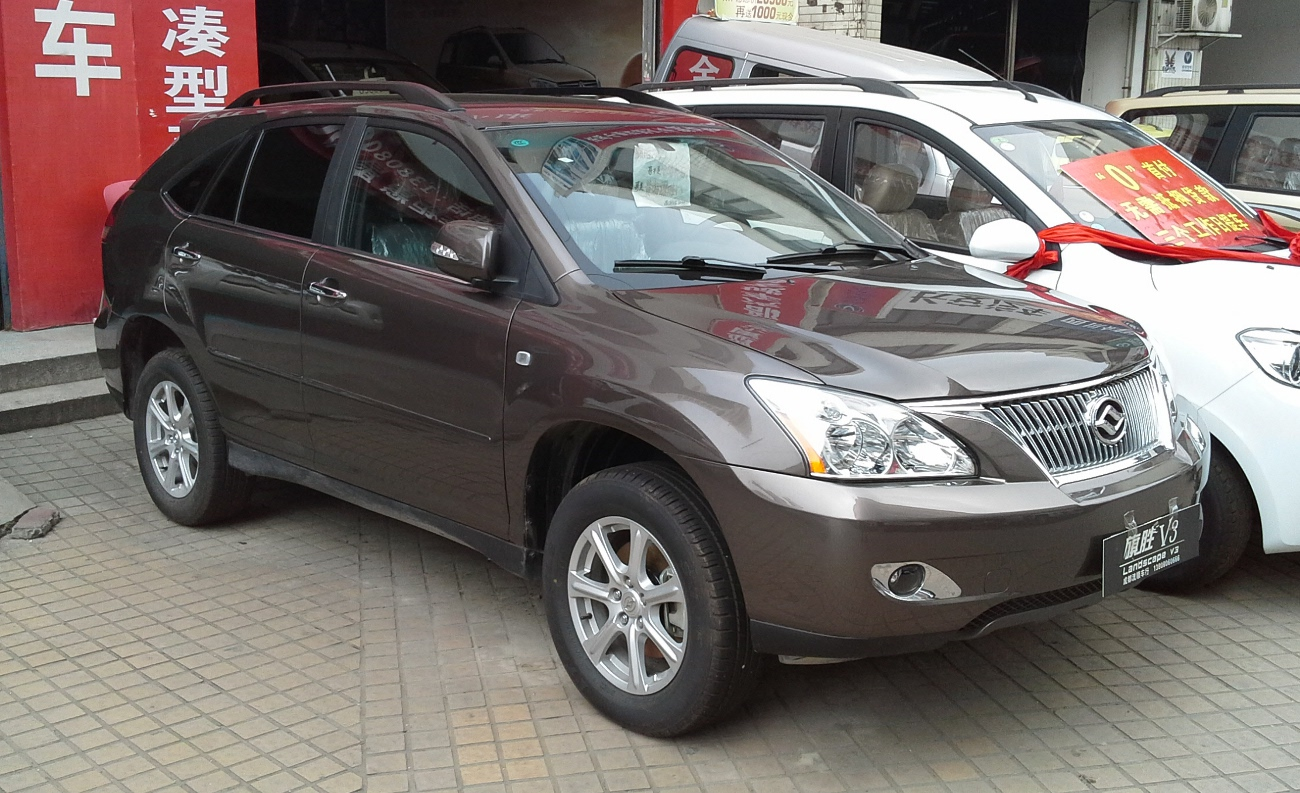
Huanghai Landscape V3

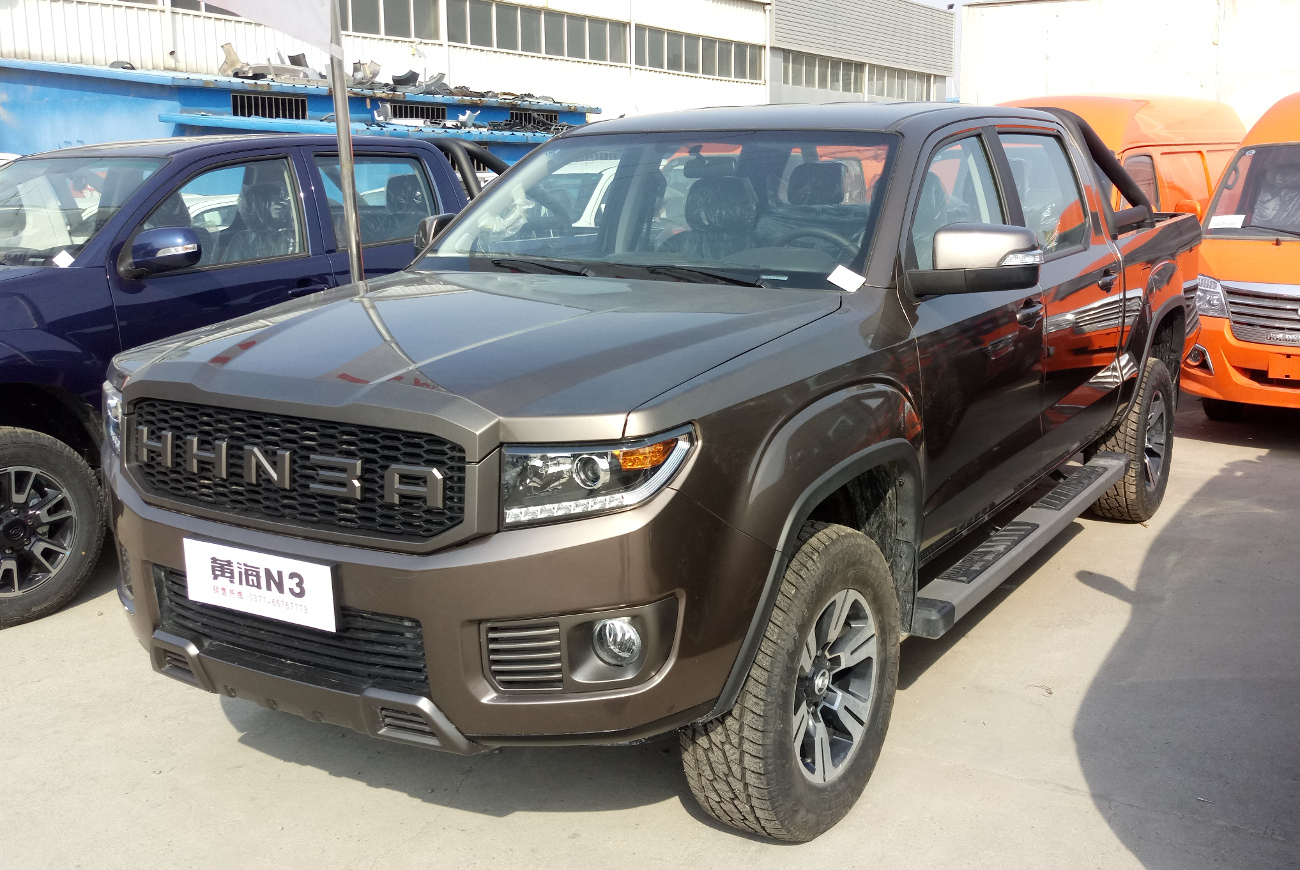
Huanghai N3A

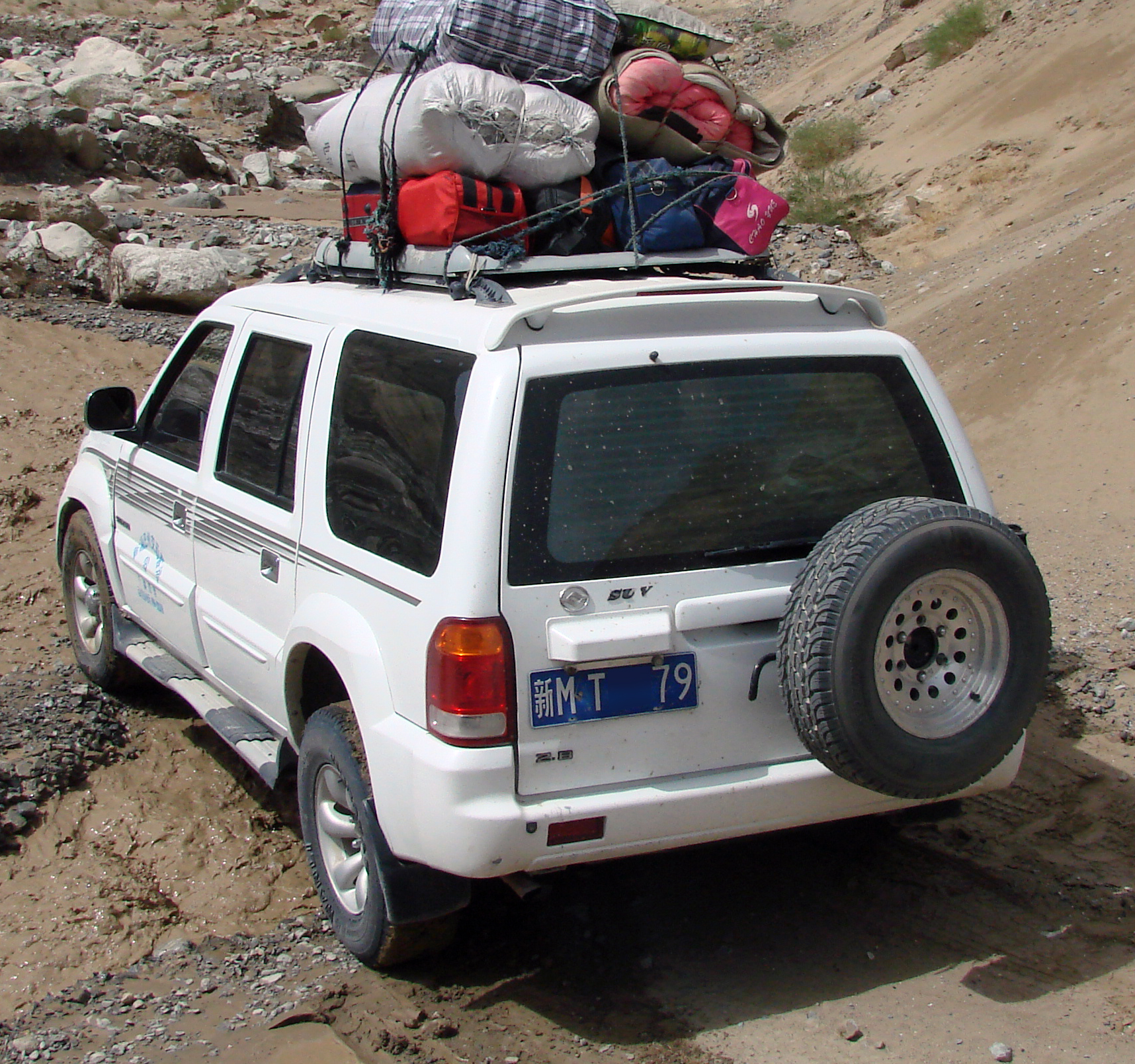
SG 6480 "Dawn" in the Taklamakan

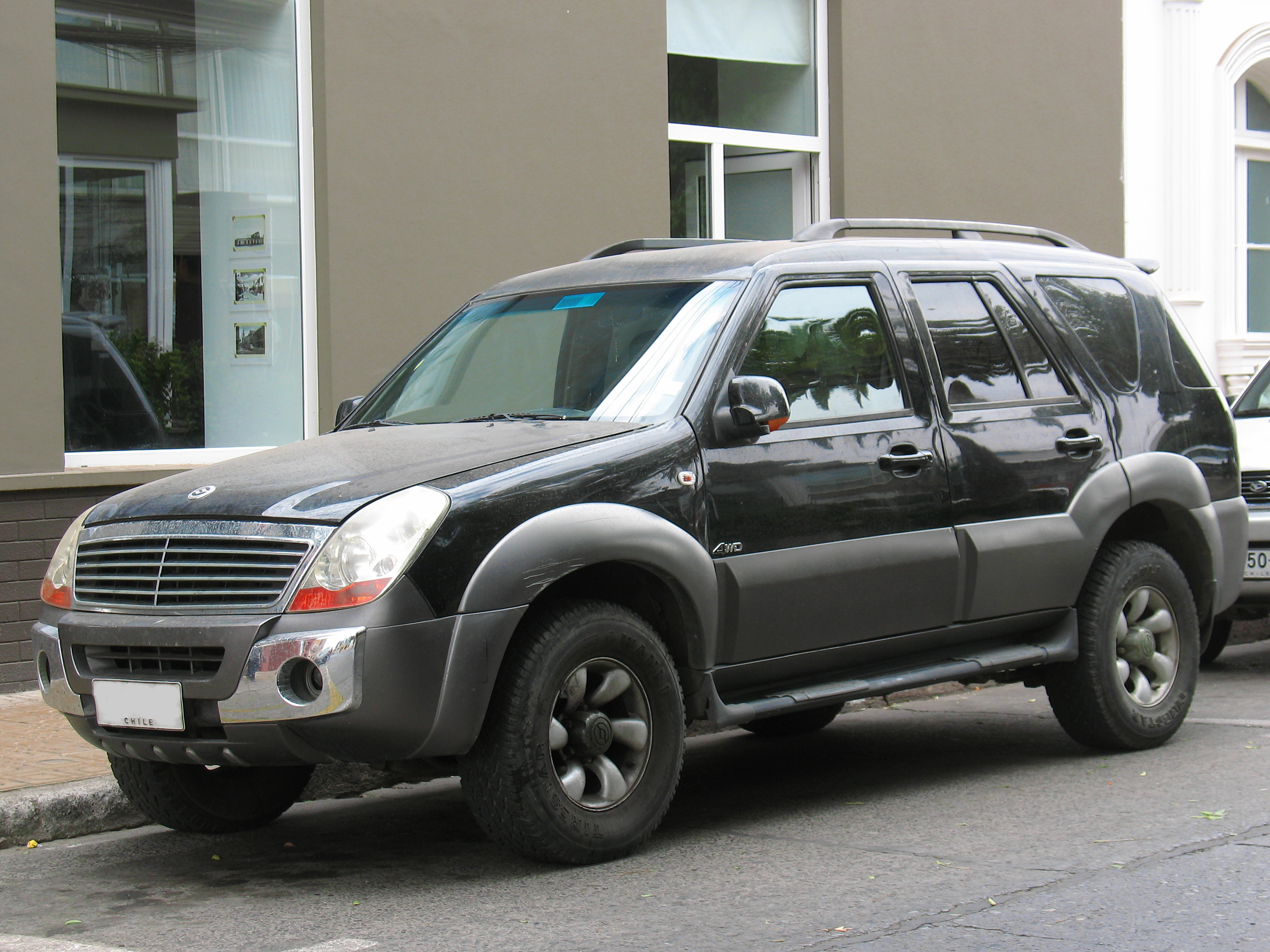
Huanghai Aurora

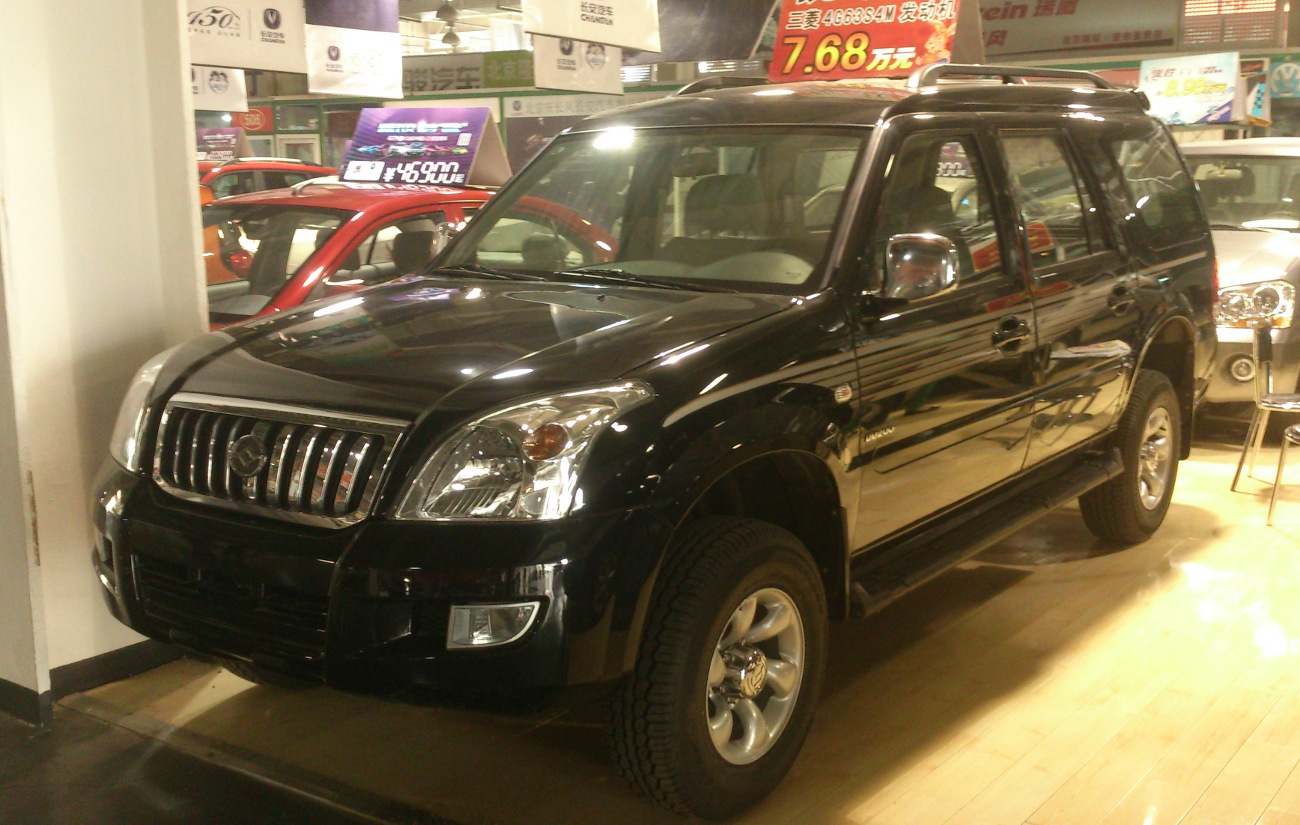
Huanghai Challenger

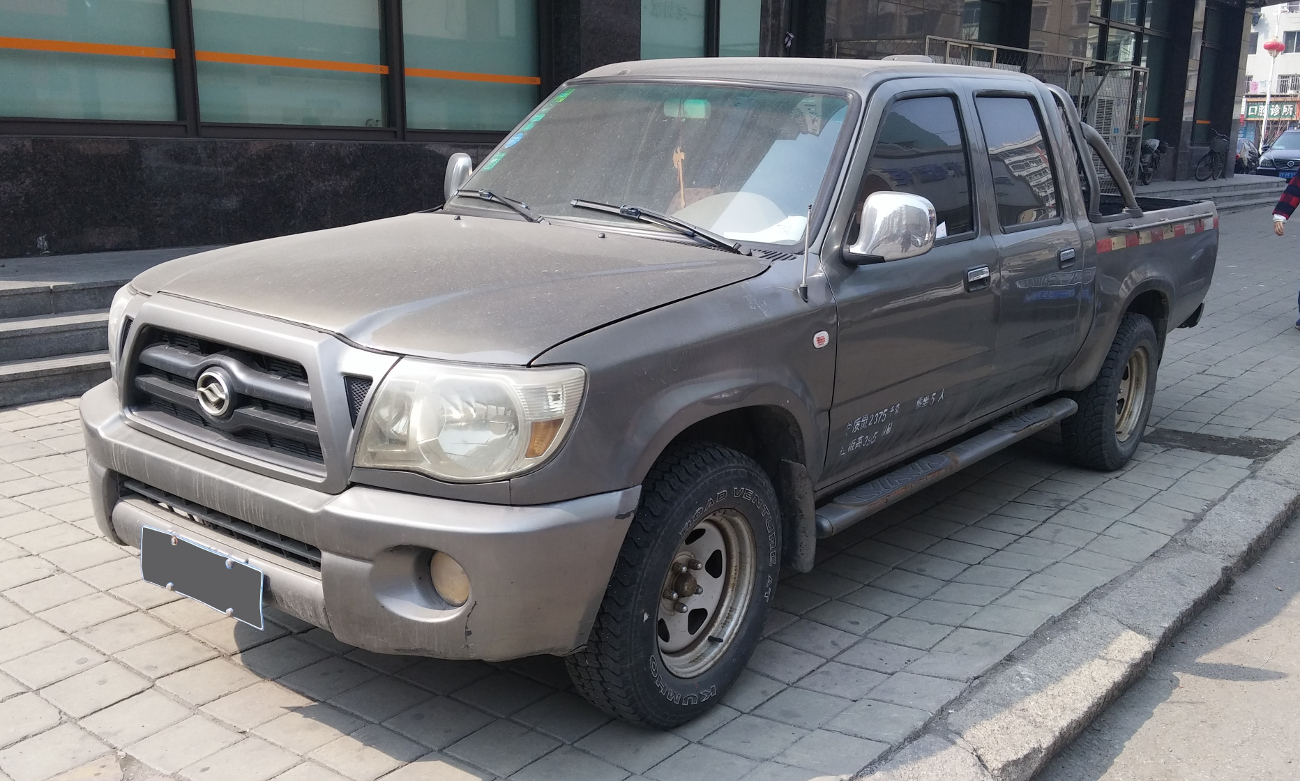
Huanghai DD1023

== Export sales ==
SG has exported light trucks and buses to countries including Saudi Arabia, South Africa, and Brazil. Some products, including the Plutus and the Steed, are assembled by Effa Motors in Uruguay.

Some of its production has been sold in Malaysia, where the Plutus pick-up was on sale as of late 2012.
