= Huanghai Raytour =

Chinese van

Huanghai Raytour (瑞途)
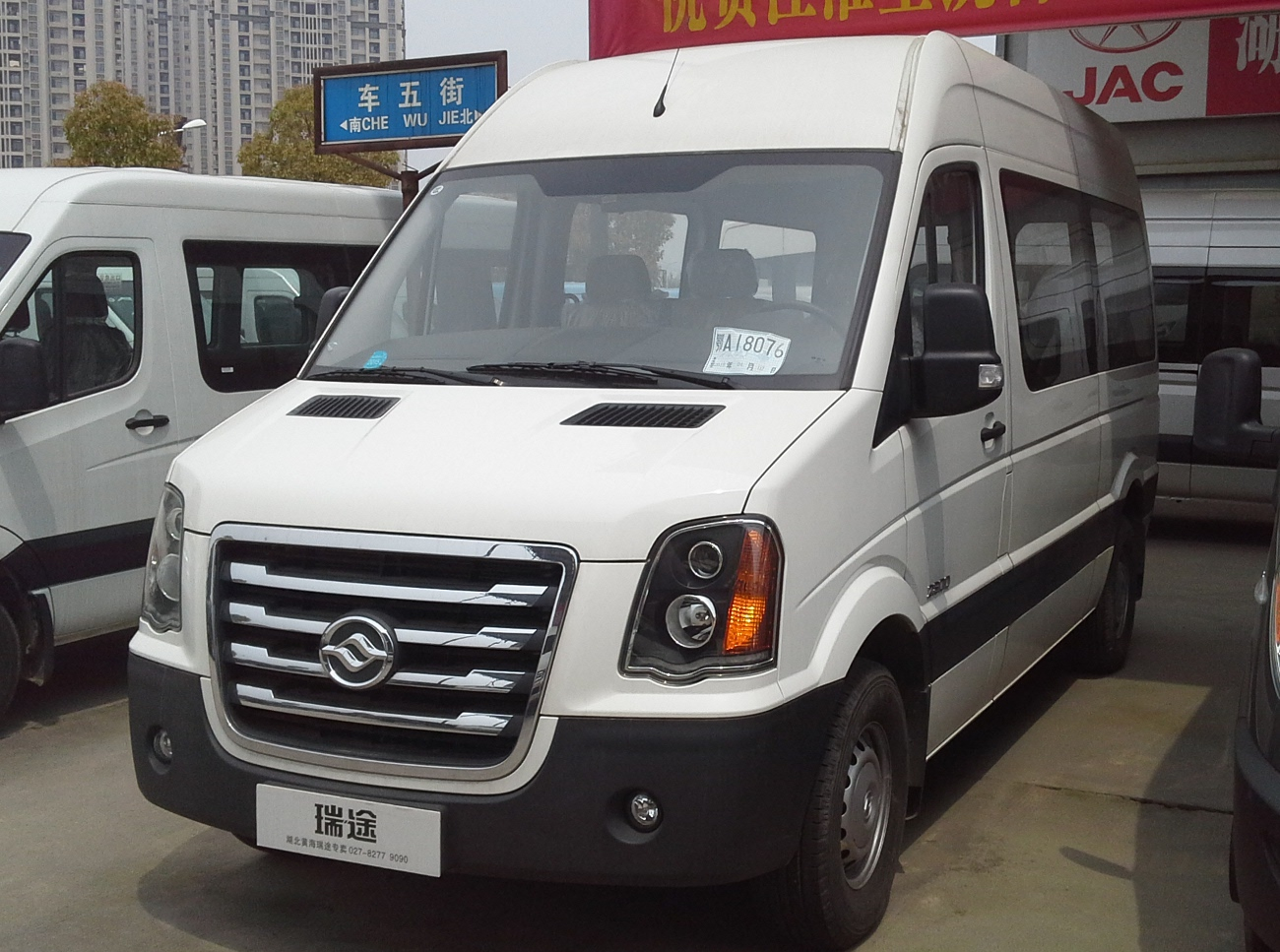

Overview
- Also called: Saggy Naggy (2019-2020); Pyeonghwa Changjeon 0208 (North Korea)
- Production: 2016–present

Body and chassis
- Body style: 4-door van 4-door minibus

Powertrain
- Engine: 2.8L I4 Diesel engine 2.0L Turbo I4 Diesel engine (2020)
- Transmission: 5-speed manual

Dimensions
- Wheelbase: 3,300 mm (129.9 in) (2020); 3,715 mm (146.3 in) (EV)
- Length: 5,295 mm (208.5 in) (2020); 5,930 mm (233.5 in) (EV)
- Width: 2,025 mm (79.7 in)
- Height: 2,375 mm (93.5 in) (2020); 2,650 mm (104.3 in) (EV)

The Huanghai Raytour (Chinese: 瑞途) is a light commercial vehicle (van) produced and sold by SG Automotive (曙光汽车) under the Huanghai Auto (黄海) marque from China. The Huanghai Raytour was introduced in China in 2016 with prices ranging from 168,800 yuan to 298,800 yuan.

== Overview ==
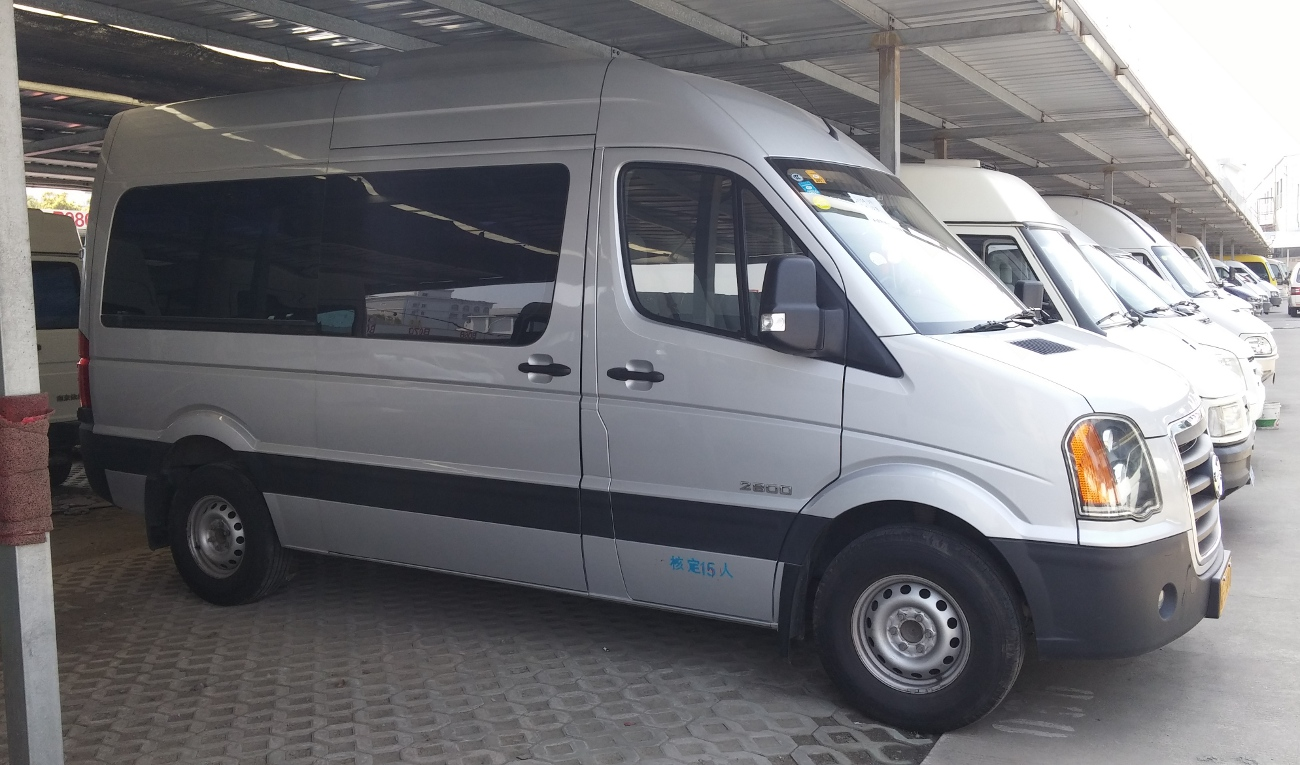
Huanghai Raytour sideview

The Huanghai Raytour is available as both a panel van, and an open window passenger van, with 3-seater, 5-seter, and 6-seater variants available across the range. Power of the Huanghai Raytour Cummins ISF2.8 2.8 liter turbo diesel engine producing 150 hp(110 kW)/3200rpm with a maximum torque of 360N·m/1800-2700rpm, and mated to a 5-speed manual gearbox. The exterior design is controversial as the styling is clearly a reverse engineered design based on the Volkswagen Crafter and the Mercedes Sprinter.

== 2020 facelift and EV variant ==
The 2020 facelift was launched in October 2020 with an additional electric variant introduced. The facelift features a restyled front end and updated ICE models are powered by a 2.0 liter turbo diesel engine developing 122hp and 280N·m mated to a 5-speed manual transmission. The electric variant is powered by a 150hp electric motor developing 360N·m and a 79.9kWh Lithium Manganese Oxide (LMO) battery with a range of 350km.
