= Huanghai Aurora =

Chinese automobile

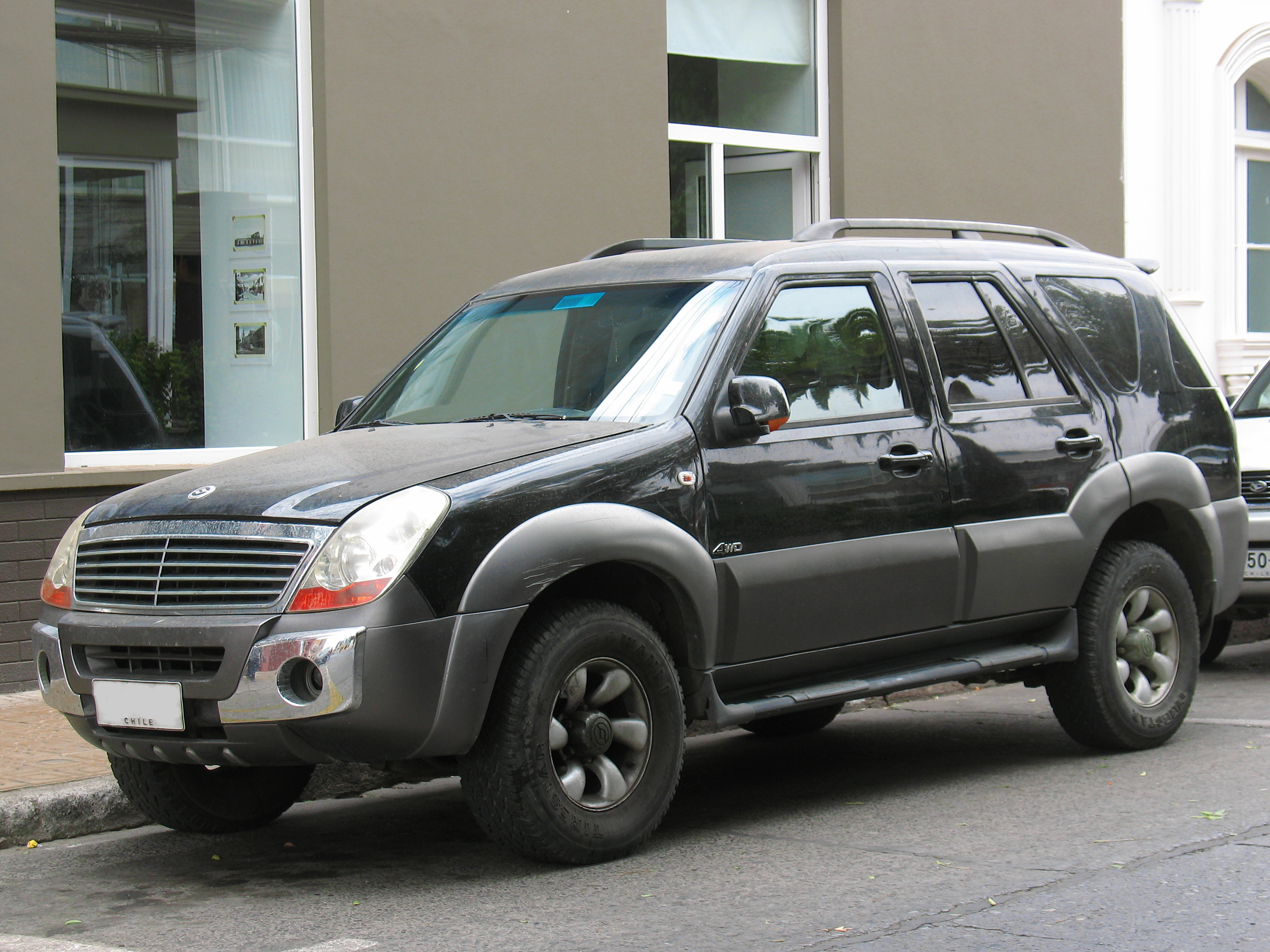

Overview
- Also called: Derways Aurora
- Production: 2006–2010

Powertrain
- Engine: 2.5 L I4 turbo diesel (DD6470H); 2.0 L 4G63S4M petrol; 2.4 L 4G64; S4M petrol (DD6470N)
- Transmission: 5-speed manual

Dimensions
- Wheelbase: 2,730 mm (107.5 in)
- Length: 4,680 mm (184.3 in)
- Width: 1,790 mm (70.5 in)
- Height: 1,870 mm (73.6 in)

The Huanghai Aurora (翱龙, Aolong) is a mid-size SUV manufactured by Huanghai Auto of SG Automotive (曙光汽车) from 2007 to 2012 and marketed from 2006 until 2010.

== Overview ==
Code named DD6470N, the Huanghai Aurora was marketed as a CUV despite being essentially a truck-based SUV with styling heavily inspired by the first generation SsangYong Rexton SUV. Prices of the Huanghai Aurora ranges from 79,800 to 106,800 yuan.

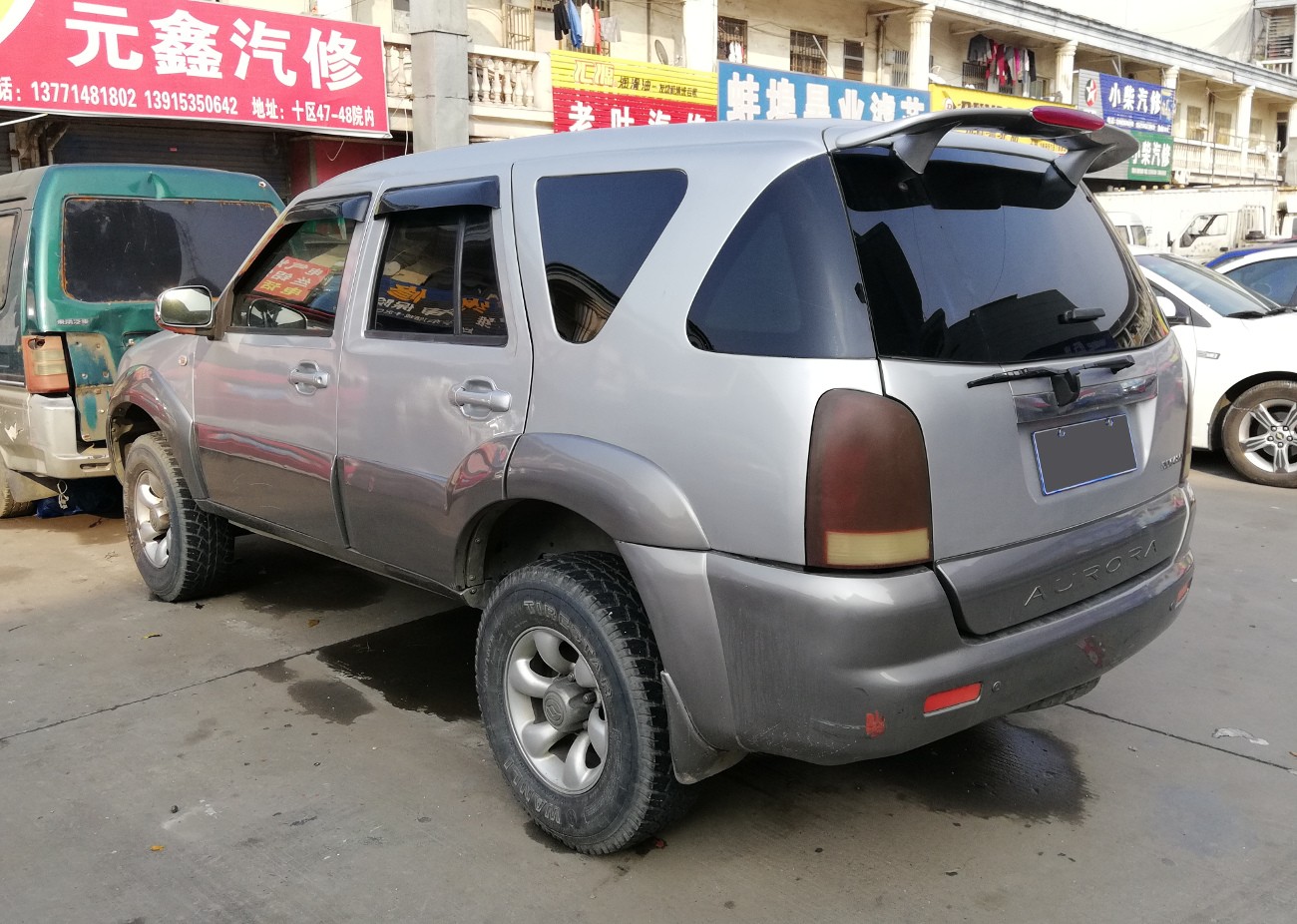
Huanghai Aurora rear
