= Huanghai Landscape V3 =

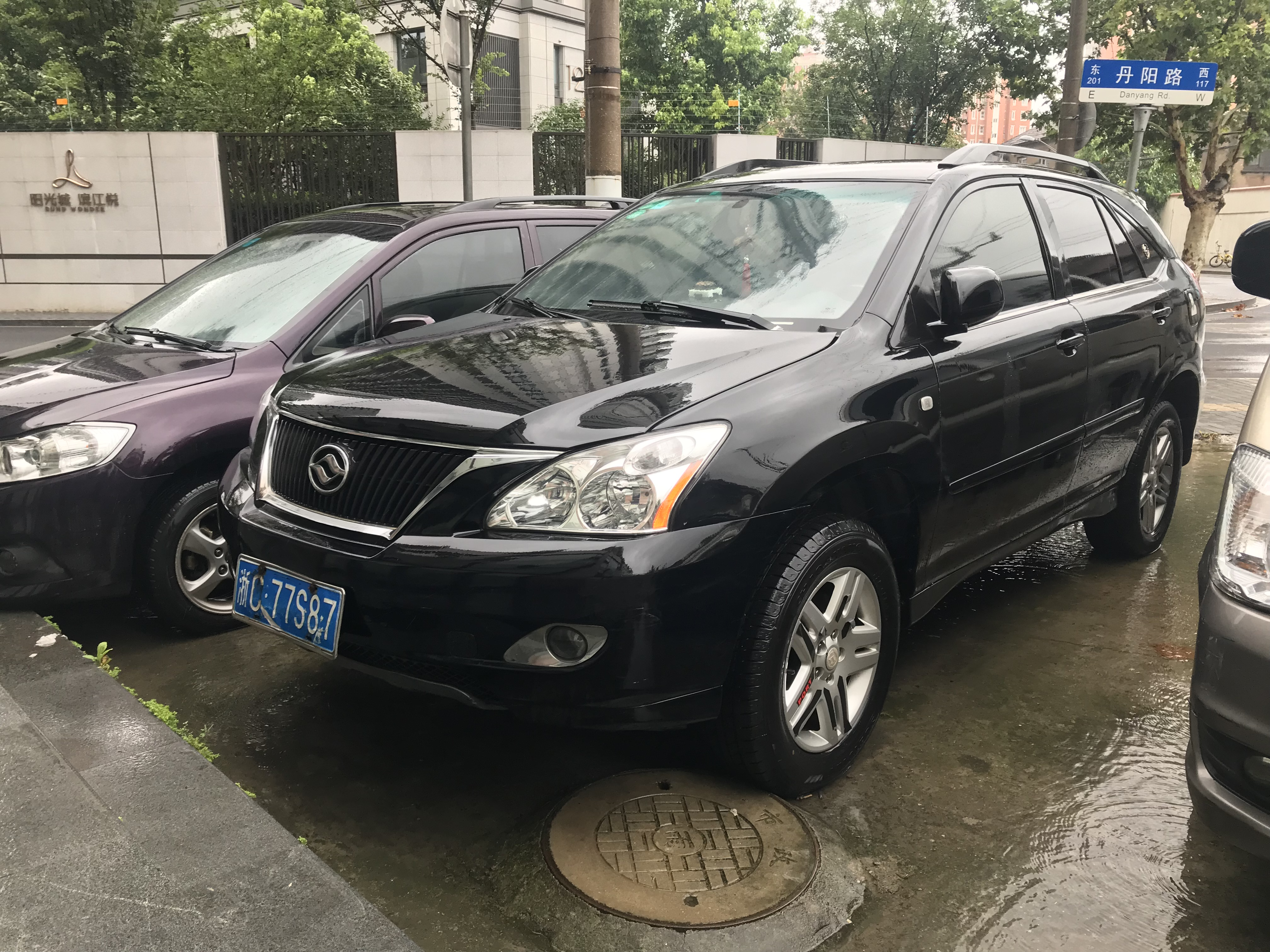
- Huanghai Landscape V3

Overview
- Manufacturer: SG Automotive
- Also called: Huanghai Qisheng V3; Huanghai NCV (concept); Huanghai Faster NCV (concept)
- Production: 2010-2015
- Model years: 2011-2015

Body and chassis
- Class: Mid-size crossover SUV
- Body style: 5-door SUV
- Layout: Front-engine, front-wheel drive; Front-engine, four-wheel drive

Powertrain
- Engine: 2.0 L I4 Petrol engine; 2.4 L I4 Petrol engine; 2.5 L Diesel engine
- Transmission: Powertech ‘5R35’ automated manual 5-speed transmission

Dimensions
- Wheelbase: 107 in (2,730 mm)
- Length: 182 in (4,620 mm)
- Width: 73 in (1,860 mm)
- Height: 72 in (1,830 mm)
- Curb weight: 1360kg

The Huanghai Landscape V3 or Huanghai Qisheng V3 (黄海 旗胜V3), also known as the Huanghai NCV before production, is a mid-size crossover SUV produced and sold by SG Automotive (曙光汽车) under the Huanghai Auto (黄海) marque.

== Overview ==
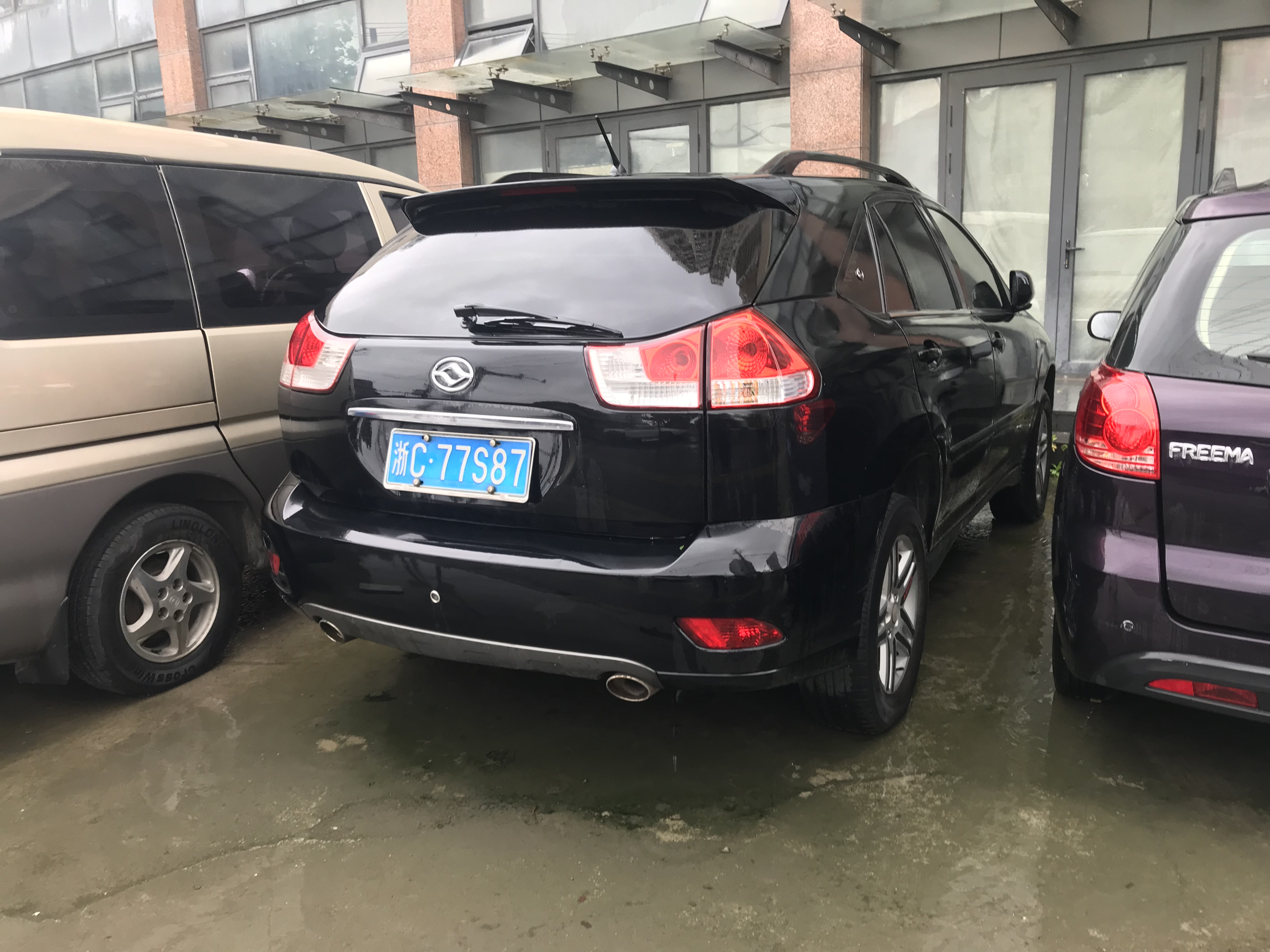
Huanghai Landscape V3 rear

The Huanghai Landscape V3 was revealed during the 2010 Beijing Auto Show with the actual production version launched during the 2011 Shanghai Auto Show with a price range from 105,800 yuan to 119,800 yuan.

=== Powertrain ===
The Huanghai Landscape V3 is offered as either a 4×2 or 4×4. Engine could be had with a 2.0 liter engine, a 2.4 liter engine and a 2.5 liter diesel engine. The 2.4 liter engine has 105kw and 200nm, and a top speed of 160km/h.

=== Design controversies ===
The styling of the Huanghai Landscape V3 was especially controversial as the exterior design is a complete copy of the second generation Lexus RX luxury crossover.
