= Huanghai Major =

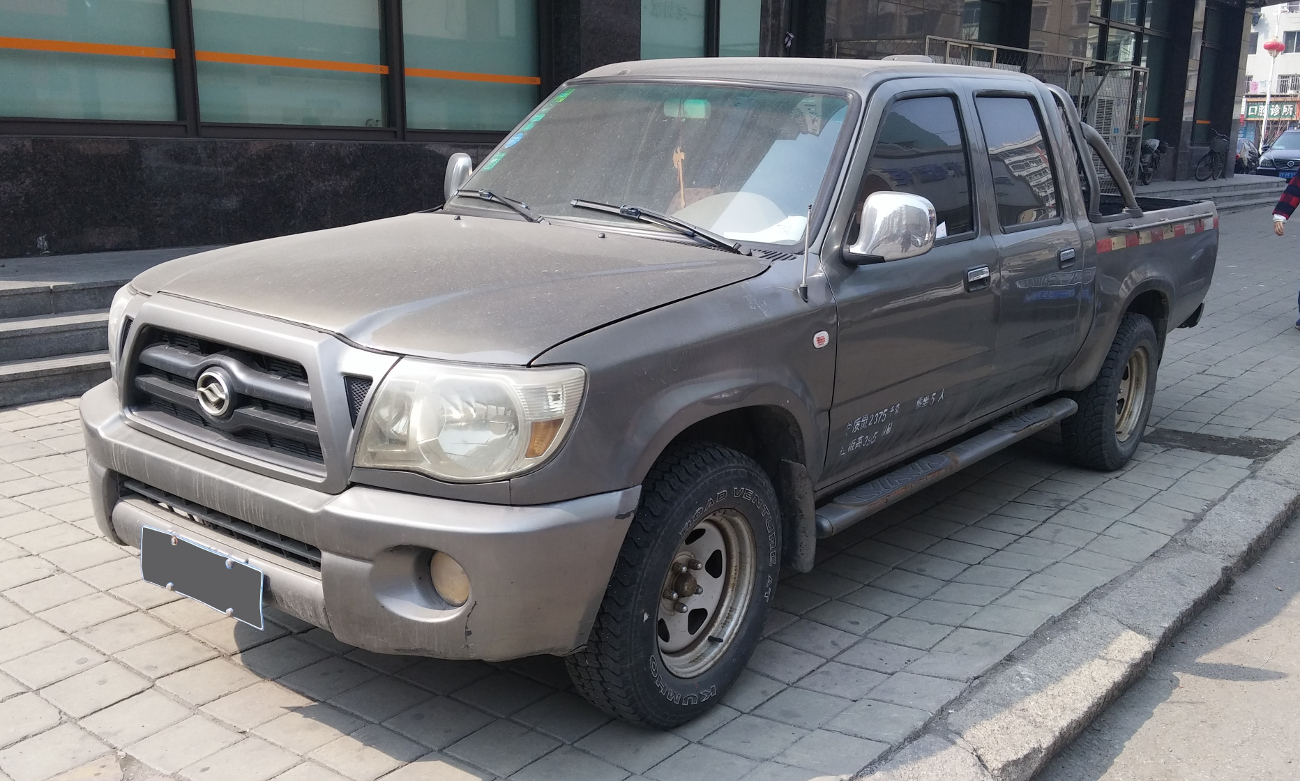

Overview
- Manufacturer: SG Automotive
- Also called: Huanghai DD1023
- Production: August 2004 – August 2015
- Model years: 2007–2012

Body and chassis
- Class: Compact pickup truck
- Layout: Front engine, rear-wheel drive

Powertrain
- Engine: 2.2 L I4; 2.4 L turbo I4
- Transmission: 5-speed manual

Dimensions
- Wheelbase: 3,085 mm (121 in)
- Length: 5,190 mm (204 in)
- Width: 1,730 mm (68 in)
- Height: 1,680 mm (66 in)
- Curb weight: 1,470–1,550 kg (3,241–3,417 lb)

The Huanghai Major (小柴神) is a compact pickup truck manufactured in the China by the Chinese automobile manufacturer SG Automotive from 2007 to 2015.

== Overview ==
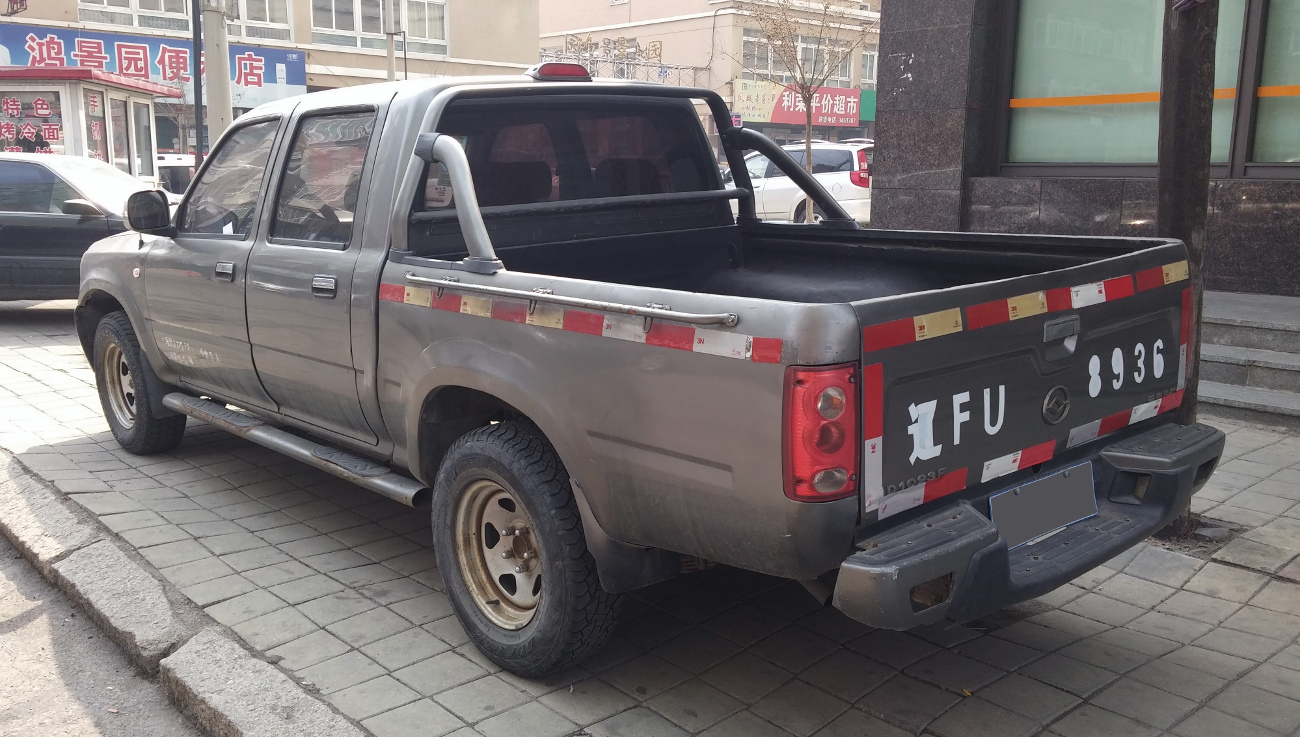
Huanghai Major rear

The Huanghai Major is available with two engines including the 2.2 liter four-cylinder petrol engine producing 103 hp (77 kW) and 193 N⋅m (142 lb⋅ft) of torque, and a 2.4 liter four-cylinder turbo diesel engine producing 88 hp (66 kW) and a torque of 225 N⋅m (166 lb⋅ft), both mated to a 5-speed manual gearbox.

Styling of the Huanghai Major has been controversial as the exterior design heavily resembles the second generation Toyota Tacoma.
