= Huanghai N2 =

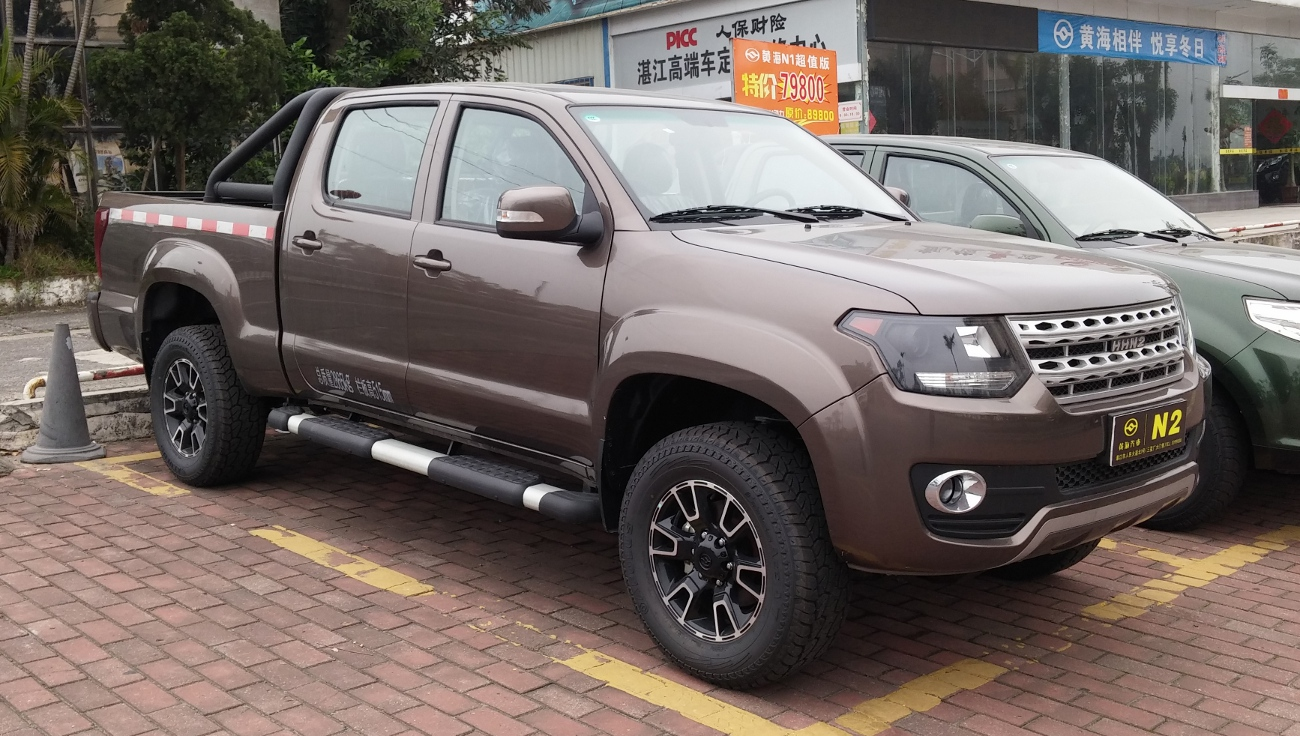
- Huanghai N2

Overview
- Manufacturer: SG Automotive
- Also called: Huanghai N2S; Amico Asena (Iran); TAM Vika T1; Pyeonghwa Ssangma 0109 [4x2]/Pyeonghwa Ssangma 0110 [4x4] (North Korea)
- Production: 2015-Present
- Model years: 2015-Present

Body and chassis
- Class: Mid-size pickup truck
- Body style: 2-door Pickup truck
- Layout: Front-engine, rear-wheel drive; Front-engine, four-wheel drive

Powertrain
- Engine: 2.4 L I4 Petrol engine; 2.4 L turbo I4 turbo Petrol engine; 2.5 L turbo I4 turbo Diesel engine; 2.8 L turbo I4 turbo Diesel engine
- Transmission: 5-speed Manual; 6-speed Manual; 5-speed Automatic

Dimensions
- Wheelbase: 134 in (3,405 mm)
- Length: 219 in (5,560 mm)
- Width: 72 in (1,840 mm)
- Height: 73–74 in (1,850–1,890 mm)
- Curb weight: 1710-1810kg

The Huanghai N2 is a mid-size pickup truck produced and sold by SG Automotive (曙光汽车) under the Huanghai Auto (黄海) marque.

== Overview ==
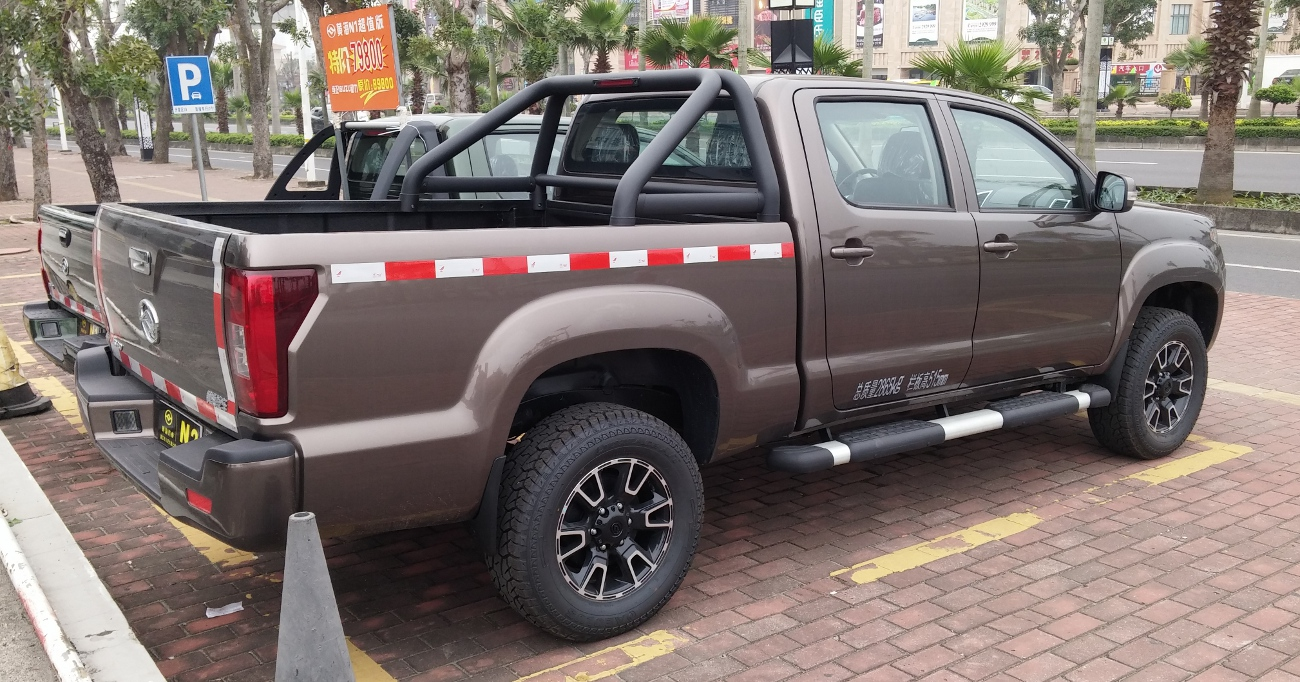
Huanghai N2 rear

The Huanghai N2 pickup truck debuted on the Chinese car market in 2015.

The Huanghai N2 is available with four engines including a 2.4 liter four-cylinder petrol engine, a 2.4 liter four-cylinder turbo petrol engine, a 2.5 liter turbocharged four-cylinder diesel engine, and a 2.8 liter turbocharged four-cylinder diesel engine. Transmission options include a 5-speed manual gearbox, a 6-speed manual gearbox, and a 5-speed automatic gearbox. Prices of the Huanghai N2 ranges from 92,800 yuan to 187,800 yuan.

Some models of Huanghai N2S have front grille design similar to Lexus LM X-shaped spindle mesh, but in matte british khaki (instead of glossy black).
