= Volkswagen Tarok =

Concept compact pickup truck

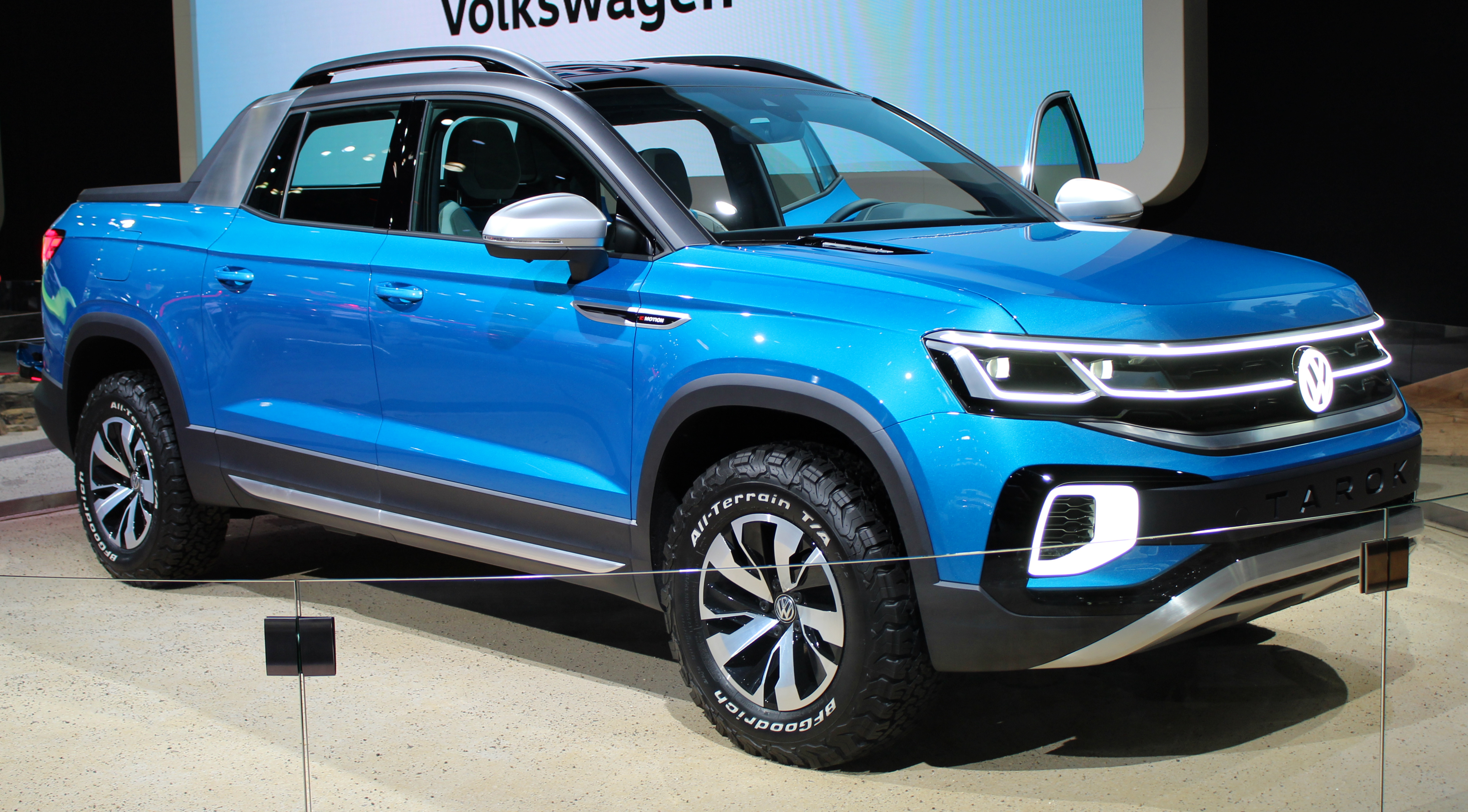

Overview
- Manufacturer: Volkswagen

Body and chassis
- Class: Pickup truck
- Body style: 4-door double cab
- Layout: four-wheel-drive
- Related: Volkswagen Taos

Powertrain
- Engine: 1.4 L I4 (petrol); 2.0 L I4 (diesel)
- Transmission: 6-speed automatic 6-speed manual

Dimensions
- Length: 5,000 mm (196.9 in)

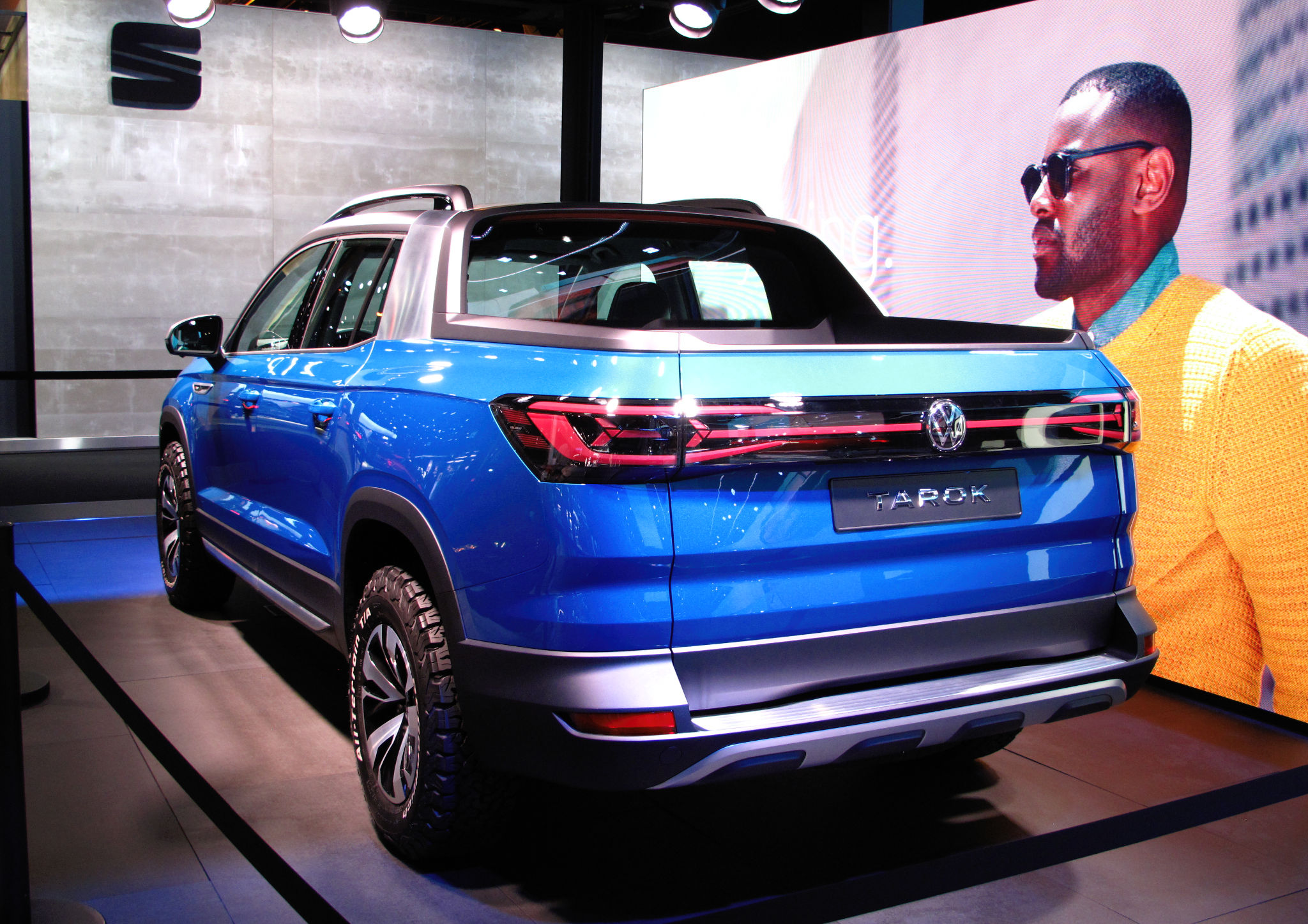
Rear view

The Volkswagen Tarok is a concept compact pickup truck created by the German car manufacturer Volkswagen for Brazil.

== Introduction ==
The Volkswagen Tarok premiered as a concept car at the São Paulo International Motor Show in Brazil on 6 November 2018.

The Tarok concept car was then introduced to the North American market at the 2019 New York International Auto Show.

Due to the 2020 financial crisis and the COVID-19 pandemic, the Tarok has yet to begin production in Brazil or any other market. The vehicle has not been officially cancelled, however.

== Features ==
The dashboard is equipped with 100% digital virtual cockpit, and the dashboard receives a central touchscreen.

=== Engines ===
The Tarok receives two engines of 150hp, a four-cylinder diesel 2.0 TDi and a four-cylinder 1.4 TSI, running with pure ethanol (E100) or a gasoline ethanol mixture (E22).
