= URI Purposely Built Vehicles =

South African automotive manufacturer

URI Purposely Built Vehicles PTY LTD
- Industry: Automotive
- Founded: 1995
- Headquarters: South Africa

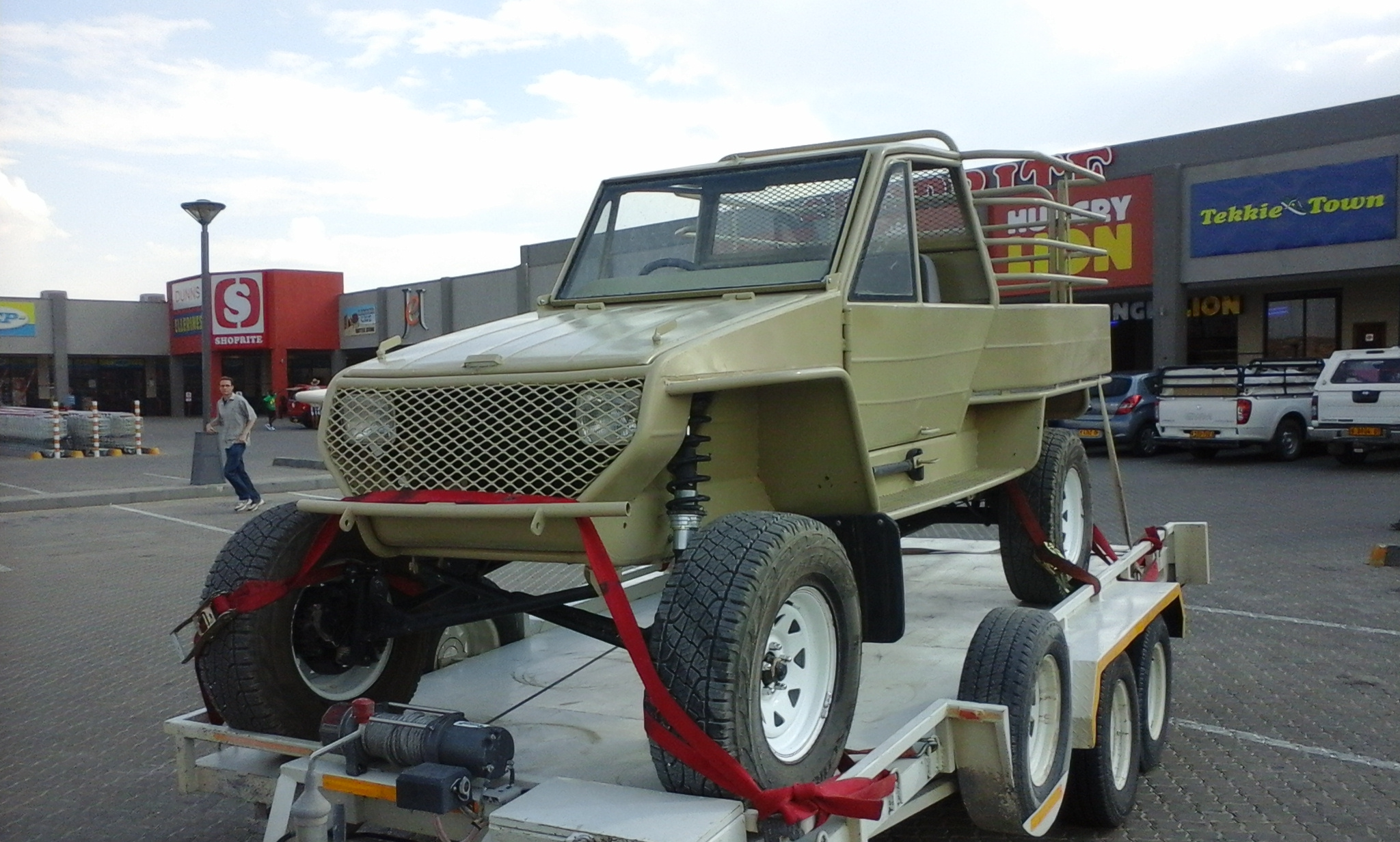
Uri Desert Runner pickup truck

URI Purposely Built Vehicles, officially URI Purposely Built Vehicles PTY LTD, is a South African automotive company who manufactures the Uri off-road vehicle. The company makes two models - URI Desert Runner and URI Mining Vehicle. The first is a simple, reliable and passable jeep in civil, military and police modifications (the army and the police make the company almost the entire turnover).

== History ==
Originally the Uri was designed and built by Ewert Smith, a local Angora goat farmer based in Windhoek, Namibia designed the Uri all-terrain truck in 1995. Smith named the vehicle Uri, a Khoisan Nama word for "jump", and small scale production began in Witvlei, Namibia in 2001. Tested in the Kalahari Desert, the African agro-, police, military and mining industries (De Beers/Anglo American Diamond Mines) ordered many of these trucks.

The original manufacturing company was called Uri - Automobiles, production was then taken over by Uri International Vehicle & Equipment Marketing (Pty.) Ltd. (UVM) located in Waltloo, a north east suburb of Pretoria, South Africa. Since 2008, UVM was as a subsidiary of the South African defense contractor Ivema (Pty.) Ltd. As of 2015, the vehicle is produced by Uri Purposely Built Vehicle (PTY) LTD of Rustenburg, also in South Africa whose cofounders, Andre Squire and Raymond Squire, purchased over all intellectual property in 2015.

The vehicle was originally used in rally, but the designer found out that there could be a market in agriculture, police, military, and the mining industry.

== Variants ==
The Uri is broadly divided into two broad ranges Road and Mining in both 4×4 and 4×2 versions.

=== Uri Desert Runner ===
Specifications

The vehicle is built of mechanical components from Toyota.

- Motor options are Toyota 2 liter or 3 liter five-cylinder turbodiesel or 2.2 or 2.4 liter four-cylinder petrol engine.
- Gearbox is five-step manual.
- Length: 4450 mm
- Width: 1680 mm
- Height: 1855 mm
- Weight: 1425 kg

== URI Mining Vehicle ==
The URI Mining Vehicle is designed to operate in underground mines. The Uri Mining Vehicle is available in two different low-profile cab heights, a 1.4 meter high cab and URI 1.8 meter high cab.
