= Huanghai N3 =

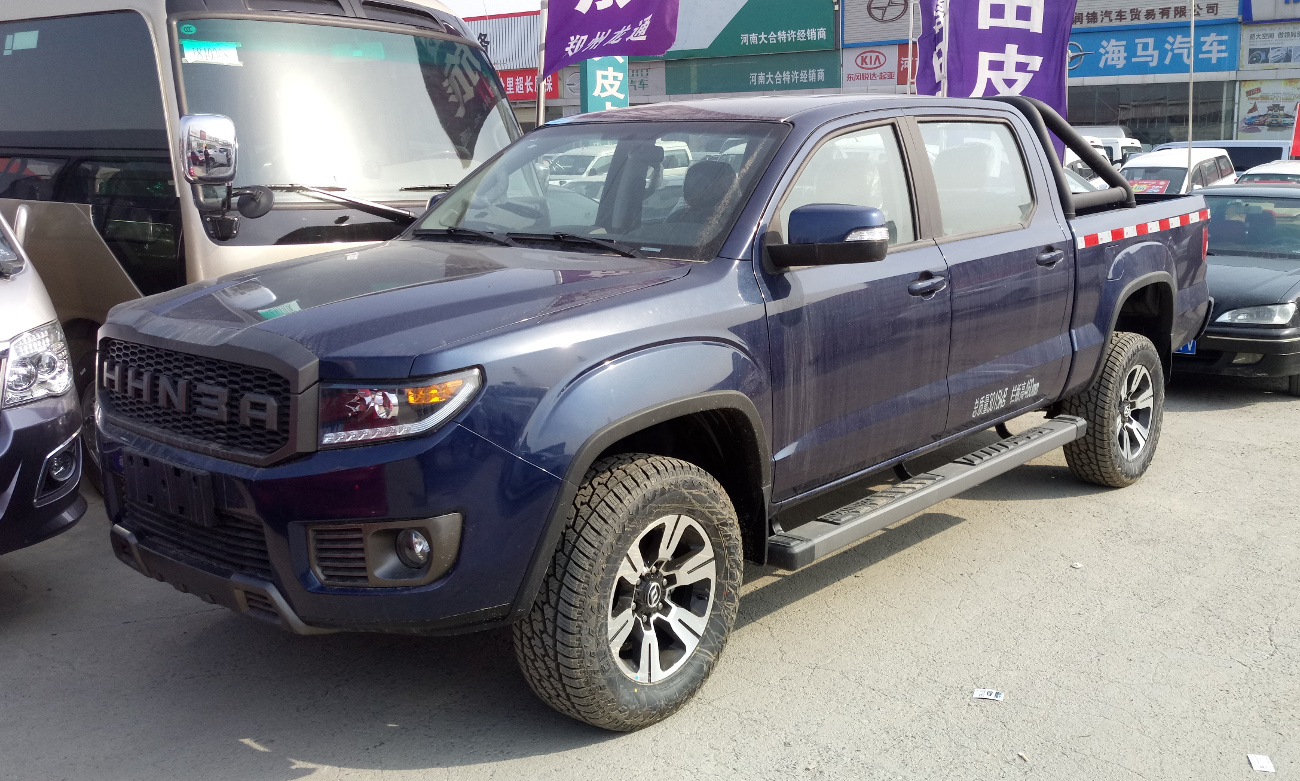
- Huanghai N3A front

Overview
- Manufacturer: SG Automotive
- Also called: Huanghai N3A
- Production: 2017–2020
- Model years: 2017–2018

Body and chassis
- Class: Mid-size pickup truck
- Body style: 2-door Pickup truck
- Layout: Front-engine, rear-wheel drive; Front-engine, four-wheel drive

Powertrain
- Engine: 2.4 L I4 Petrol engine; 2.4 L 4K22D4T turbo I4 turbo Petrol engine; 2.5 L JE4D25Q6A turbo I4 turbo Diesel engine; 2.8 L 1GD-FTV turbo I4 turbo Diesel engine
- Transmission: 6-speed Manual; 6-speed Automatic

Dimensions
- Wheelbase: 134 in (3,405 mm)
- Length: 220 in (5,595 mm)
- Width: 77 in (1,950 mm)
- Height: 73 in (1,865 mm)

The Huanghai N3 is a mid-size pickup truck produced and sold by SG Automotive (曙光汽车) under the Huanghai Auto (黄海) marque.

== Overview ==
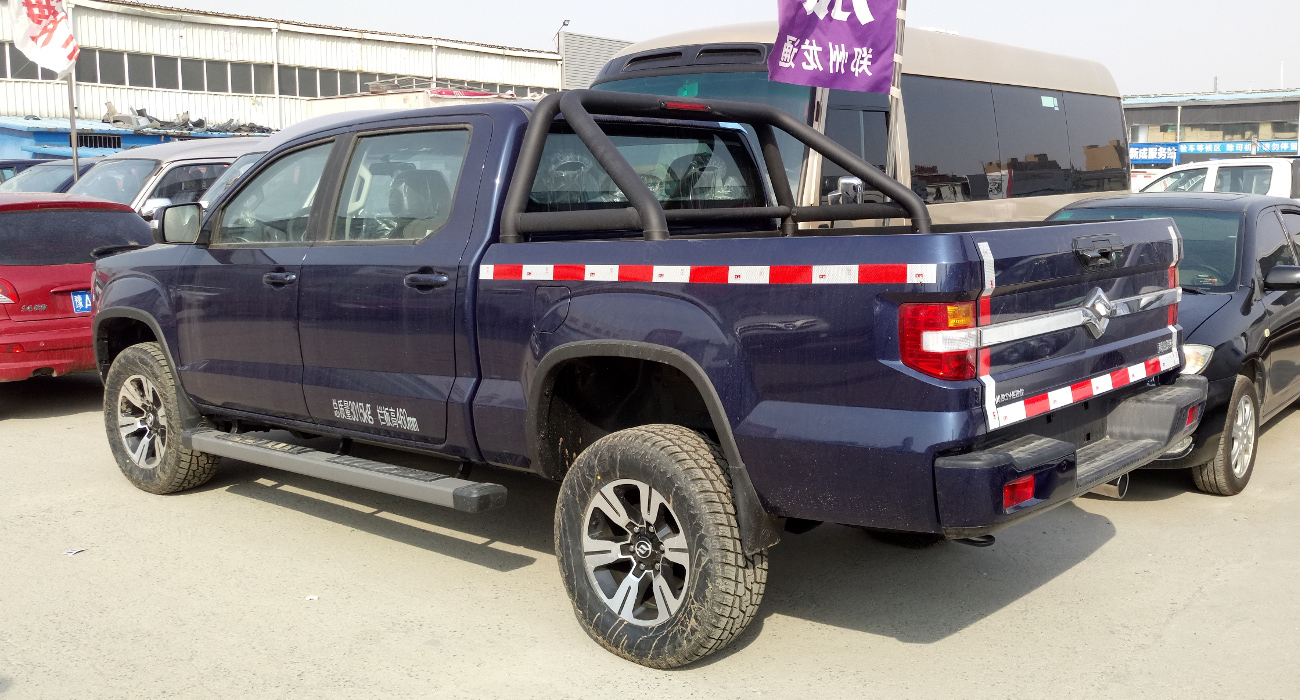
Huanghai N3A rear

The Huanghai N3 pickup truck debuted in China during the 2017 Shanghai Auto Show, and was available in the Chinese car market in July 2017. The first model to debut is the Huanghai N3A. The A is for the base model, a sportier S model was revealed later.

The Huanghai N3 is available with four engine options, including a 2.4-liter four-cylinder petrol engine that produces 218 hp (163 kW) and 320 N⋅m (236 lb⋅ft) of torque, a 2.4-liter four-cylinder turbo petrol engine, and a 2.5-liter turbocharged four-cylinder diesel engine that generates 143 hp (107 kW) and 340 N⋅m (251 lb⋅ft) of torque. Transmission options include a 6-speed manual gearbox and a 6-speed automatic gearbox. Prices of the Huanghai N3 range from 111,800 yuan to 160,800 yuan.
