= Huanghai N1 =

Chinese pickup truck

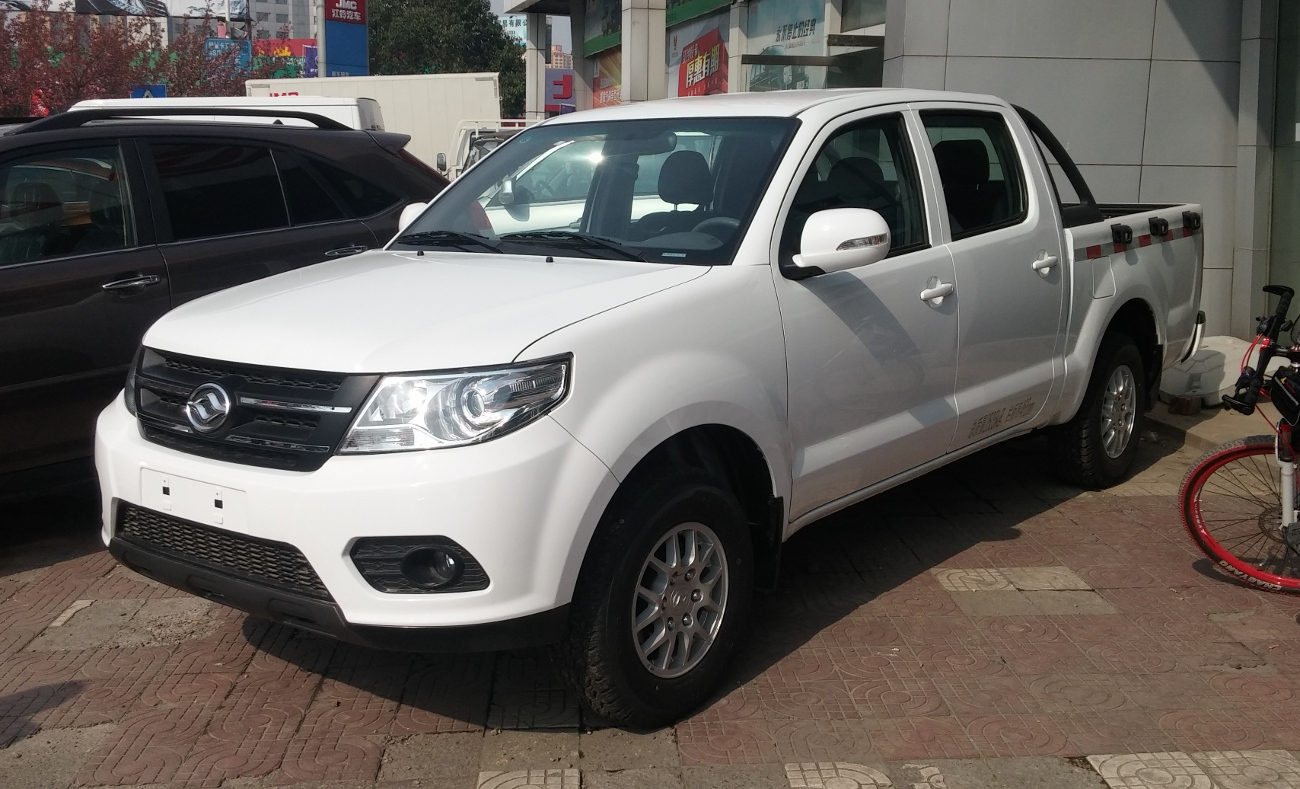
- Huanghai N1

Overview
- Manufacturer: SG Automotive
- Also called: Huanghai N1S; Huanghai Daniu
- Production: 2014-Present
- Model years: 2014-Present

Body and chassis
- Class: Mid-size pickup truck
- Body style: 2-door Pickup truck
- Layout: Front-engine, rear-wheel drive; Front-engine, four-wheel drive

Powertrain
- Engine: 2.4 L I4 Petrol engine; 2.5 L turbo I4 turbo Diesel engine
- Transmission: 5-speed Manual

Dimensions
- Wheelbase: 107 in (2,730 mm)
- Length: 211–219 in (5,365–5,570 mm)
- Width: 70–70 in (1,770–1,790 mm)
- Height: 68–72 in (1,715–1,820 mm)
- Curb weight: 1710-1810kg

The Huanghai N1 is a mid-size pickup truck produced and sold by SG Automotive (曙光汽车) under the Huanghai Auto (黄海) marque.

== Overview ==
The Huanghai N1 pickup truck debuted during the 2014 Beijing Auto Show, and was launched on the Chinese car market in May 2014.

The Huanghai N1 is available with two engines: a Mitsubishi-derived 2.4-liter four-cylinder petrol engine producing 140 hp (104 kW) and 200 N⋅m (148 lb⋅ft) of torque, and a 2.5-liter turbocharged four-cylinder diesel engine producing 100 hp (75 kW) and 220 N⋅m (162 lb⋅ft) of torque, both paired with a 5-speed manual gearbox.

== Huanghai N1S ==
A sportier version called the Huanghai N1S was also available featuring a restyled front bumper and redesigned front grilles.

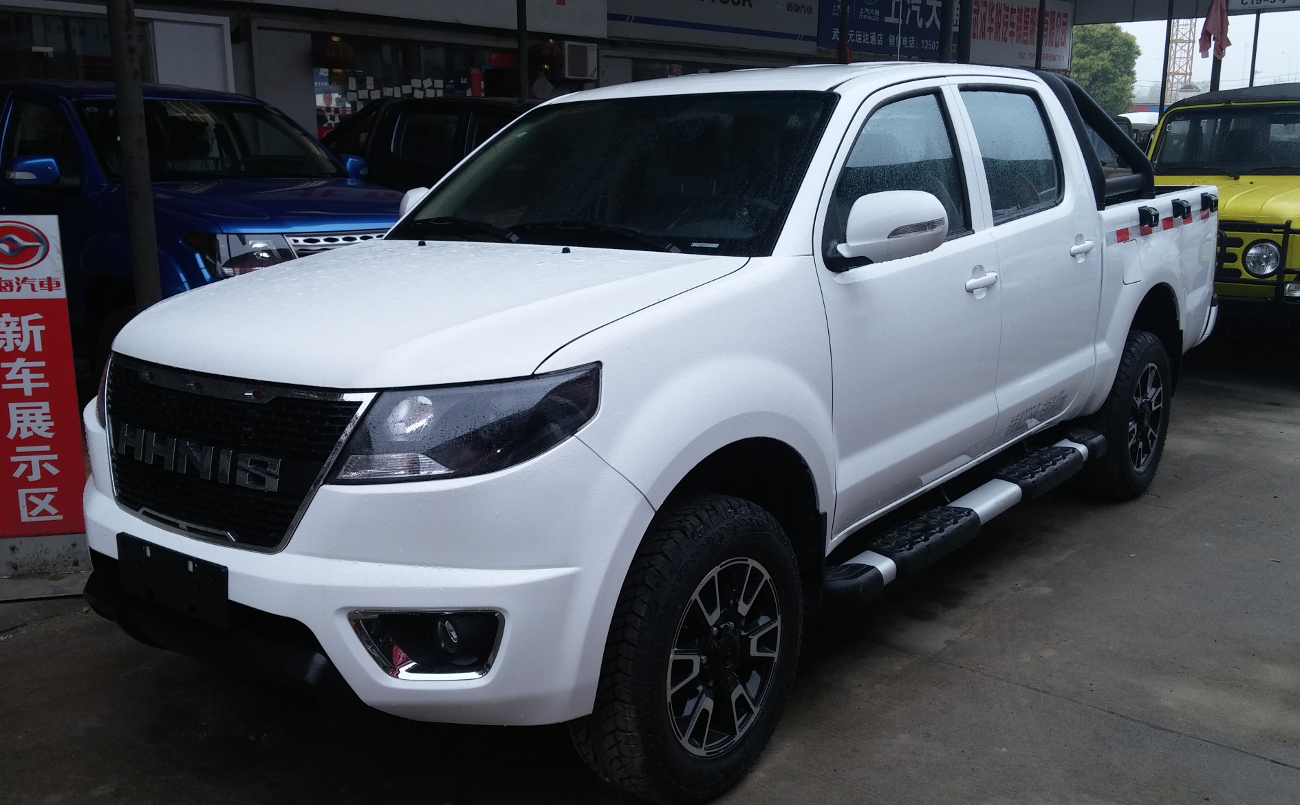
Huanghai N1S front

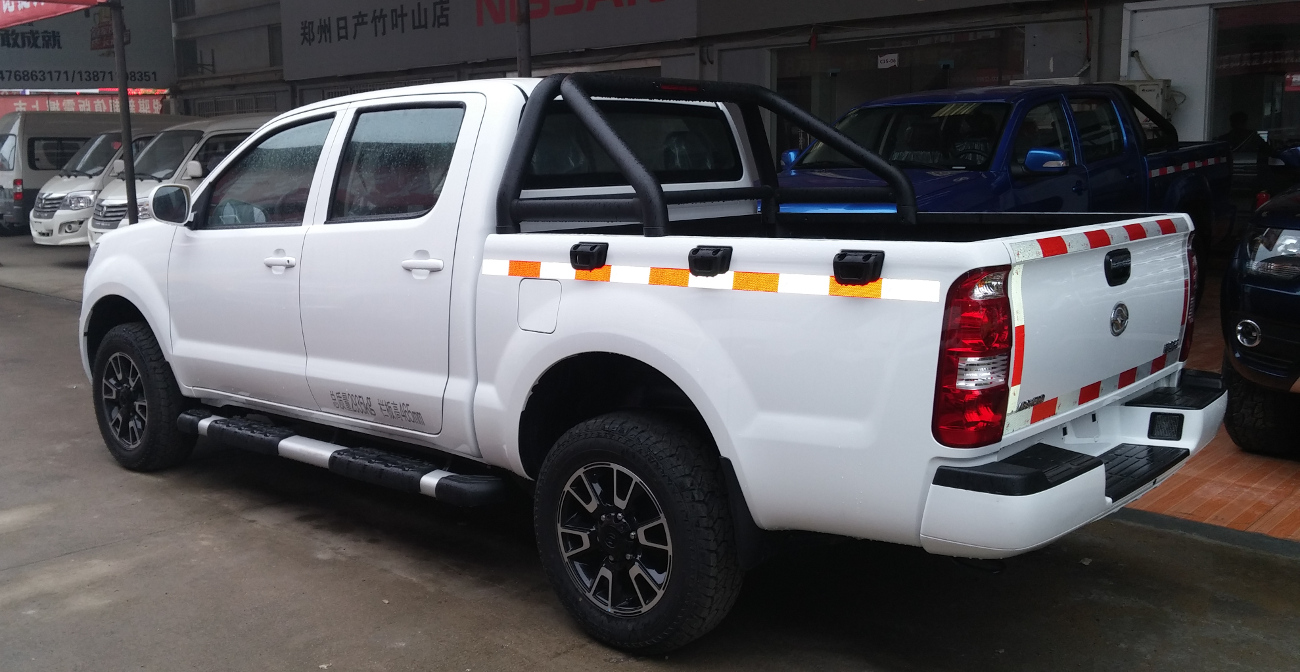
Huanghai N1S rear

== Huanghai Daniu ==
The Huanghai Daniu (大牛, Big Buffalo) is essentially a variant of the N1 featuring a restyled front and rear end. Dimensions are 5570mm long, 1840mm wide and 1805mm tall. The Daniu is available as 2-wheel-drive and 4-wheel-drive models with a 2.4 liter turbo gasoline engine developing 160 hp (119 kW) and 320 N⋅m (236 lb⋅ft) or a 2.5 liter turbo diesel engine with 110 hp (82 kW) and 360 N⋅m (266 lb⋅ft) available.
