= Dadi Auto =

Chinese truck manufacturer (1988–2012)

Dadi Automobile Group Co., Ltd.
- Native name: 大迪汽车集团有限公司
- Company type: Private company
- Industry: Automotive
- Founded: 1988
- Defunct: October 16, 2012
- Successor: Hengtian (CHTC) Dadi Automobile
- Headquarters: Baoding, Hebei, China
- Products: Commercial vehicles
- Website: www.bddqc.com.cn/web1/web/index.asp

Dadi Auto (officially Dadi Automobile Group Co., Ltd.) was a pickup truck and heavy-duty truck manufacturing company headquartered in Baoding, China. Formerly a military automobile maker, Baoding Dadi assembled their first civil pickup in 1988. Their product line-up mirrored that of Great Wall Motor and Zhongxing. The company claimed a production capacity of 50,000 units per year, but this figure may conflate engines and whole vehicles. The company later stopped manufacturing passenger cars and focused on the commercial vehicle market. In November 2011, Chinese conglomerate CHTC acquired Dadi and reincorporated it as Hengtian (CHTC) Dadi Automobile Co., Ltd. on October 16, 2012.

== Models ==
- Dadi Bliss (2005–2012; a Pickup based on the Isuzu Rodeo)
- Dadi City Leading (2005–2012; a SUV based on Toyota Land Cruiser HDJ100)
- Dadi City Steed (2006–2012; a SUV based on second generation Toyota Land Cruiser Prado )
- Dadi Courtly (2006–2012; a Pickup based on Isuzu Rodeo)
- Dadi Shuttle (2007–2012; SUV based on penultimate generation Toyota Land Cruiser Prado)
- Dadi Smoothing (2006–2012; Pickup based on Isuzu Rodeo)
- Dadi Unisonous (2007–2012; Pickup based on Isuzu D-MAX)
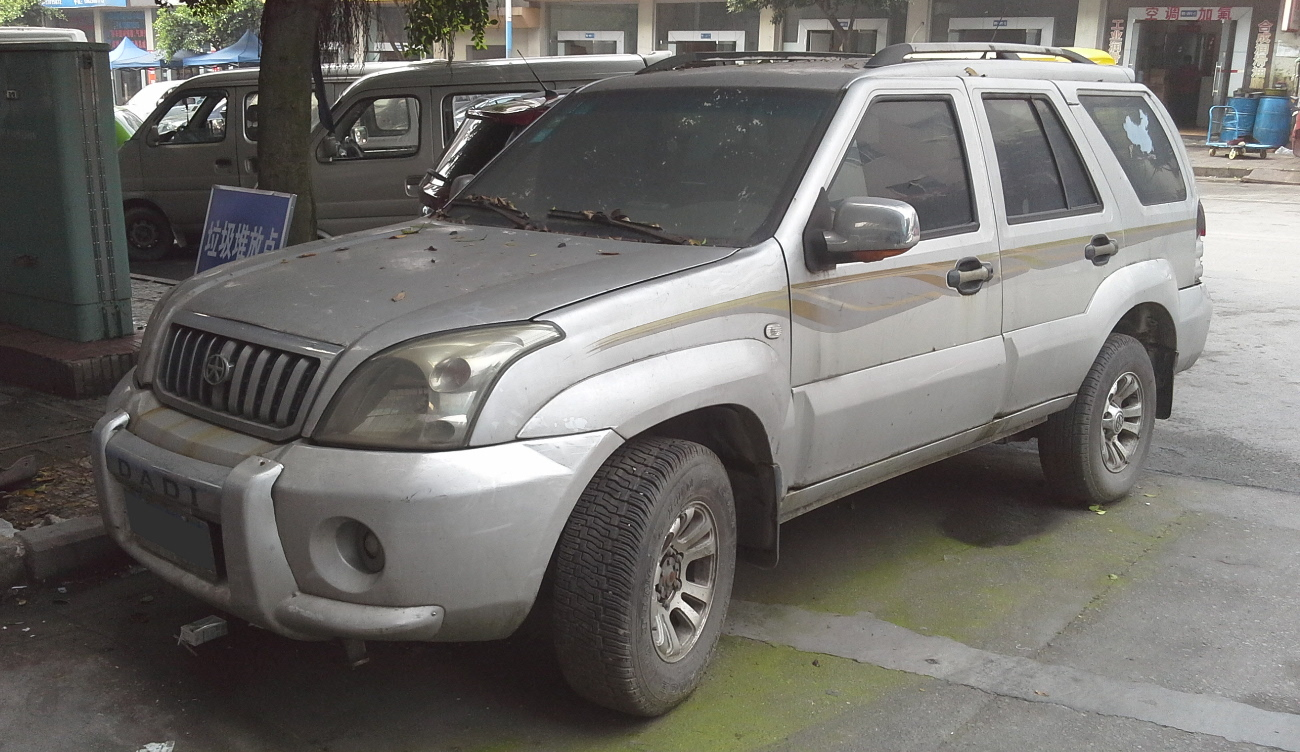
Dadi Auto Jingchi

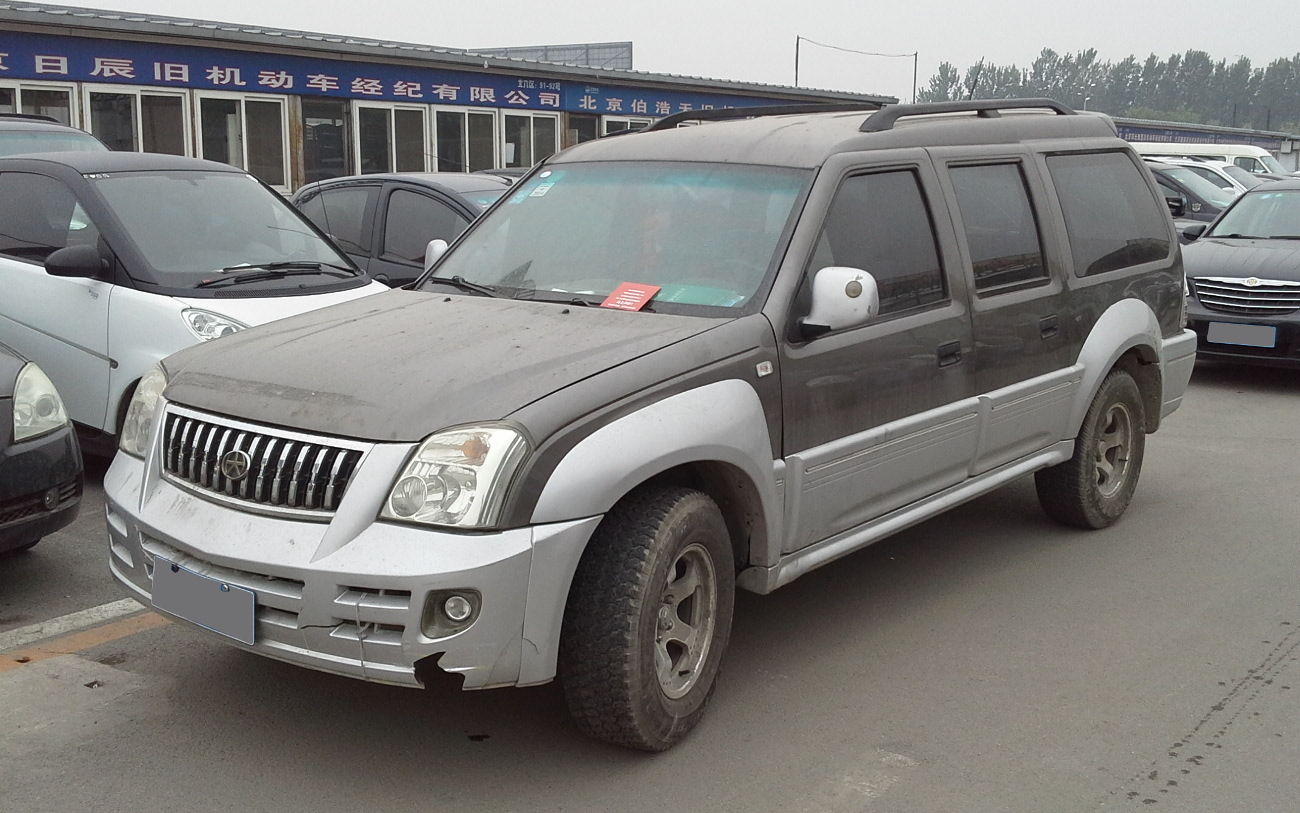
Dadi Auto Dushijunma

== Dadi Compartment Vehicles ==
Dadi Compartment Vehicles was a separate division which produces 50,000 units per year. The DCV was engaged in the production of special vehicles. These are based on the older Toyota Land Cruiser 100 or other regular Dadi vehicles.

Current Models of DCV are:

- DCV BDD5023XXYC
- DCV BDD5023XXYE

== See also ==
- Automotive industry in China
