= Bahman Group =

Iranian vehicle manufacturer founded in 1952

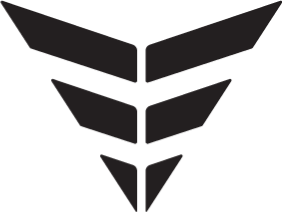
- Type: Public
- Industry: Holding Company
- Founded: 1952
- Headquarters: Tehran, Iran
- Key people: Buick Alimoradloo (CEO)
- Products: Automobiles; Buses; Trucks; Motorcycles; Engines
- Website: www.bahman.ir

Bahman Group (Persian: گروه بهمن, Goruh-e Bahman) is an Iranian car manufacturer founded on February 5, 1953, by Iranian industrialist Amanollah Sarbaz.

Bahman Group began its operations on February 5, 1953, with the registration of the company "Iran Khalij Co." and an initial capital of 600,000 Rials. For its first seven years, the company was active in the maritime transport sector.

In 1959, the company produced its first product—a three-wheeled Mazda pickup truck—and subsequently changed its name to "Mazda Automobile Manufactory." During the 1970s, introduced the compact Mazda 1000 pickup to the market. By 1984, the Mazda B1600 pickup had entered production. That same year, the company was renamed "Iran Vanet," continuing to offer both the Mazda 1000 and the Mazda B1600 in the Iranian market.

In 1999, Iran Vanet Company joined the "Bahman Group" holding company—which operates in the sectors of automotive and motorcycle manufacturing, commerce, and investment—and was renamed "Bahman Motors." The brand gained further recognition with the launch of the "Bahman 110" motorcycle. Concurrently, the company prioritized the production of Mazda passenger cars, leading to the manufacturing of the eighth-generation Mazda Familia—marketed as the Mazda 323F—that same year. In 2003, Bahman Group began producing the Mazda B2000 pickup in both single-cab and double-cab configurations; it also replaced the 323F with the ninth-generation Mazda Familia, known as the Mazda 323 GLX. Subsequently, the facelifted version emblemd as Mazda 323FL was introduced to the market by Bahman Group; it served as a primary competitor to the Citroën Xantia, which was being manufactured by Saipa.

To date, the only product from Bahman Group released under the "Bahman" brand name has been the Bahman 110 motorcycle, which was the Iranian version of the Malaysian-made Modenas Kriss series.

In 2004, with the objective of manufacturing light, medium, and heavy-duty trucks as well as minibuses, the company established Bahman Diesel (B.D.C.) and began producing commercial vehicles under the Japanese Isuzu brand. Within a short period, it captured a dominant share of the market for such commercial vehicles.

In 2016, Bahman Group entered into partnerships with foreign automakers such as Mazda, Isuzu, FAW, ZX Auto, and Great Wall Motor. They became shareholders of the Siba Motor Company after its creation in 2007. In 2013 Bahman Group formed a relationship with FAW Group, China's biggest automaker.

‌The Bahman Group has been listed annually for many years in the Iran 100 top companies based on assessments by the Industrial Management Institute (IMI).

Recently, Bahman Group planned further exports of motor vehicles to Afghanistan, Cambodia, Laos, Myanmar, Syria, Yemen, Cuba, El Salvador, Honduras, Nicaragua, Venezuela, post-Soviet countries, Africa.

== Products ==
=== Current Automobiles ===
- Respect Prime
- Fidelity Elite
- Fidelity Prestige
- Fidelity XB1
- Cheval 6
- Capra 2
- G9
- Cara B2000

=== Former Automobiles ===
- Mazda 323F
- Mazda 323GLX
- Mazda 323FL
- Mazda 2
- Mazda 3
- Mazda 3 New
- Besturn B50
- Besturn B50F
- Besturn B30
- Capra 1
- Cara 1700
- Mazda B2000
- Mazda B1600
- Mazda 1000
- Isuzu D-Max
- Caro
- Haval H2
- Mitsubishi Pajero
- Landmark
- Haval H9

=== Truck ===
- Isuzu NMR
- Isuzu FVZ
- Shiller 6 ton
- Isuzu FVR
- Isuzu NKR
- Isuzu NPR
- Isuzu FVZ
- Tiger-v 6 Ton
- Tiger-v 8 Ton
- J6
- CA 3250

=== Minibus ===
- Sahar
- Maxus
- Shiller

=== Motorcycle ===
- Azma 125
- Azma 150
- Azma 200
- Arshia 125
- Arshia 150
- Arshia 200
- Bahman 110
- Yamaha YB125Super
- Irdoco XY150-10B
- Irdoco XY249-GY2
- Irdoco X2
- Irdoco RATO
- KPT 200PRO
