= Zhongxing Admiral =

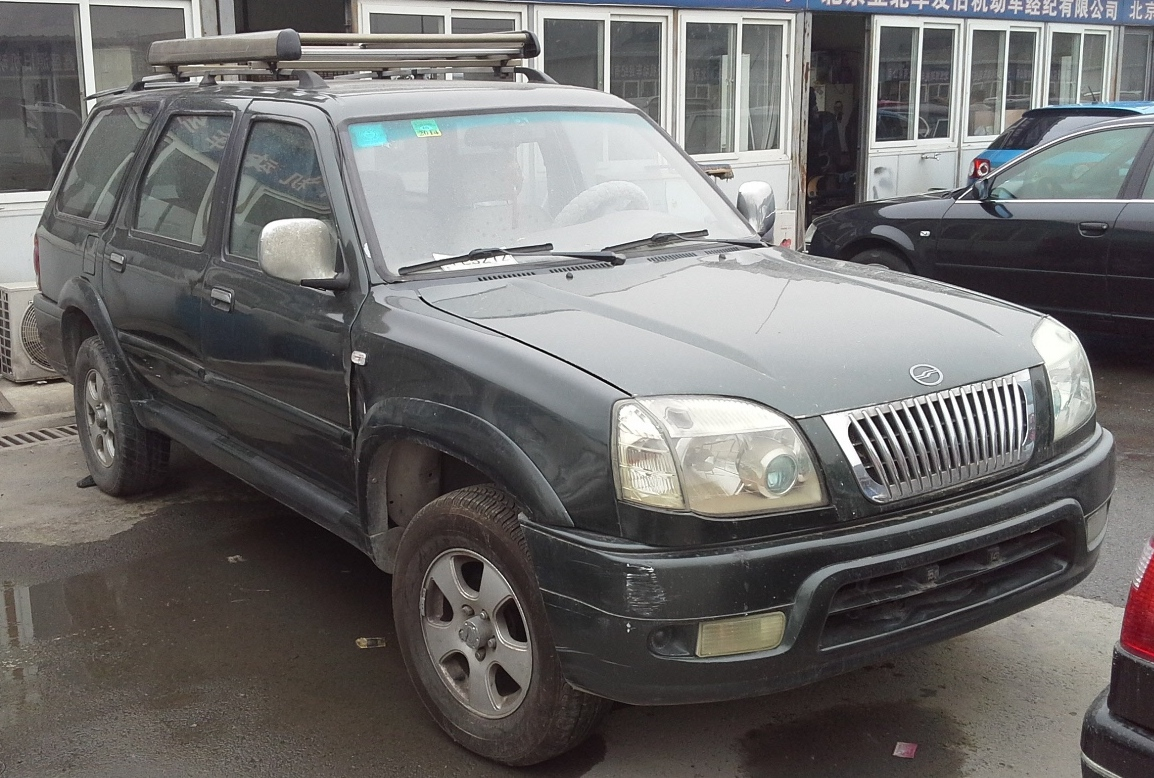

Overview
- Production: 2000–2010
- Model years: 2000–2010
- Assembly: Baoding, Hebei

Body and chassis
- Class: Mid-size SUV
- Body style: 5-door SUV; 4-door pickup
- Related: Toyota Hilux; Zhongxing Grand Tiger

Powertrain
- Engine: Petrol 2.2 L 491Q-ME I4
- Transmission: 5-speed manual

Dimensions
- Wheelbase: 105.3 in (2,675 mm)
- Length: 4,650 mm (183.1 in)
- Width: 1,715 mm (67.5 in)
- Height: 1,680 mm (66.1 in)
- Curb weight: 2,075 lb (941 kg) (approx.)

The Zhongxing Admiral is a mid-size sport utility vehicle and pick-up produced by the Chinese manufacturer ZX Auto and sold throughout the world from 2000 to 2010. The original model was launched in 2000 and sold until 2004. An extensive facelift was introduced in 2005 as the second generation model, and a derived pick-up variant called the Grand Tiger was introduced in 2007.

== Overview ==
The Zhongxing Admiral was built on a platform derived from that of the sixth generation Toyota Hilux. The platform was produced under a license deal with Toyota. The Admiral's engine, also sourced from Toyota, was a 2.2 liter 491Q-ME petrol engine producing 76 kW (102 hp) and 193 N⋅m (142 lb⋅ft). The engine was mated to a five-speed manual transmission. The Admiral had a top speed of 130 km/h (81 mph), and its 0-100 km/h (62 mph) acceleration time was 11 seconds.

The Admiral SUV and pick-up were launched in 2000. At launch, the SUV models had a high-end top trim level featuring a hood scoop, a differently styled front bumper, extended wheel arches, chrome mirror covers, and factory white wall tires. The interior was equipped with electric windows, a CD player, optional faux-leather seats and a rear-seat entertainment system with two DVD screens. Only rear-wheel drive was available.

The vehicle designation of the Zhongxing Admiral begins with BQ6472. BQ was the vehicle code for the Zhongxing brand, and 6742 was the code for the Admiral. The last three digits differ depending on the variant.

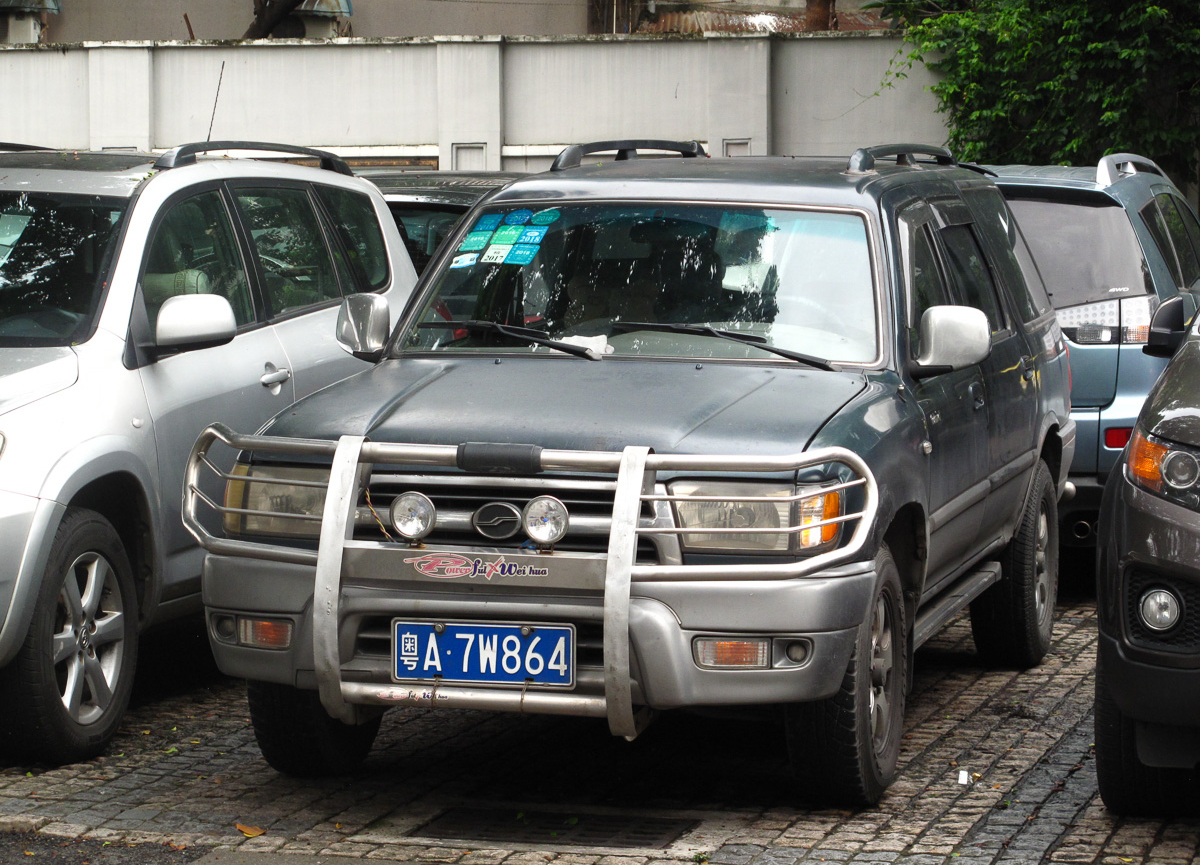
Original Zhongxing Admiral SUV

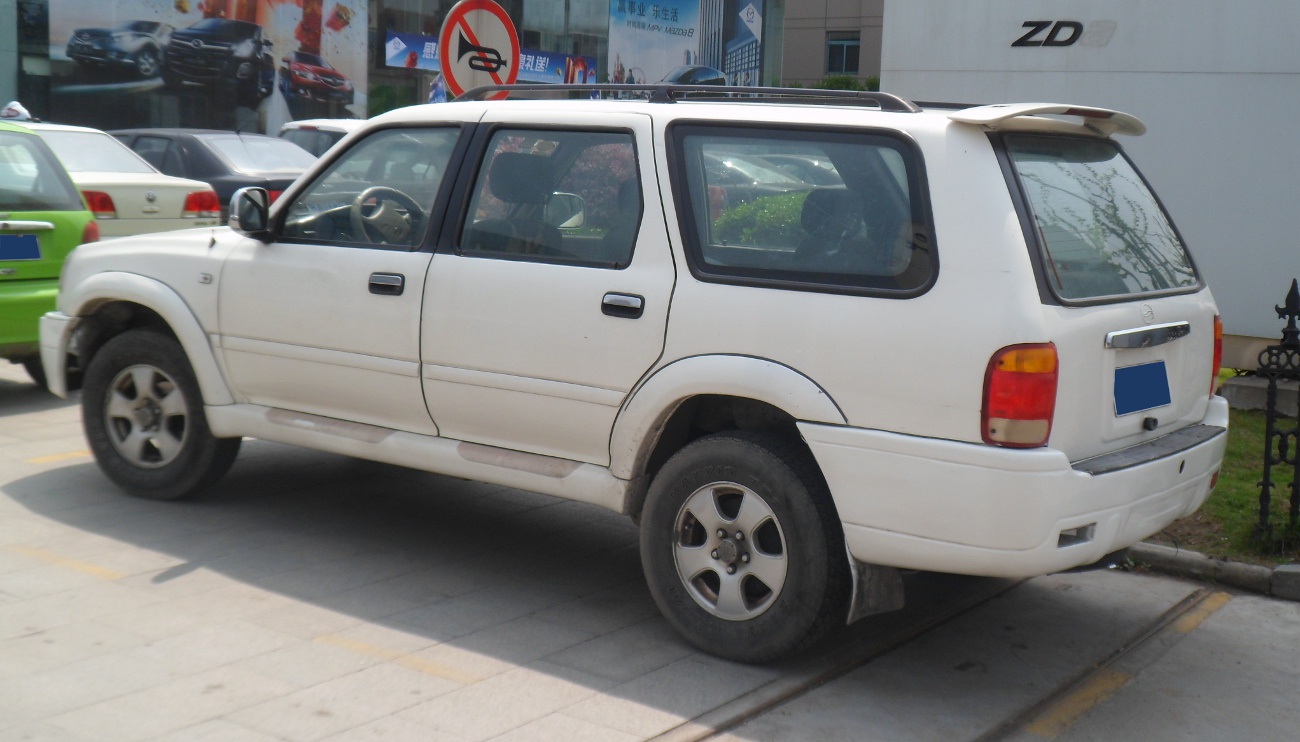
Original Zhongxing Admiral SUV (rear)

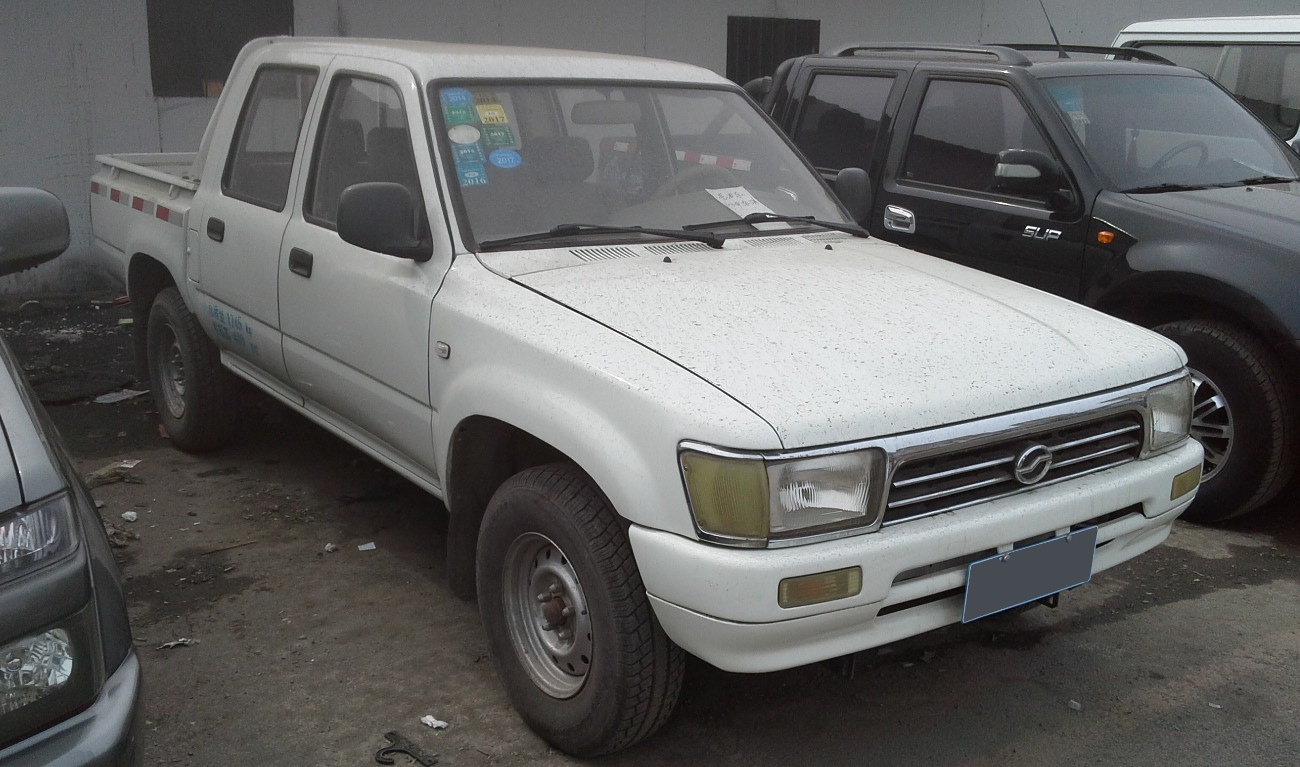
Original Zhongxing Admiral pickup

=== 2005 facelift ===
In 2005, the Admiral received a facelift and was considered by ZX Auto to be the second generation model, which was called the Admiral II. The Admiral II was available in a 4WD version and was sold from 2005 to 2010.

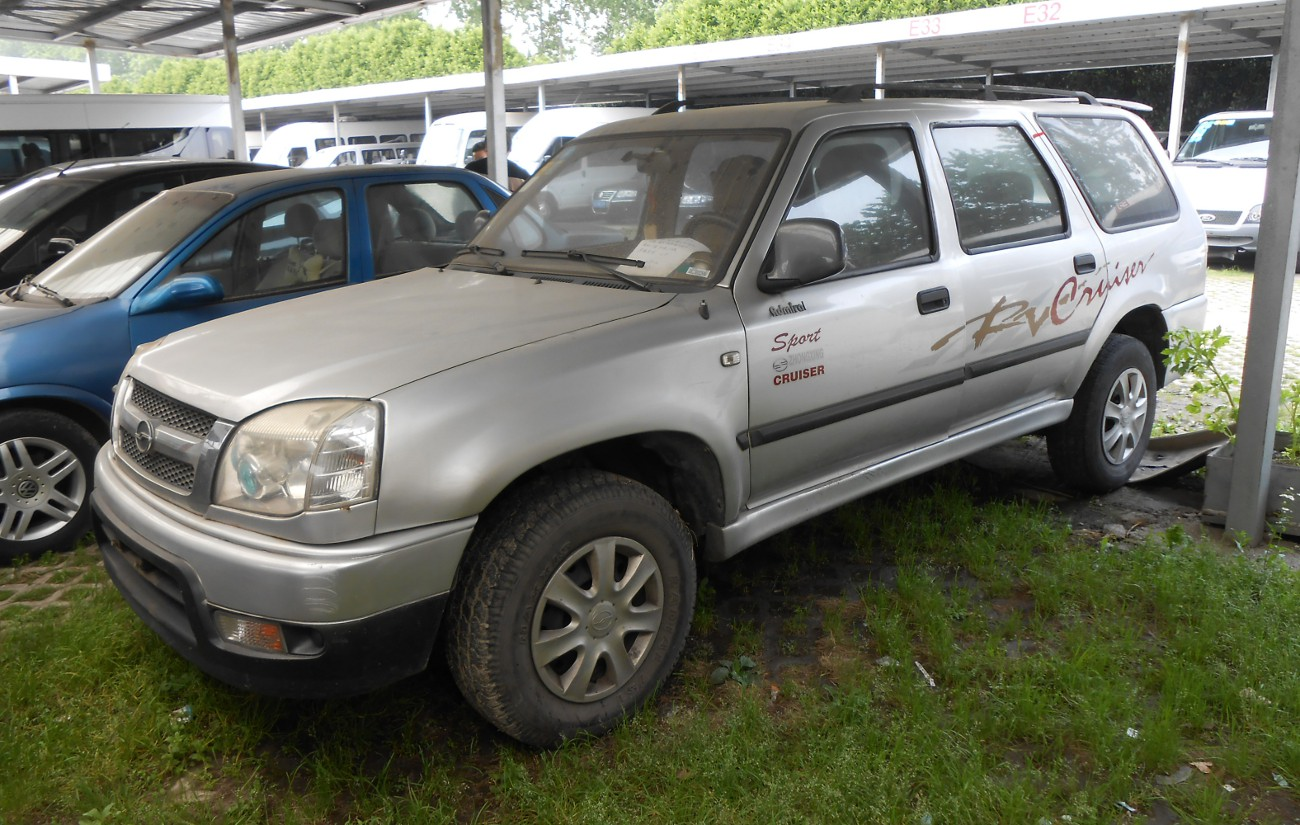
Zhongxing Admiral II SUV

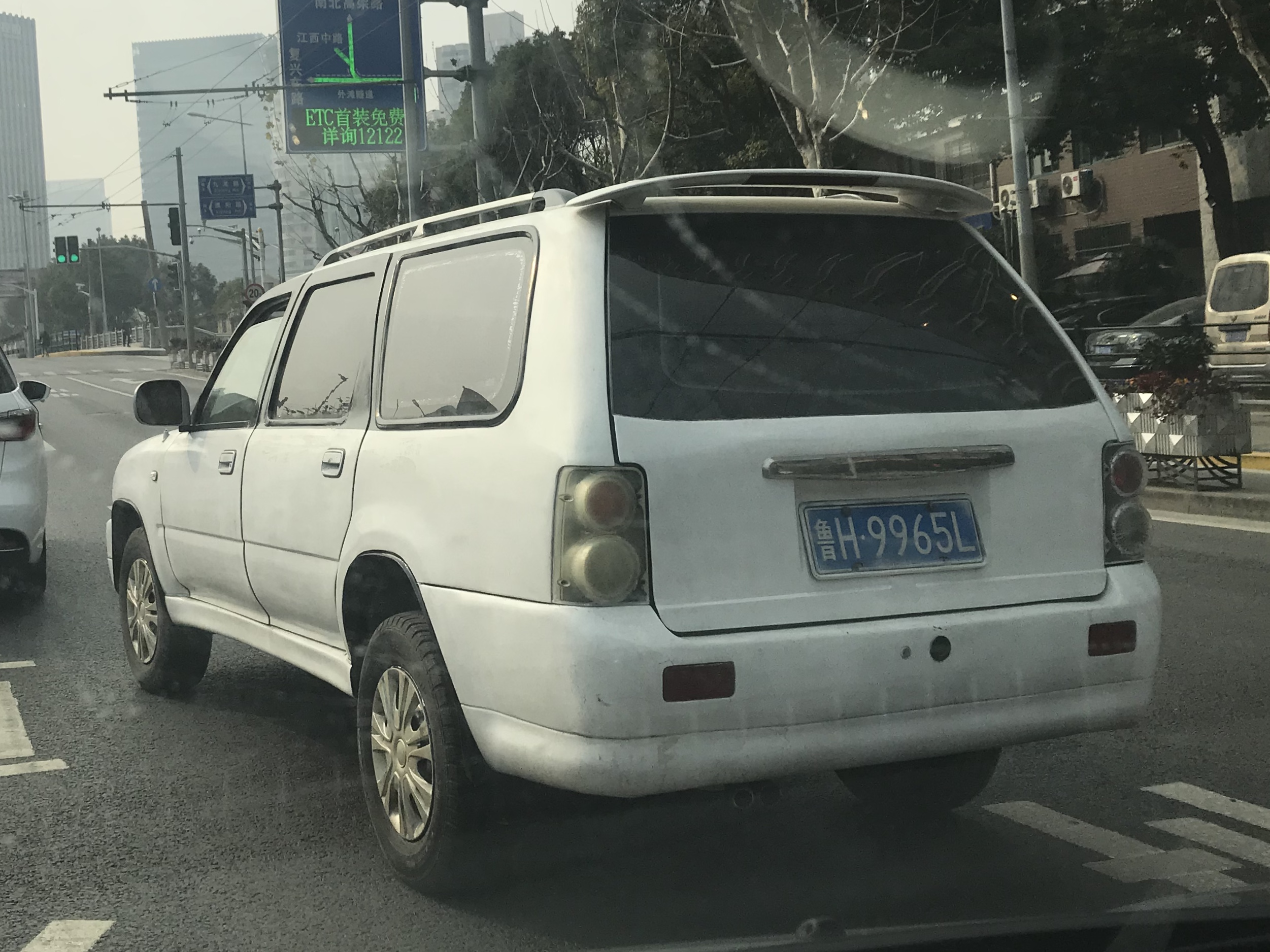
Zhongxing Admiral II SUV (rear)

=== Zhongxing Grand Tiger ===
In 2007, the Admiral pick-up received another facelift and became a standalone model, renamed the Zhongxing Grand Tiger. Only the pick-up variant is still in production.
