= GX3 =

GX3 may refer to:

== Aircraft ==
- Burnelli GX-3, an American twin-engined, mid-wing experimental aircraft

== Automobiles ==
- Geely GX3, a 2017–present Chinese subcompact crossover
- Volkswagen GX3, a 2006 German sports car concept
- Zhongxing GX3, a 2014 Chinese subcompact crossover concept
