= Zhongxing Terralord =

Chinese pickup truck

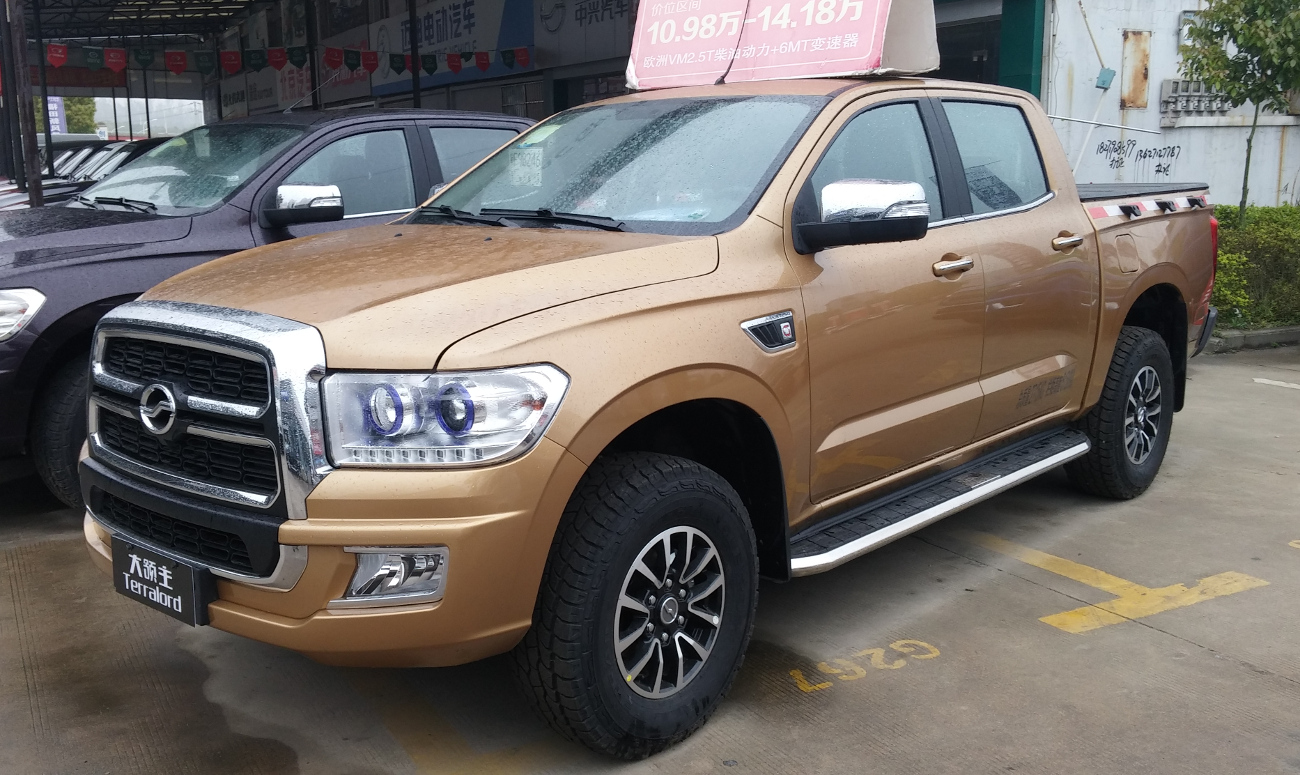

Overview
- Manufacturer: Hebei Zhongxing Automobile
- Also called: BAIC Beijing Terralord (Algeria); Daehan Megatron (Laos); Imperium Terra-E; IVM Granite (Nigeria); Kantanka Omama (Ghana); Zhongxing Weishi 1986 / Weishi G7; Bahman G9 (Iran); Tigard L7 Plus (Iran); Wallys Annibal (Tunisia); Forthing P8; GAC Smilodon; TAM Vika T4; Firebright FP3-Series (Thailand; Electric)
- Production: 2016–present
- Assembly: Baoding, Hebei; Batna, Algeria; Tehran, Iran (Bahman Group); Bangkok, Thailand (Firebright (Thailand))

Body and chassis
- Body style: 4-door Pickup truck
- Layout: ICE; Front-engine, four-wheel-drive; EV; Rear-motor, rear-wheel-drive; Dual-motors, four-wheel-drive

Powertrain
- Engine: 2.4 L Mitsubishi 4K22D4T I4 turbo petrol; 2.5 L Isuzu 4BB1 I4 turbo diesel
- Electric motor: PMSM
- Transmission: 6-speed manual
- Battery: NMC (EV)

Dimensions
- Wheelbase: 3,250 mm (128 in)
- Length: 5,341 mm (210.3 in)
- Width: 1,885 mm (74.2 in)
- Height: 1,815 mm (71.5 in)

The Zhongxing Terralord (Chinese: 中兴领主) is a mid-size pickup truck designed and developed by Hebei Zhongxing Automobile.

== Overview ==
Zhongxing revealed the Terralord during the 2016 Chengdu Auto Show, and launched the Terralord in the Chinese market in October 2016).

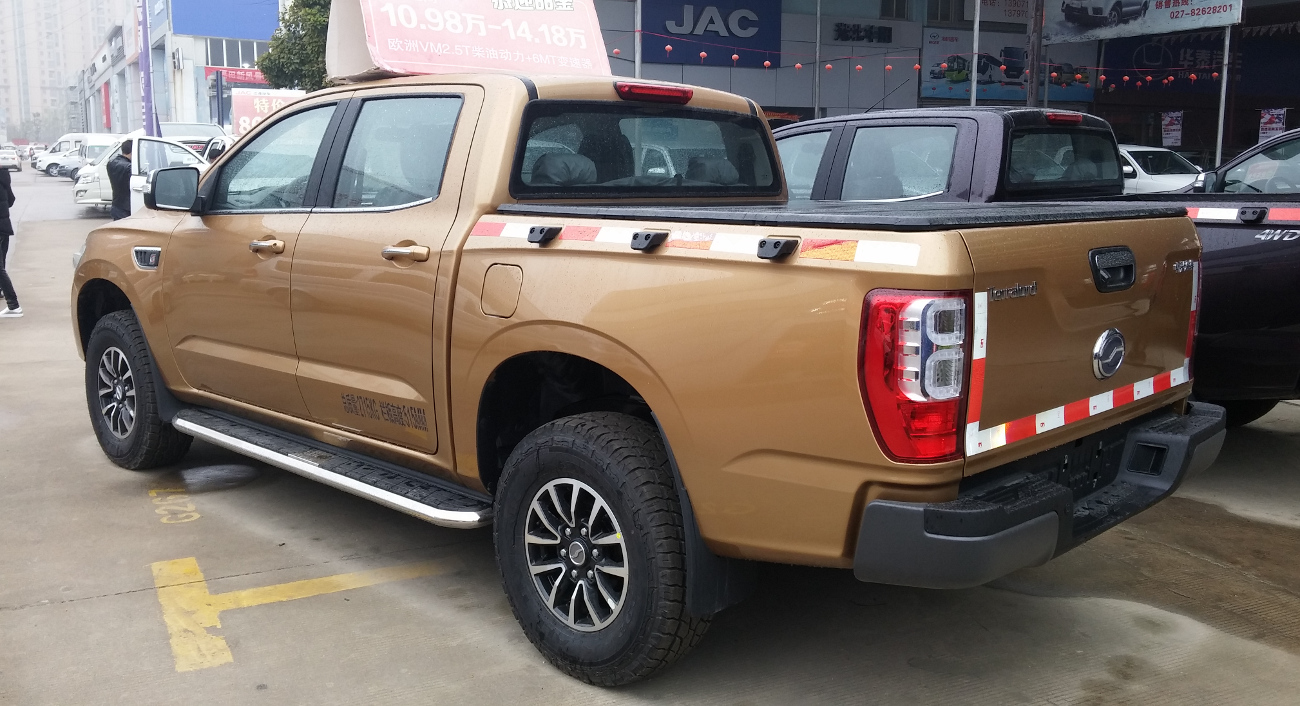
Zhongxing Terralord rear in China

The Terralord features a standard four door crew cab short bed with the length of 1530 mm, a width of 1620 mm, and a height of 515 mm. Power by an Isuzu sourced 2.5 liter turbo diesel engine producing 101 kW (136 hp) and 240 N⋅m (180 lbf⋅ft) of torque. The transmission is a six-speed manual gearbox, sending power to all four wheels.

== Zhongxing Weishi 1986 ==
A facelift variant called the Weishi (威师) G7 Shooting Brake was launched in October 2021 powered by a 2.0-litre turbo diesel engine producing 124 kW (166 hp) and 410 N·m mated to a 6-speed manual transmission. The model was offered in 2 wheel drive and 4 wheel drive versions and available in 12 different trim levels. Despite the Shooting Brake name, the model is identical to the regular post-facelift Terralord and has exact same dimensions with an addition of decals on the side. The same model was revised in March 2022 and renamed to Weishi 1986 with additional trim levels added ending with a 20 trim level lineup.

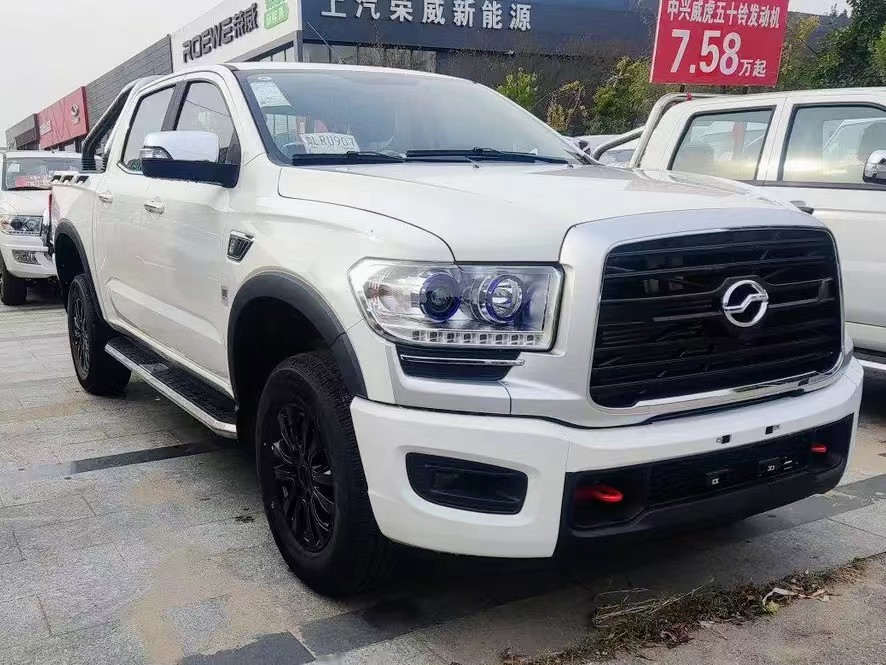
Front view of the Weishi 1986

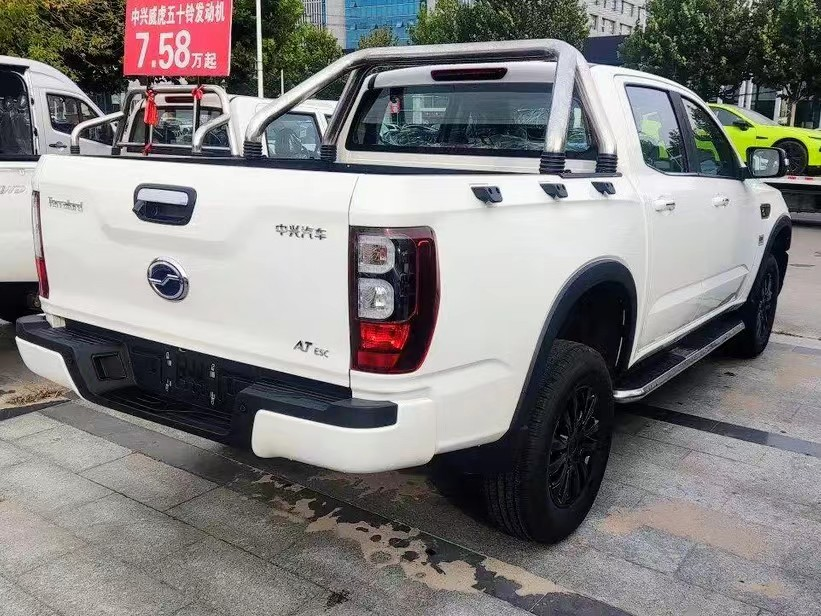
Rear view of the Weishi 1986

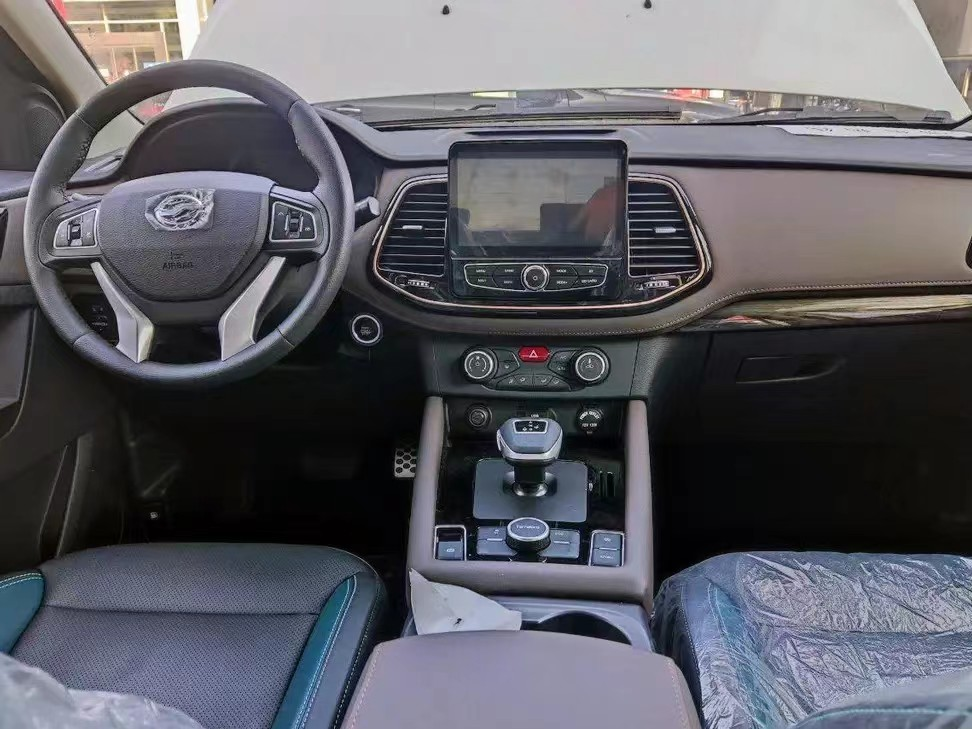
Interior of the Weishi 1986

== Zhongxing Weishi 1949 ==
Concept name ZX Auto G9. First full-size production pickup truck manufactured in China. 5692 mm length, 2045 mm width (excluding mirrors), 1965 mm height. 2.3 L turbo diesel engine built by Renault/Nissan, 163 hp (122 kW) and 380 N⋅m (280 lb⋅ft) peak torque.

== Imperium Terra-E ==
The DSG Global Inc.(DSGT), and subsidiary automobile division Imperium Motor Corp collaborated with Zhejiang Jonway Group Co., Ltd. (Jonway Group) for the North American market and produced an electric version of the Terralord pickup called the Terra-E under the Imperium brand. The Imperium Terra-E has an estimated range of up to 225 miles according to the official website.
