= Zhongxing Landmark =

Zhongxing Landmark (V3)
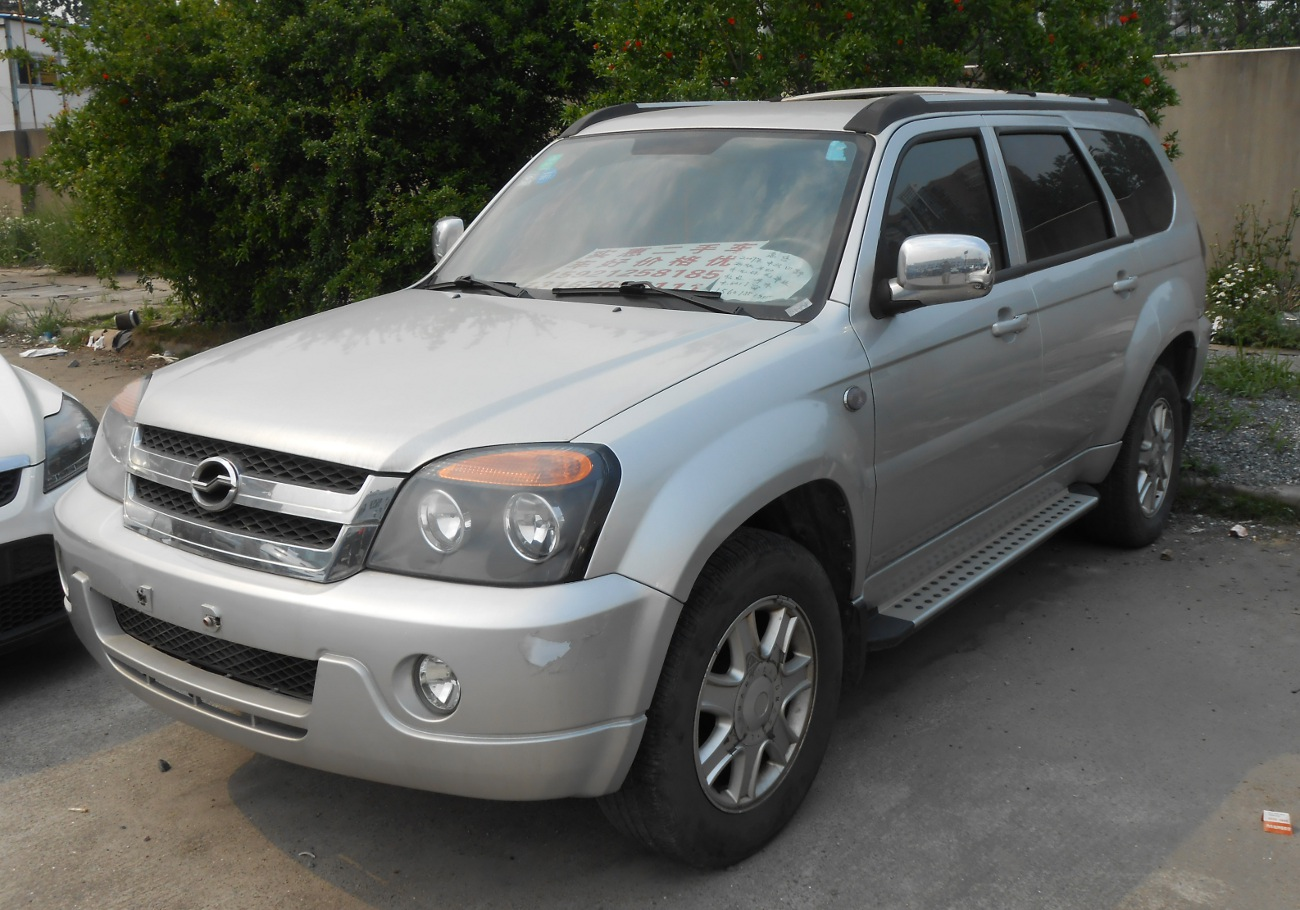

Overview
- Also called: Zhongxing Tiger SUV; Zhongxing Landmark V5; Zhongxing Landmark V7
- Production: 2006–2013
- Assembly: Baoding, Hebei

Body and chassis
- Body style: 5-door SUV
- Layout: Front-engine, two wheel drive Front-engine, four wheel drive
- Related: Zhongxing Tiger/Tiger TUV

Powertrain
- Engine: petrol: 2351 cc Mitsubishi 4G64S4M I4; 2378 cc Mitsubishi 4G69 I4; diesel: 2499 cc VM R425 DOHC I4
- Transmission: 5-speed manual

Dimensions
- Wheelbase: 2,850 mm (112 in)
- Length: 4,717 mm (185.7 in)
- Width: 1,790 mm (70 in)
- Height: 1,780 mm (70 in)–1,820 mm (72 in)

The Zhongxing Landmark (Chinese: 中兴无限) is a mid-size SUV designed and developed by Hebei Zhongxing Automobile.

== Overview ==
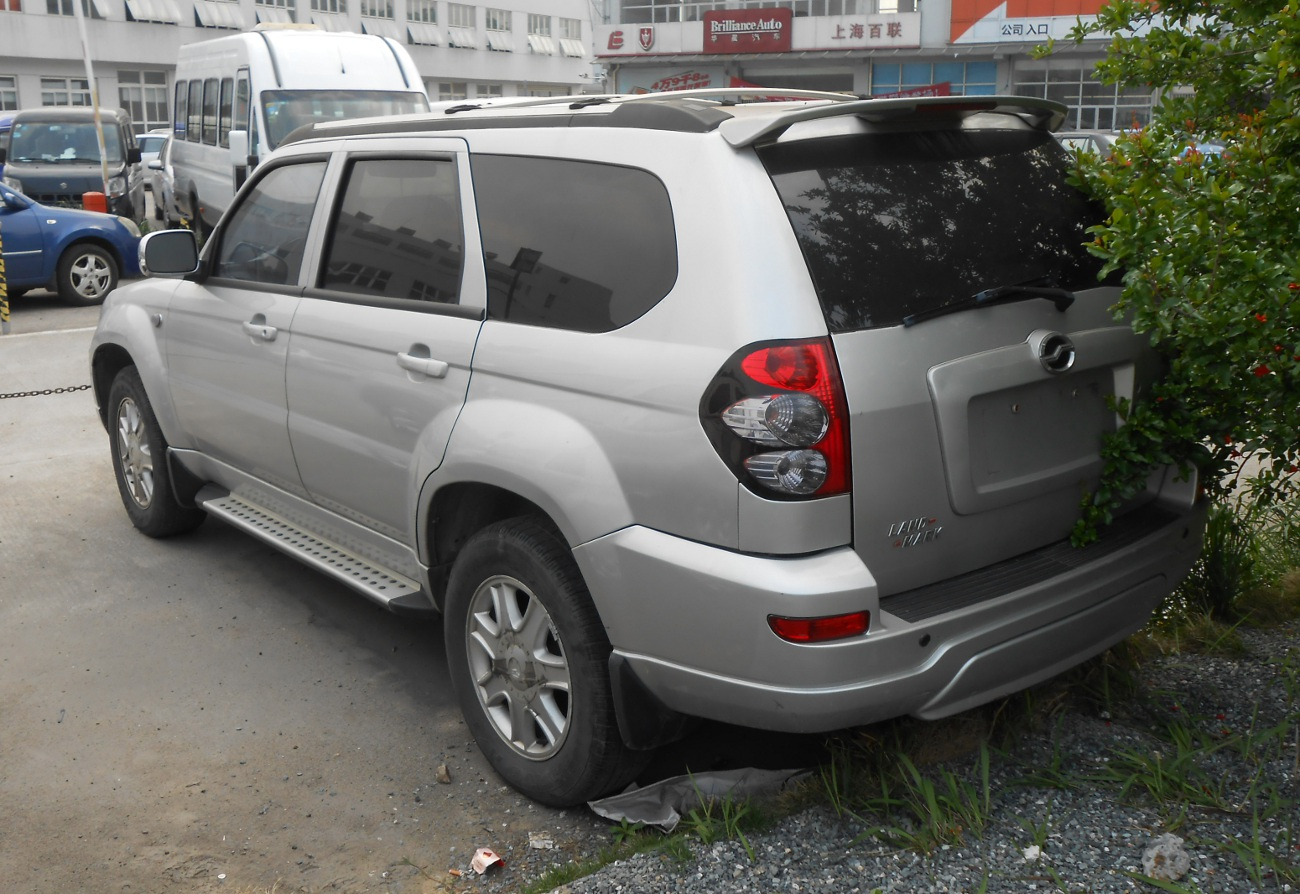
Zhongxing Landmark rear in China

Zhongxing is currently selling the Zhongxing Landmark in China, and also internationally in Asia, Africa, Iran (Bahman Motor) and Egypt. There are currently plans to sell various models in Europe.

Zxauto, in partnership with ZX Auto NA, is planning to export the Landmark SUV to the United States in the fourth quarter of 2008.

The Landmark was planned to be upgraded for the U.S. market to include more features, but the plan to expand to the U.S. market never succeeded, and production ceased in 2013. Zhongxing Landmark will be equipped with a 120 kW (160 hp) turbocharged and fuel injected engine and provide 25–30 miles per gallon fuel efficiency.
