= Zhongxing C3 Urban Ark =

Chinese CUV

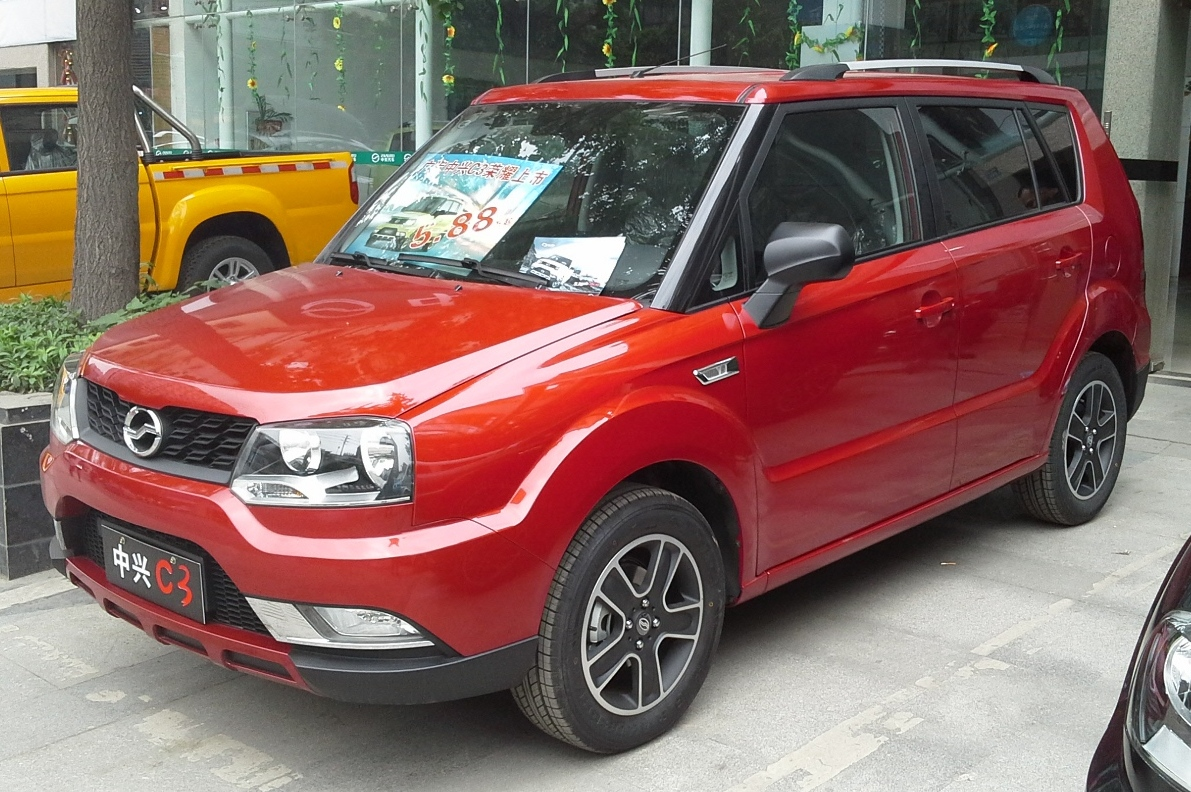

Overview
- Manufacturer: Hebei Zhongxing Automobile
- Also called: Zhongxing Urban Ark AUV Zhongxing Cross Van
- Production: 2013–2021
- Assembly: Baoding, Hebei

Body and chassis
- Body style: 5-door SUV
- Layout: Front-engine, two wheel drive

Powertrain
- Engine: Mitsubishi 4A91S 1.5L I4 petrol
- Transmission: 5-speed manual

Dimensions
- Wheelbase: 2,500 mm (98 in)
- Length: 4,140 mm (163 in)
- Width: 1,761 mm (69.3 in)
- Height: 1,675 mm (65.9 in)
- Curb weight: 1210kg

The Zhongxing C3 Urban Ark is a subcompact crossover SUV designed and developed by Hebei Zhongxing Automobile.

== Overview ==
The Zhongxing C3 Urban Ark was launched by Zhongxing Automobile on December 21, 2013, as their first entry into the crossover market.

Prices of the Zhongxing C3 Urban Ark starts at 57,800 yuan and ends at 58,800 yuan.

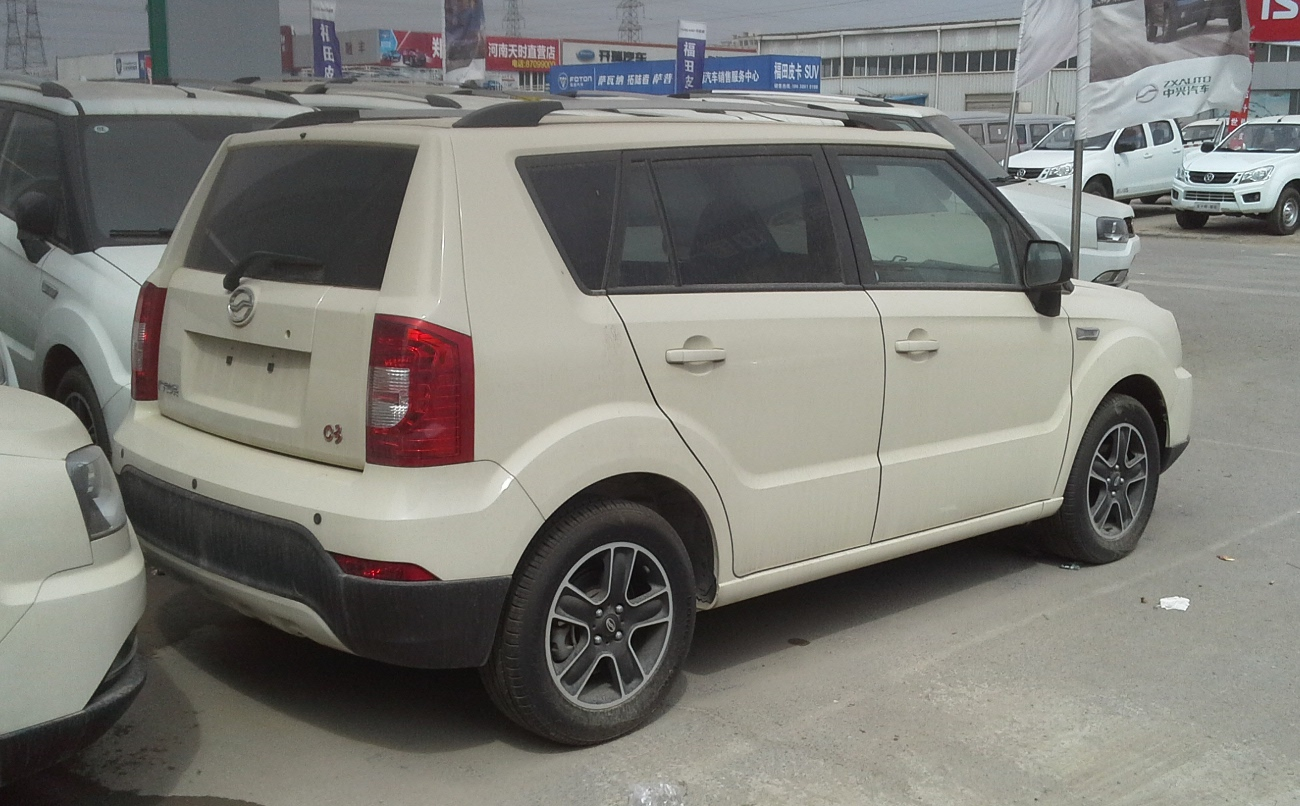
Zhongxing C3 Urban Ark rear in China

=== Powertrain ===
The only engine choice of the C3 Urban Ark is a Mitsubishi-sourced 1.5 liter gasoline engine producing 78 kW (104 hp) and 141 N·m of torque, mated to a 5-speed manual gearbox and powering the front wheels.

=== 2014 facelift ===
A more premium variant of the Zhongxing C3 Urban Ark was launched at the 2014 Guangzhou Auto Show as a concept called the Zhongxing GX3, featuring a restyled front and rear end.

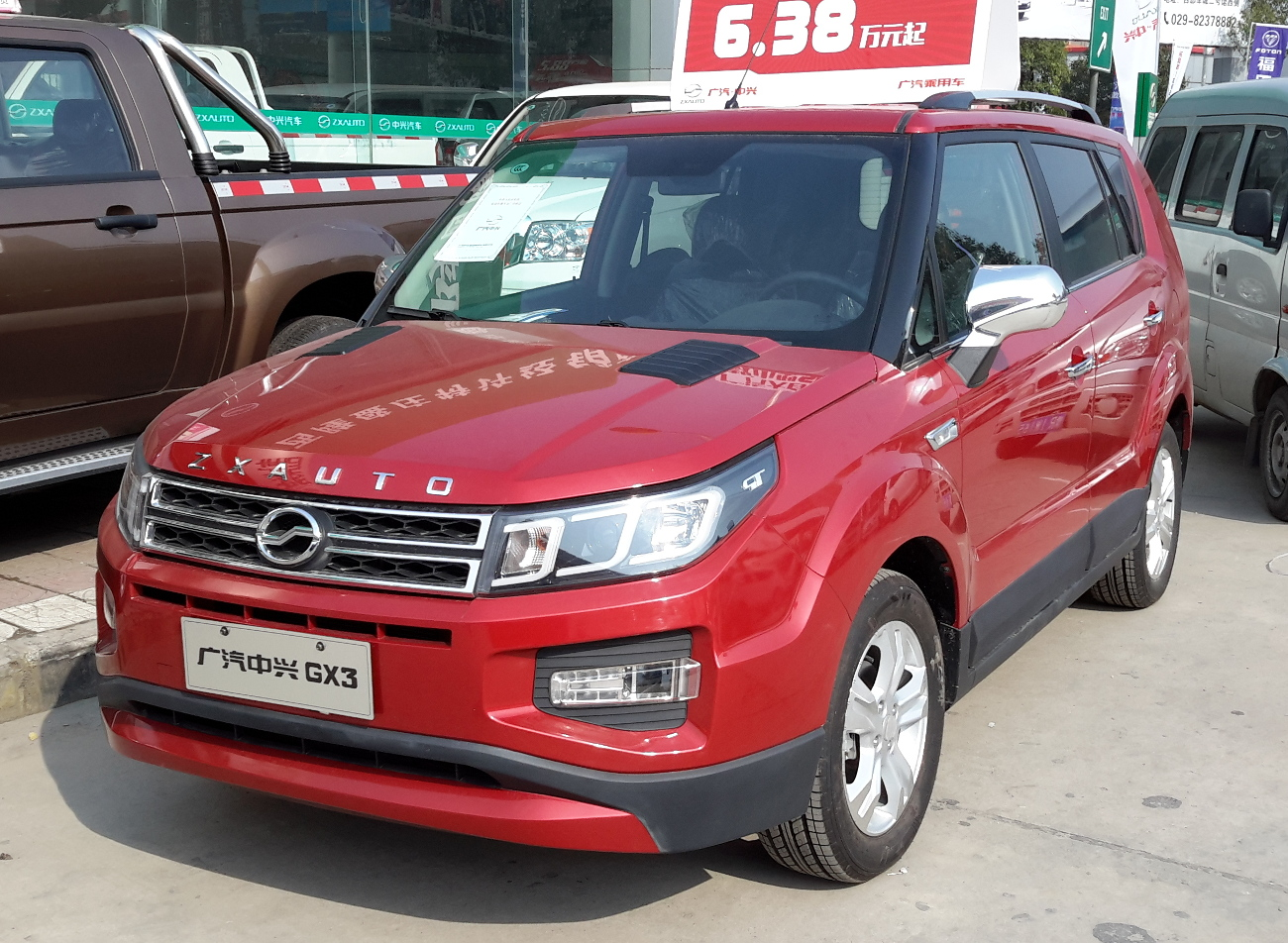
Zhongxing GX3 front

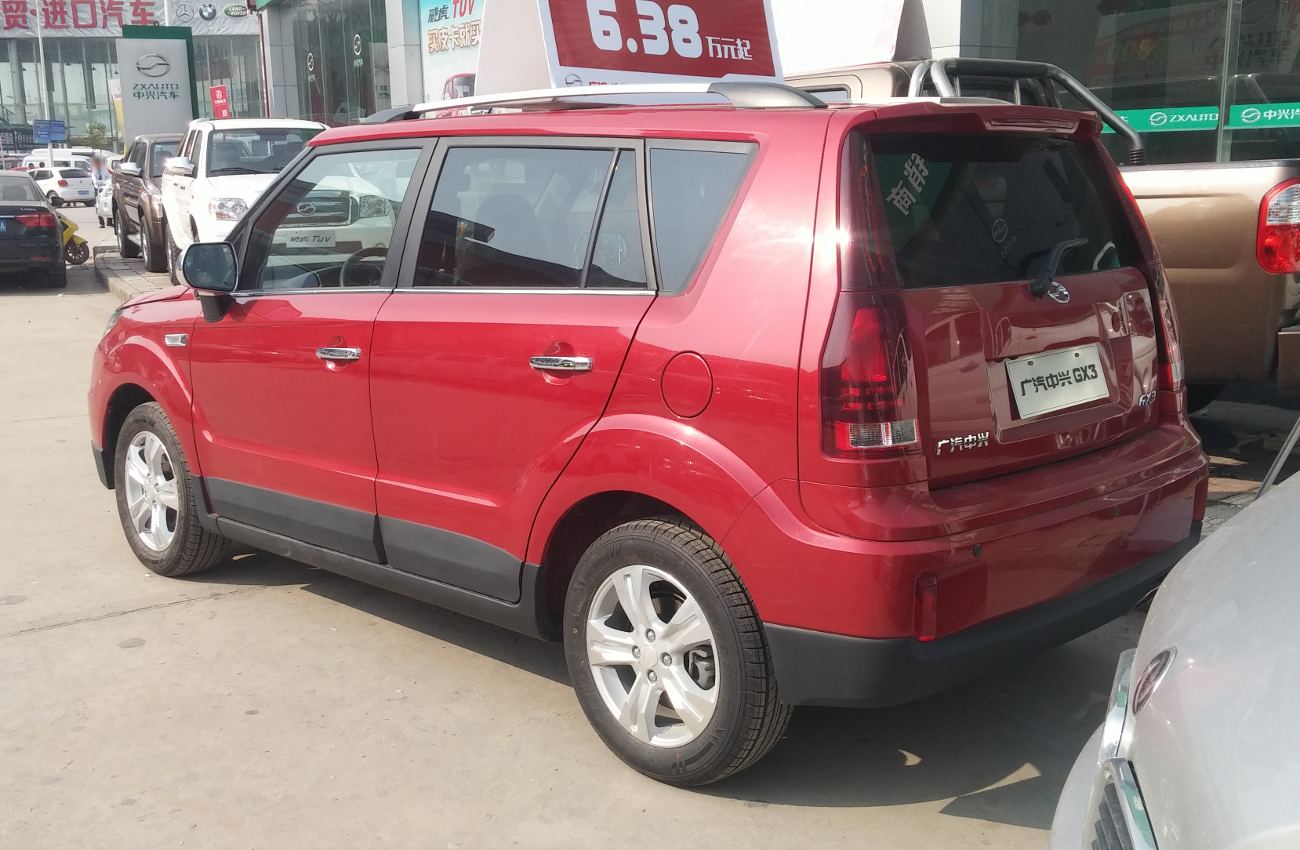
Zhongxing GX3 rear

=== Zhongxing Cross Van ===
The C3 Urban Ark received a facelift and rename in 2021 to Zhongxing Cross Van, featuring a redesigned front end.
