= ZX Auto =

Chinese motor vehicle manufacturer

Hebei Zhongxing Automobile Co Ltd
- Type: Joint venture
- Industry: Automotive
- Founded: 1999; 27 years ago
- Headquarters: Baoding, Hebei, China
- Products: Automobiles
- Number of employees: 2,800

Chinese name
- Simplified Chinese: 中兴汽车
- Traditional Chinese: 中興汽車
Transcriptions
Standard Mandarin
- Hanyu Pinyin: Zhōngxìng Qìchē
- Website: zxauto.com.cn

Hebei Zhongxing Automobile Co Ltd, branded as ZX Auto, is a Chinese producer of SUVs and pick-up trucks. Co-owned by Tianye Automobile Group Co Ltd and Taiwan Unite Leading Co, it was established in 1999 and exports to the Middle East, Southeast Asia, Africa, and Central and South America. The company claims a per year production capacity of 110,000 units – a figure that could conflate engines and whole vehicles.

== History ==
In the latter half of the 2000s, the company sought access to the US market with the help of US company Capital Corp, and it participated in the 2007 National Automobile Dealers Association convention. While US sales were touted as late as 2008, the company has yet to sell its models in developed countries. Products are available in some EU member states, however.

During the Libyan civil war, only 6 ZX Auto Grand Tiger pick-up trucks found their way into rebel hands and were turned into technicals replete with mounted guns. As the conflict progressed, pro-Qaddafi forces also began using pick-ups after NATO aerial bombing raids disabled their armoured vehicles. Some of the ZX Auto Grand Tiger pickups used in this civil war may have been branded as Tayo Auto Grandhiland. When fighting commenced in 2011, there were at least 15,000 ZX Auto pick-ups already in the country.

Some sales are to Chinese state organizations.

In 2014, the company removed a reference to co-ownership by Taiwan Unite Leading Co and Hebei Tianye Automobile Group Co Ltd from its website. Website modifications also included changing the year of the company's formation from 1999 to 1949 although 1999 remained referenced as the year ZX Auto was "transformed into a joint venture company."

== Production bases and facilities ==
ZX Auto has two vehicle factories and a R&D center. While one factory and the R&D center are likely located in Baoding, Hebei, where the company is based, the second factory may be in Changchun as ZX Auto has part-ownership of a production base in this city with Changling Group Co Ltd. In late 2010, it started construction of a new plant in Yichang, Hubei, that will build SUVs and sedans. As of late 2014, the company does reference a Baoding production base on its website claiming a production capacity of 50,000 units.

Some of its products are assembled in small, overseas factories from knock-down kits, and ZX Auto states that the majority of its exports are in the form of these kits. The companies that own these factories and do the final assembly are not necessarily affiliated with ZX Auto. Such assembly has commenced in Egypt, Iran, and Jordan, where a 5,000 unit/year factory was under construction as of 2008. As of 2011, the company hopes new knock-down factories will spring up in Mexico and Malaysia. In Poland, a pick-up, the Grand Tiger, is produced and sold by Polish company POL-MOT Warfama. Probably assembled from knock-down kits, Polish models sport an engine that complies with EU regulations.

== Models ==
=== Current ===
- ZX Grand Tiger (小老虎) pick-up
- ZX Weihu (威虎) pick-up
- ZX Terralord (领主) pick-up
- ZX Weishi (威狮)/ G9 pick-up

=== Former ===
- ZX Admiral SUV and pick-up
- ZX Chanling (昌铃) pick-up
- ZX Landmark SUV
- ZX C3 Urban Ark CUV/ ZX Cross Van
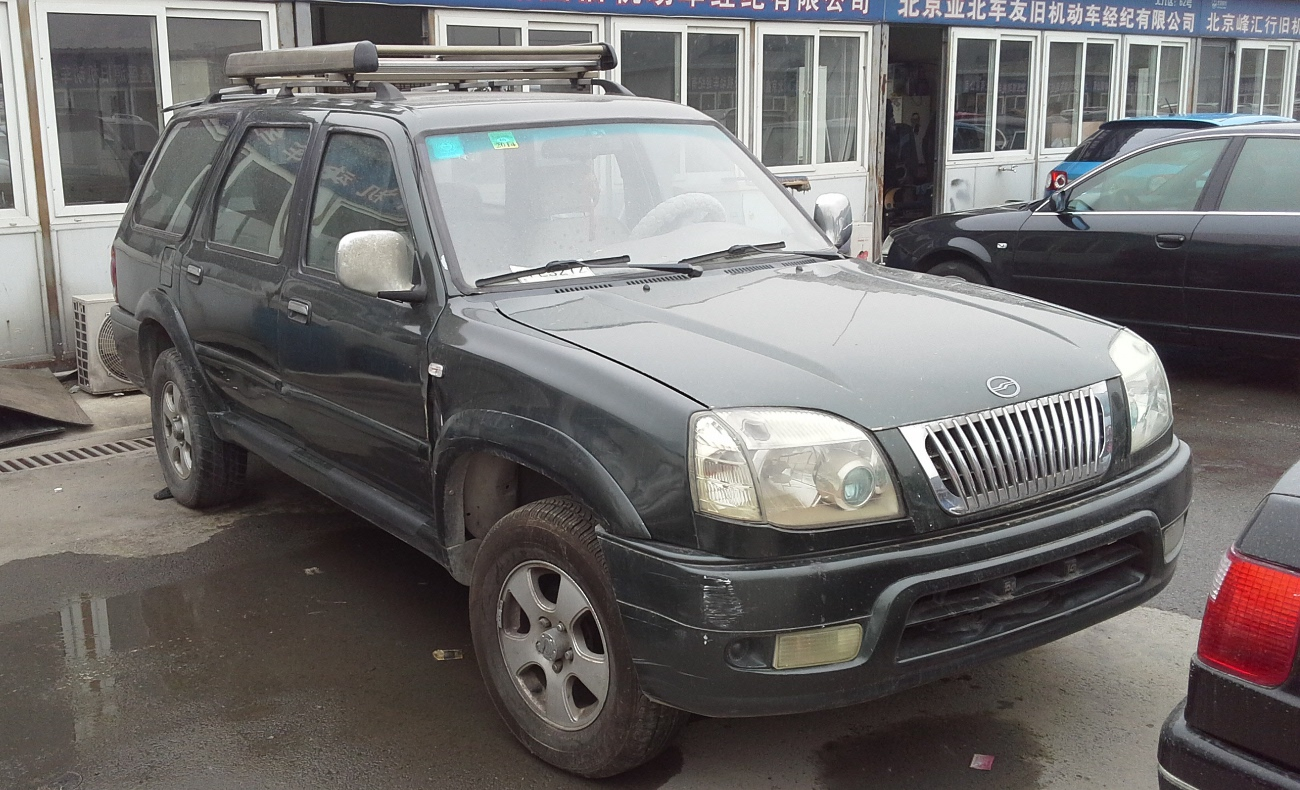
Zhongxing Admiral

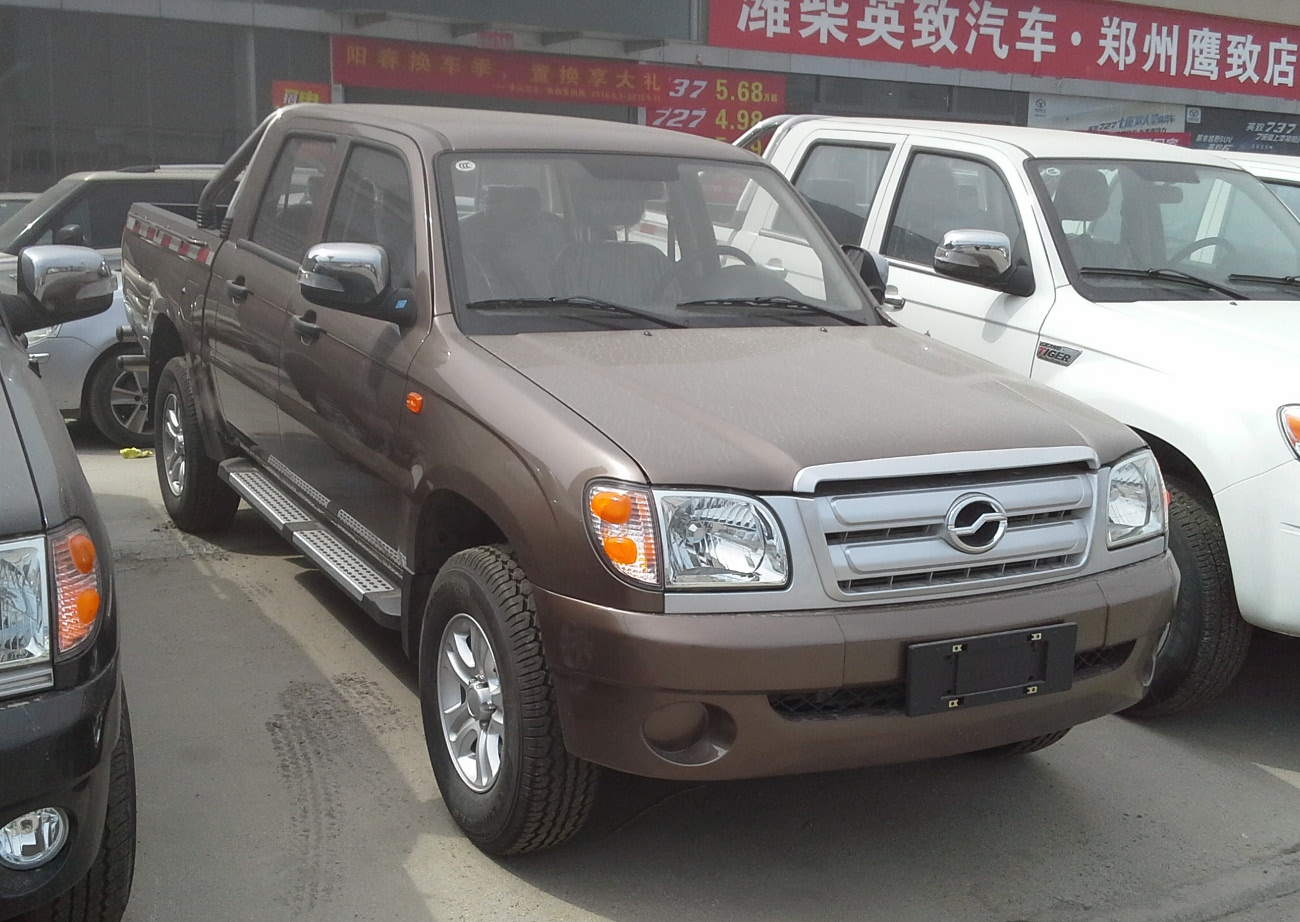
Zhongxing Grand Tiger

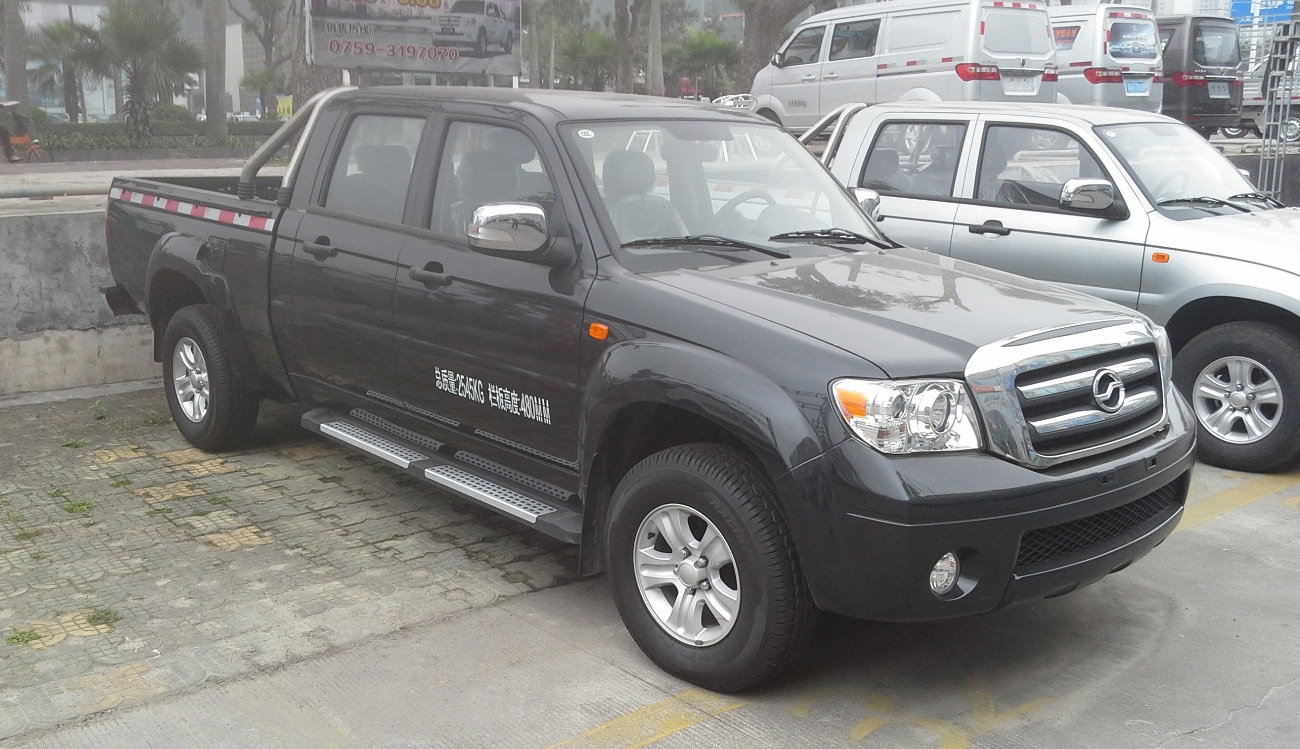
Zhongxing Weihu (Grand Tiger TUV)

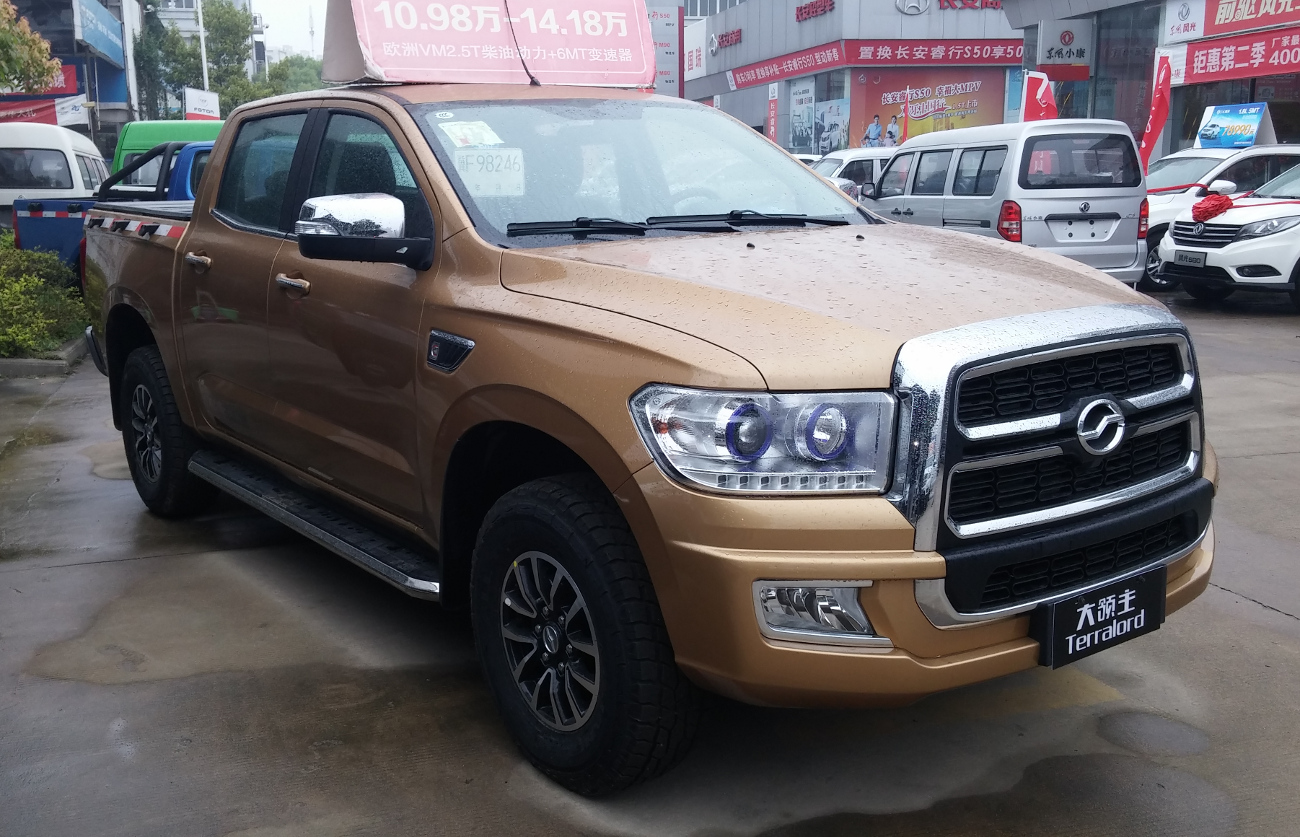
Zhongxing Terralord

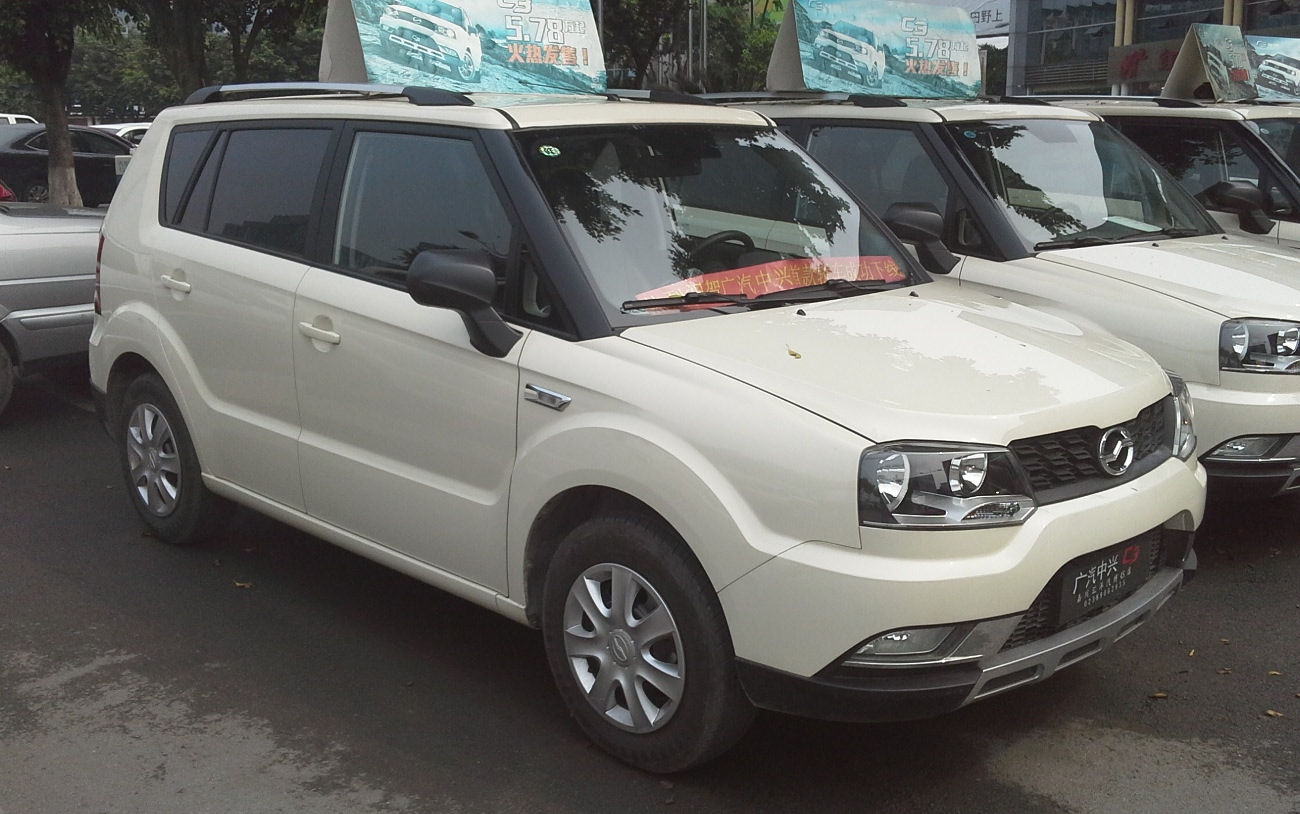
ZX C3 Urban Ark

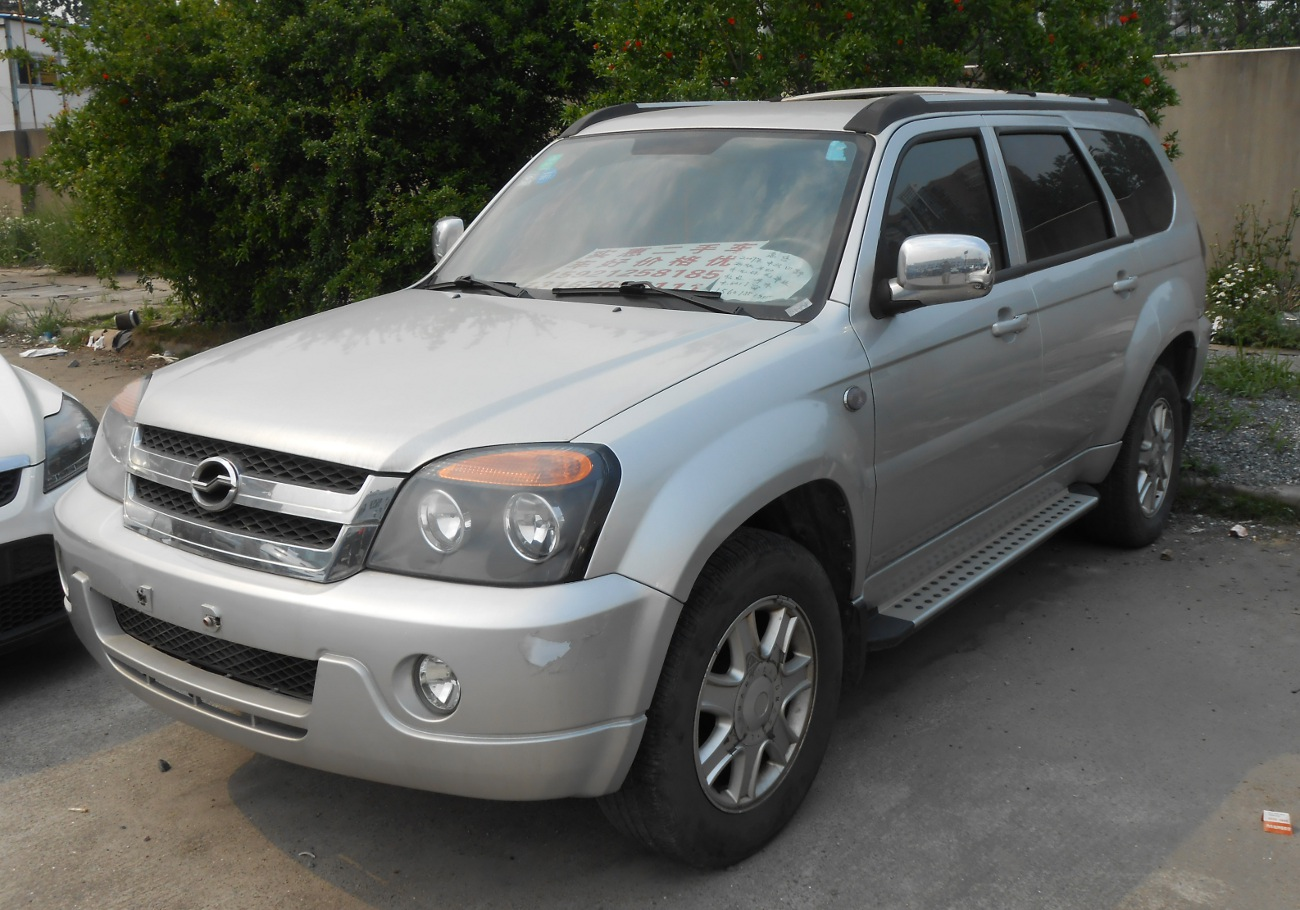
ZX Landmark

== See also ==
- List of automobile manufacturers of China
