= Zhongxing Grand Tiger =

Chinese pickup truck

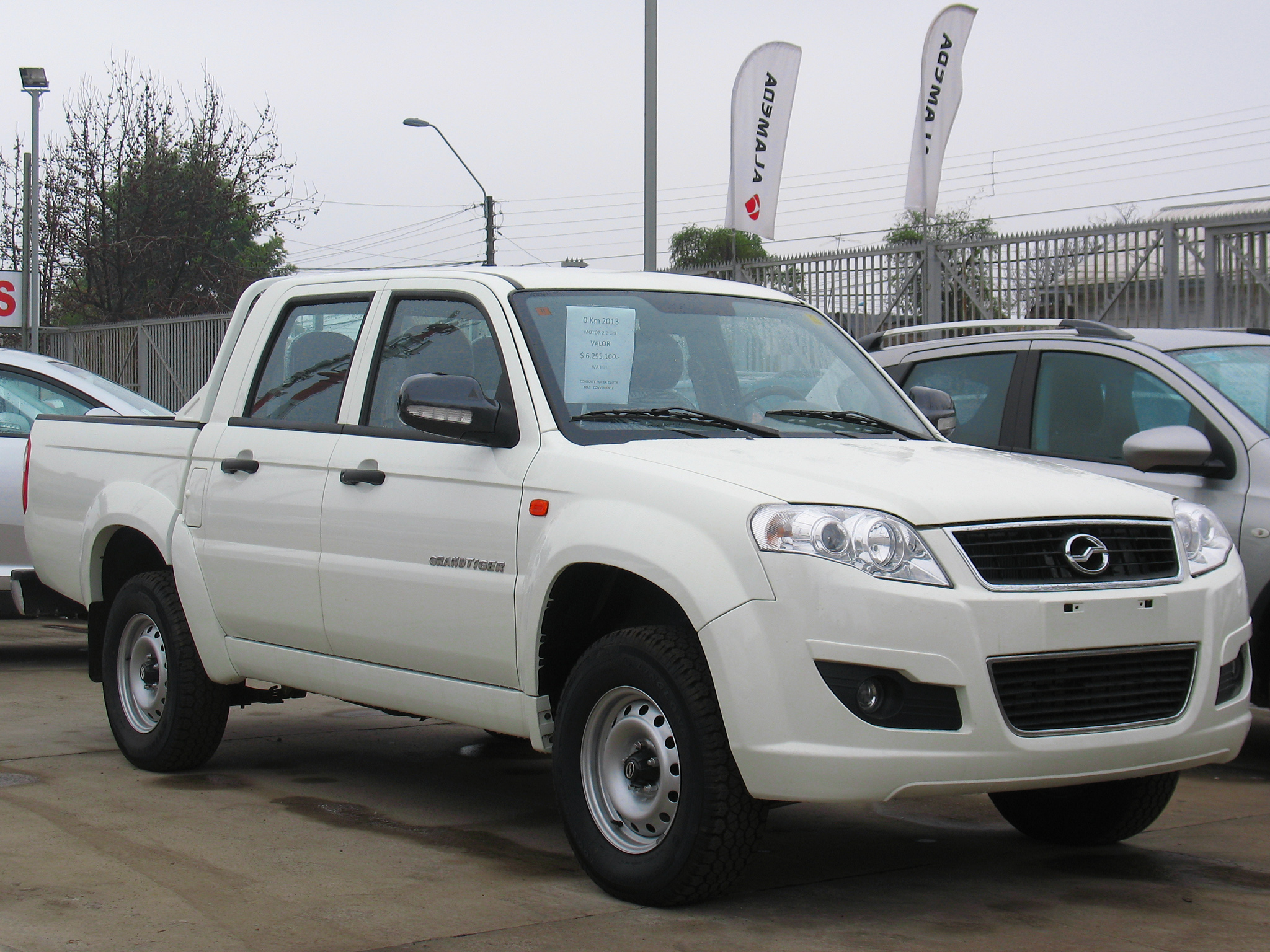

Overview
- Also called: Innoson Carrier 4WD; Bahman Capra (Iran); BAIC Beijing Grand Tiger
- Production: 2012–present
- Assembly: Baoding, Hebei

Body and chassis
- Body style: 2-door Pickup truck 4-door Pickup truck
- Layout: Front-engine, rear wheel drive four wheel drive

Powertrain
- Engine: 2.2 L I4 petrol 2.4 L 4G64 I4 petrol 2.5 L I4 turbo diesel 2.8 L I4 turbo diesel
- Transmission: 5-speed manual

Dimensions
- Wheelbase: 3,395 mm (133.7 in)
- Length: 5,545 mm (218.3 in)
- Width: 1,830 mm (72 in)
- Height: 1,770 mm (70 in)

The Zhongxing Grand Tiger (Chinese: 中兴小老虎) is a series of mid-size pickup trucks designed and developed by Hebei Zhongxing Automobile. The Zhongxing Grand Tiger was also sold in some markets such as Africa, South America, Caucasus, the Middle East, Russia and Eastern Europe.

== Overview ==
Zhongxing revealed the Zhongxing Grand Tiger in the Chinese market based on the Zhongxing Weihu platform as the entry-level model of the whole Zhongxing Grand Tiger series, with prices starting at 56,000 yuan and ending at 75,800 yuan. Despite being called the Grand Tiger throughout the series in export markets, in China, the Zhongxing Grand Tiger is only the name for the entry-level model of the whole series.

The Grand Tiger was introduced to Australia in 2013, distributed by major Perth car dealer John Hughes. Offered with the SAIC-Mitsubishi-sourced 4G64 engine (which was also shared with the Great Wall V240), it was later offered with a 2.5L four-cylinder turbodiesel. Starting at AU$16,990 for the cab-chassis two-wheel drive model, it was the cheapest ute available in Australia upon introduction. CarsGuide noted in its review that it was "so much like the engineering in the Great Wall [V240] that it's more a sister vehicle," adding that it was "good value-for-money and capable," though they criticised the weakness of the 2.4L petrol engine. The brand was discontinued in 2015 after sluggish sales.

6,000 Grand Tigers were also exported to Libya in 2009, which marked ZX Auto's largest single-batch export order up until that point. Several examples notably saw service in the First Libyan Civil War as technicals, modified by anti-Gaddafi forces to serve in battle.

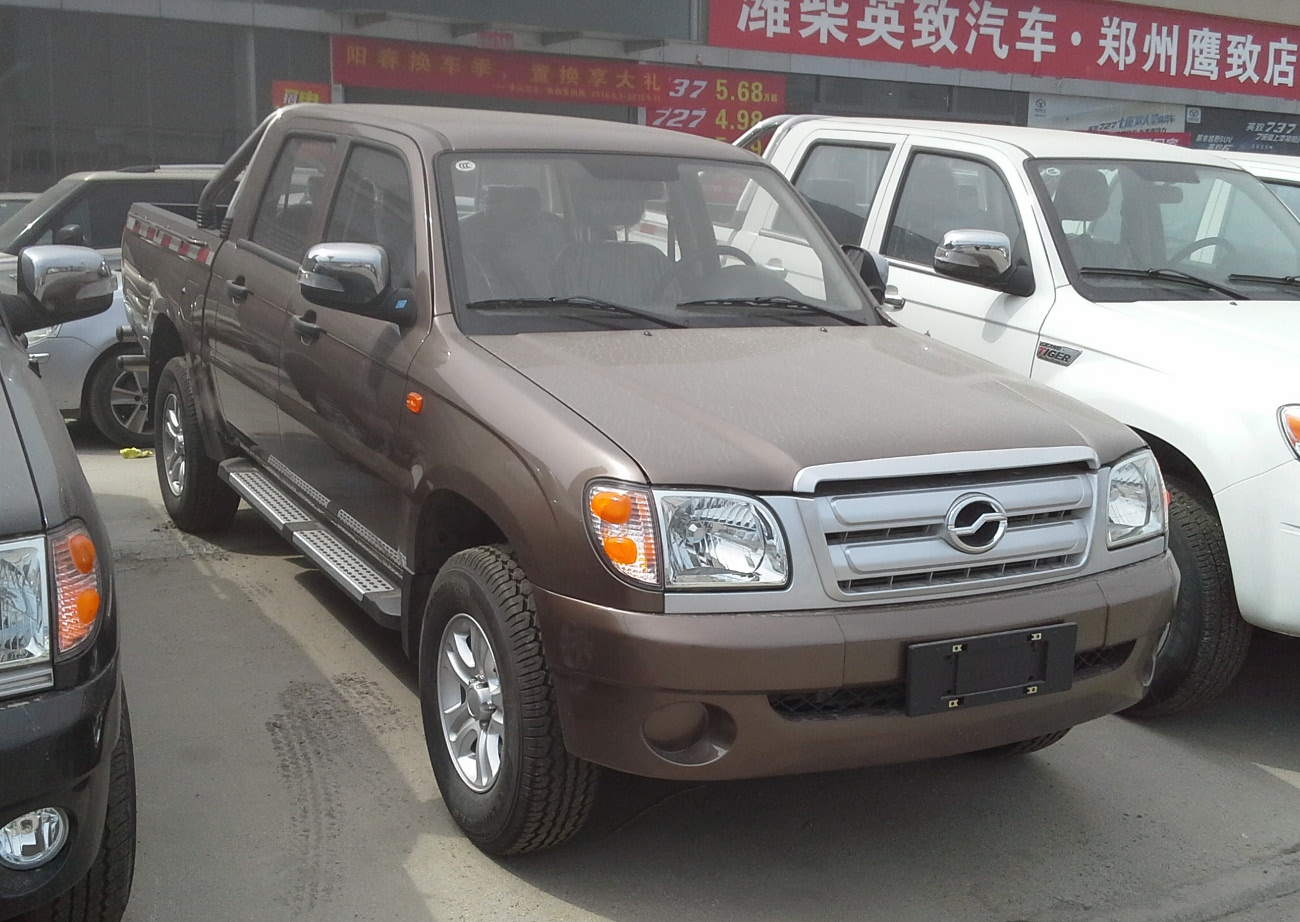
Zhongxing Grand Tiger front quarter

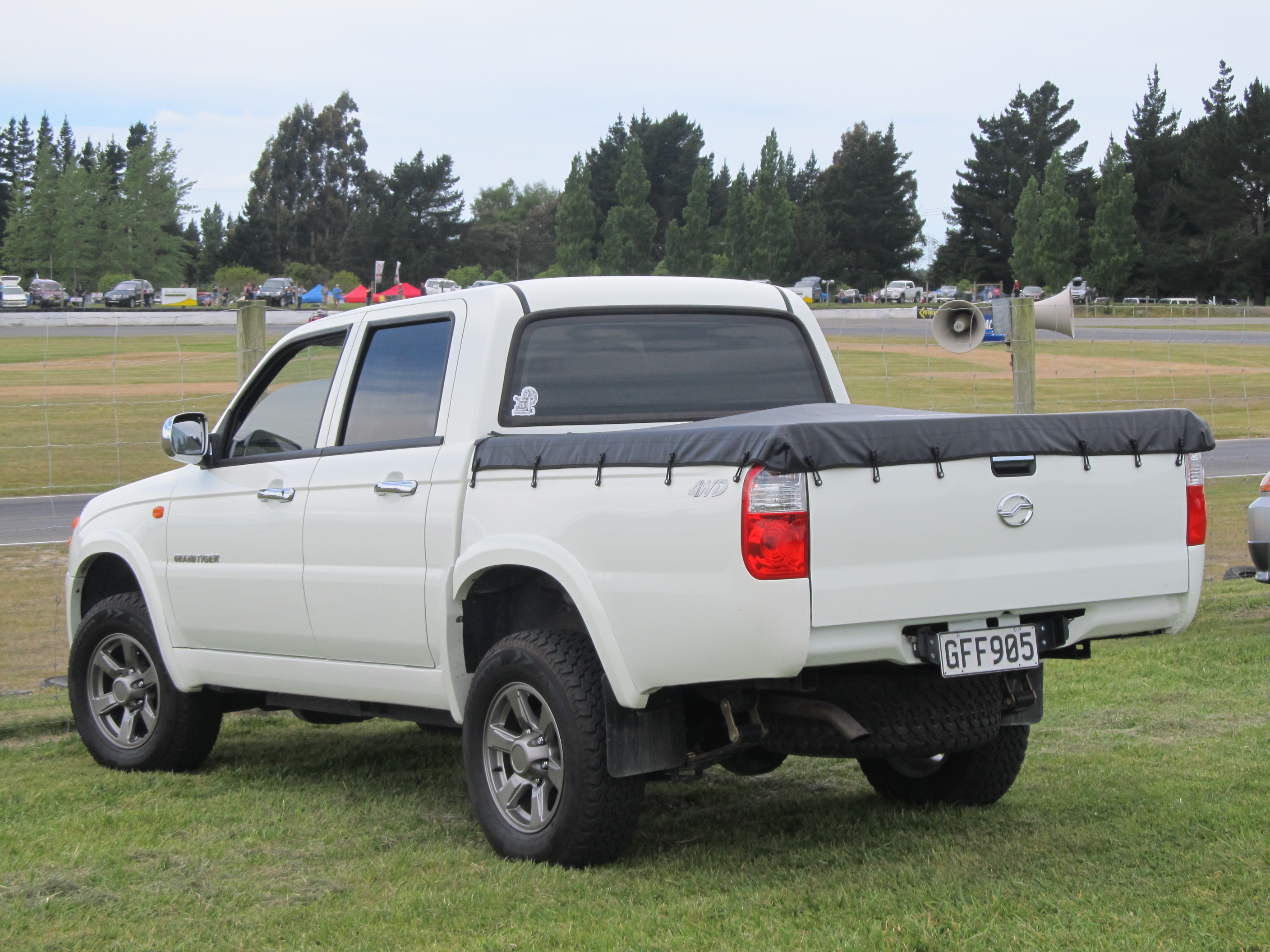
Zhongxing Grand Tiger rear quarter view

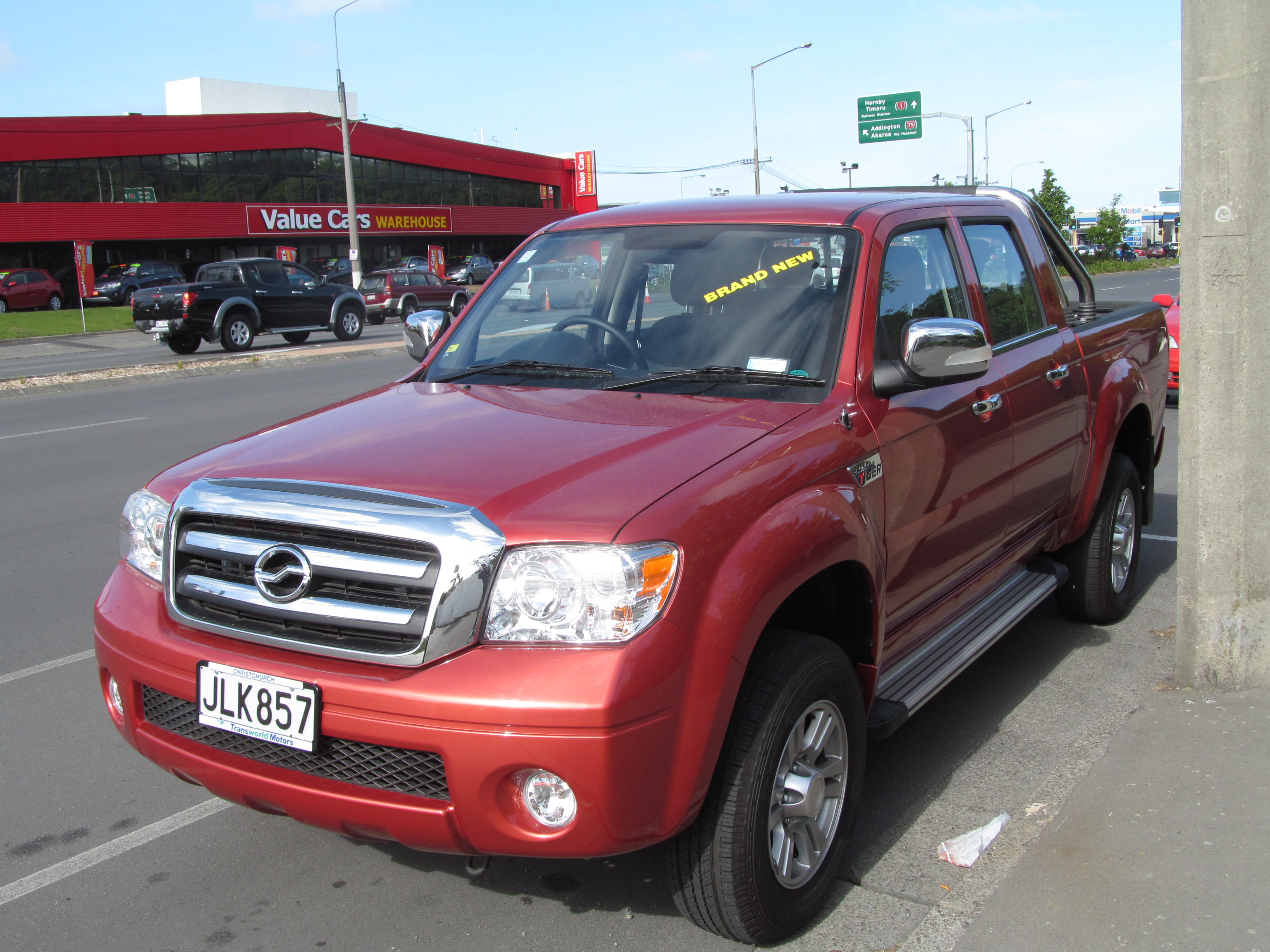
Zhongxing Grand Tiger

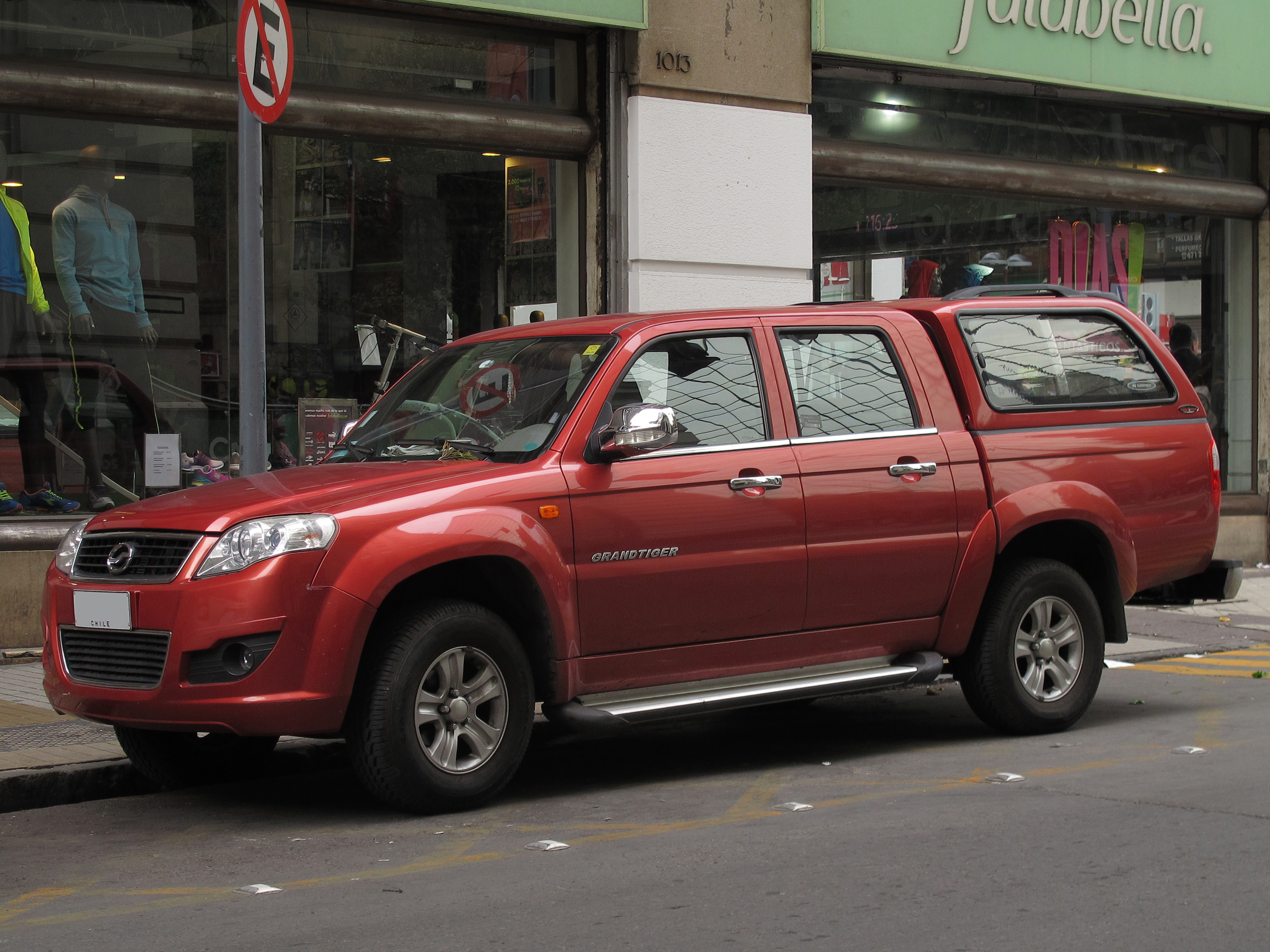
Zhongxing Grand Tiger facelift

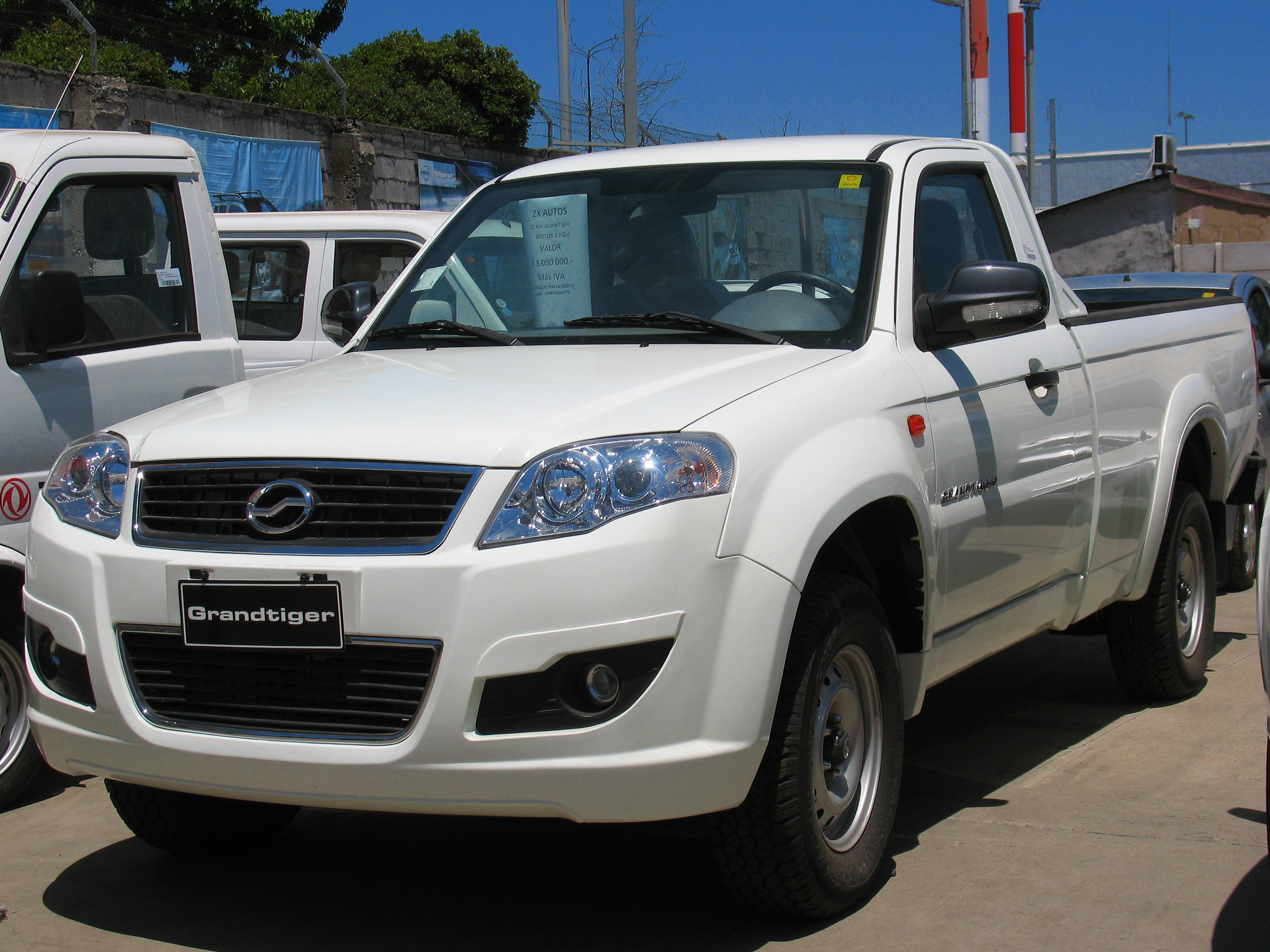
Zhongxing Grand Tiger regular cab facelift

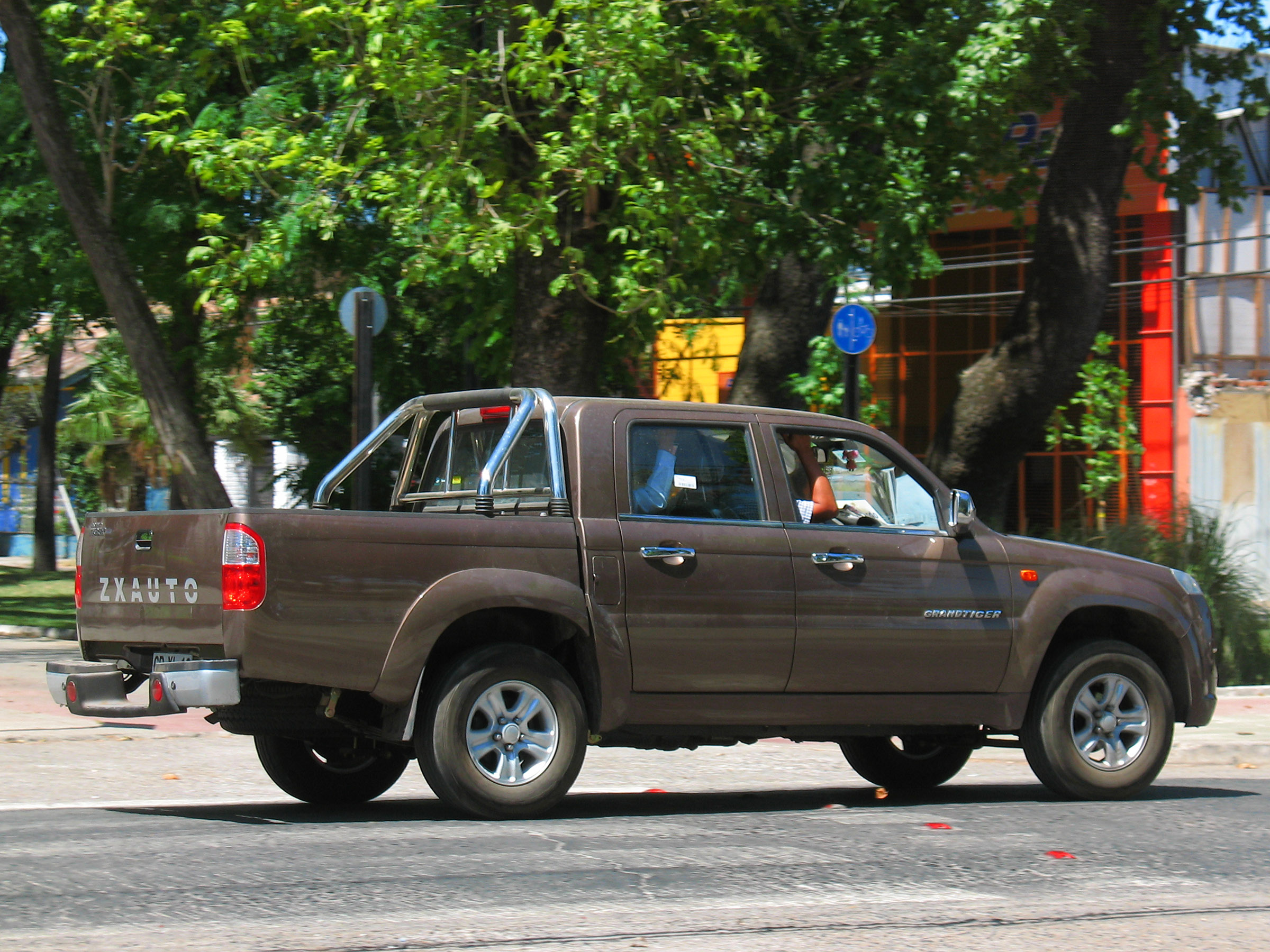
Zhongxing Grand Tiger facelift crew cab rear

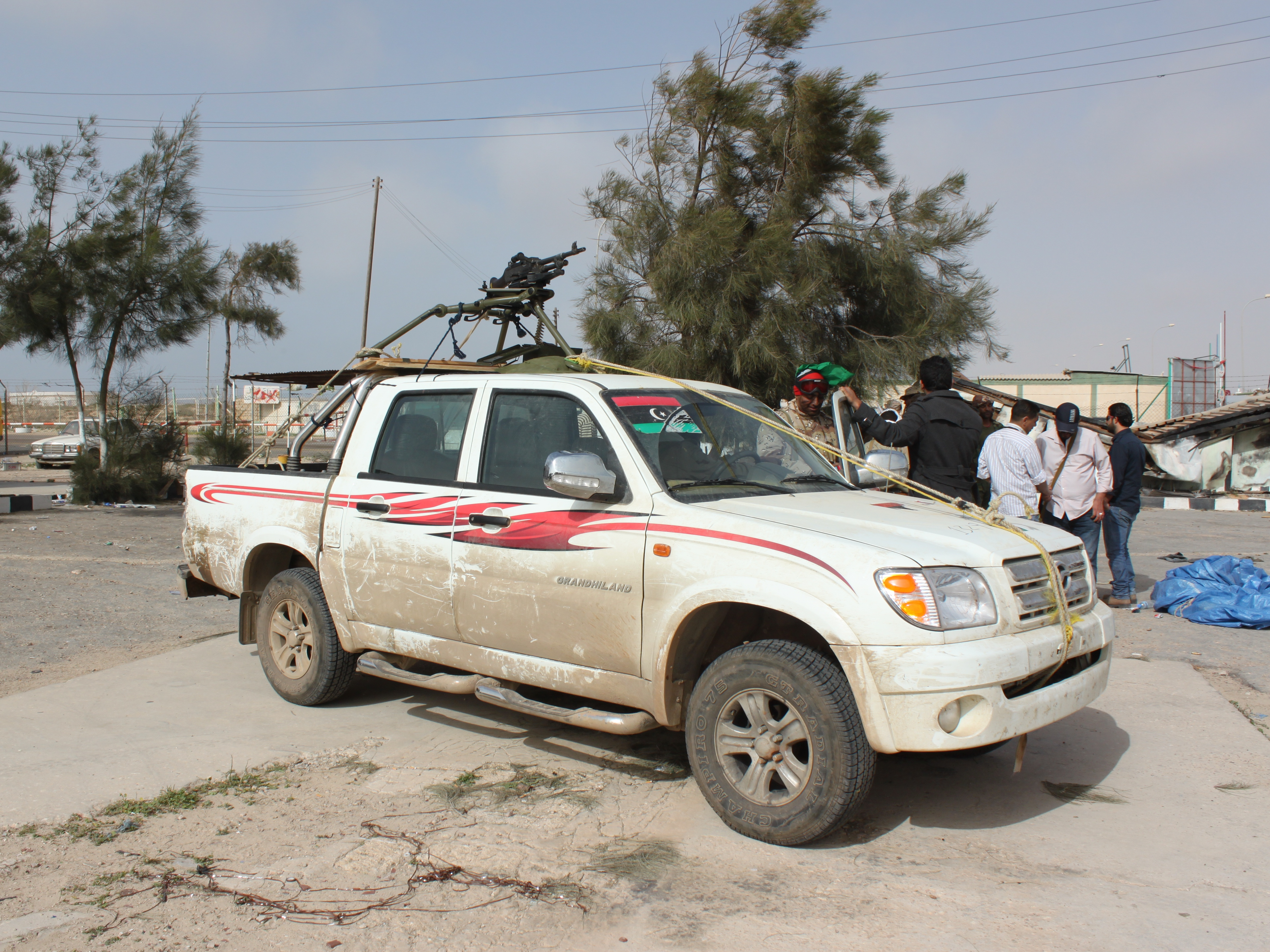
Libyan Zhongxing Grand Tiger technical

== Zhongxing Weihu G3 ==
The updated Zhongxing Weihu G3 (威虎 G3) pickup truck was launched on the Chinese car market in June 2012 with prices starting at 61,800 yuan and ending at 99,800 yuan. The Weihu G3 is a more premium version of the standard Grand Tiger pickup truck, and sold alongside the entry level Zhongxing Grand Tiger in China. In foreign markets, the Zhongxing Grand Tiger G3 is the facelift version of the Zhongxing Grand Tiger.

== Zhongxing Grand Tiger TUV (Zhongxing Weihu) ==
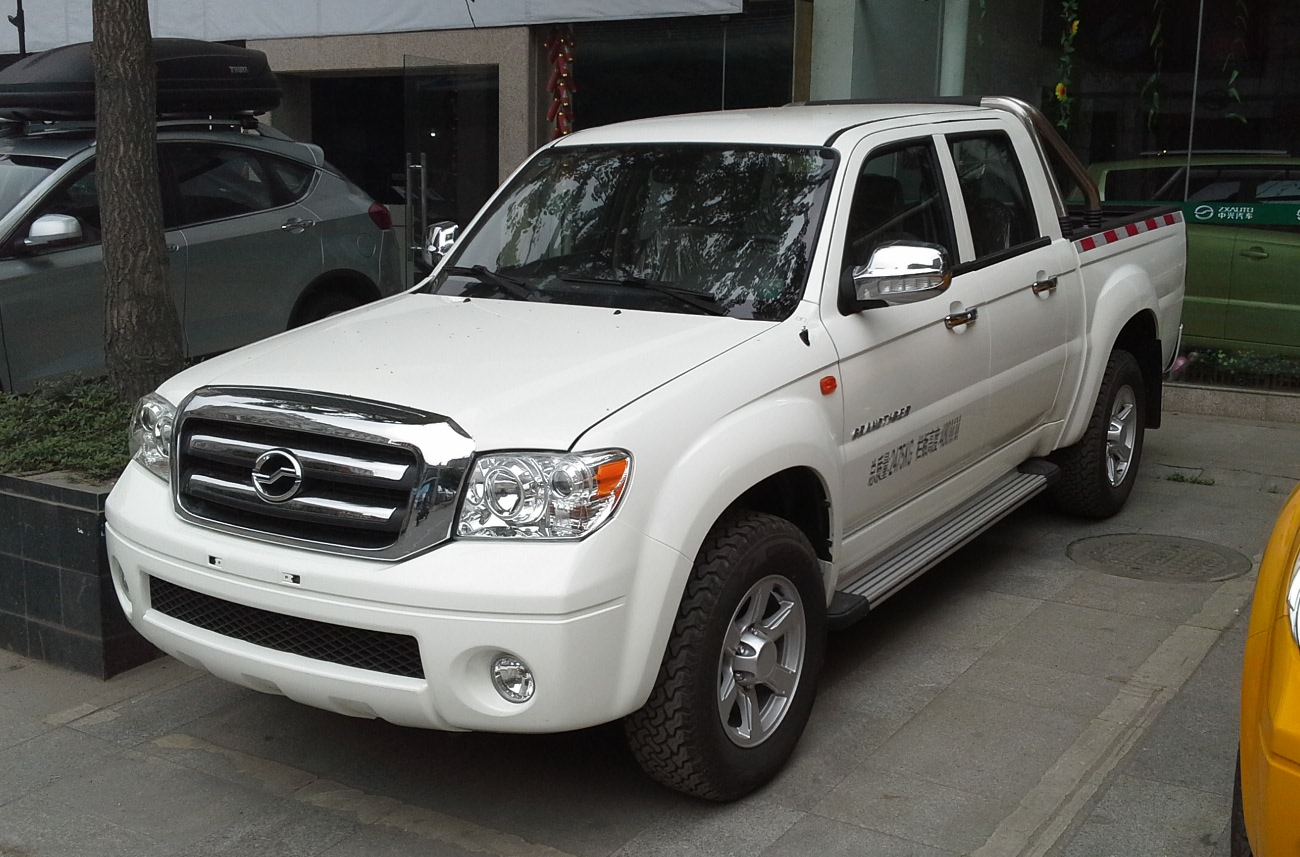
Zhongxing Grand Tiger TUV (Zhongxing Weihu)

The Zhongxing Grand Tiger TUV or Zhongxing Weihu (威虎) pickup truck was launched on the Chinese car market in August 2013 with prices starting at 75,800 yuan and ending at 102,800 yuan. The Grand Tiger TUV is an even more premium version of the standard Grand Tiger pickup truck positioned above the Zhongxing Weihu G3. According to Zhongxing, TUV stands for Tiger Utility Vehicle. The Zhongxing Grand Tiger TUV is available with two engine options from Isuzu including a 2.5 liter turbo diesel engine producing 143 hp (107 kW) and 340 N⋅m (251 lb⋅ft) of torque, and a 2.8 liter turbo diesel engine producing 95 hp (71 kW) and 225 N⋅m (166 lb⋅ft) of torque, both mated to a 5-speed manual gearbox.
