= Higer Longwei =

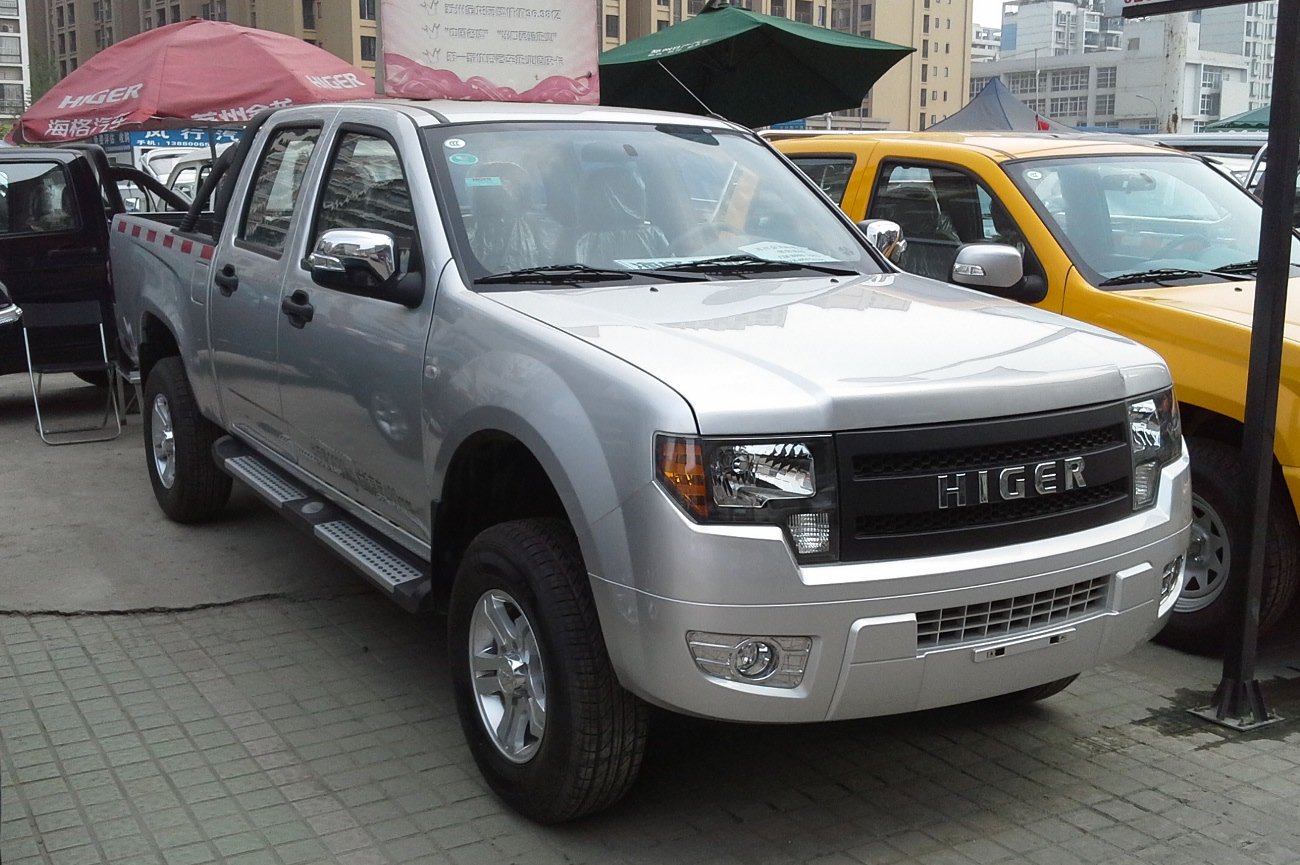

Overview
- Manufacturer: Higer
- Also called: Shaanxi Tongjia Longrui
- Production: 2013–
- Model years: 2013–2015
- Assembly: Suzhou, Jiangsu

Body and chassis
- Class: Mid-size pickup truck
- Body style: 2-door pickup 4-door pickup

Powertrain
- Engine: 2.5L DK4B1 (Diesel); Mitsubishi 4G69S4N petrol 2.4L (Petrol)
- Transmission: 5-speed manual

Dimensions
- Wheelbase: 3,025–3,380 mm (119.1–133.1 in)
- Length: 5,160 mm (203.1 in)
- Width: 1,720 mm (67.72 in)
- Height: 1,790 mm (70.47 in)

The Higer Longwei (Chinese: 龙威) is a mid-size pickup truck manufactured by Chinese automotive brand Higer. Higer is a brand under Higer Bus, a subsidiary of the King Long Group, which is the largest bus maker in China.

== Overview ==
Launched in March 2015, the Higer Longwei midsize pickup is available with two engine options, including a 2.4 liter four-cylinder petrol engine producing 136 hp (101 kW) and 200 N⋅m (148 lb⋅ft) of torque, and a 2.8 liter four-cylinder turbo-diesel engine producing 102 hp (76 kW) and 220 N⋅m (162 lb⋅ft) of torque, both either mated to a five-speed manual gearbox or a five-speed automatic gearbox. The standard layout is rear wheel drive, and four-wheel drive is optional.

The Higer Longwei is also rebadged as the Shaanxi Tongjia Longrui (龙锐) sold under the Shaanxi Automobile Group.

== Controversy ==
Since its production, controversy has arisen due to the front fascia design of the Higer Longwei bearing a likeness to the twelfth generation Ford F-150, making it an unlicensed clone.
