= Higer Yujun =

Chinese pickup truck

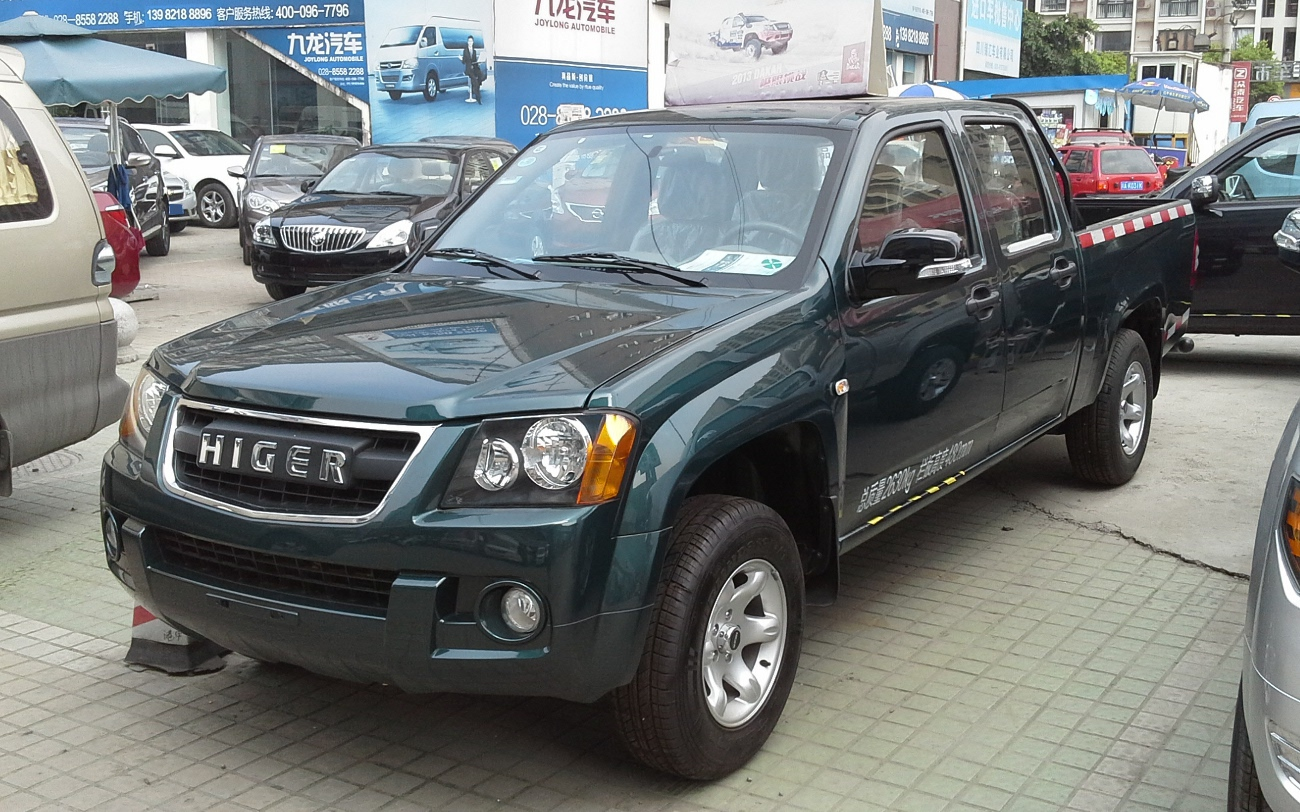

Overview
- Manufacturer: Higer
- Also called: Higer H5P; Zhongxing Chanling
- Production: 2011–2014
- Model years: 2011–2014
- Assembly: Suzhou, Jiangsu

Body and chassis
- Class: Mid-size pickup truck
- Body style: 2-door pickup 4-door pickup
- Related: Isuzu Faster

Powertrain
- Engine: JM491Q-ME 2.2L petrol I4; 4D25 diesel turbocharged 2.4L I4; 4JB1TI diesel turbocharged 2.8L I4; 4JB1TC diesel turbocharged 2.8L I4
- Transmission: 5-speed manual

Dimensions
- Wheelbase: 3,025–3,380 mm (119.1–133.1 in)
- Length: 5,030–5,455 mm (198.0–214.8 in)
- Width: 1,720 mm (67.72 in)
- Height: 1,710 mm (67.32 in)

The Higer Yujun (Chinese: 御骏) is a mid-size pickup truck manufactured by Chinese automotive brand Higer. Higer is a brand under Higer Bus, a subsidiary of the King Long Group, which is the largest bus maker in China.

== Overview ==
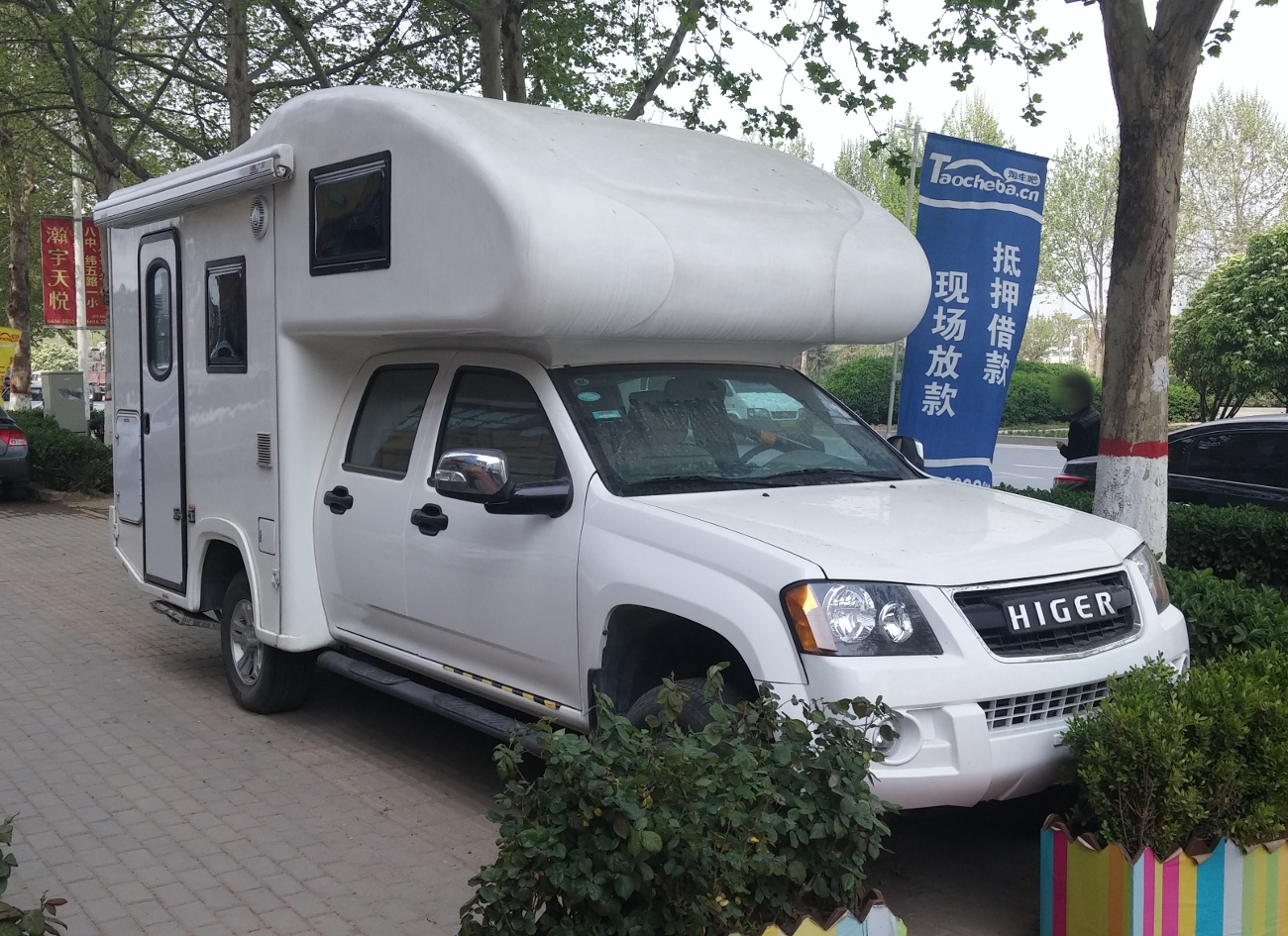
Higer Yujun camper in China

Launched in 2011, the Higer Longwei midsize pickup was built on the same platform as the Isuzu D-Max, available with four engine options, including a 2.2 liter four-cylinder petrol engine, a 2.4 liter four-cylinder diesel engine, and two 2.8 liter four-cylinder turbo-diesel engines, all mated to a five-speed manual gearbox. The standard layout is rear wheel drive, and four-wheel drive is optional. Prices of the Higer Yujun starts at 71,800 yuan and ends at 92,800 yuan.

The Higer Yujun also bears a resemblance to the Holden Colorado RC styling-wise, which was sold from 2009 to 2012.
