= Higer Bus =

Chinese manufacturer of buses and coaches

Higer Bus Company Limited 海格客车

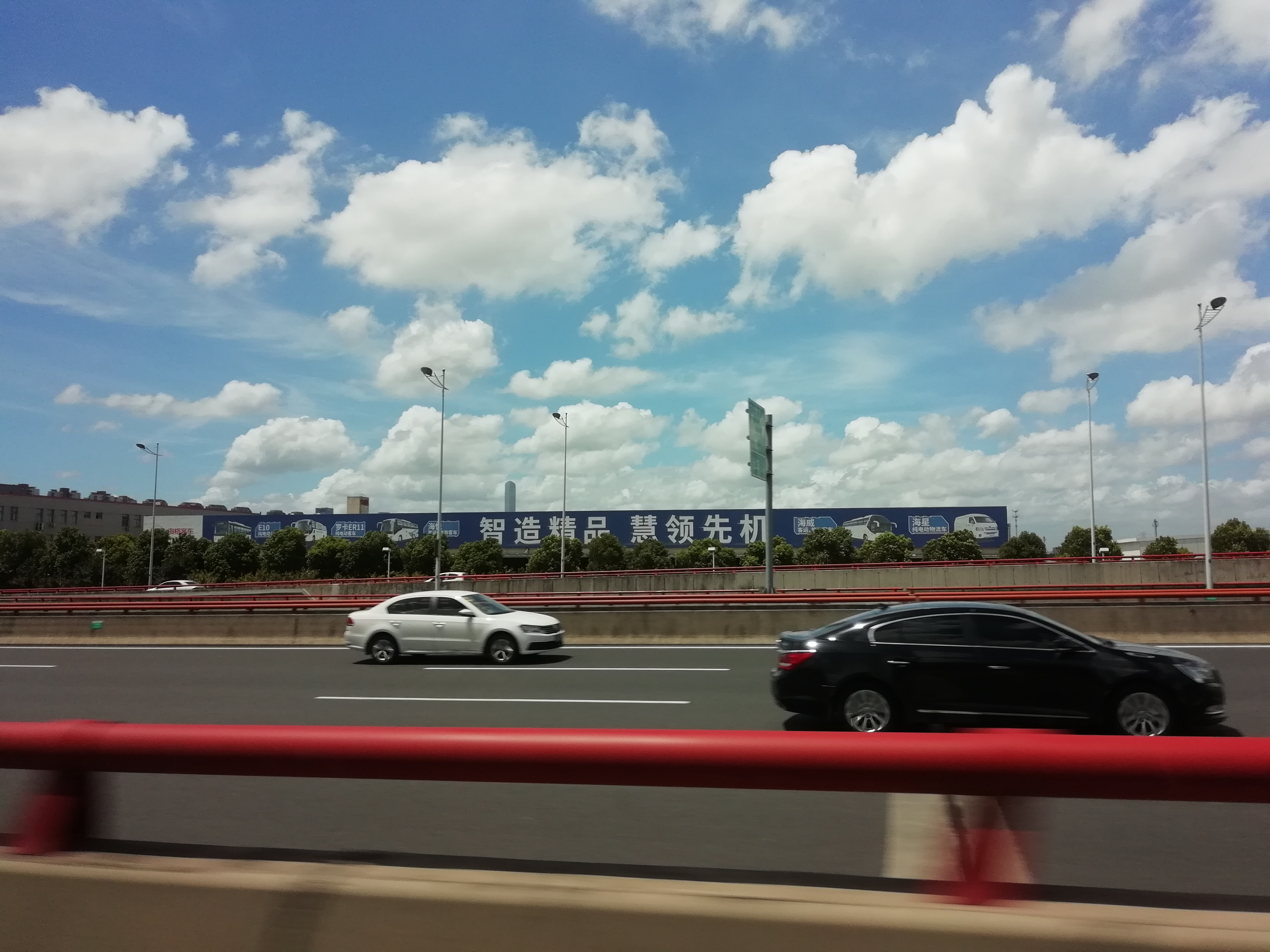
- Headquarters of Higer Bus
- Industry: Automotive
- Founded: 1998; 28 years ago
- Headquarters: Suzhou, Jiangsu, China
- Area served: Worldwide
- Products: Buses and coaches Commercial and tourism vehicles
- Revenue: RMB11.7 billion (2015)
- Number of employees: 6,000+
- Parent: King Long
- Website: en.higer.com

Higer Bus
- Traditional Chinese: 金龍聯合汽車工業（蘇州）有限公司
- Simplified Chinese: 金龙联合汽车工业（苏州）有限公司
Transcriptions
Standard Mandarin
- Hanyu Pinyin: Jīnlóng liánhé qìchē gōngyè (Sūzhōu) yǒuxiàn gōngsī

Trading name
- Traditional Chinese: 海格客車
- Simplified Chinese: 海格客车
- Literal meaning: Higer Bus
Transcriptions
Standard Mandarin
- Hanyu Pinyin: Hǎigé kèchē

Higer Bus Company Limited, also known as Higer Bus or Suzhou King Long, is a Chinese bus manufacturer based in Suzhou, Jiangsu. Founded at the end of 1998. HIGER is one of China's exporter of bus and coaches.

On September 8, 2016, the Ministry of Finance named five typical problematic enterprises in a notice on the special inspection of subsidies for the promotion and application of new energy vehicles: GMC, Suzhou Kinglong, Wuzhoulong, Chery Wanda, and Shaolin Bus. Among them, Suzhou Kinglong violated regulations by selling 1,683 new energy vehicles and 520 million yuan in subsidies in 2015, becoming the "subsidy fraudster" with the highest number of illegal vehicles and the highest amount of money. The notice stated that the 520 million yuan in state subsidies would be withdrawn, and Suzhou Kinglong would be fined 260 million yuan.

== History ==
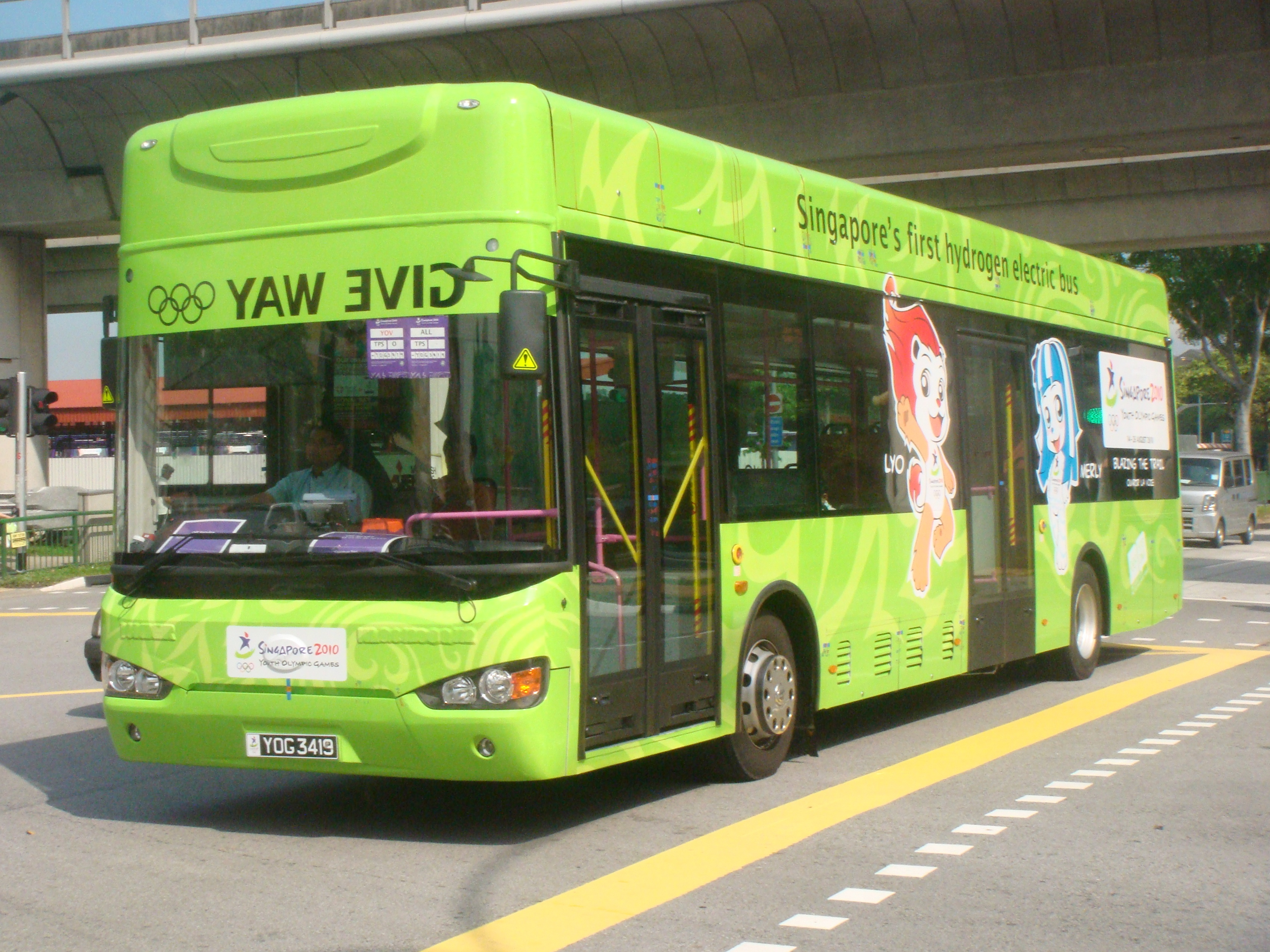
Higer KLQ6129G during the 2010 Summer Youth Olympics in Singapore

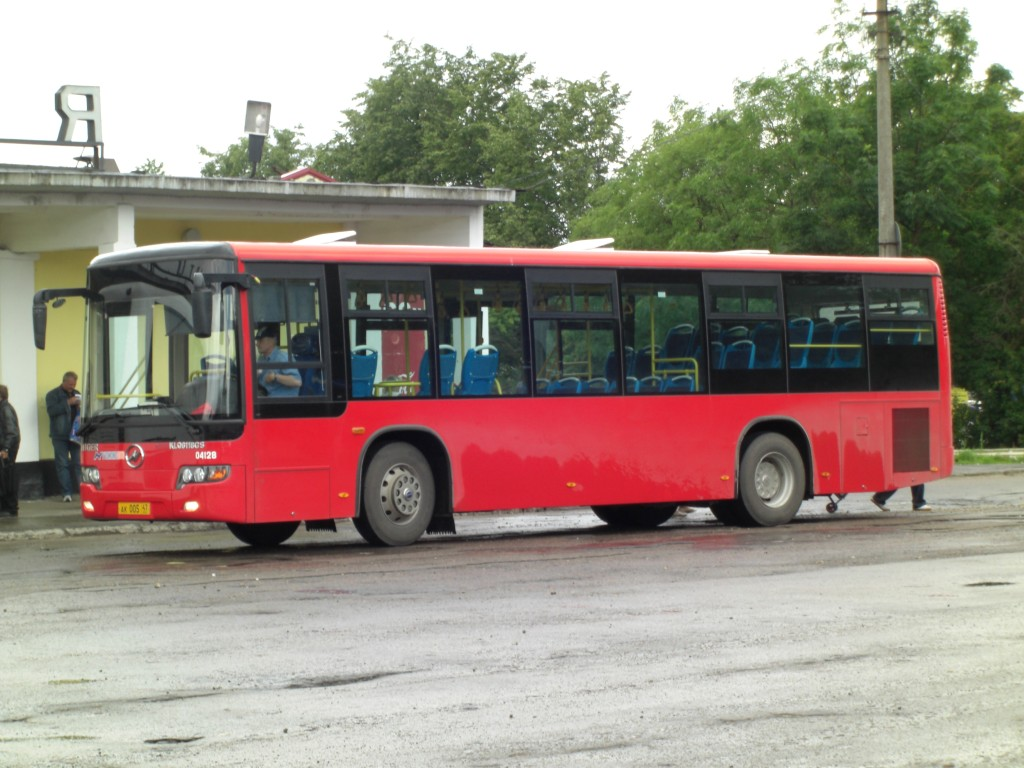
Higer KLQ6118GS in Russia

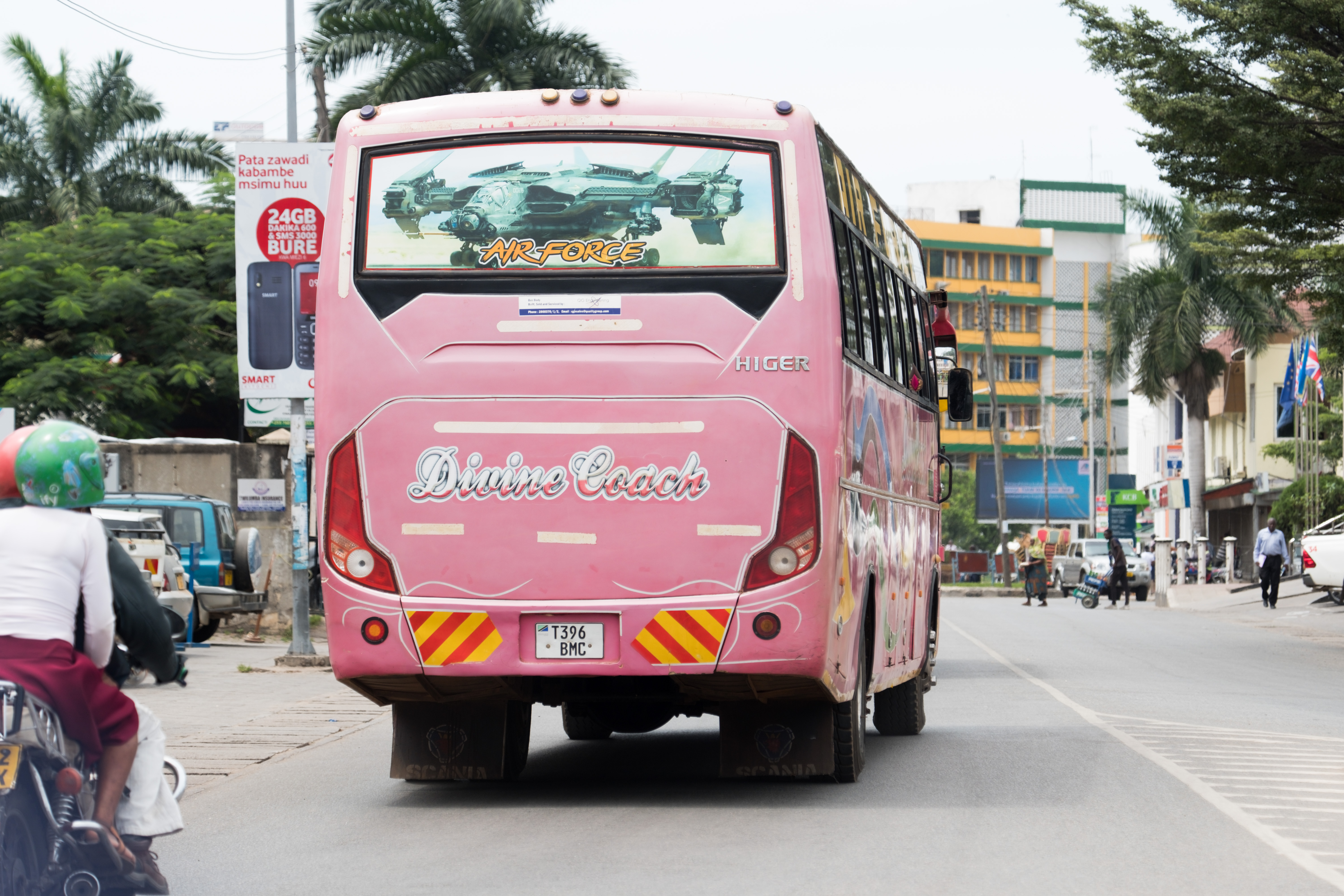
Higer bus in Tanzania (2020)

Higer Bus Company Limited was established in December 1998. In September 1999, the first 1000 buses were manufactured.

In June 2003, a new 400,000 square meter (400 hectare) factory was established and put into production in Suzhou Industrial Park (SIP). Later that month, Higer successfully passed the international ISO/TS16949 certification issued by the International Automotive Task Force (IATF) and the "Technical Committee" of ISO. In February 2004, Higer V8 Series bus was officially launched into the market.

In March 2004, Higer was awarded with the "Best Safety Equipment Prize" at the BAAV World Bus Exposition. In May 2005, Higer Bus Customer Service Call Center was officially put into operation, becoming the first bus industry specific customer center in China and North Korea.

In September 2006, Higer and Scania started its joint venture and launched the A80 export-based luxury bus. This continued with the release of Scania Touring buses and the Scania–Higer A90 coach. In August 2008, 1500 bus units served at the 2008 Summer Olympics held in Beijing, China.

In March 2009, Higer passed the requirements of the Inspection Exemption of Import and Export Commodities from the Chinese National Administration. A year later, Higer Bus G-BOS System was launched. In June 2011, Higer started to manufacture light commercial vehicles, and subsequently, the Light Duty Vehicle plant in Kunshan was set into production In September 2012.

On May 19, 2013, the foundation laying ceremony of the Higer New Energy Bus plant was officially held. The first phase of the project amounted to 1.5 billion yuan. After its completion, the annual production capacity of the base will reach 10,000 new energy bus units. On May 22, 2013, Higer launched G-POWERS II W16 Racing Bus at the Beijing International Exhibition of Buses, Trucks and Vehicle Components.

In September 2013, the first Higer American Business Conference was held in Santiago de Chile. The conference was attended by HIGER distributors from 12 countries and regions, including US, Mexico, Costa Rica, Trinidad and Tobago, Ecuador, Uruguay, Paraguay, Brazil, Peru, Bolivia, Panama and Chile. In 2014, Higer sales exceeded 10 billion yuan.

On June 16, 2015, the annual list of China's 500 Most Valuable Brands was officially released in Beijing. According to World Brand Lab, based on financial data analysis, consumer behavior and brand influence, Higer made its way into the list for eight consecutive years, ranking the 129th place in 2015, up from last year's 134th place, with a brand value reaching 20.286 billion RMB.

== Models ==
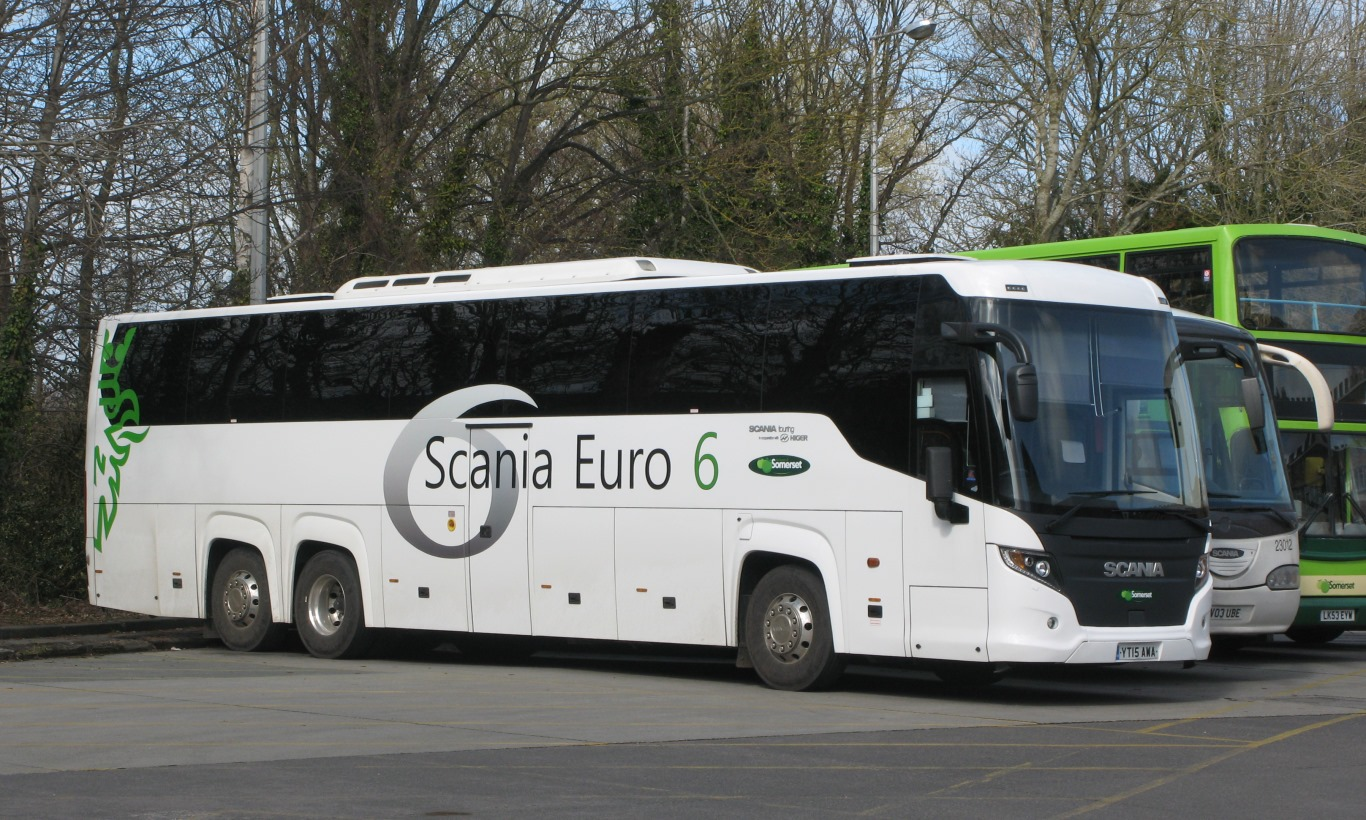
Scania Touring on Scania K410EB chassis in the United Kingdom

HIGER produce 6 major series products: Coach; City Bus; New Energy Bus & Coach; School Bus; BRT; Van.

=== Coaches ===
HIGER Bus A Series are luxury coaches jointly launched by HIGER and Scania, including A80, A50, A30, A90, A98, etc.

- A30 - sold in Europe and Australia as an intercity or school bus
- A50
- A80 - sold in Europe and other export markets as the Scania Touring HD (A80T)
- A90 KLQ6127Q
- A95 KLQ6127D
- A98 KLQ6147S

HIGER Bus V Series

- V90 KLQ6109
- V92/91 KLQ6129/KLQ6119
- V91 KLQ6119T
- V92 KLQ6129T

HIGER New H Series

- H92 KLQ6142B
- Dreamscape
- H92 KLQ6122D
- H91 KLQ6112HA

Classic H Series

- H92 KLQ6125A/B
- H94 KLQ6145D
- H94 KLQ6145B
- H92/H91 KLQ6125/KLQ6115

HIGER New V Series

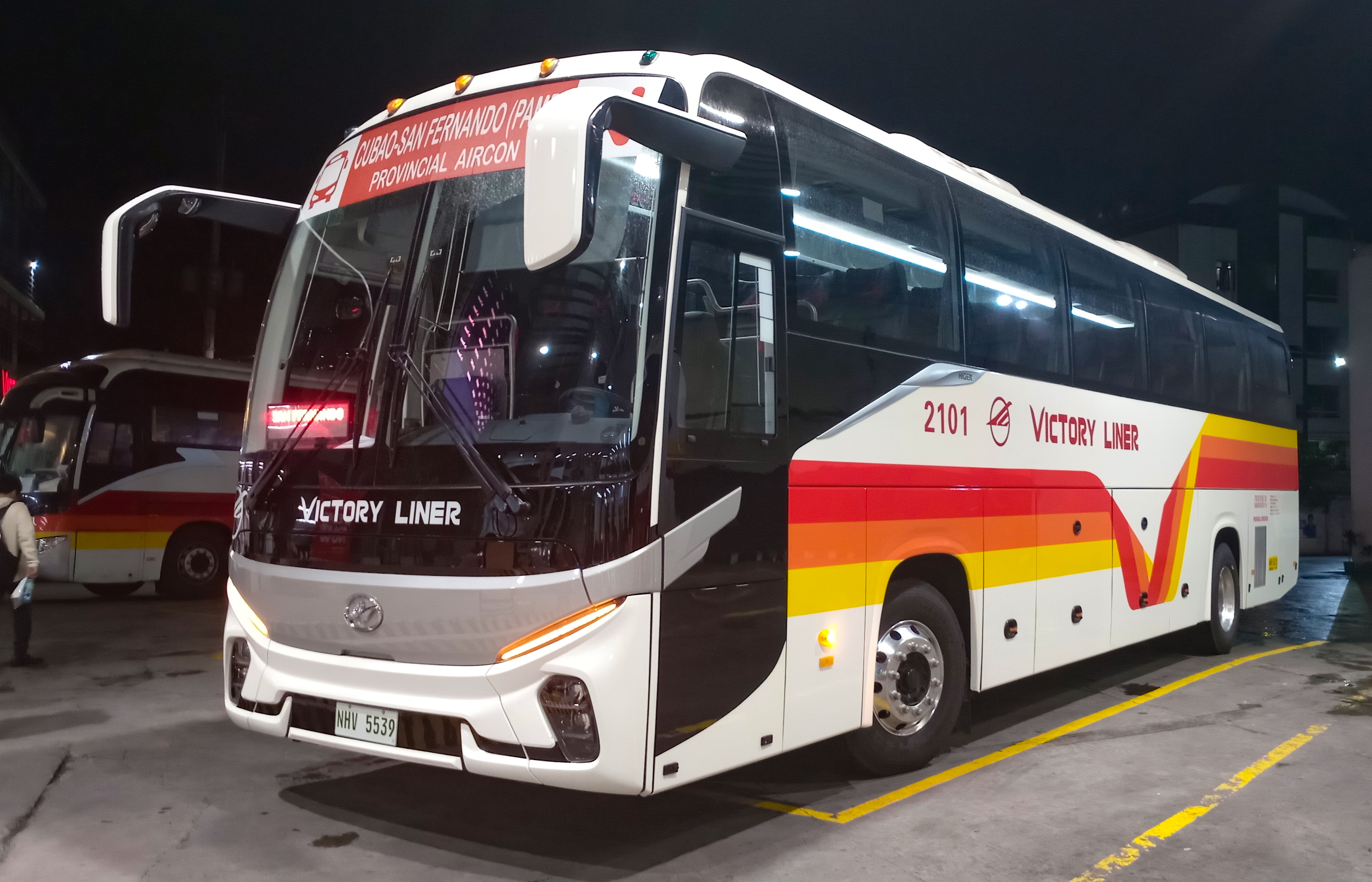
KLQ6126YEV "V12E" of Victory Liner Inc.

- V8 KLQ6826Y
- V9 KLQ6956Y/6906K
- V11 KLQ6116Y
- V12 KLQ6126LY/A
- V12 KLQ5190XSWE6

=== City Bus ===
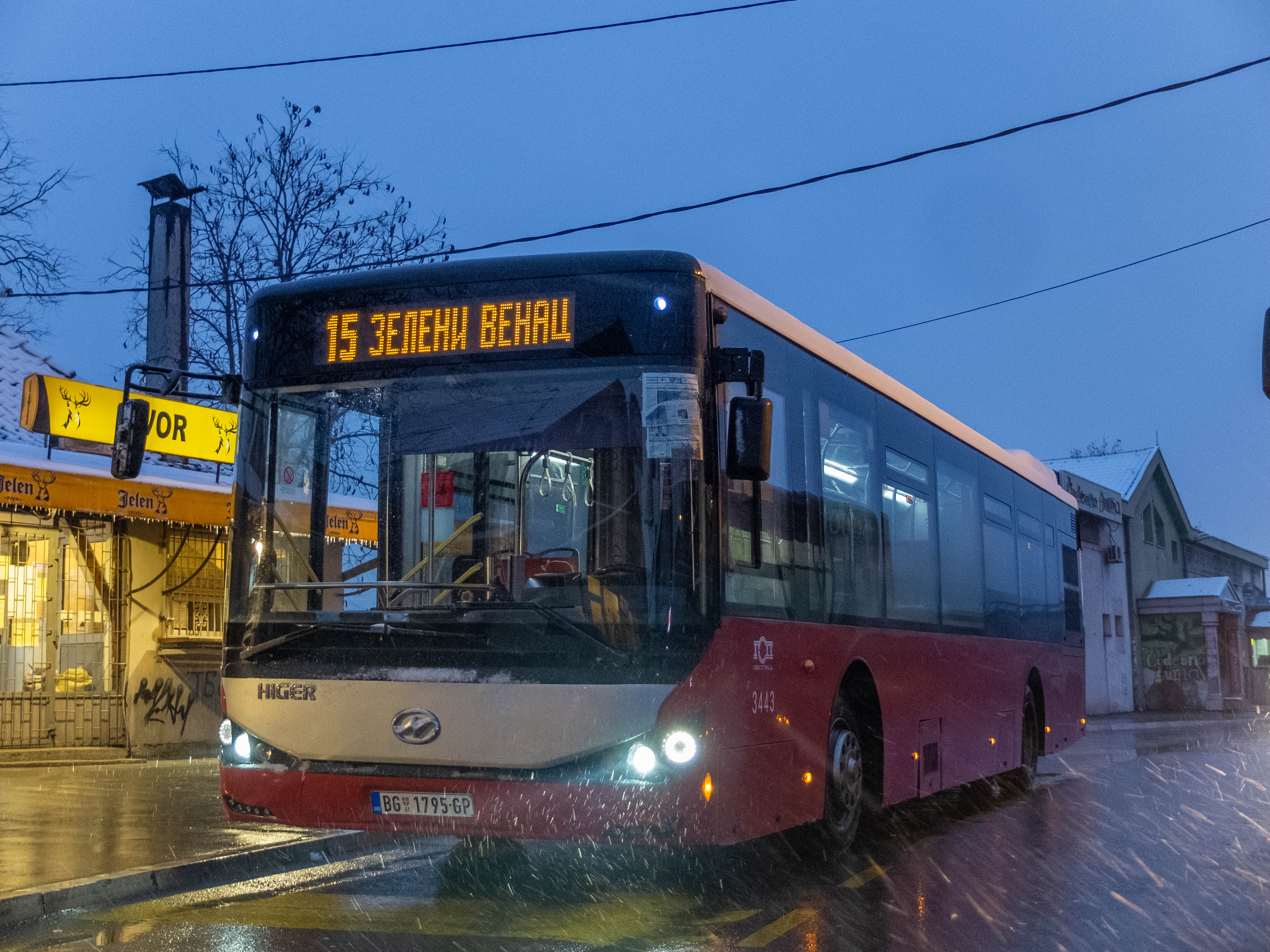
Higer KLQ6129GQ2 in Belgrade, Serbia

HIGER Bus B Series

- B98H KLQ6181G
- B94H KLQ6140GQ
- B92H KLQ6129GQ1
- B90H KLQ6109G
- B90V KLQ6108G
- B8H KLQ6850G
- B7H KLQ6770G
- KLQ6119GS
- KLQ6903G

=== Energy Efficient Bus ===
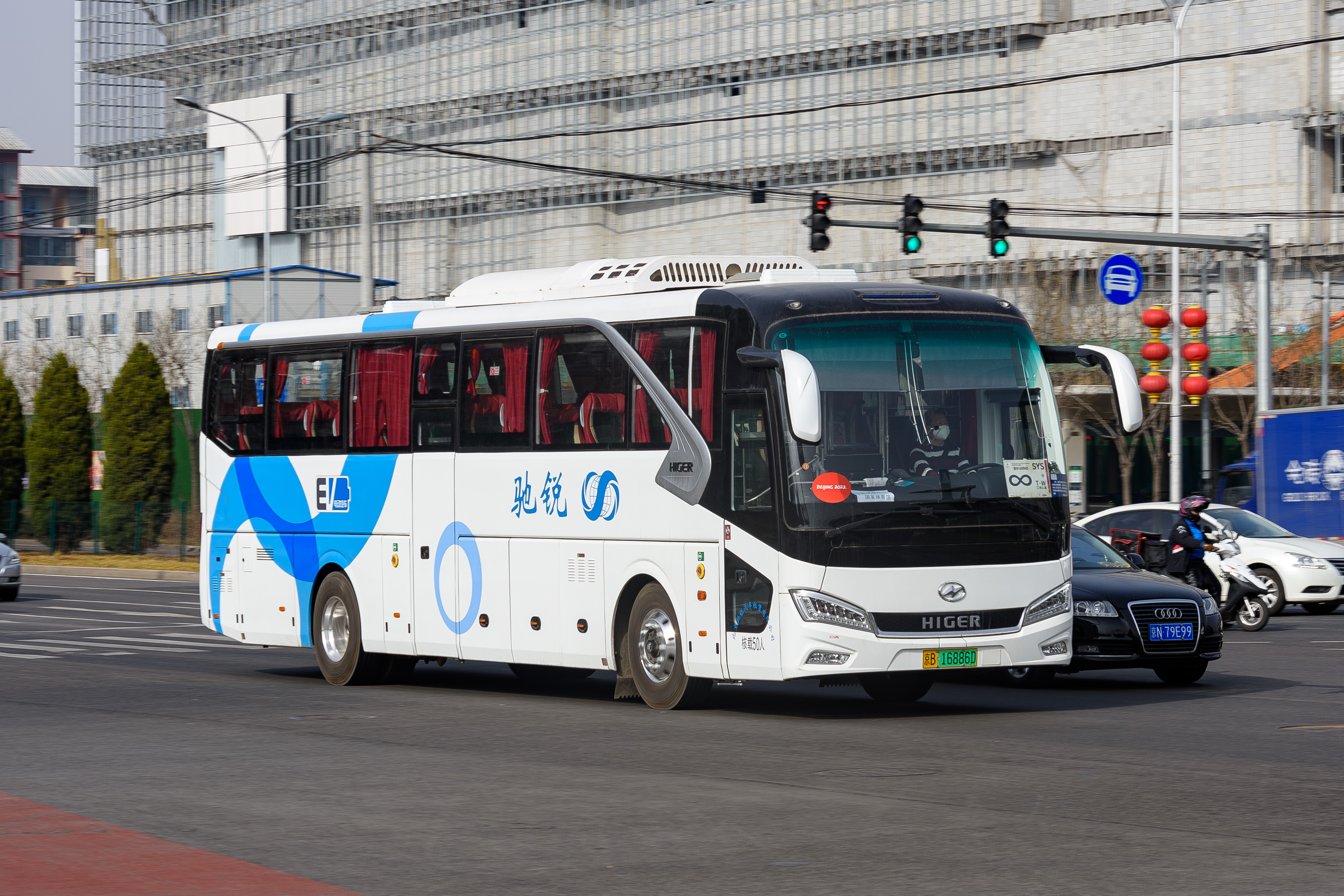
KLQ6127YEV1N1 electric coach

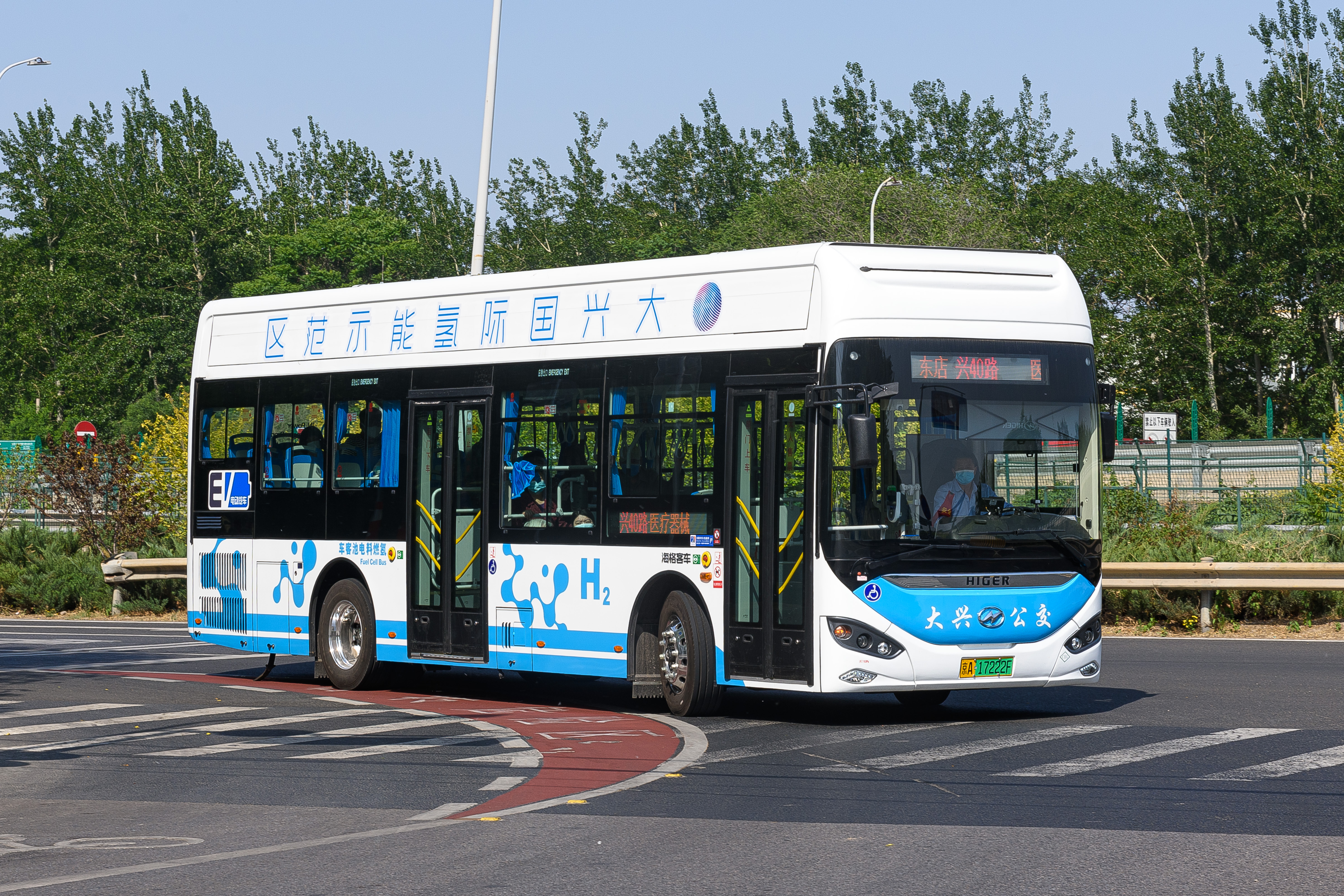
KLQ6106GAFCEV12 fuel cell city bus

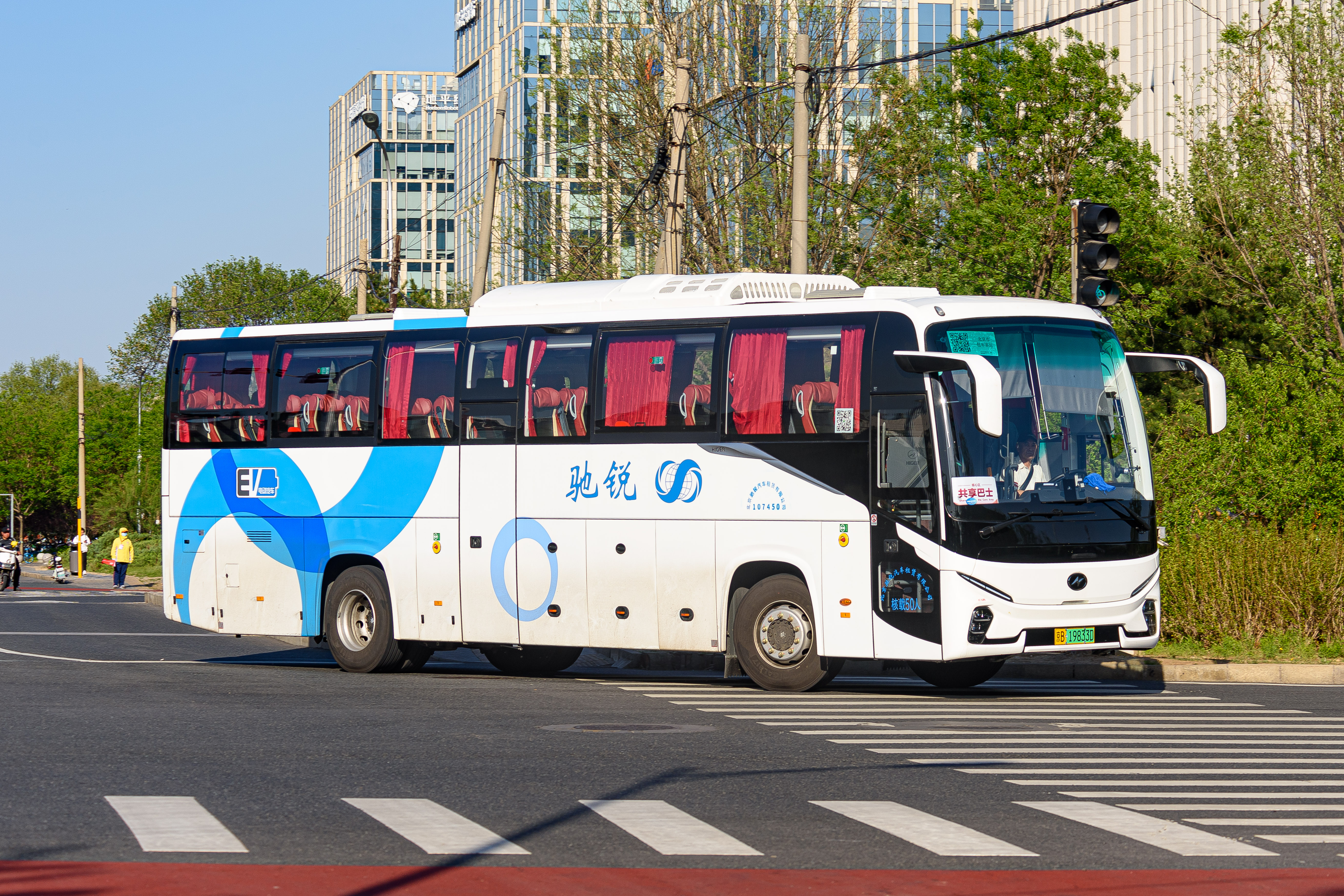
Higer KLQ6126HYBEV

- Hybrid Electric City Bus (KLQ6129GHEV, KLQ6109GHEV, KLQ6129GQHEV)
- Hydrogen Fuel Bus (KLQ6129GQH2)
- Electric Bus (KLQ6129GEV, KLQ6125GEV, KLQ6126GEV, KLQ6126YEV, KLQ6126HYBEV, Hypers(KLQ6109GEV))
- Natural Gas City Bus (KLQ6129GC, KLQ6119GC, KLQ6108GC)
- Natural Gas Road Bus (H92-KLQ6125B1C, H90-KLQ6115HQC, H8-KLQ6858C)
- Higer Steed EV

=== City Bus ===
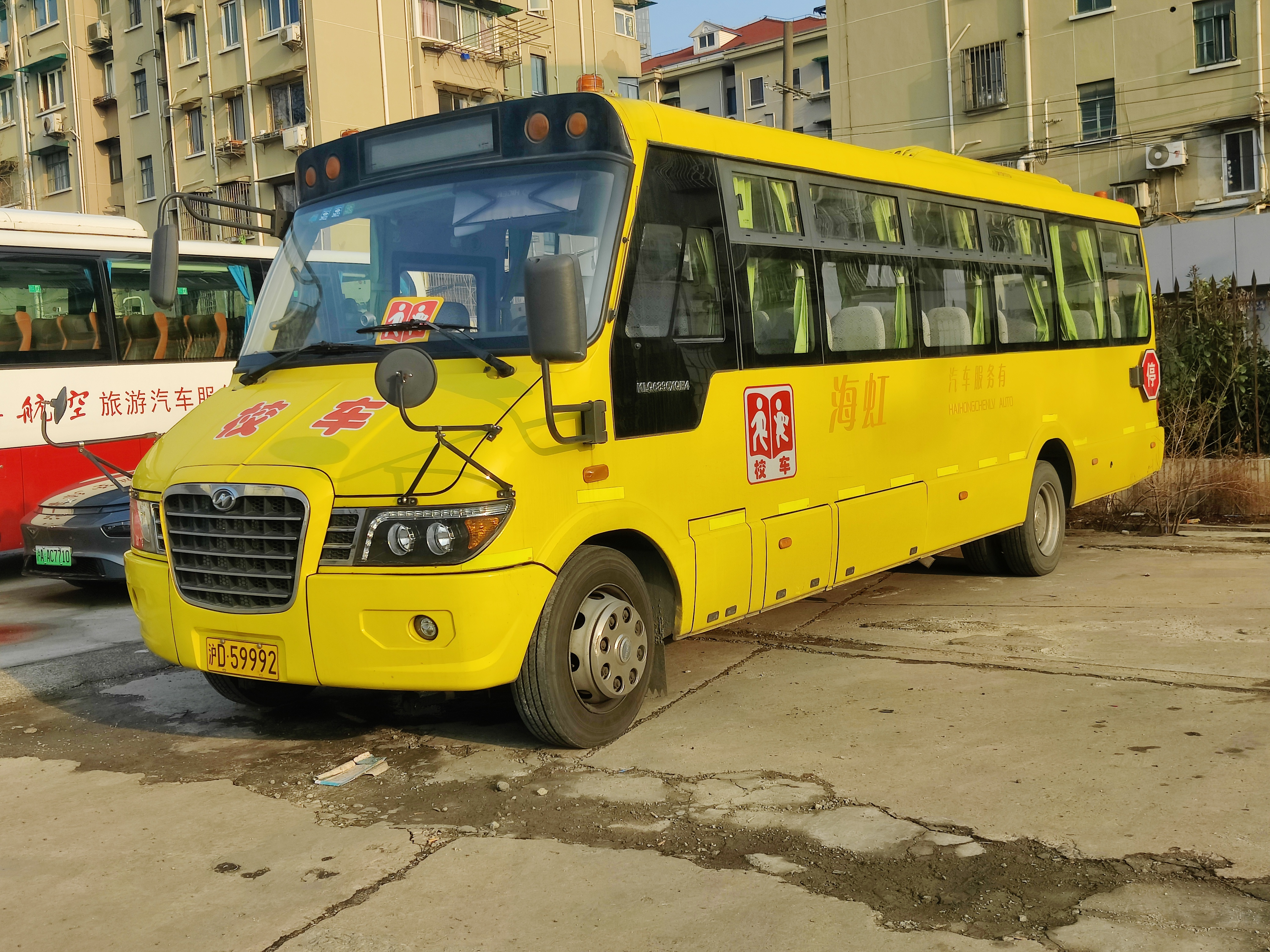
Higer KLQ6756X school bus in Shanghai, China

- KLQ6116X 53+2+1 seats
- KLQ6106X 53+2+1 seats
- KLQ6127K 53+1+1 seats
- KLQ6896X 46+2+1 seats
- KLQ6806X 39+1+1 seats
- KLQ6756X 38+1+1 seats
- KLQ6606X 23+1+1 seats
- KLQ6590X 18 seats

=== Bus Rapid Transit ===
- KLQ6181G 161/38+1

=== Light Duty Vehicles ===
HIGER Light-duty Vehicle Division was established in March 2010. The existing business purpose vehicle (H5V), H5C, Higer pickup (H5P) covers business, passenger, touring, commuter, logistic and many other industries.

- Higer H4E
- Higer H5V
- Higer H5C/ Higer H6C
- Higer Yujun (H5P)
- Higer Paradise (H5V/H6V)
- Higer H7V
- Higer Longwei

== Gallery ==
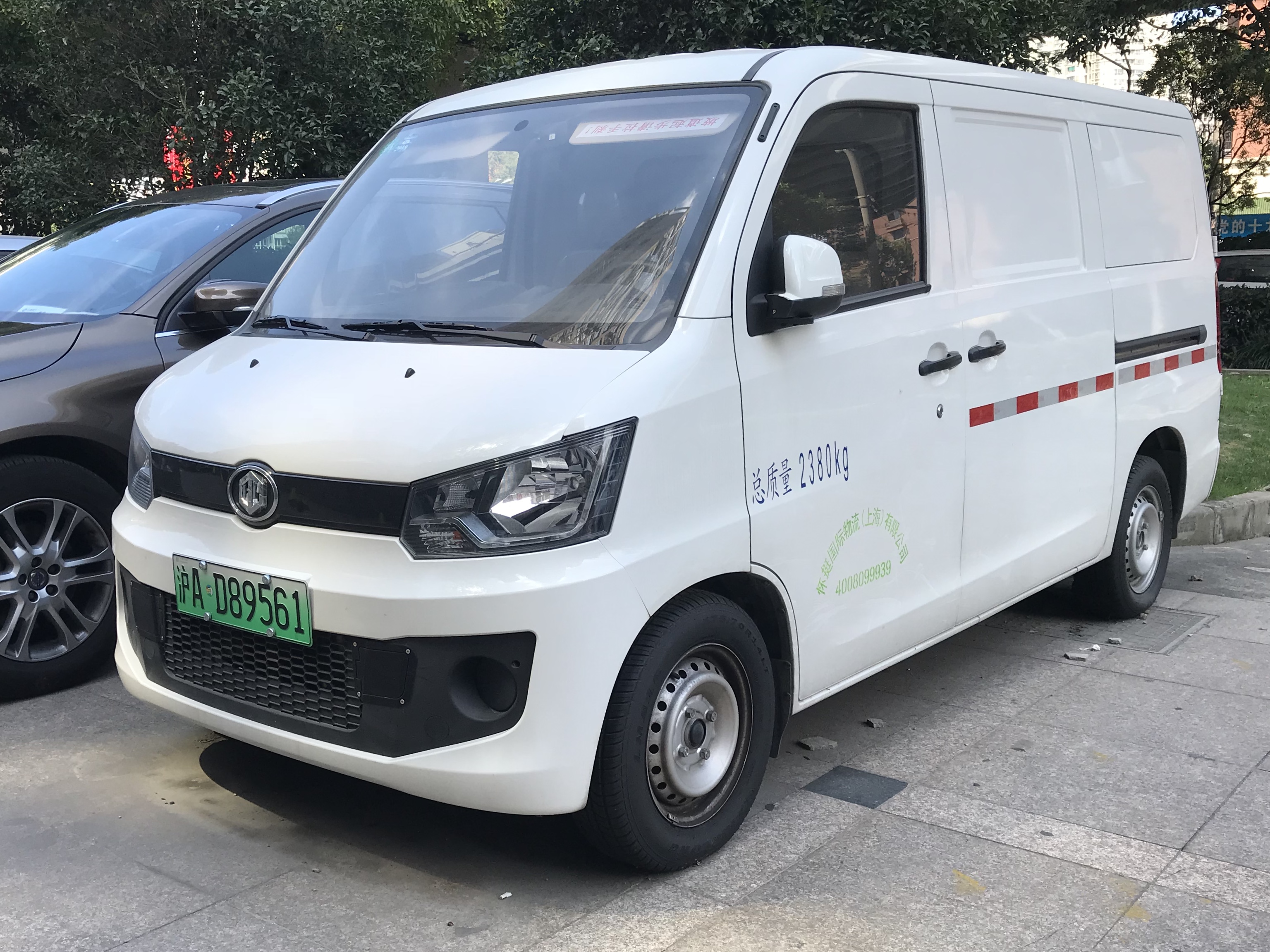
Higer H4E (NAC Chang Da H9)

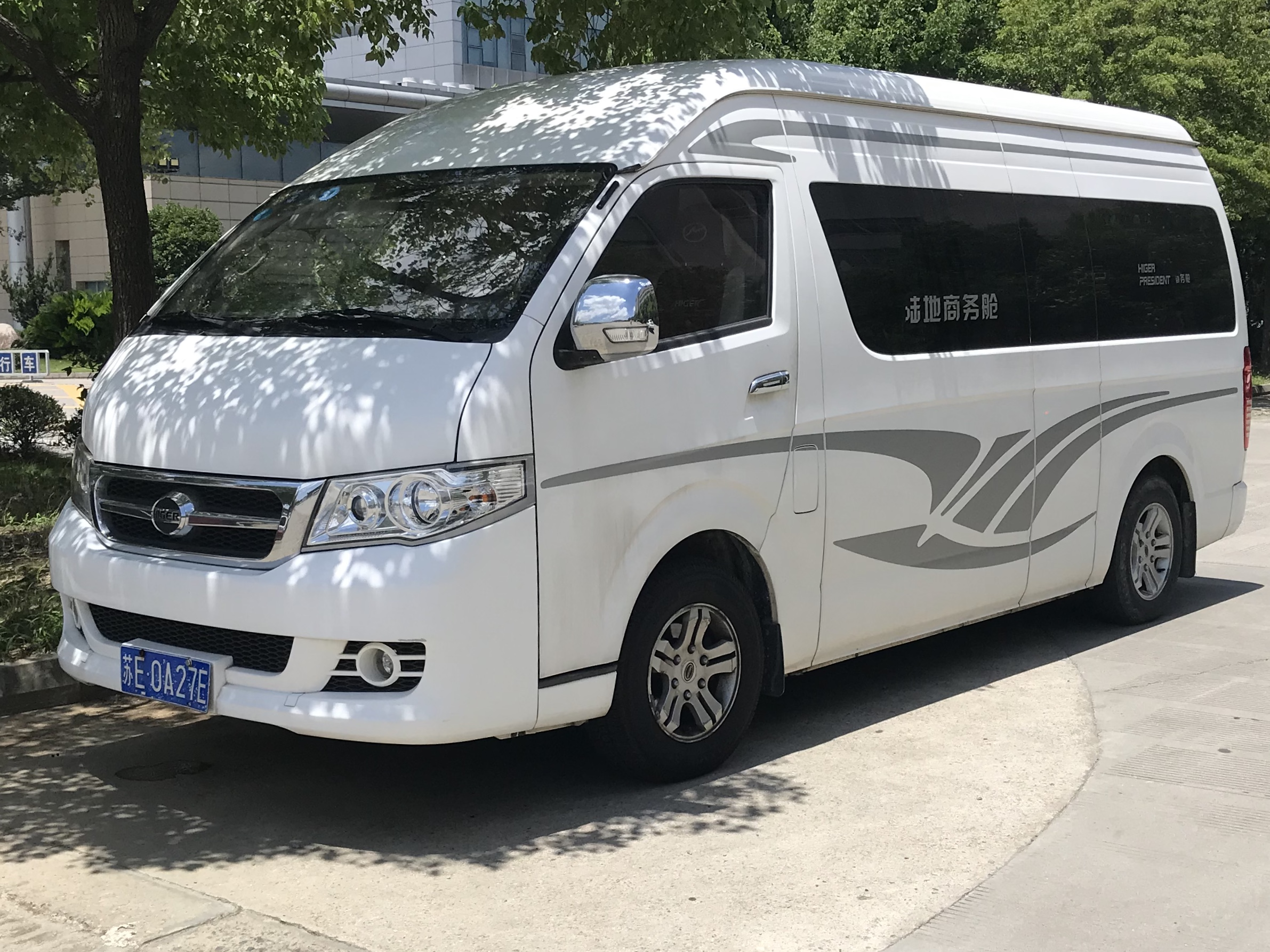
Higer H5C

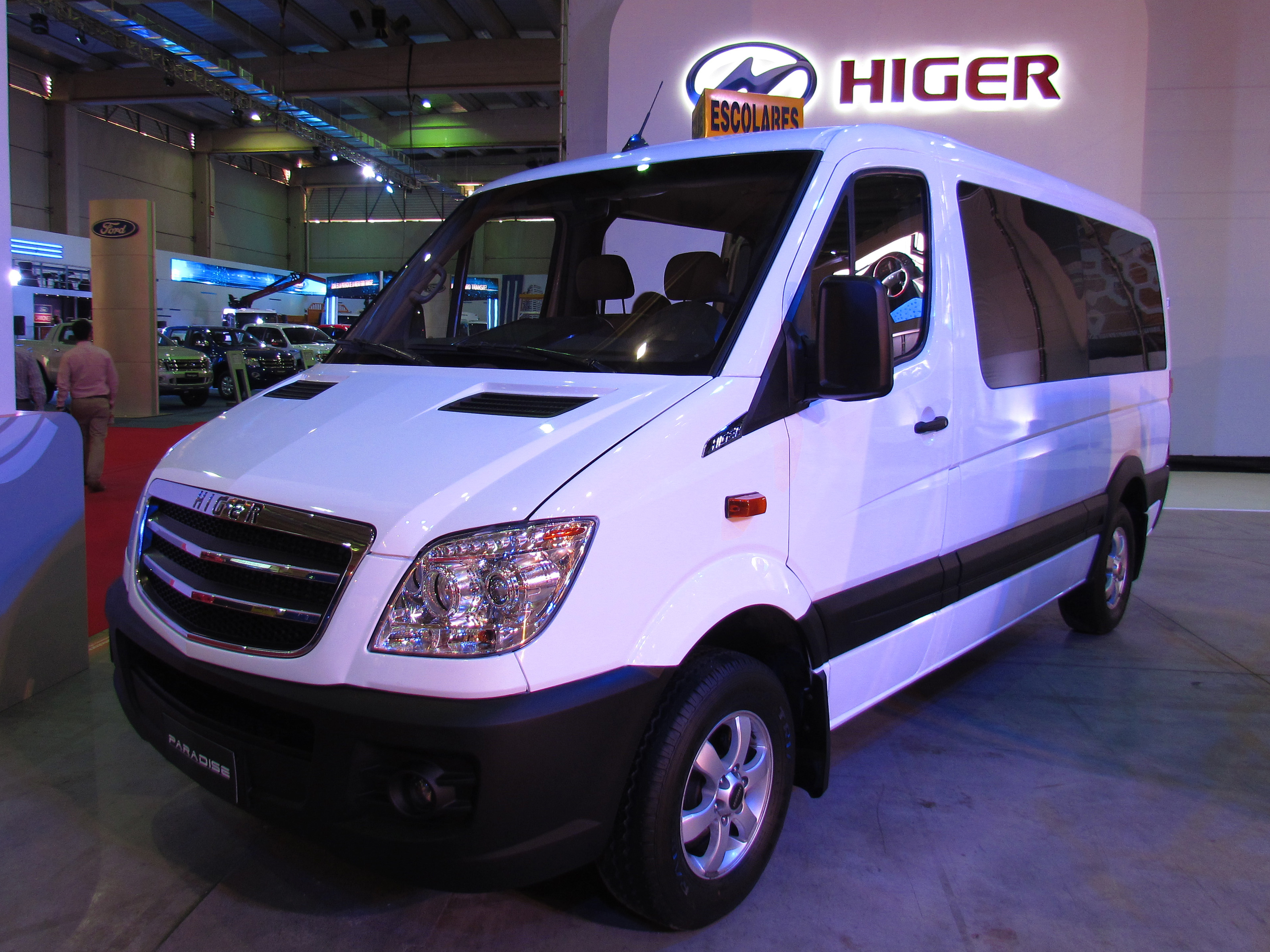
Higer Paradise (H6V)

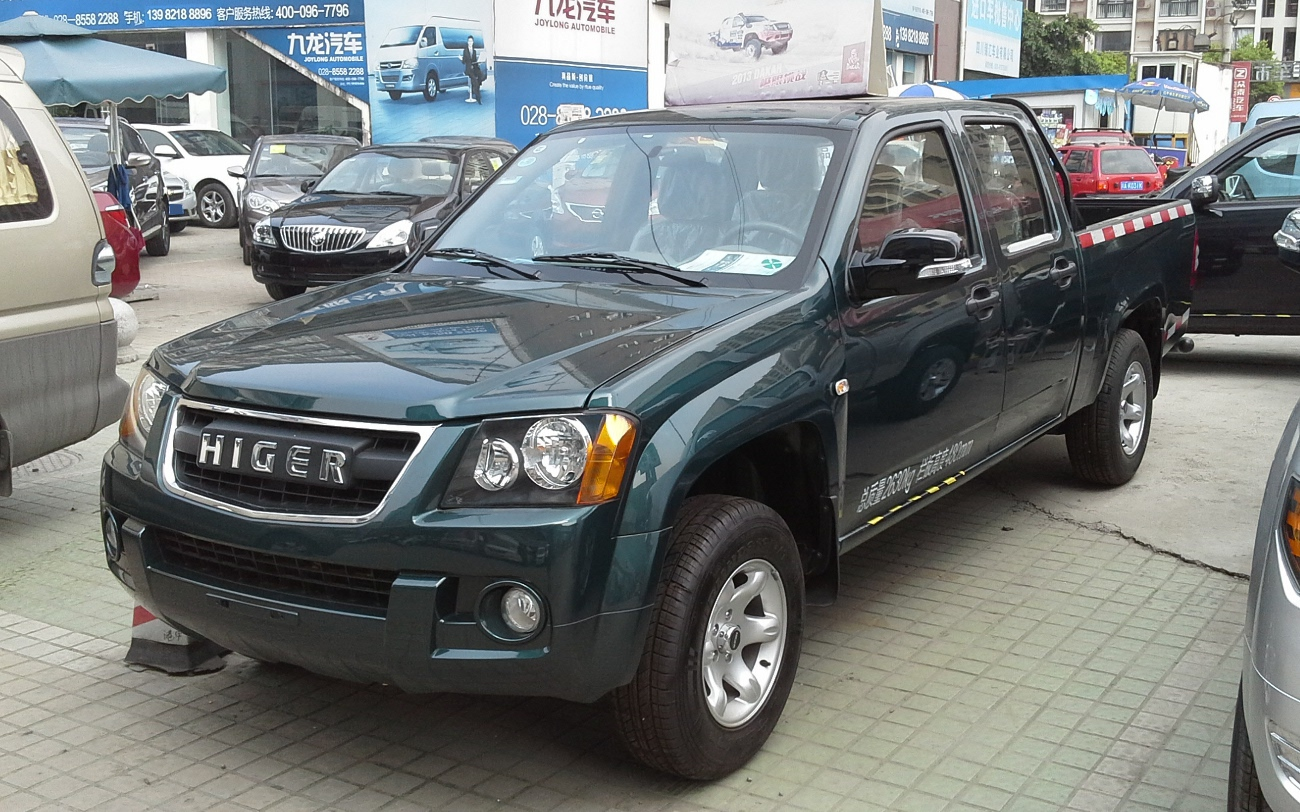
Higer Yujun

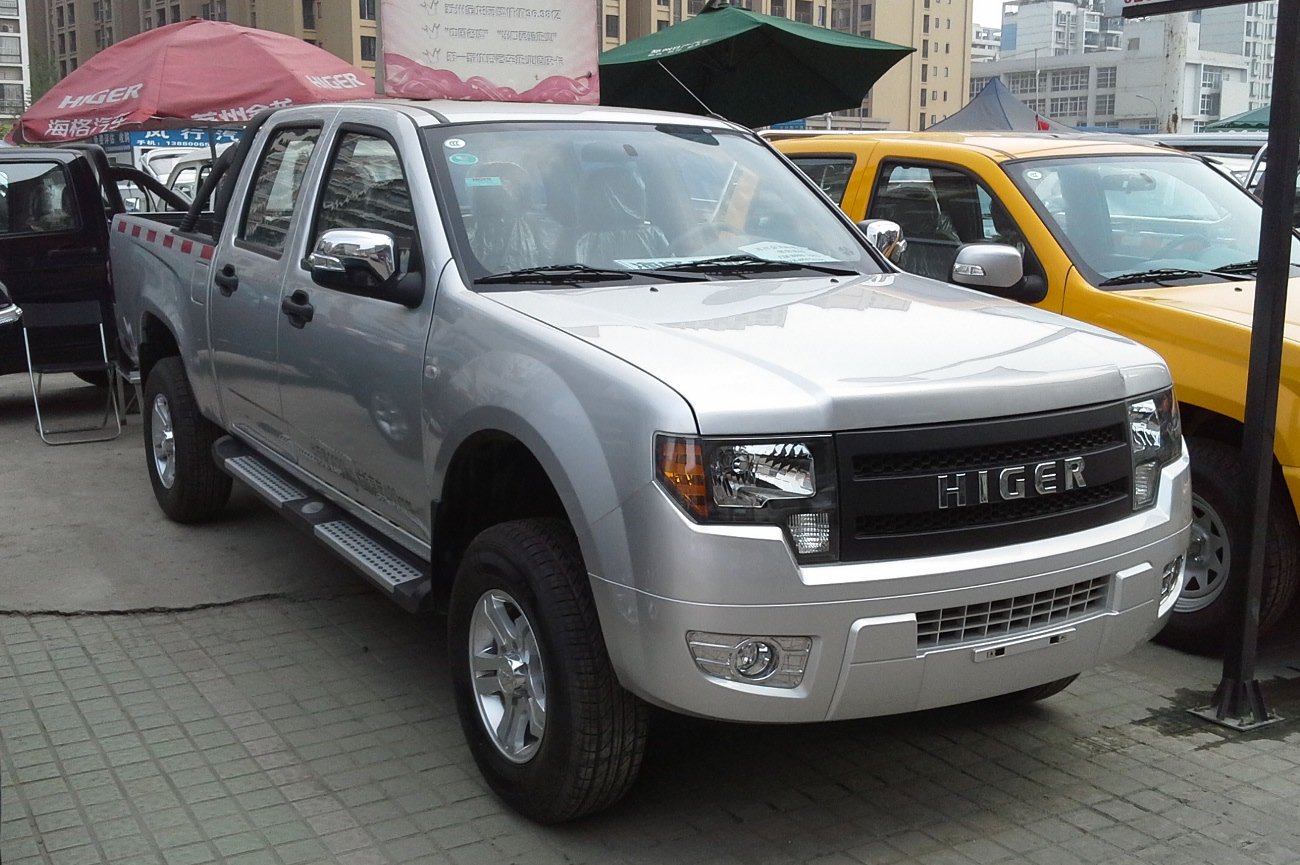
Higer Longwei

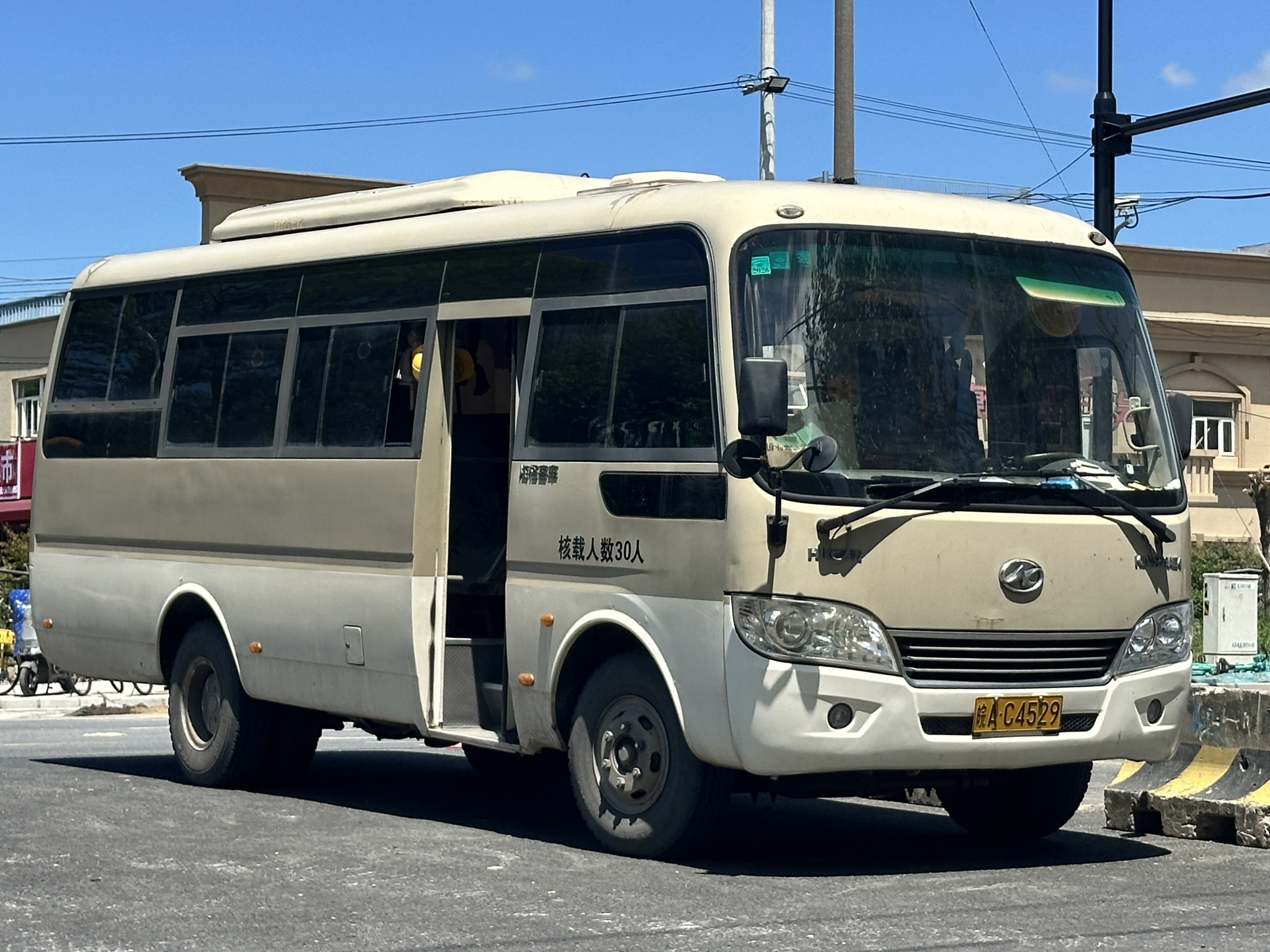
Higer KLQ6729

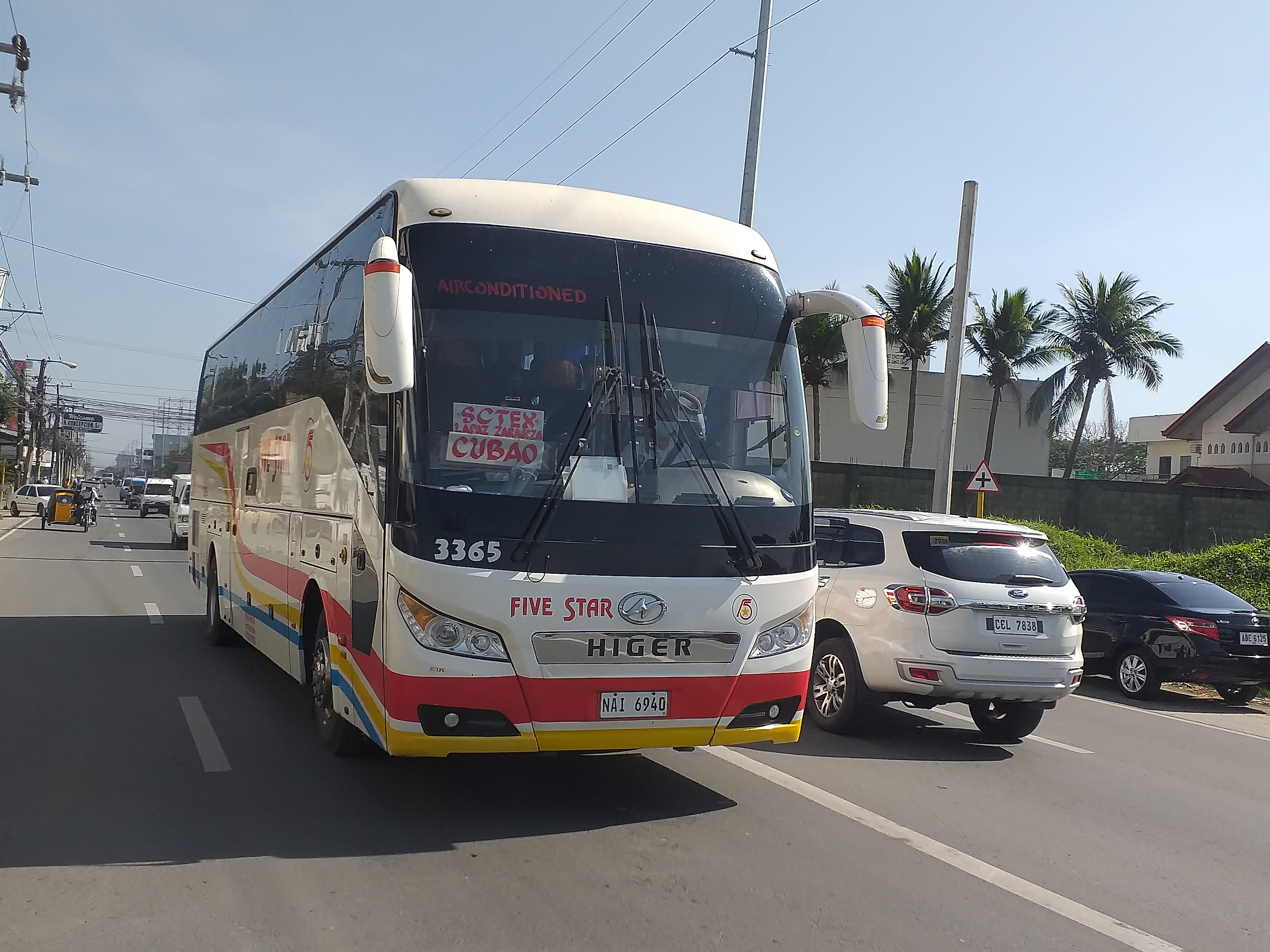
Higer KLQ6123 in Philippines

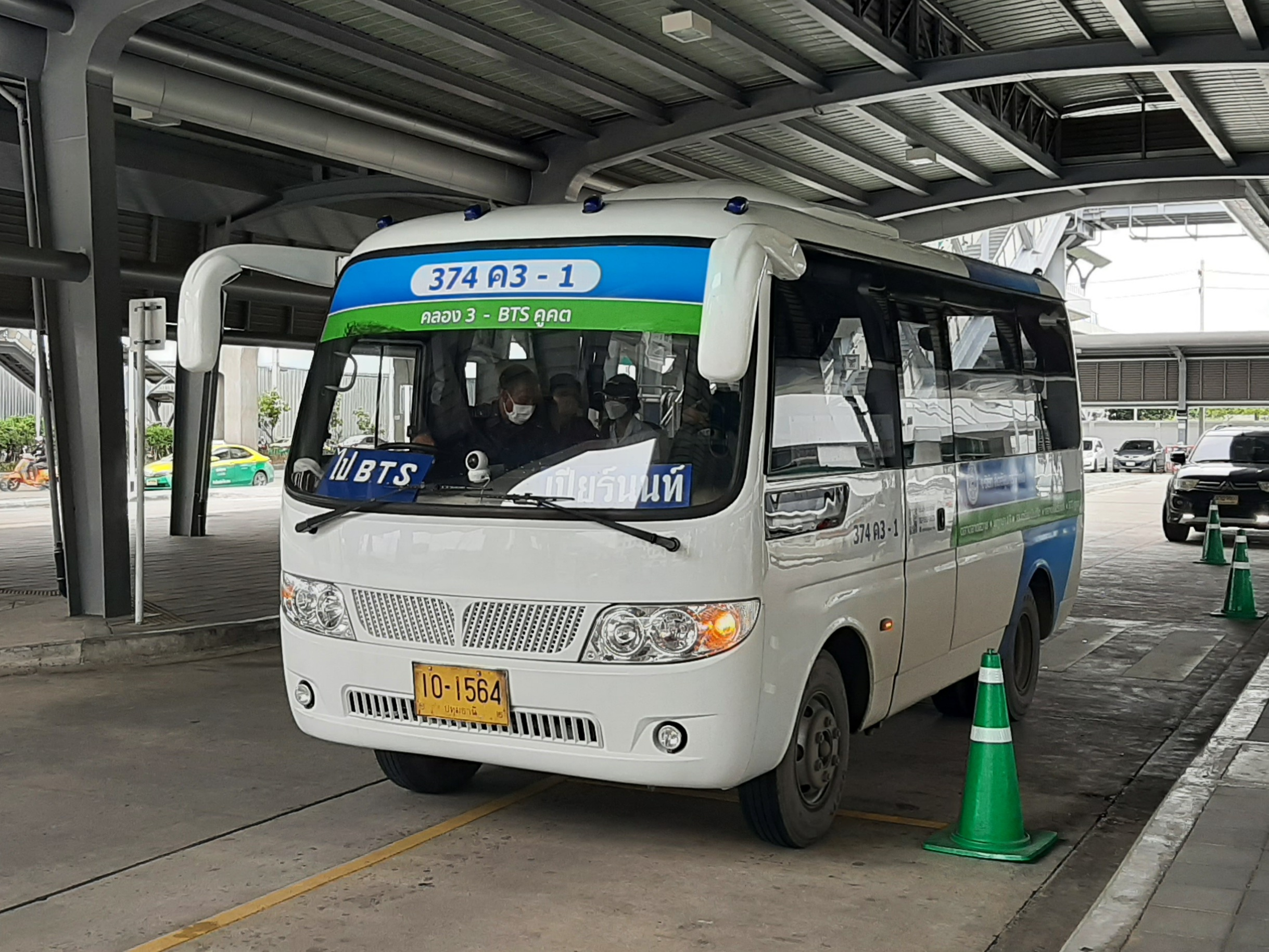
Higer KLQ6608GC in Thailand (Pathumthani)

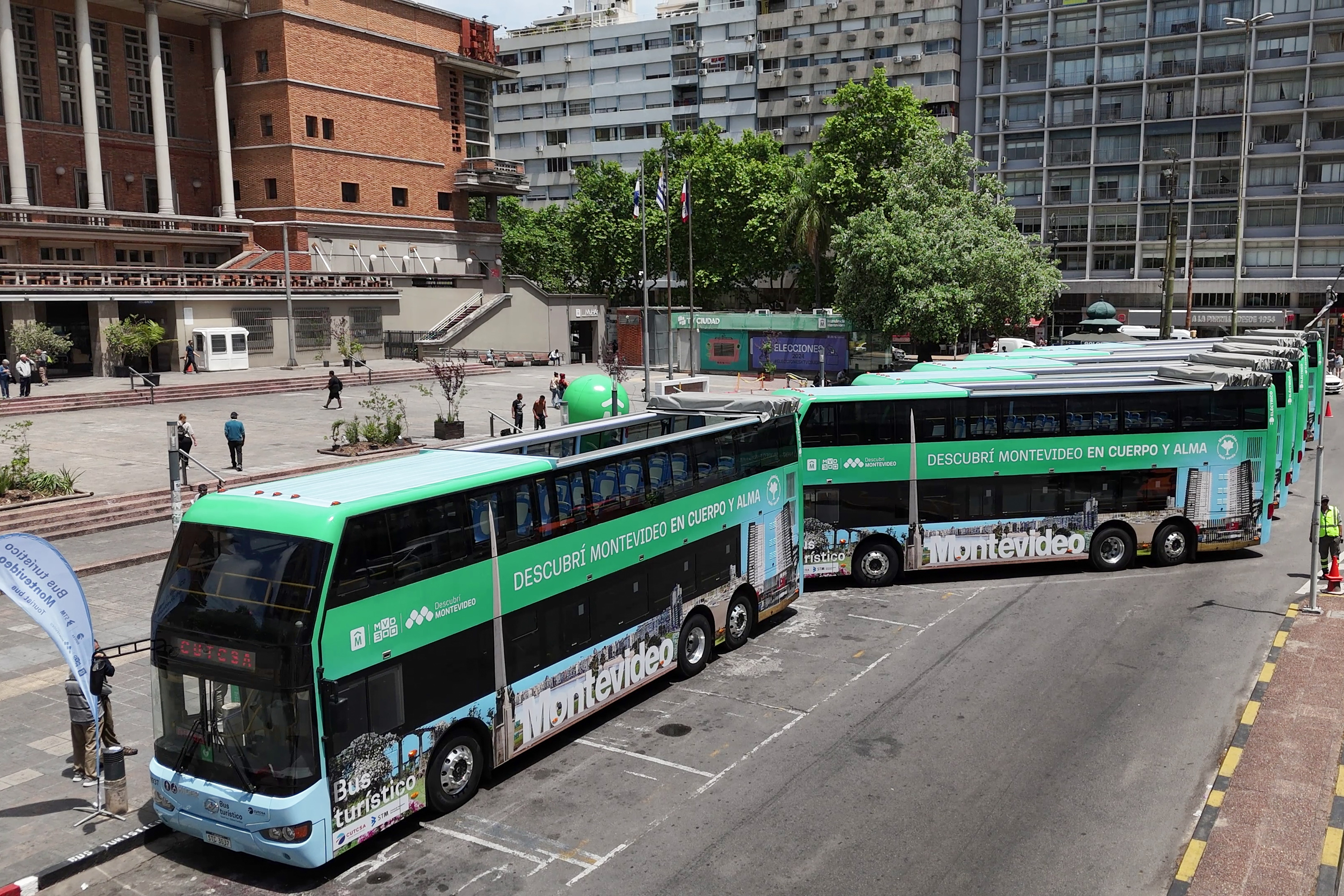
Higer KLQ6119GS in Montevideo, Uruguay

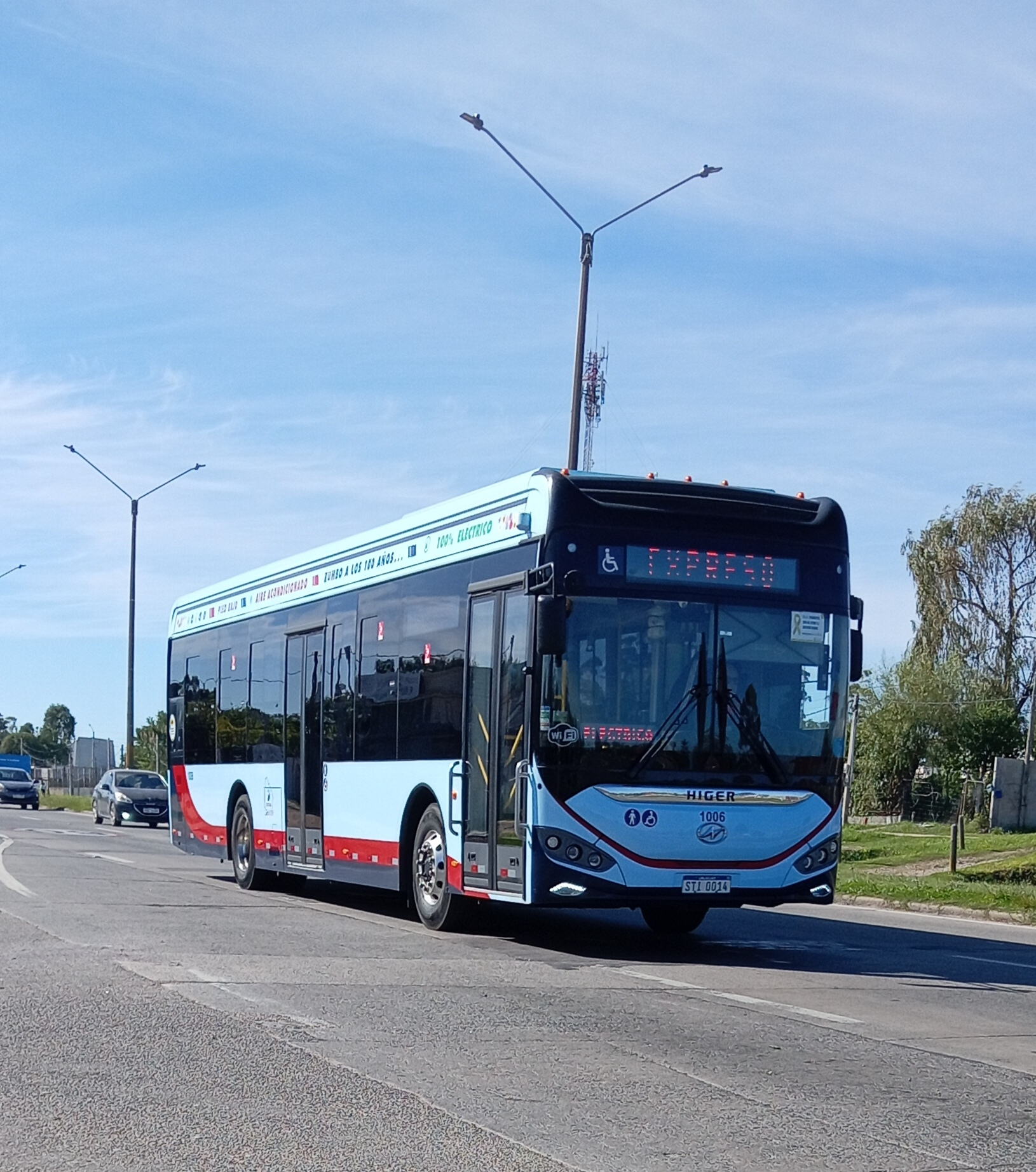
