= Higer H5C =

Higer H5C/H5F/H6C
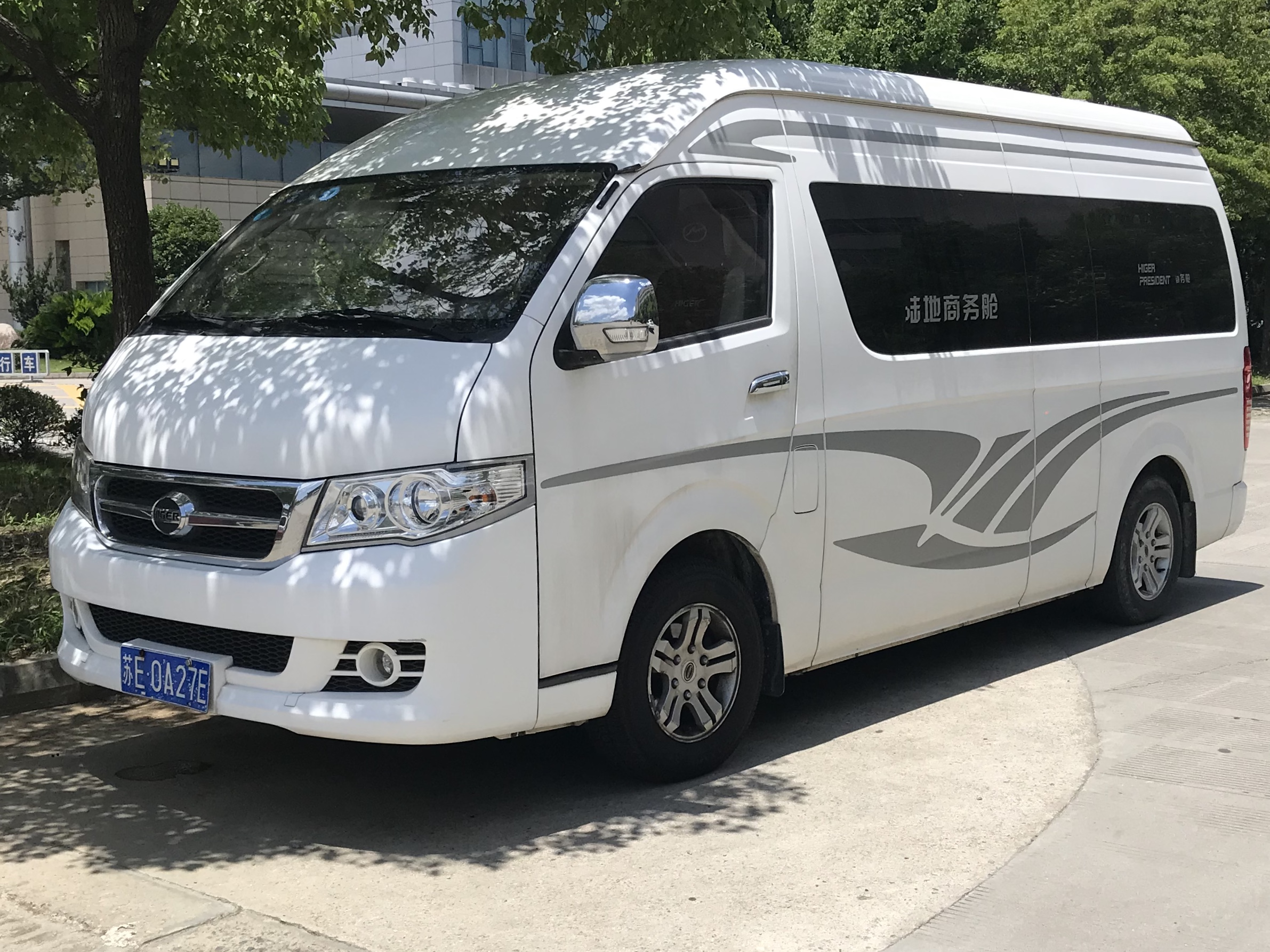

Overview
- Also called: Higer H5F; Higer H6C; King Long Kaige
- Production: August 2004 – present
- Assembly: China: Suzhou, Jiangsu

Body and chassis
- Body style: 3-door van/minibus; 4-door van/minibus
- Layout: Front-engine, rear-wheel-drive

Powertrain
- Engine: 2.4 L 4RB2 I4 DOHC; 2.4 L 4G69S4N I4 SOHC; 2.5 L DK4B1 Turbo Diesel engine; 2.7 L G4BA I4
- Transmission: 5-speed manual

Dimensions
- Wheelbase: 3,110 mm (122.4 in)
- Length: 5,380 mm (211.8 in)
- Width: 1,880 mm (74.0 in)
- Height: 2,285 mm (90.0 in)
- Curb weight: 2,120 kg (4,674 lb)

The Higer H5C, Higer H5F, and Higer H6C is a light commercial van produced by the Chinese automobile manufacturer Higer. First launched in 2004, the Higer H5C, H5F and H6C has since been available in a wide range of body configurations, including a minivan/MPV, minibus, and panel van.

== Overview ==
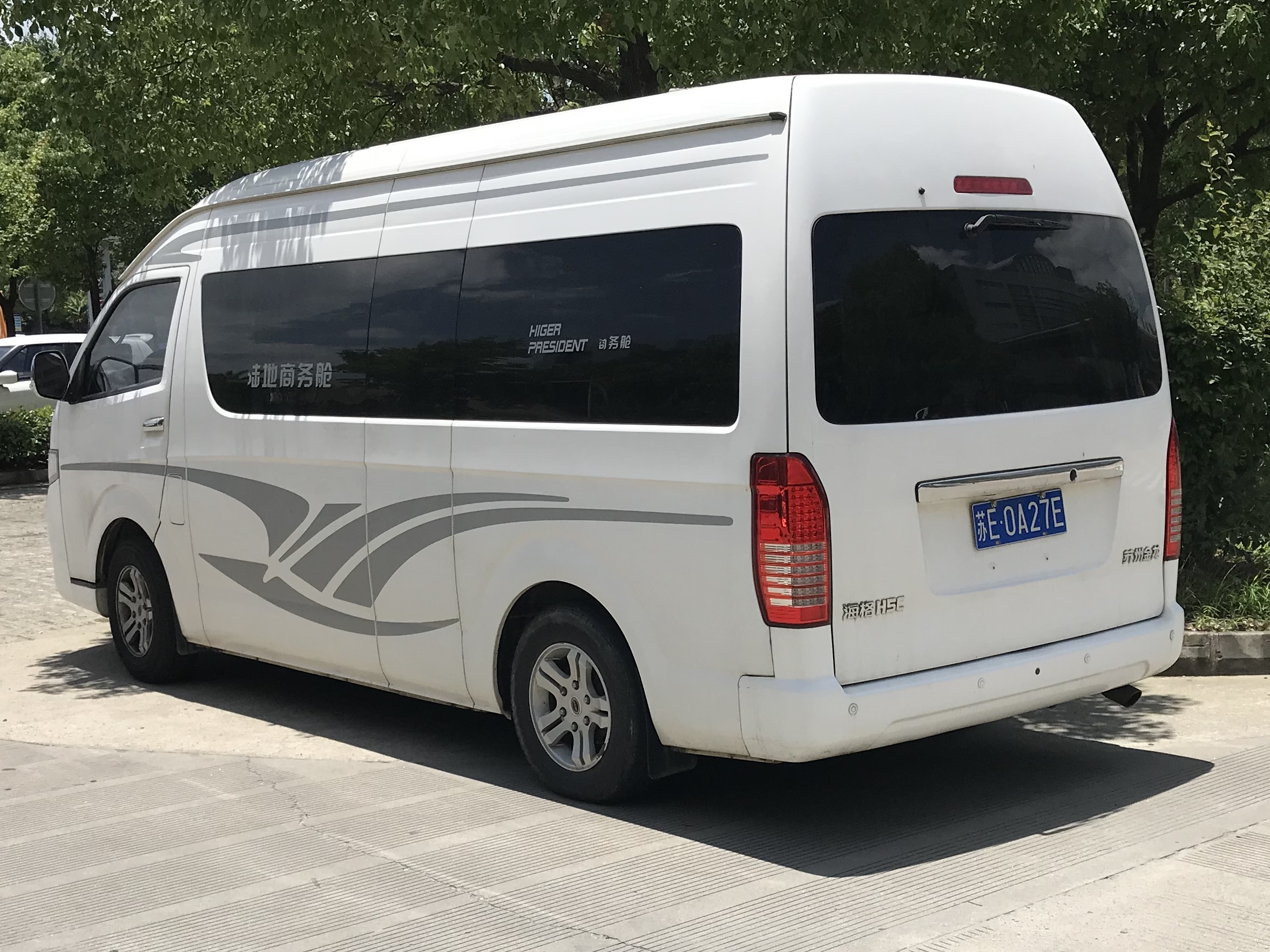
Higer H5C rear

Higer H5C engine options include both gasoline and diesel engines. The gasoline engine options of the H5C can be equipped with engine sizes of 2.4L and 2.7L. Its diesel engine options of the H5C is a 2.5L engine option.

The suspension setup of the Higer H5C is double wishbone independent suspension for the front and variable rate leaf spring for the rear.

Prices of the Higer H5C ranges from 16,530 yuan to 24,680 yuan.

== Design controversies ==
The exterior styling and dimensions of the Higer H5C is controversial as the exterior design of the H5C heavily resembles the fifth generation Toyota HiAce. Despite the licensing and cooperation between Toyota and multiple Chinese auto manufacturers on producing licensed and rebadged HiAce vans, Higer has never worked with Toyota for the development and production of the H5C, making the Higer H5C an unlicensed copy of the Toyota van.
