= Higer Paradise =

Chinese light commercial vehicle

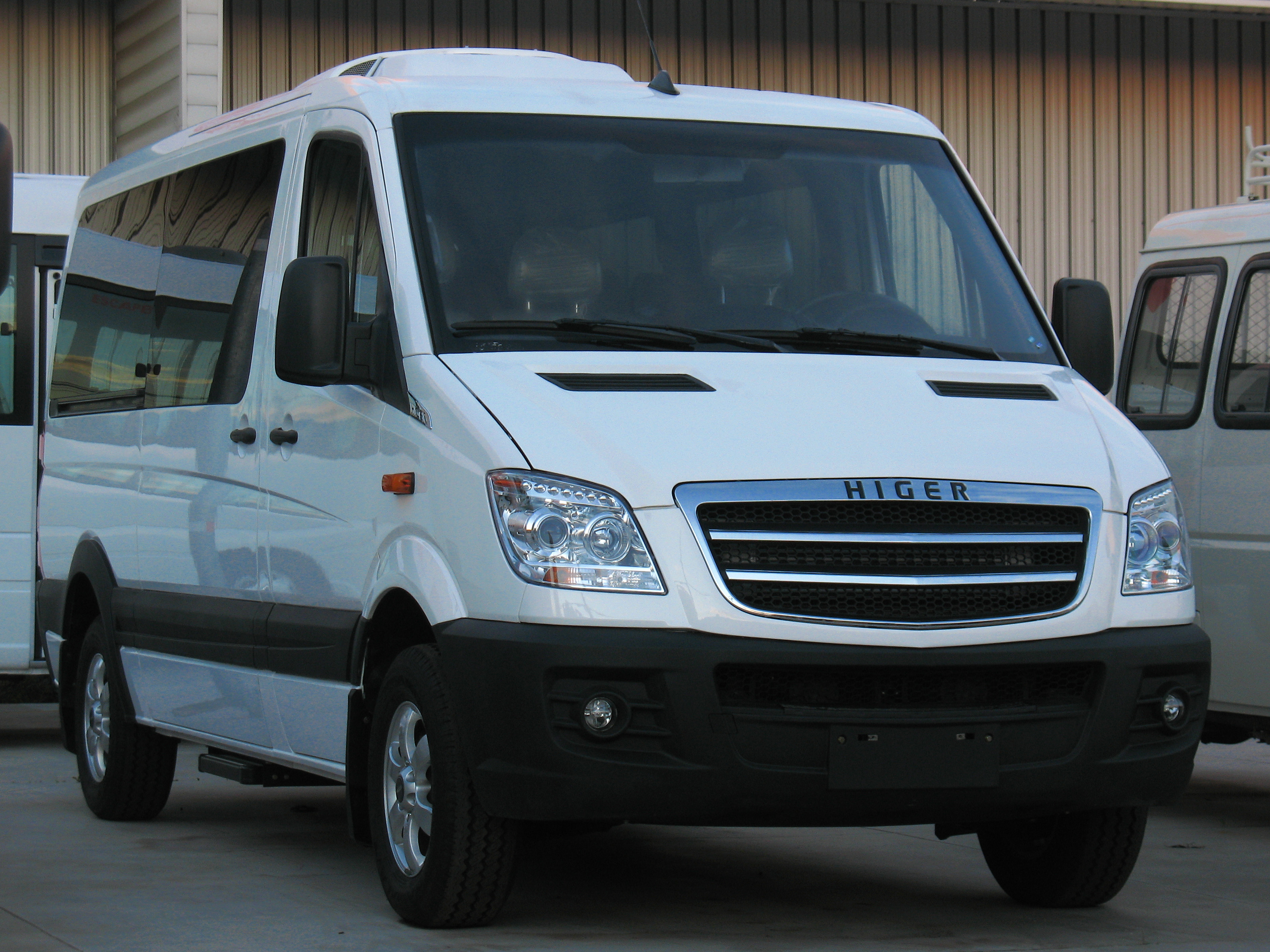

Overview
- Manufacturer: Higer Bus
- Also called: Higer H5V; Higer H6V (EV); Higer Haixing KLQ6701; Higer H5V B-camper; Higer H5V C-camper; Kawei JNQ6605BEV
- Production: 2014–present
- Assembly: China: Suzhou, Jiangsu

Body and chassis
- Body style: 4-door van 4-door minibus
- Related: King Long Jockey

Powertrain
- Engine: diesel: 1.9 L D19TDIE11 turbo I4; 2.7 L turbo I4; 2.8 L turbo I4
- Transmission: 6-speed manual single-speed (H6V EV)

Dimensions
- Wheelbase: 3,670 mm (144.5 in)
- Length: 5,910 mm (232.7 in)–6,005 mm (236.4 in)
- Width: 1,993 mm (78.5 in)
- Height: 2,540 mm (100.0 in)–2,840 mm (111.8 in)
- Curb weight: 985 kg (2,172 lb)–1,030 kg (2,270 lb)

The Higer Paradise or later the Higer H5V and Higer H6V, is a light commercial vehicle (van) built by Higer from China as a van, chassis cab, recreational vehicle, and minibus.

== Overview ==
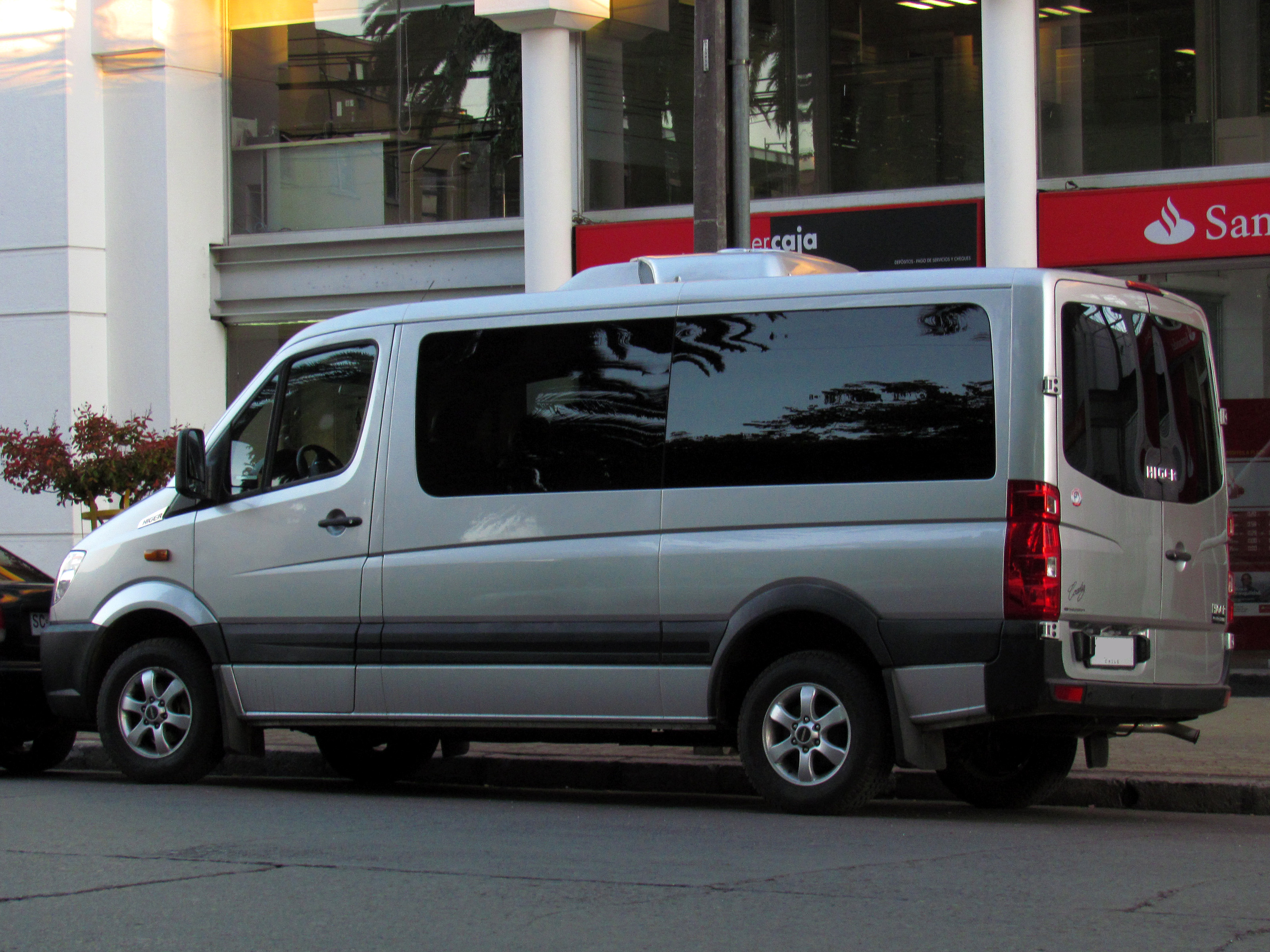
Higer Paradise rear

The Higer Paradise was introduced in China in 2014 with the H5V versions being fitted with internal combustion engines, the EV model is called the H6V. Recreational vehicle versions of the H5V was also available while the H6V remains to be the single model electric version of the Higer Paradise. The exterior design is controversial as the styling is clearly a reverse engineered design based on the Mercedes-Benz Sprinter.
