= Kawei =

Kawei may refer to:

- Jiangsu Kawei Automotive Industrial Group
  - Kawei K1, a midsize pickup
  - Kawei W1, a compat SUV
- Kaveh (Chinese: 卡维, Pinyin: Kǎwéi), a character from Genshin Impact
