= Karry Aika =

Chinese pick-up truck

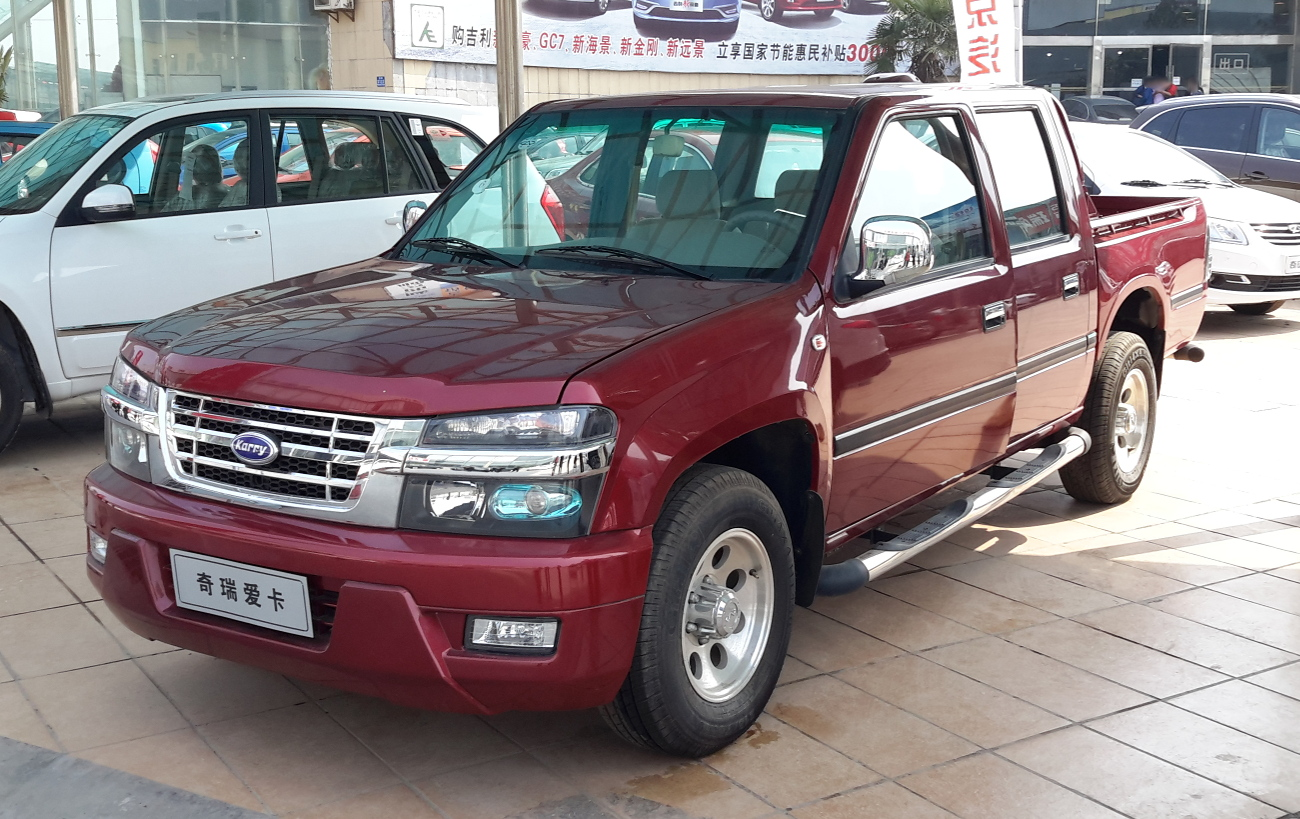
- Karry Aika

Overview
- Also called: Chery Aika
- Production: 2012–2017

Body and chassis
- Class: Compact pickup truck
- Body style: 4-door pickup truck (Crew Cab)
- Related: Isuzu Faster

Powertrain
- Engine: 2.3 L JM491Q-MEgasoline I4; 2.5 L DK4B diesel I4
- Transmission: 4-speed automatic 5-speed manual

Dimensions
- Wheelbase: 3,025 mm (119.1 in) (SWB); 3,380 mm (133.1 in) (LWB)
- Length: 5,090 mm (200.4 in) (SWB); 5,465 mm (215.2 in) (LWB)
- Width: 1,745 mm (68.7 in)
- Height: 1,710 mm (67.3 in)

Chronology
- Successor: Karry Higgo

The Karry Aika is a compact pickup truck that was manufactured and marketed by Chery between 2012 and 2017. It was built based on a reverse engineered Isuzu Faster (TF) chassis and similar styling.

== Overview ==
The Karry Aika was initially launched in October 2012, the double cab Karry Aika comes in two different versions. The Aika standard version has a 3025mm wheelbase and is 5090mm in length, while the Aika extended version rides on a 3380mm wheelbase and is 5465mm in length. The Karry Aika is manufactured in Kaifeng, Henan by Chery.

As of 2013, the Karry Aika is powered by a gasoline 2.3 liter gasoline engine built by XCE Mianyang Xinchen Engine Co., Ltd. The 2014 model year added models powered by a 2.5 liter diesel engine also from XCE Mianyang Xinchen Engine Co., Ltd. Power outputs of the engines are rated 82.5 kW (111 hp) at 3800rpm and 280 N⋅m (207 lb⋅ft) at 1800 to 2600rpm respectively.

== Styling controversies ==
Just like the Huanghai Plutus and JAC Ruiling, the styling of the Karry Aika is controversial as the Karry Aika has a design clearly resembling the first generation Holden / Chevrolet Colorado.
