= Huanghai Landscape F1 =

Chinese mid-size SUV

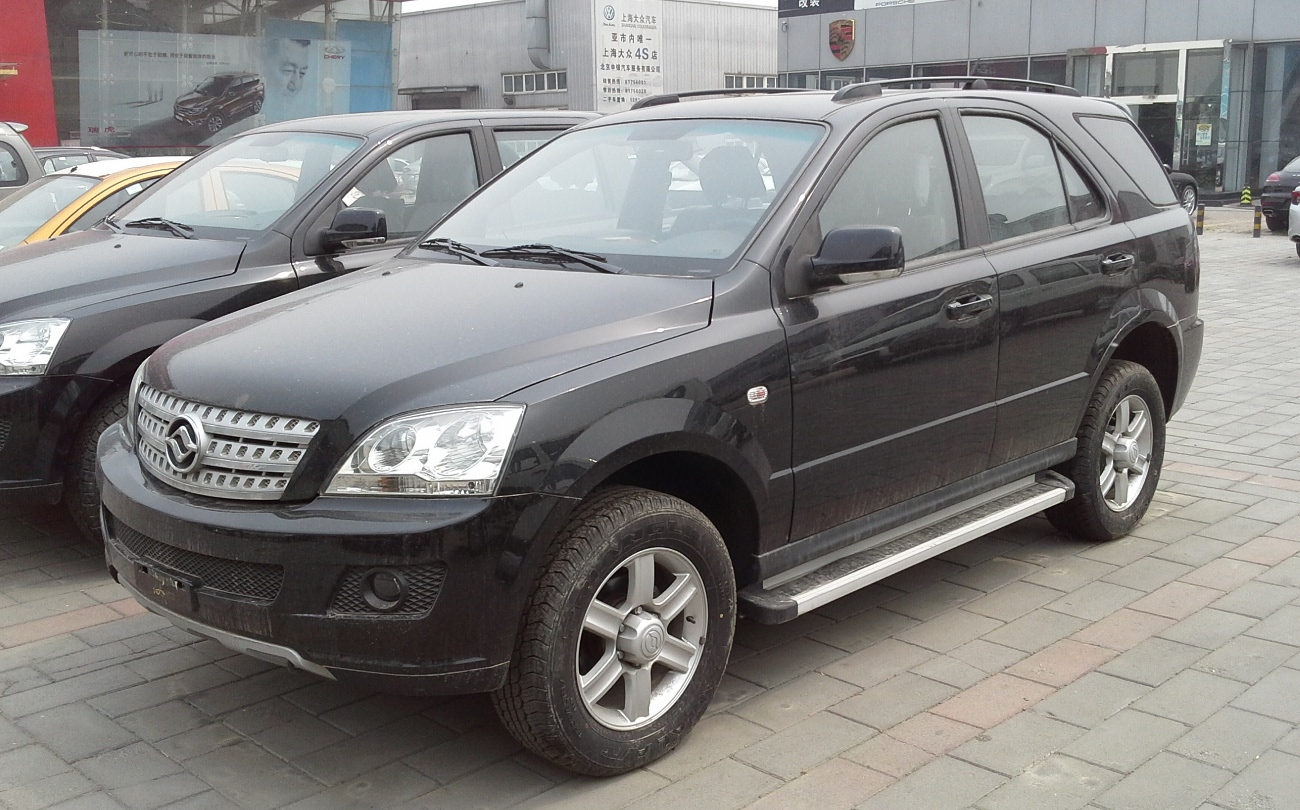
- Huanghai Landscape F1

Overview
- Manufacturer: SG Automotive
- Also called: Huanghai Qisheng F1; Huanghai Landscape CUV (pre facelift); Huanghai Qisheng CUV (pre facelift); Pyeonghwa Ppeokkugi 2405 (North Korea); Huanghai Plutus (pickup)
- Production: 2008-2012
- Model years: 2008-2012

Body and chassis
- Class: Mid-size crossover SUV
- Body style: 5-door SUV
- Layout: Front-engine, rear-wheel drive; Front-engine, four-wheel drive
- Related: Kawei W1; Huanghai Plutus

Powertrain
- Engine: 2.0 L 4G63 I4 (petrol); 2.4 L 4G64 I4 (petrol); 2.5 L turbo I4 (diesel)
- Transmission: 5-speed manual

Dimensions
- Wheelbase: 107 in (2,730 mm)
- Length: 182 in (4,620 mm)
- Width: 73 in (1,860 mm)
- Height: 72 in (1,830 mm)
- Curb weight: 1750-1860kg

The Huanghai Landscape F1 or Huanghai Qisheng F1 (黄海 旗胜F1) is a mid-size SUV produced and sold by SG Automotive (曙光汽车) under the Huanghai Auto (黄海) marque.

== Huanghai Qisheng CUV ==
The Huanghai Landscape F1 was originally revealed in 2008 as the Huanghai Landscape CUV or Huanghai Qisheng CUV, featuring an exterior body design resembling the first generation Kia Sorento with a front fascia resembling the second generation Hyundai Santa Fe.

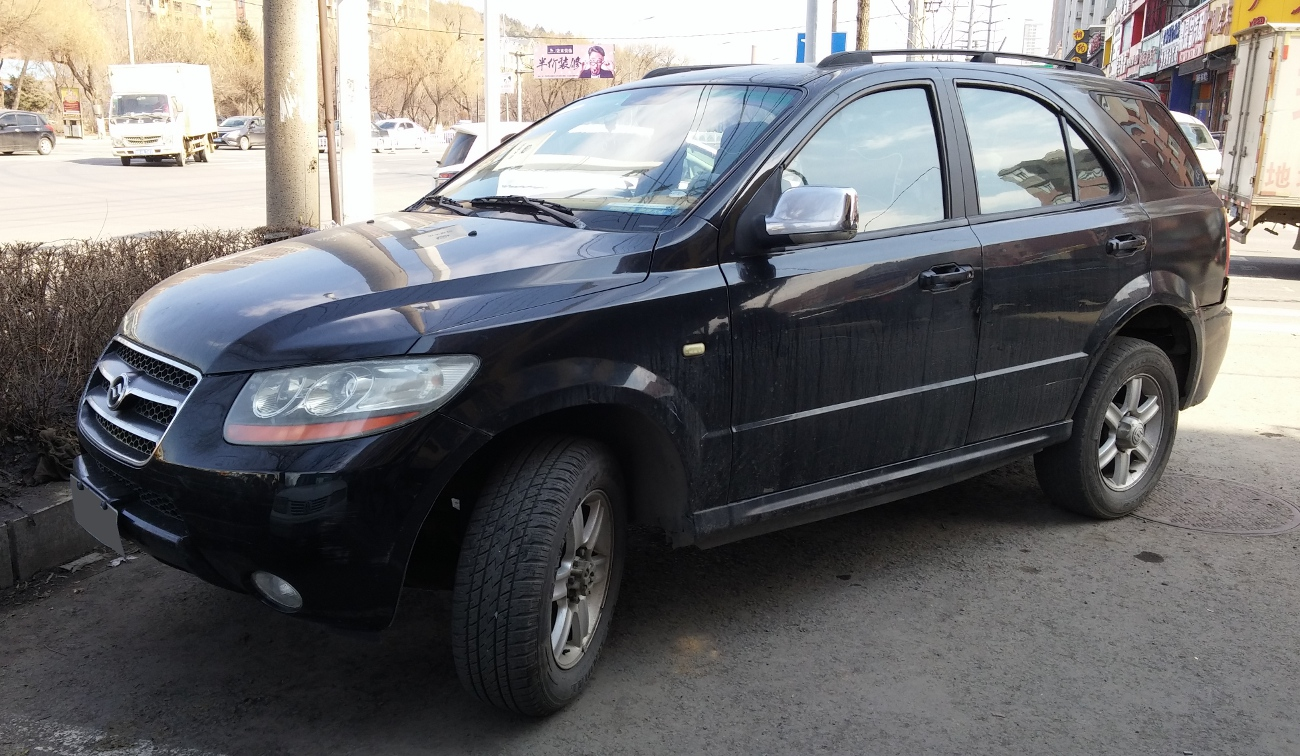
Huanghai Landscape CUV front

== Huanghai Landscape F1 ==
A version named Huanghai Landscape F1 replaced the Huanghai Qisheng CUV later, with the full exterior design resembling the first generation Kia Sorento, and grille inserts that resembles the Mercedes-Benz M-Class. The price of the Huanghai Landscape F1 ranges from 82,800 yuan to 99,800 yuan. This version was made available from 2009 to 2012.

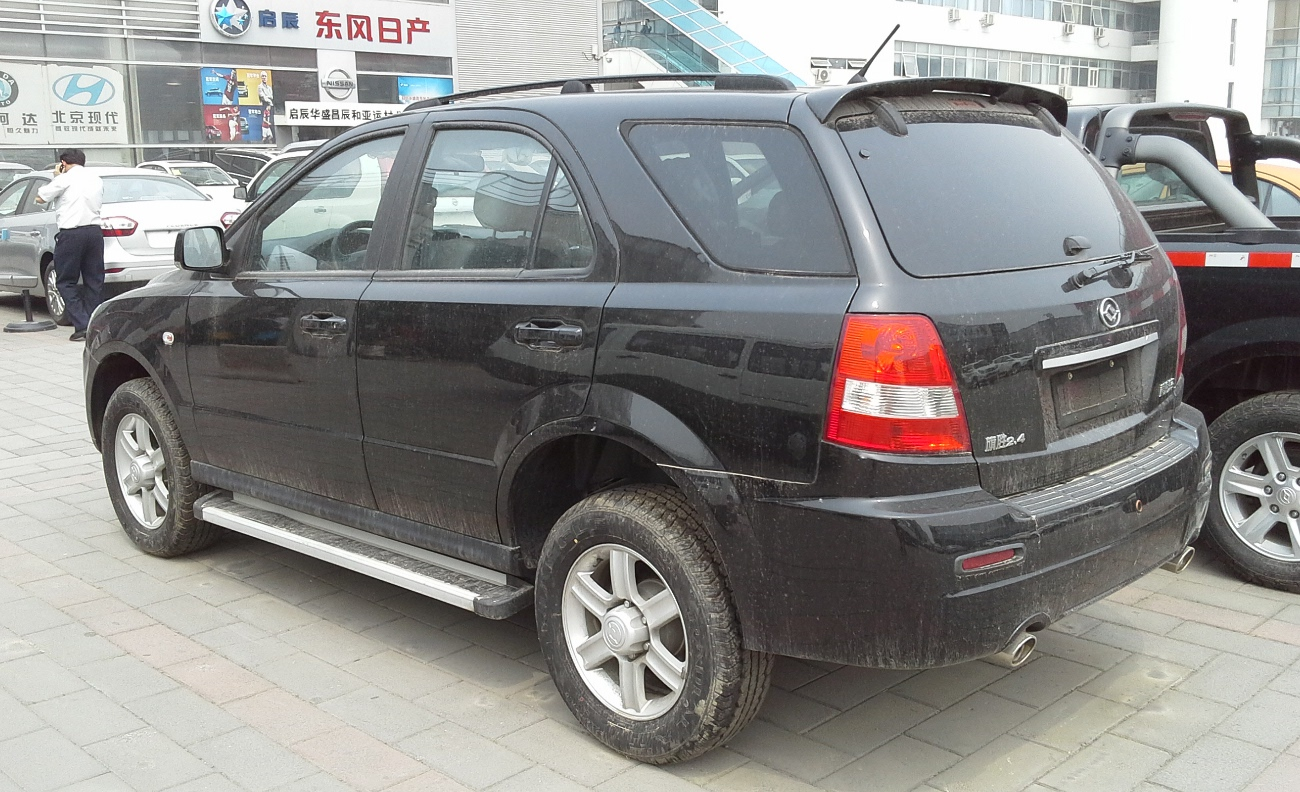
Huanghai Landscape F1 rear

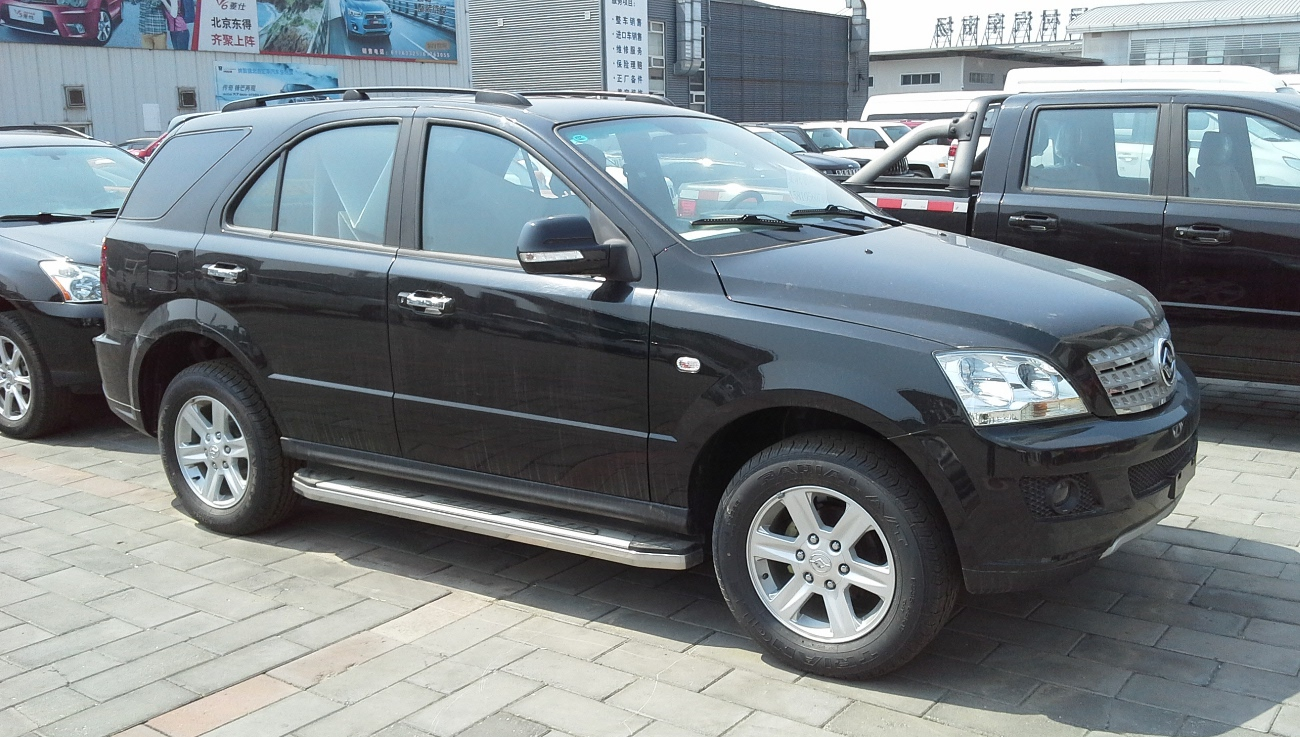
Huanghai Landscape F1 facelift front

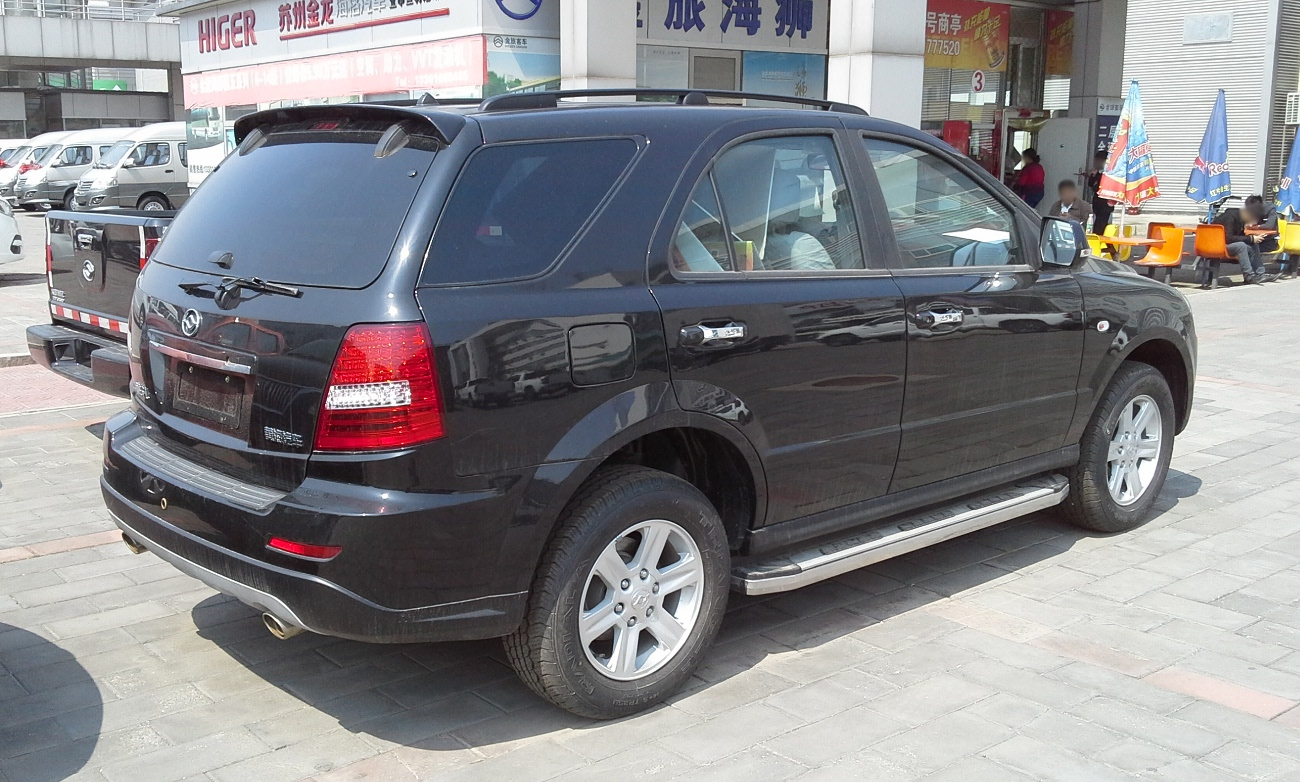
Huanghai Landscape F1 facelift rear

== Pyeonghwa Ppeokkugi ==
Since spring 2009, Pyeonghwa has been offering three different SUVs under the model name Ppeokkugi 4WD, which have not been divided into individual models, but in North Korea all three run under the same model name and only differ by an unofficial name affix. The entry-level model is a rebadged Chinese Huanghai DD6490A, which is a rebadged Huanghai Landscape F1 in China. The model sold in North Korea is called 4WD-A and is known in Vietnam under the Pronto GS name. The Pronto GS from Vietnam uses a Fiat engine with a displacement of 1997 cm^{3} and an output of 114 kW.

The Huanghai Qisheng CUV was rebadged as the 4WD-B, and ranks in the middle of the Ppeokkugi 4WD series. The model was sold in North Korea and also offered in small numbers in China. However, the model is not represented for the Vietnamese market. The design of the model is differentiated by a front end that resembles that of the Hyundai Santa Fe CM generation. The model is only produced to order.

The top model is the 4WD-C, which bears the name Premio MAX in Vietnam and was first presented to the public at the 2004 Motor Show in the Hoang Van Thu National Exhibition Center. Older Chevrolet pick-ups served as a model for the new model. At the same time, General Motors also revised its Chevrolet S-10. So it happened that in September 2004 the Pyeonghwa Premio MAX and the Chevrolet Colorado were presented at the same time and both companies accuse each other of corporate espionage and unauthorized plagiarismto have brought into series production. Despite these allegations, none of the companies has sought legal proceedings against the other to date. Both the 4WD-C and the Premio MAX are powered by diesel engines of the 4JB1 TL type, which have an output of 75 kW and a displacement of 2771 cm^{3}. The model has also been available as Huanghai SG Plutus in the People's Republic of China since July 2008. The vehicle parts are supplied by Mekong Auto.

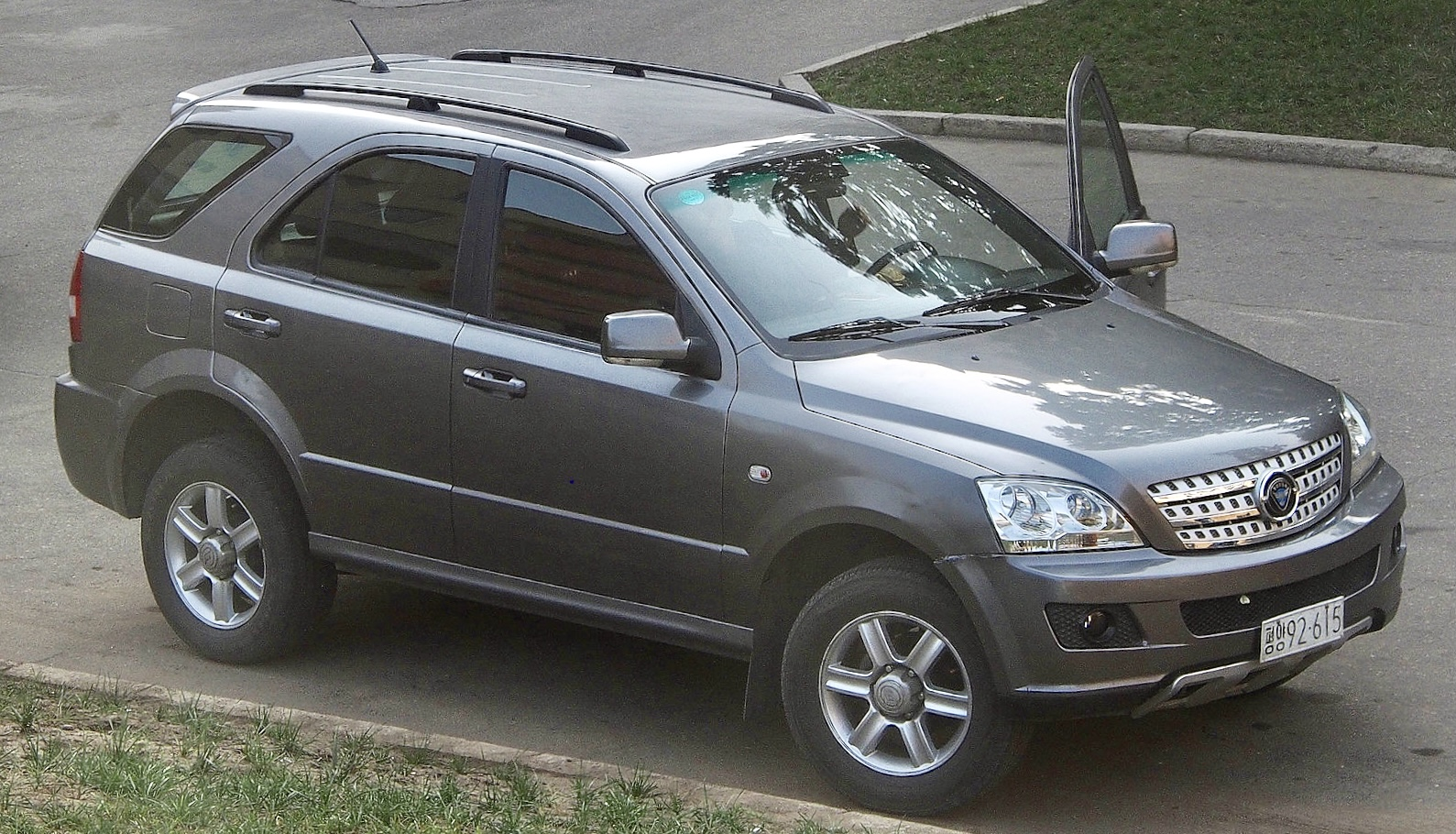
Huanghai Ppeokkugi 4WD

== Huanghai Plutus ==
The second generation Huanghai Plutus (大柴神) is essentially the pickup version of the Huanghai Landscape F1 SUV. The first generation was originally launched in 2009 with a front fascia resembling the first generation Chevrolet Colorado, the Huanghai Plutus was later facelifted to share the same front end as the Huanghai Landscape F1.
