= JAC Ruiling =

Chinese pick-up truck

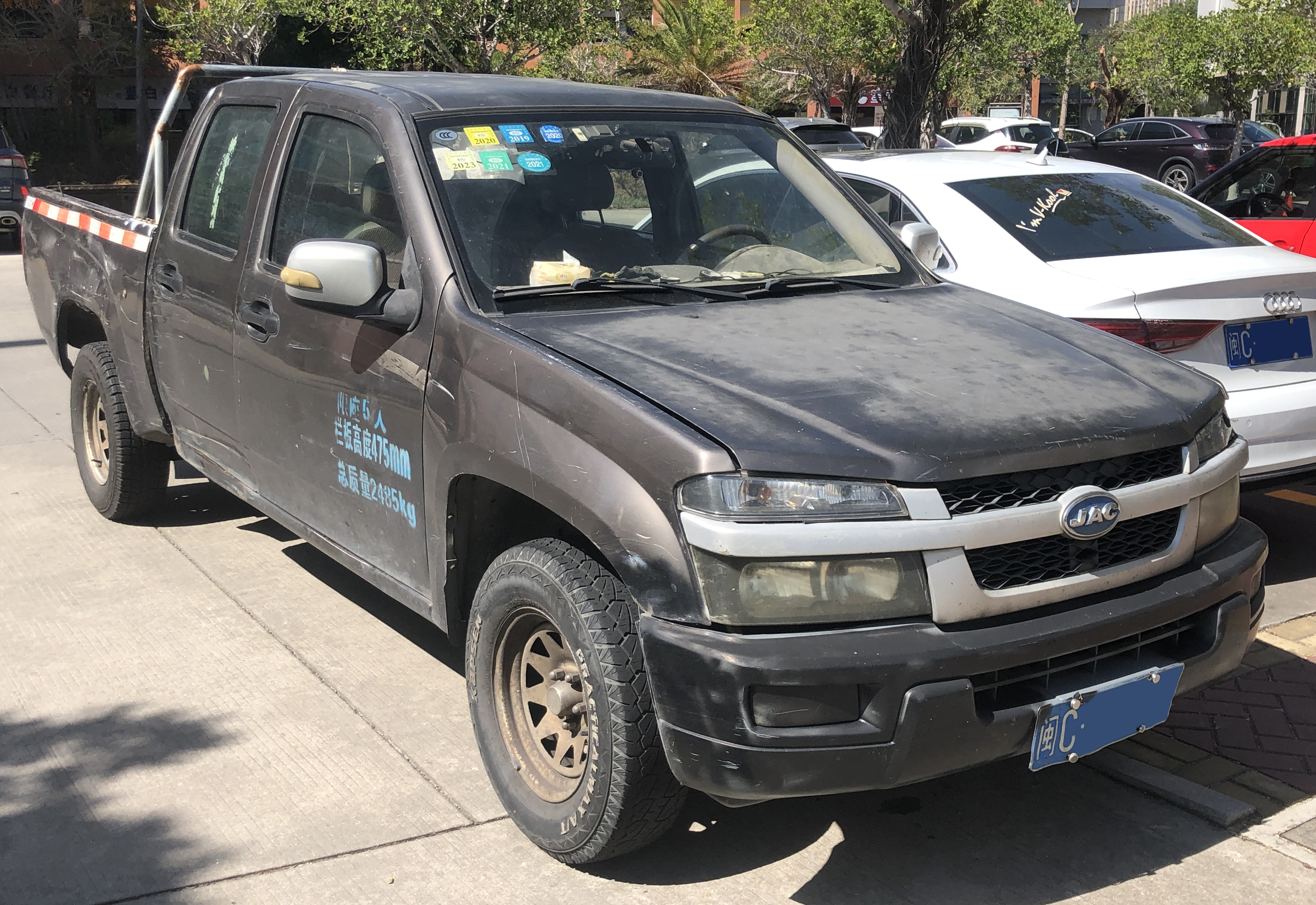
- JAC Ruiling (pre-facelift)

Overview
- Also called: JAC Reni; JAC K5
- Production: 2009-present

Body and chassis
- Class: Compact pickup truck
- Body style: 4-door pickup truck (Crew Cab)
- Related: Huanghai Plutus

Powertrain
- Engine: 2.8 L HFC4DA1-2B1diesel I4; 2.5 L 4B2-95C43 diesel I4
- Transmission: 4-speed automatic 5-speed manual

Dimensions
- Wheelbase: 3,025 mm (119.1 in)
- Length: 5,030 mm (198.0 in)
- Width: 1,720 mm (67.7 in)
- Height: 1,735 mm (68.3 in)

The JAC Ruiling (江淮瑞铃) is a compact pickup truck that was manufactured and marketed by JAC Motors from 2009. Originally produced and sold as the Anchi MC1021-K5 after Zhejiang Zhongneng Industrial Group revived Anchi Automobile in 2007, it was officially rebadged as the JAC Ruiling prior to JAC's acquisition of the Anchi brand in late 2010.

== Overview ==
At launch, the JAC Ruiling pickup has adopted the powertrain from JAC Refine M5. The engine satisfies the National III emission standard with 2.8-litre displacement and 80 kW (107 hp) of power. The JAC Ruiling pickup has a 1380mm long cargo bed and is 1450mm in width and 475mm in height.

== Variants ==
A few more rebodied upmarket variants featuring a Toyota-inspired front end was offered from 2012 till 2017 called the V1, V3, V5, and V6. Styling wise, the variants only has minor differences in the grilles between each other. The V3 launched in 2012 is powered by a 2.8-litre HFC4DA1-2B1 engine, the V1 launched in 2014 is powered by a 2.5-litre 4B2-95C43 engine, the V5 launched in 2014 is powered by a 491QE with the 2015 model powered by a 4B2-95C43 engine.

== Export markets ==
Export business is also the contribution of the JAC Ruiling pickup sales volume. Export volume of JAC Ruiling pickup has occupied 10% of the overall sales volume during the first year after its launch. Mali, Egypt, Peru, Angola, Colombia, and the countries in South Africa and Africa are the mainly exported countries of the JAC pickup.

== Styling controversies ==
Just like the Huanghai Plutus and Karry Aika, the styling of the JAC Ruiling is controversial as the JAC Ruiling has a design clearly resembling the first generation Holden/ Chevrolet Colorado.

== Gallery ==
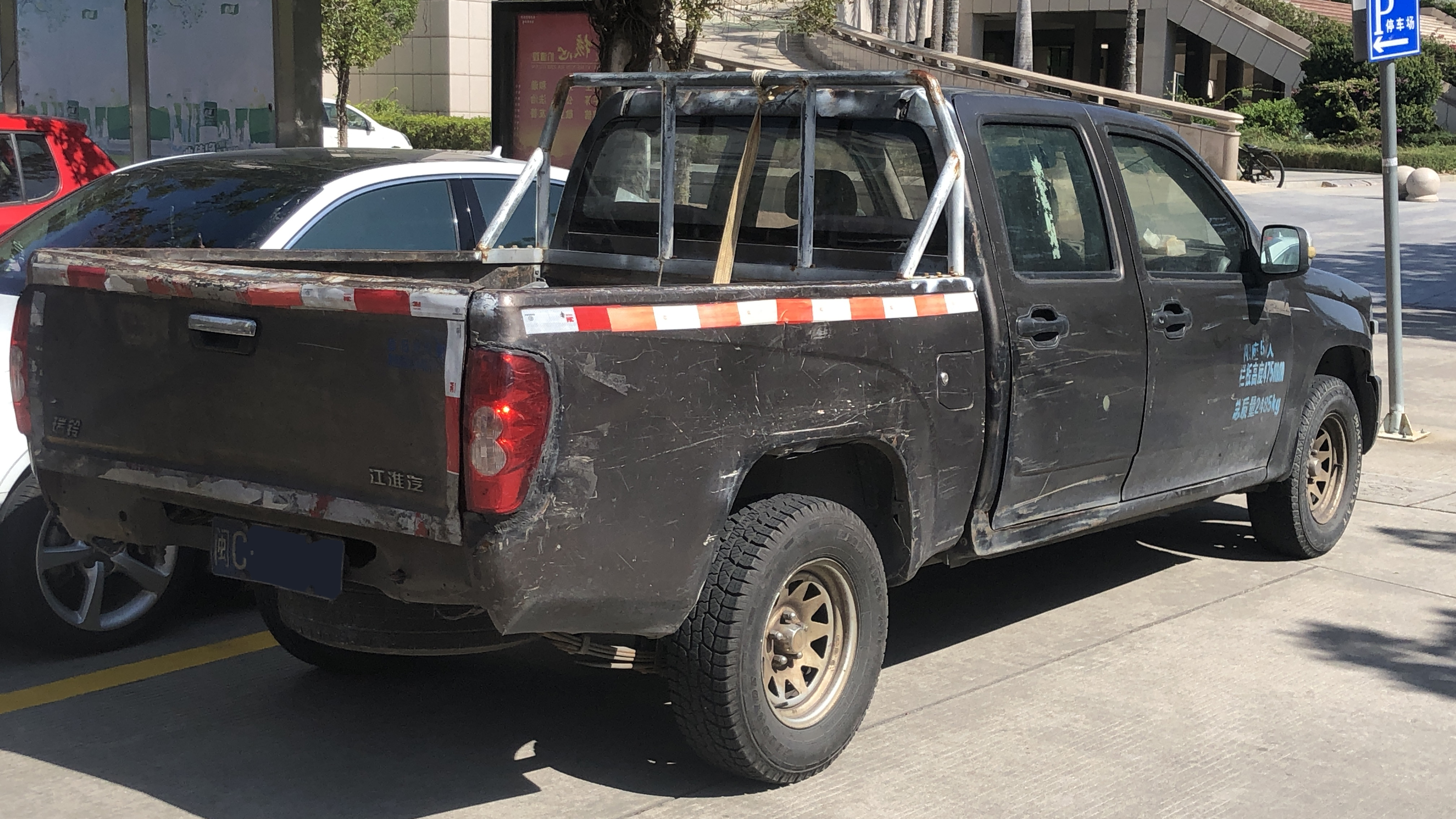
JAC Ruiling rear (pre-facelift)

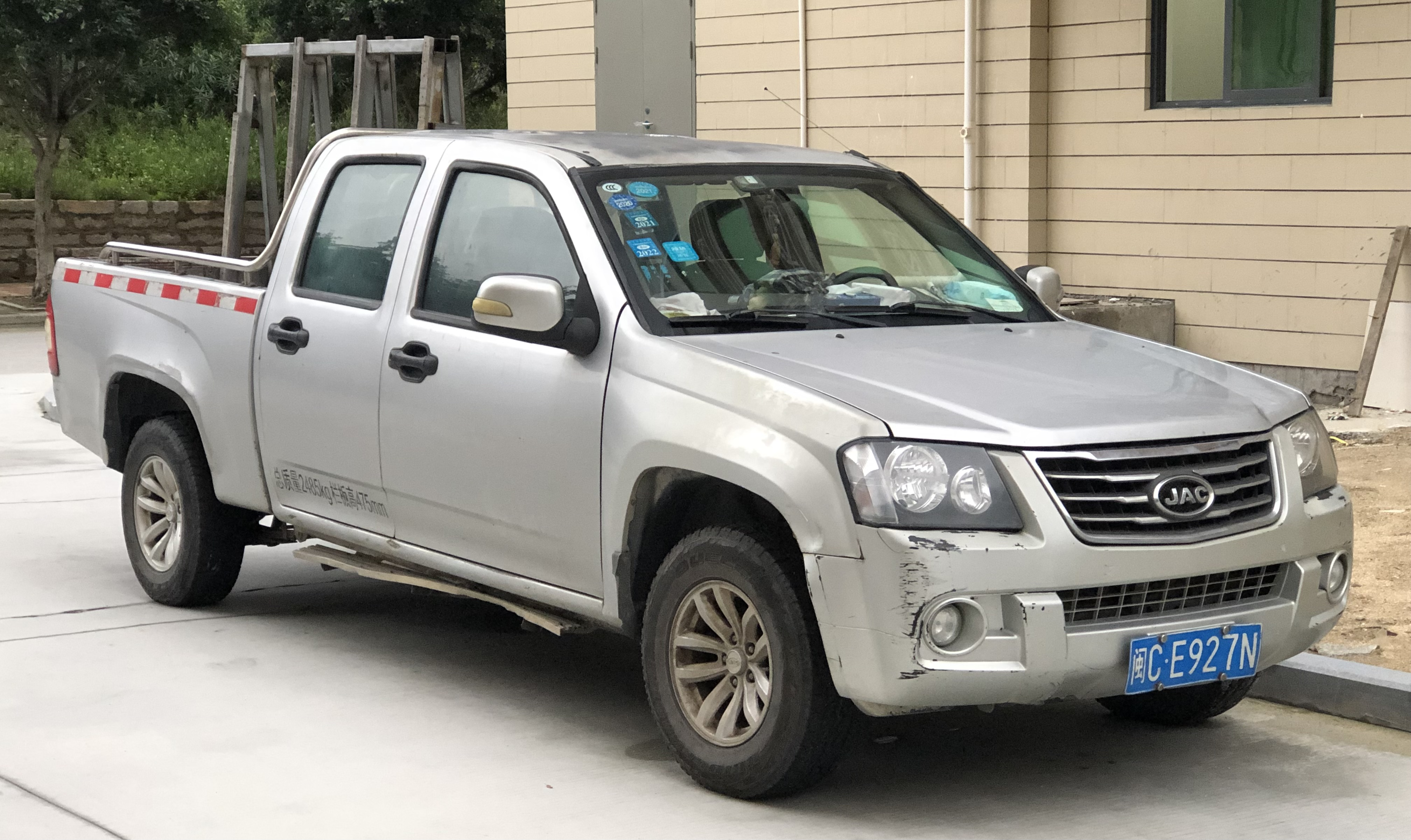
JAC Ruiling (facelift)

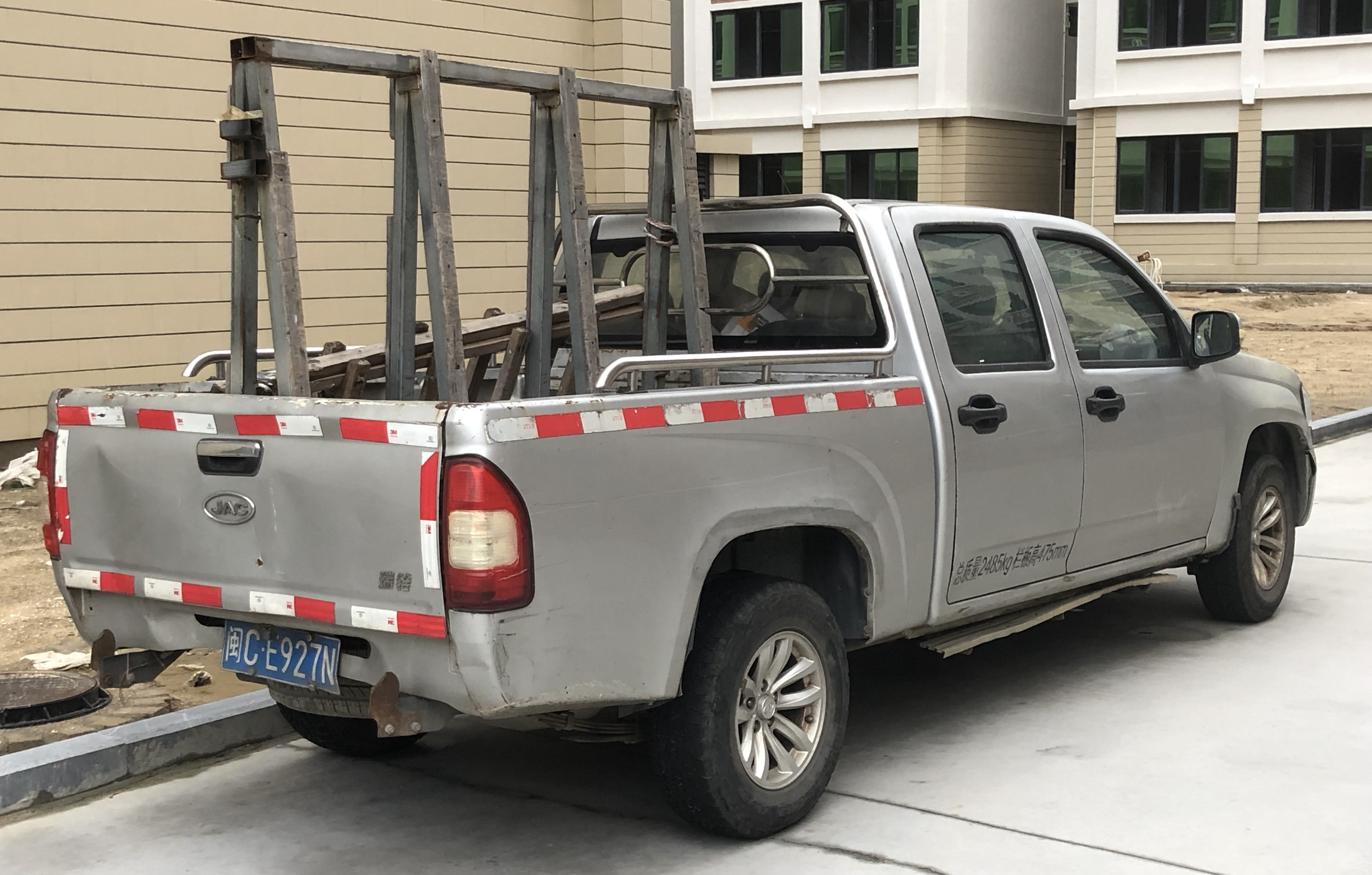
JAC Ruiling rear (facelift)

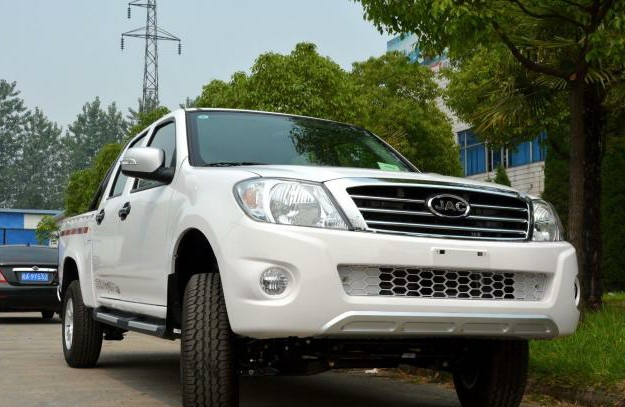
JAC Ruiling V5
