= Kawei K1 =

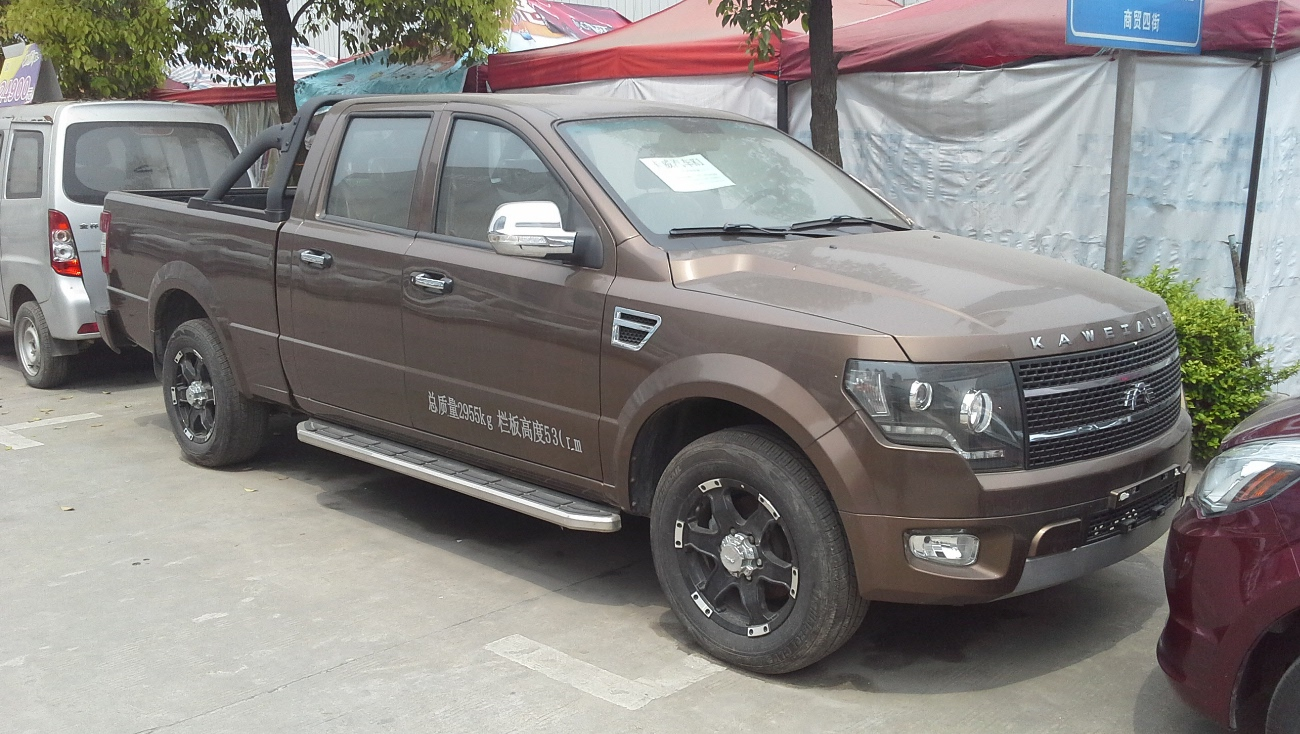

Overview
- Manufacturer: Kawei Auto
- Also called: Kawei K150; Kawei K150GT; Rayen Rapture (Iran)
- Production: 2014–2018
- Model years: 2014–2018
- Assembly: Danyang, Jiangsu; Bam, Kerman, Iran (RVMCO)

Body and chassis
- Class: Mid-size pickup truck
- Body style: 4-door Pickup truck
- Related: Kawei W1; Huanghai Plutus

Powertrain
- Engine: 2.4 L 4G69 I4 (petrol); 3.2 L CA4DC2 I4 (turbo diesel)
- Transmission: 5-speed manual

Dimensions
- Wheelbase: 3,500 mm (137.8 in)
- Length: 5,560 mm (218.9 in)
- Width: 1,895 mm (74.6 in)
- Height: 1,760 mm (69.3 in)
- Curb weight: 1,880–2,150 kg (4,145–4,740 lb)

The Kawei K1 is a mid-size pickup truck manufactured by Chinese automotive brand Kawei Auto, a brand of the Jiangsu Kawei Automotive Industrial Group Co., Ltd. The Jiangsu Kawei Automotive Industry Group is an automotive manufacturing company based in Danyang in Jiangsu Province.

The Kawei Auto K1 debuted during the 2014 Beijing Auto Show.

== Controversy ==
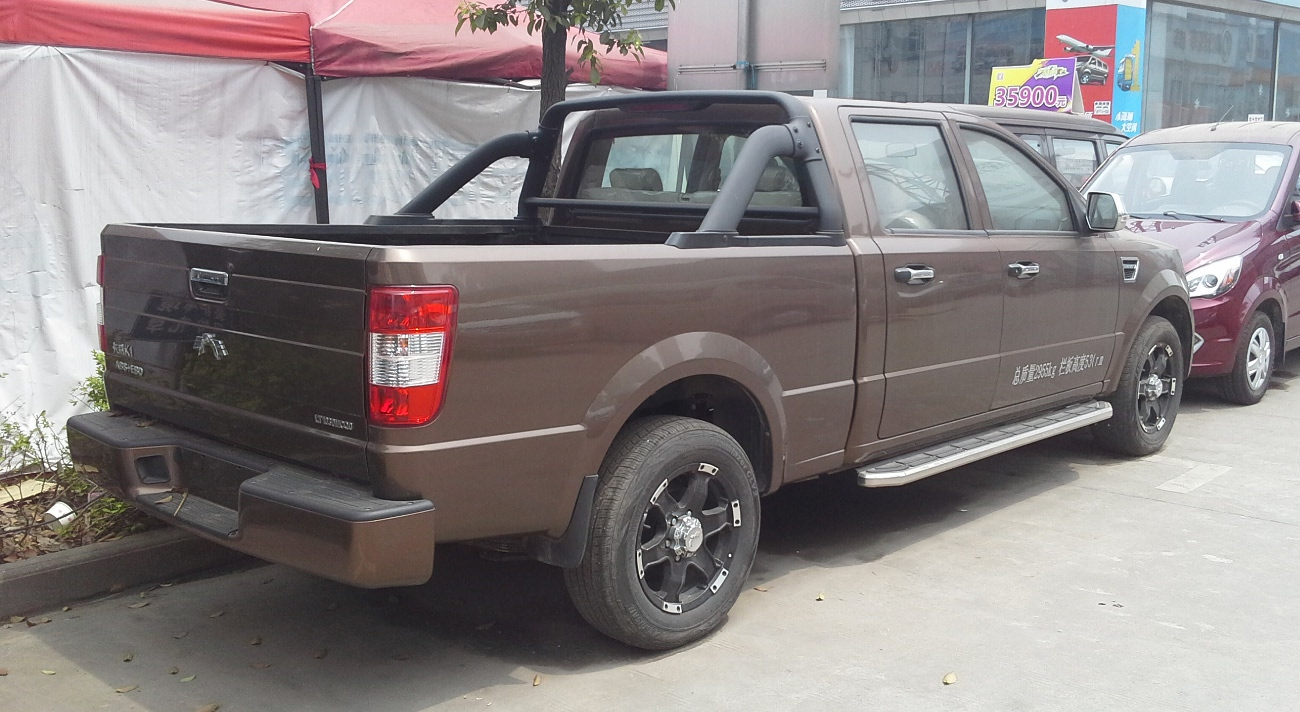
Kawei Auto K1 rear

Since its production, controversy has arisen due to the design of the Kawei K1 bearing a likeness to the twelfth generation Ford F-150 (which was in production from model years 2009 to 2014), making it an unlicensed clone.

== Kawei EV7 ==
In 2017, Kawei unveiled the Kawei EV7, based on the K1, claiming it to be the world's first pure electric full-size pickup truck.
