= Huanghai Plutus =

Chinese pickup truck

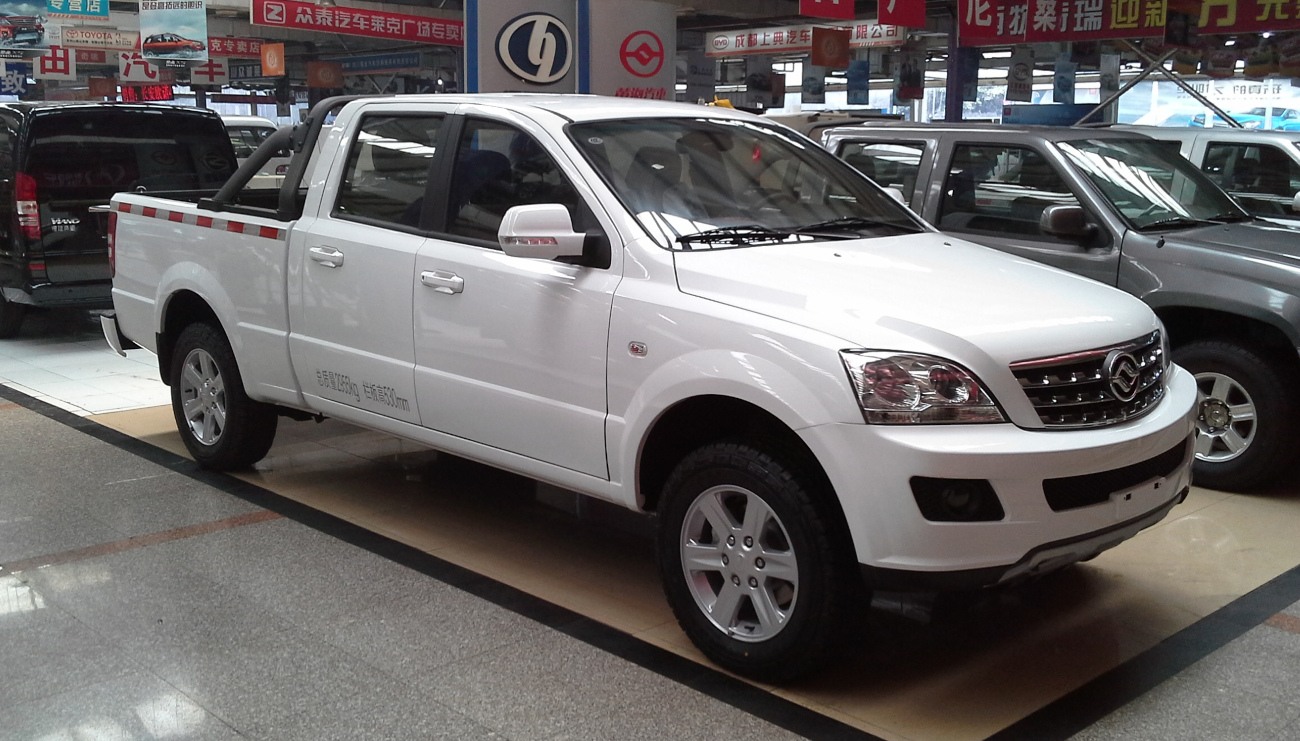
- Huanghai Plutus II

Overview
- Manufacturer: SG Automotive
- Production: 2007–2016
- Model years: 2009–2014

Body and chassis
- Class: Compact pickup truck (2007–2012); Mid-size pickup truck (2012–2016)
- Body style: 4-door crew cab
- Layout: Front-engine, rear-wheel drive/Four-wheel drive

The Huanghai Plutus (Chinese: 大柴神) is a pickup truck produced and sold by Chinese automobile manufacturer SG Automotive under the Huanghai Auto brand since 2007. The first generation sold from 2007 to 2012 was a compact pickup truck, while the second generation model sold from 2012 has grown to the mid-size pickup truck segment. The second generation model shares the platform with the Huanghai Landscape F1 SUV.

== First generation ==
Huanghai Plutus
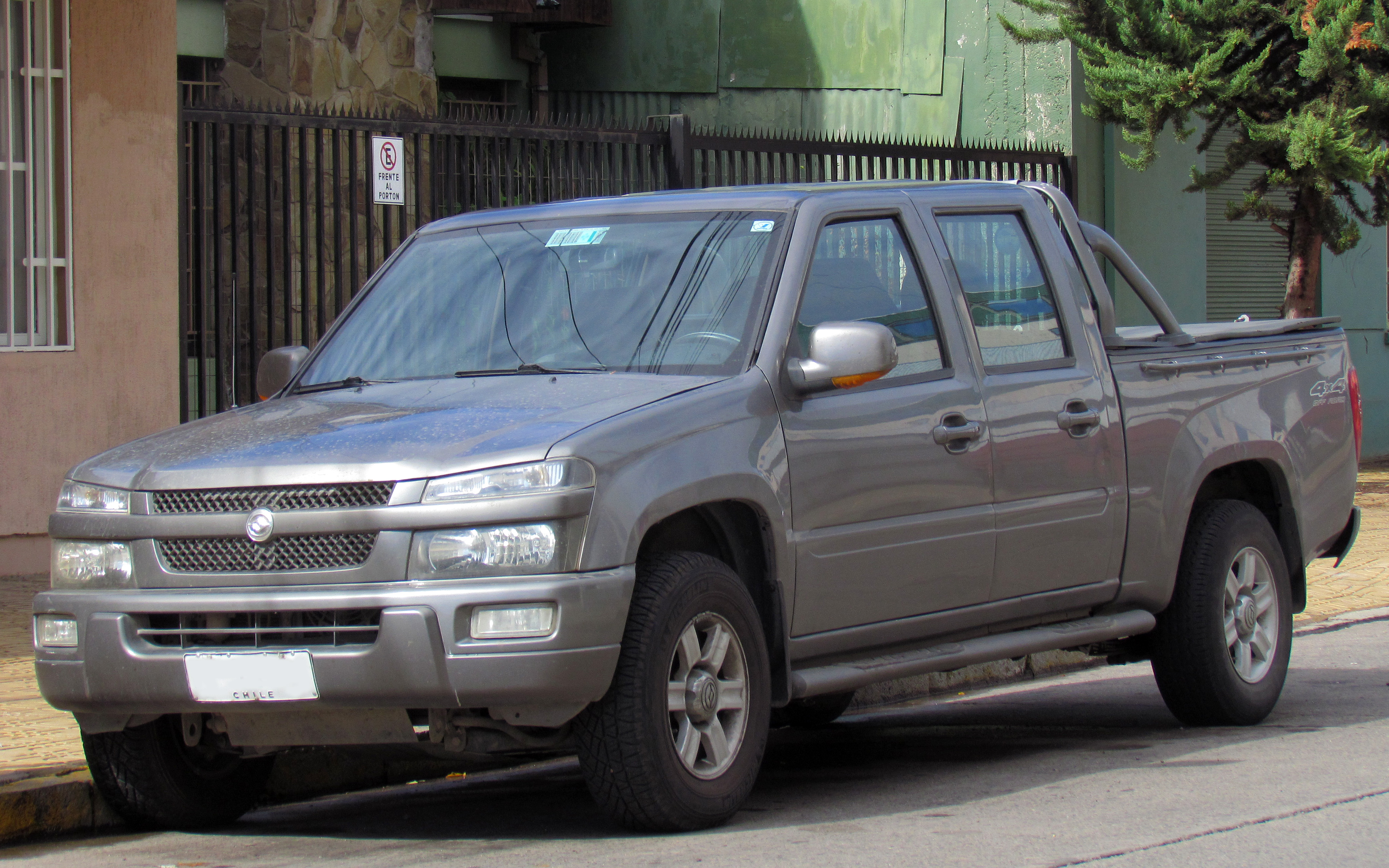

Overview
- Manufacturer: SG Automotive
- Also called: Huanghai Steed (Aojun); Effa Plutus; Pyeonghwa Ppeokkugi MAX (North Korea; rebadged Plutus); Pyeonghwa Ppeokkugi DX (North Korea; rebadged Steed); Pyeonghwa Premio MAX (Vietnam; rebadged Plutus); Pyeonghwa Premio DX (Vietnam; rebadged Steed)
- Production: 2007–2012
- Model years: 2009–2012

Body and chassis
- Layout: Front engine, rear-wheel drive
- Related: JAC Ruiling

Powertrain
- Engine: 2.0 L 4G63 I4 (petrol); 2.2 L 491Q-ME I4 (petrol); 2.4 L 4G69 I4 (petrol); 2.4 L 4D25 (turbo petrol); 2.8 L 4JB1T I4 (turbo diesel); 3.2 L CA4DC2 I4 (turbo diesel)
- Transmission: 5-speed manual

Dimensions
- Wheelbase: 3,380 mm (133 in)
- Length: 5,350 mm (211 in)
- Width: 1,725 mm (68 in)
- Height: 1,690 mm (67 in)
- Curb weight: 2,575–2,675 kg (5,677–5,897 lb)

The double-cab first generation Huanghai Plutus is available in 4X4 and 4X2 models, and is powered by an Isuzu-derived 4JB1T 2,771 cc diesel turbo engine that makes 100 hp (75 kW) and 230 N⋅m (170 lb⋅ft) of torque at 2,200 rpm.

No automatic transmission was available for the Huanghai Plutus and the sole transmission option is a five-speed manual.

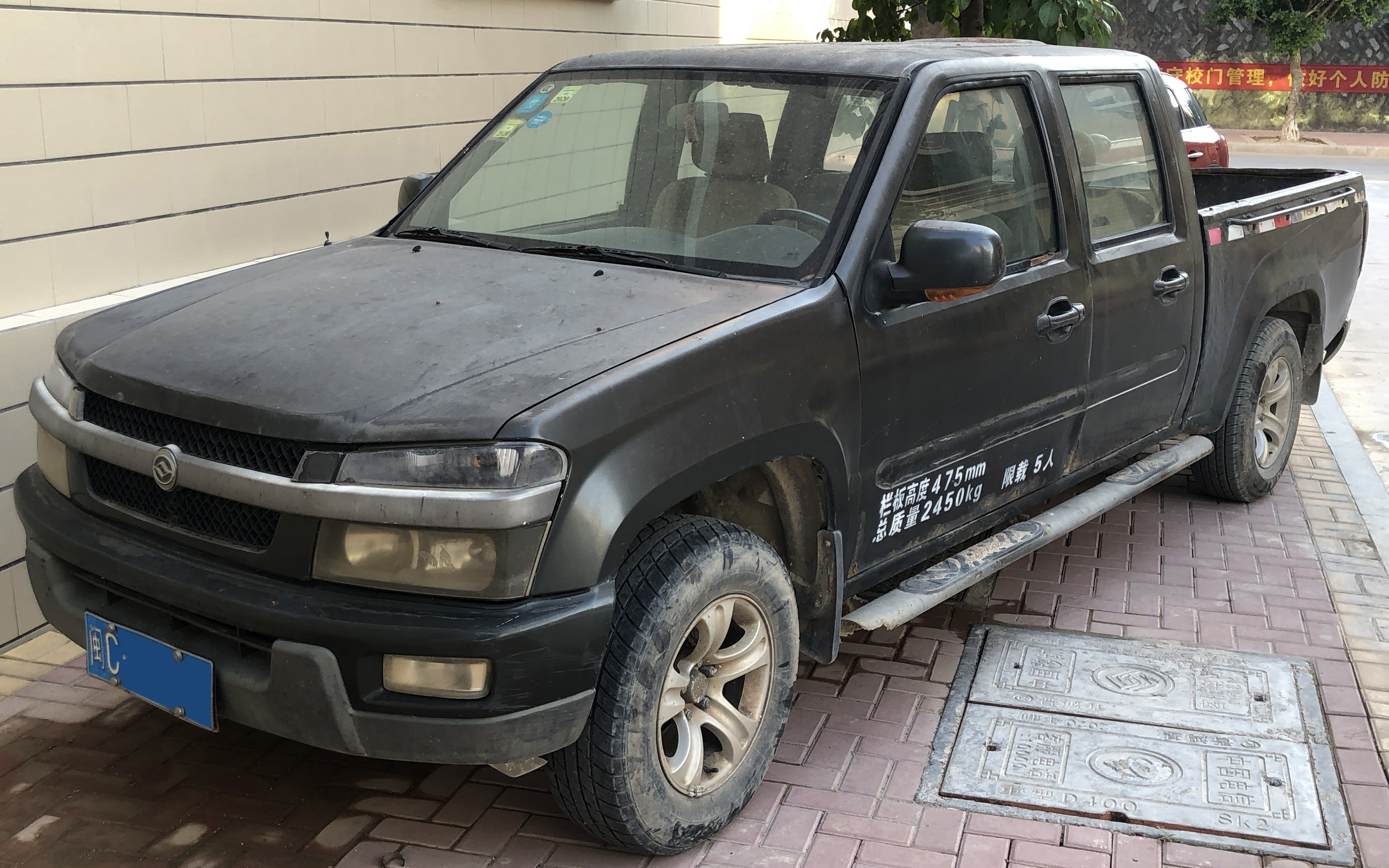
Huanghai Plutus front end

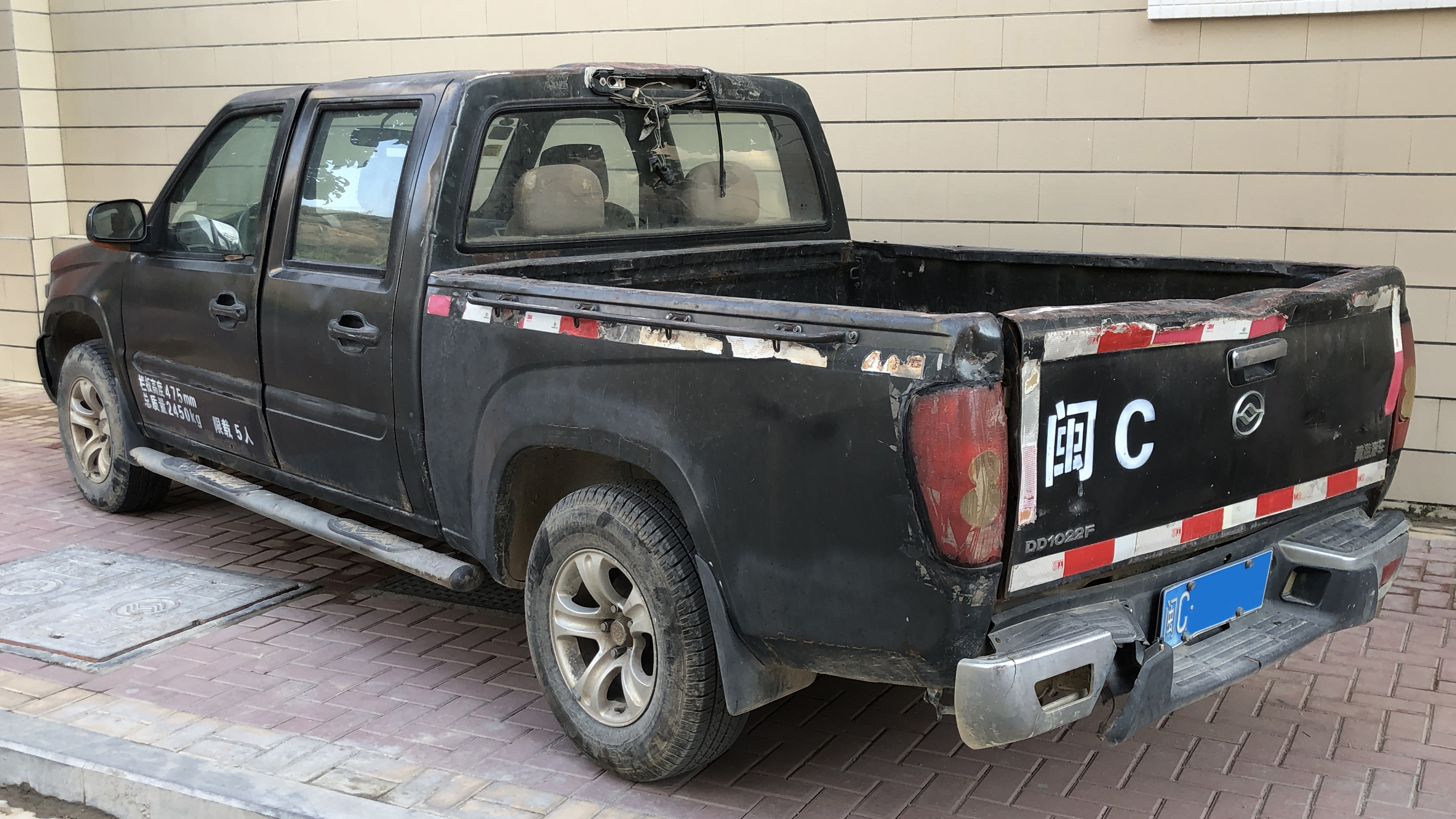
Huanghai Plutus rear end

A variant called the Huanghai Steed (Aojun, 傲骏) is also available featuring a restyled front fascia.

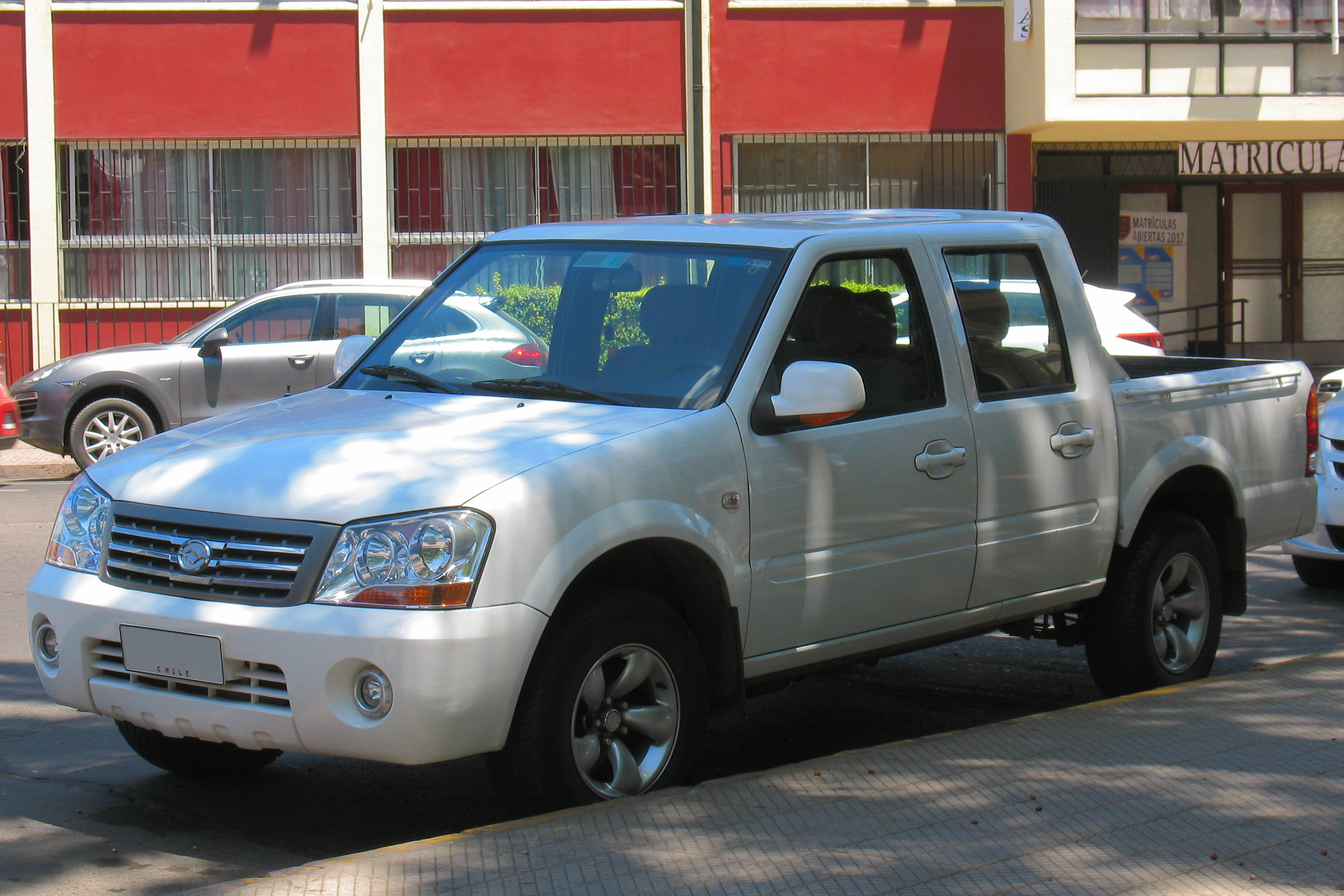
Huanghai Steed 2.2 Crew Cab 2014

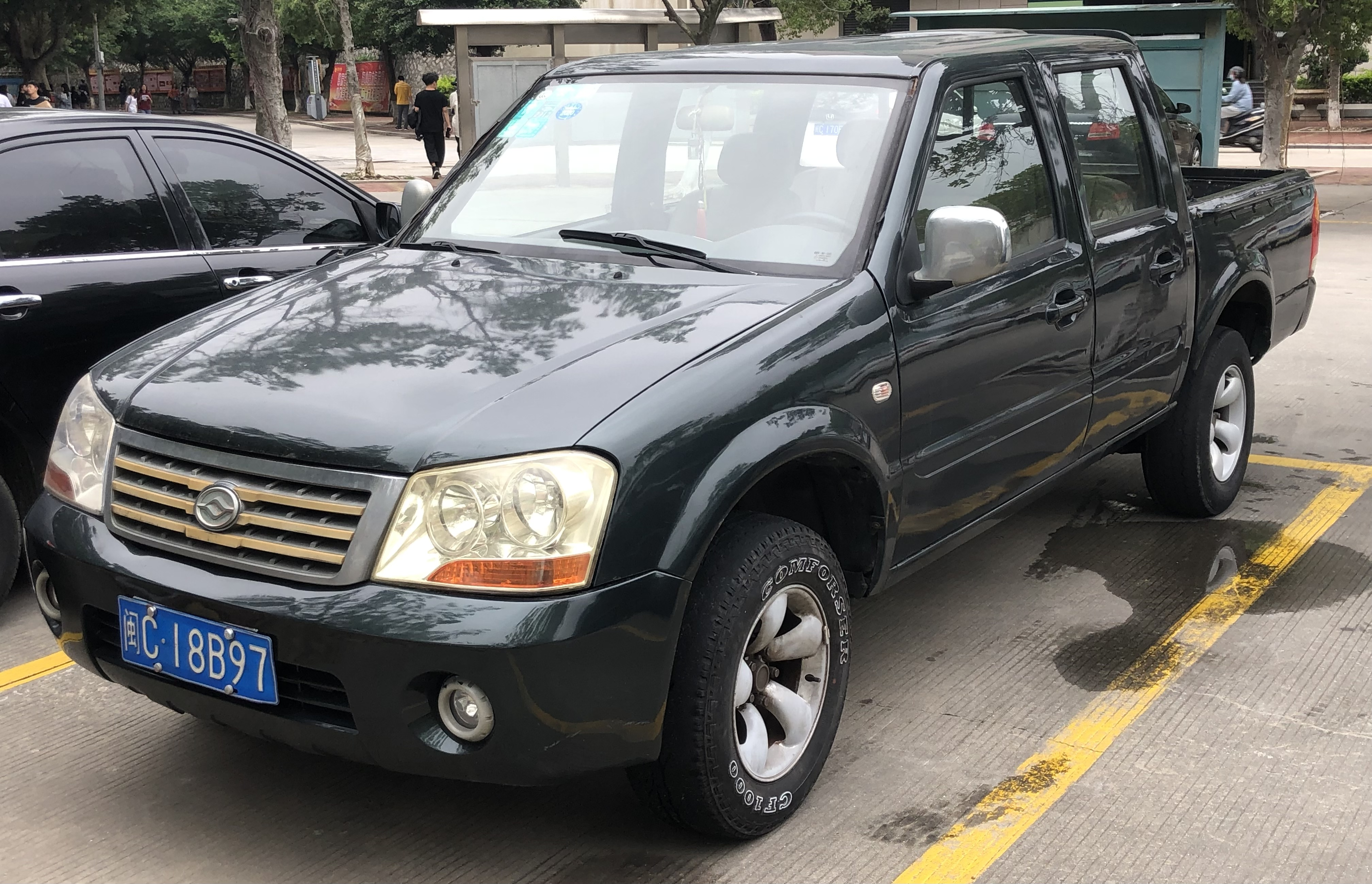
Huanghai Steed front end

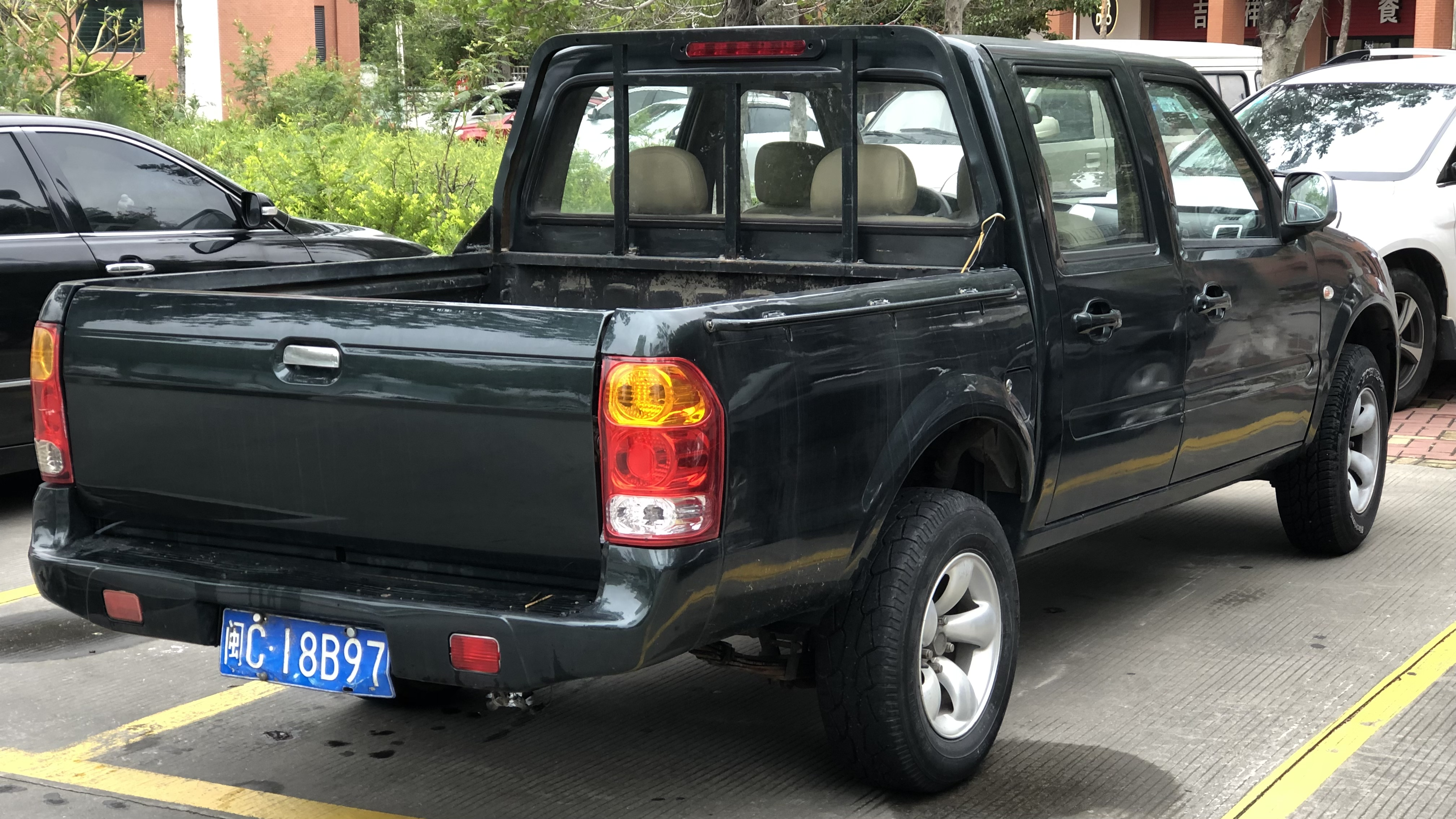
Huanghai Steed rear end

=== Markets ===
==== Malaysia ====
The standard Huanghai Plutus model in Malaysia includes ABS, EBD, a driver's airbag, an MP3/CD player, fog lamps, power windows, electric wing mirrors, and a reverse sensor. The first-generation Plutus is priced at RM61,923.60 for the 4X2 model and RM70,923.60 for the 4X4 model. The warranty is limited to two years or 60,000 km.

==== Vietnam ====
The PMC Premio Max is the Huanghai Plutus Classic sold in Vietnam with different badging. The truck was assembled in Vietnam by Mekong Auto, a joint venture between the Unification Church and North Korea.

==== Uruguay and Brazil ====
The Huanghai Plutus was also sold as the Effa Plutus by Effa Motors in Uruguay and Brazil.

=== Styling controversies ===
Styling of the pre-facelift first generation Huanghai Plutus has been controversial as the exterior design is heavily resembling the first generation Chevrolet Colorado. The post-facelift first generation model has a revised front end that resembles the Toyota Land Cruiser Prado instead.

== Second generation ==
Huanghai Plutus II
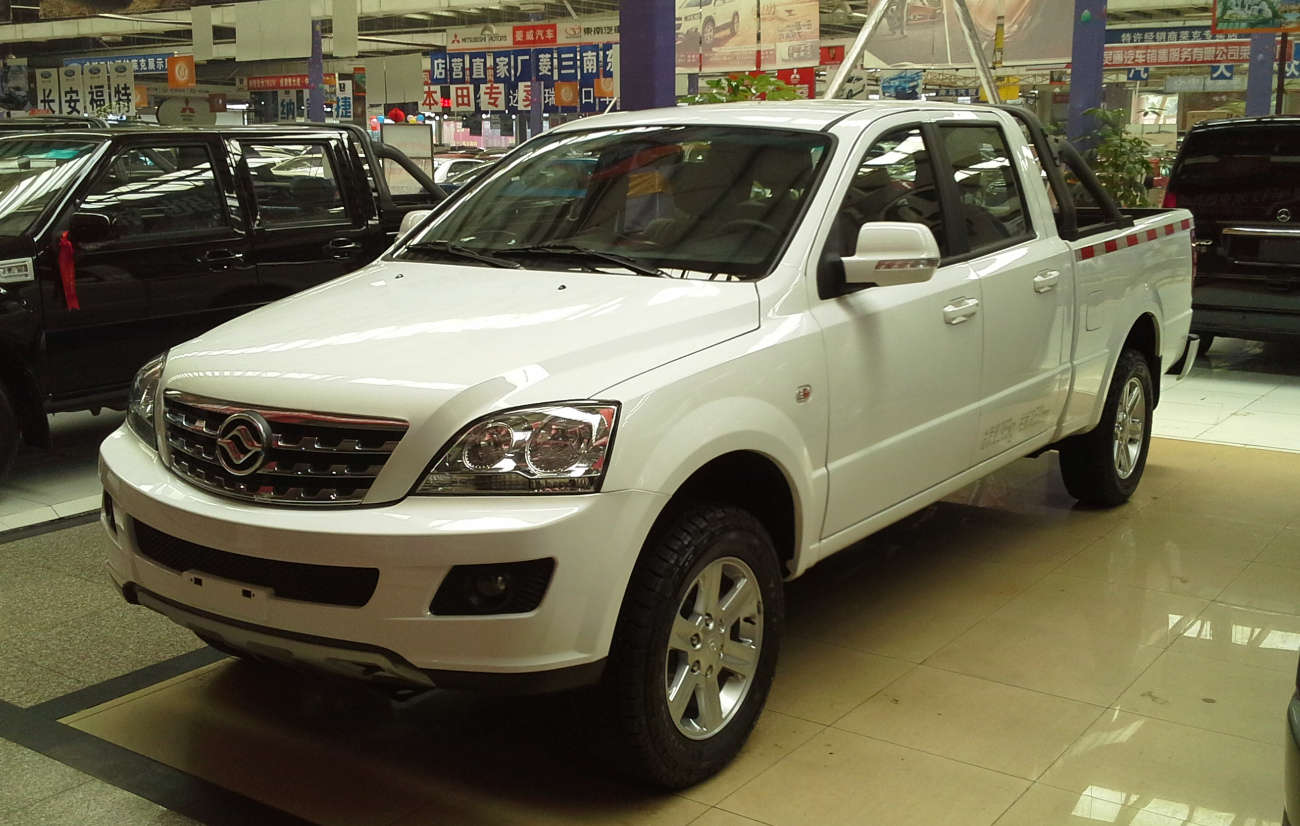

Overview
- Manufacturer: SG Automotive
- Also called: JAC Zhengtu; Pyeonghwa Ssangma 0104 (North Korea)
- Production: May 2012–2016
- Model years: 2012–2014

Body and chassis
- Layout: Front engine, rear-wheel drive
- Related: Huanghai Landscape F1; Kawei K1

Powertrain
- Engine: 2.4 L 4G69 (petrol); 3.2 L CA4DC2 I4 (turbo diesel)
- Transmission: 5-speed manual

Dimensions
- Wheelbase: 3,500 mm (138 in)
- Length: 5,560 mm (219 in)
- Width: 1,850 mm (73 in)
- Height: 1,790 mm (70 in)
- Curb weight: 1,880–2,150 kg (4,145–4,740 lb)

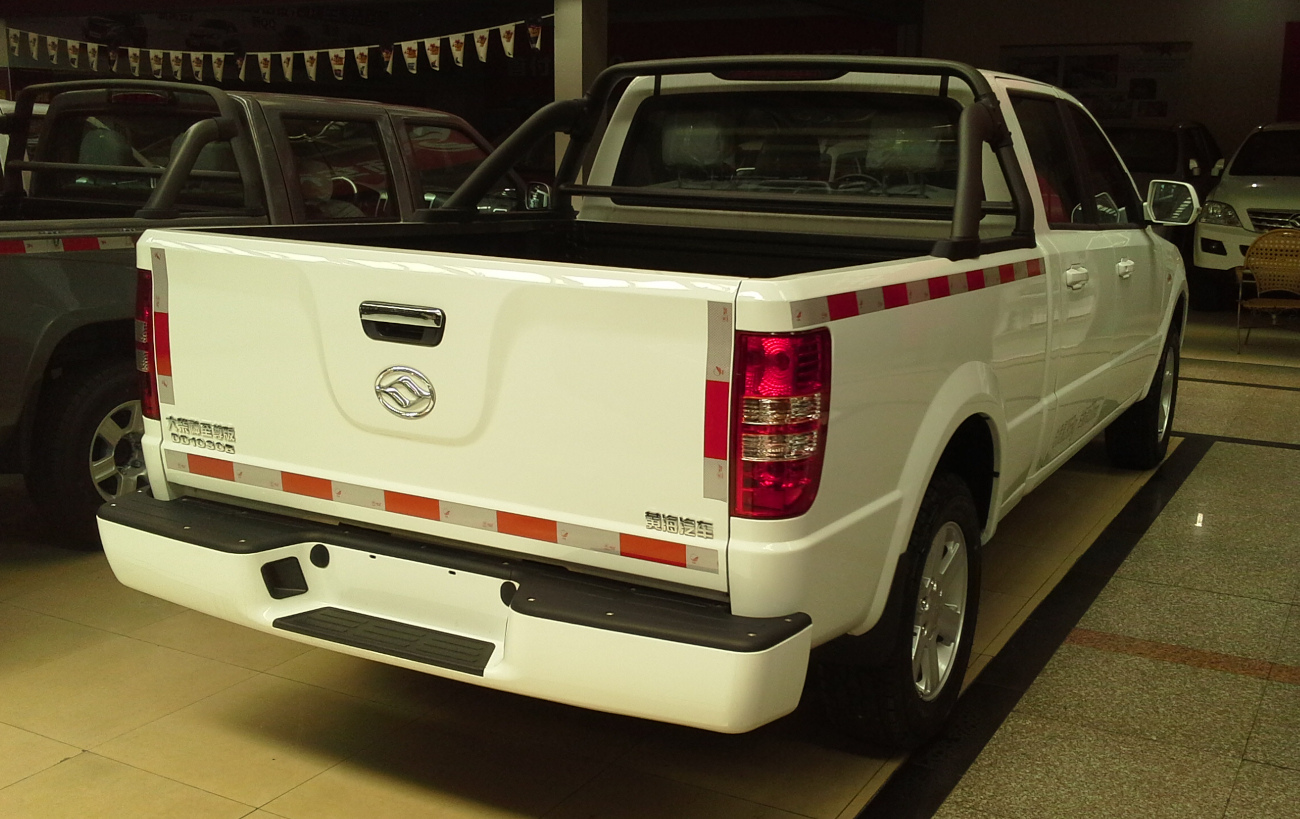
Huanghai Dachaishen 03 China 2014-04-16

The second generation Huanghai Plutus (大柴神) is essentially the pickup version of the Huanghai Landscape F1 SUV, sharing the same platform and same front fascia design. It was launched in May 2012.

=== Powertrain ===
The second generation Plutus is available with the 2.4 liter 4G69 petrol engine and 3.2 liter turbo diesel engine carried over from the previous generation Plutus. The 3.2 liter inline-4 turbo diesel engine is supplied by FAW Dachai and produces a maximum power of 107 hp (80 kW) at 3200rpm and a maximum torque of 245 N⋅m (181 lb⋅ft) at 2000rpm.

=== Styling controversy ===
Because the second generation Huanghai Plutus is based on the Landscape F1, its styling has been controversial as the exterior cab design is heavily resembling the first generation Kia Sorento, with the lower front bumper inserts resembling those found on the Mercedes-Benz M-Class.
