= Kawei W1 =

Chinese compact SUV

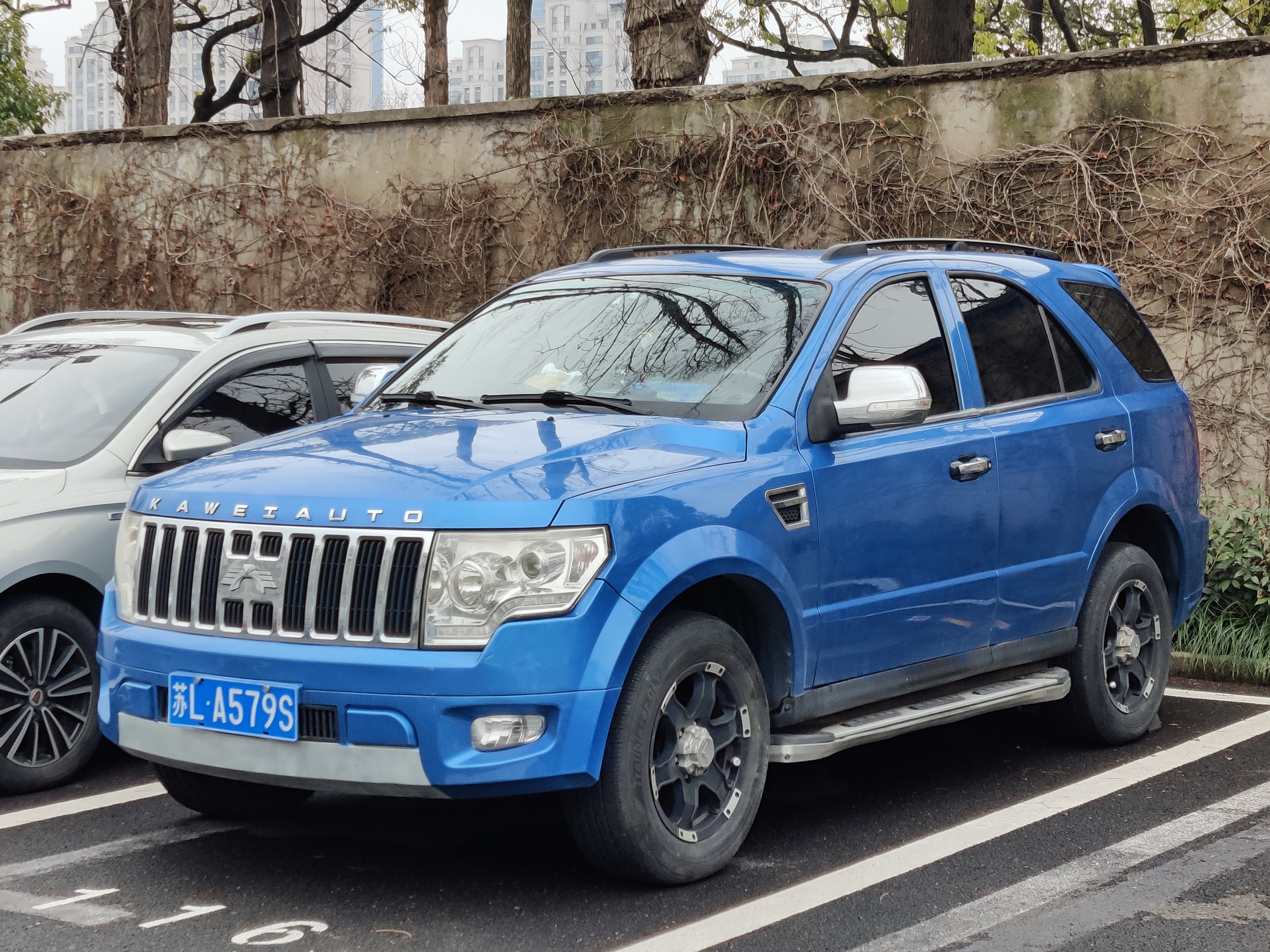

Overview
- Manufacturer: Kawei Auto
- Also called: Kawei Louis
- Production: 2014–2017
- Model years: 2014–2017
- Assembly: Danyang, Jiangsu

Body and chassis
- Class: Mid-size SUV
- Body style: 5-door station wagon
- Related: Kawei K1; Huanghai Landscape F1

Powertrain
- Engine: 2.0 L 4G63 inline-4 (petrol); 2.4 L 4G69 inline-4 (petrol)
- Transmission: 5-speed manual

Dimensions
- Wheelbase: 2,730 mm (107 in)
- Length: 4,600 mm (180 in)
- Width: 1,850 mm (73 in)
- Height: 1,810 mm (71 in)

The Kawei W1 is a compact SUV manufactured by Chinese automotive brand Kawei Auto, a brand of the Jiangsu Kawei Automotive Industrial Group Co., Ltd. The Jiangsu Kawei Automotive Industry Group is an automotive manufacturing company based in Danyang in Jiangsu Province.

== Overview ==
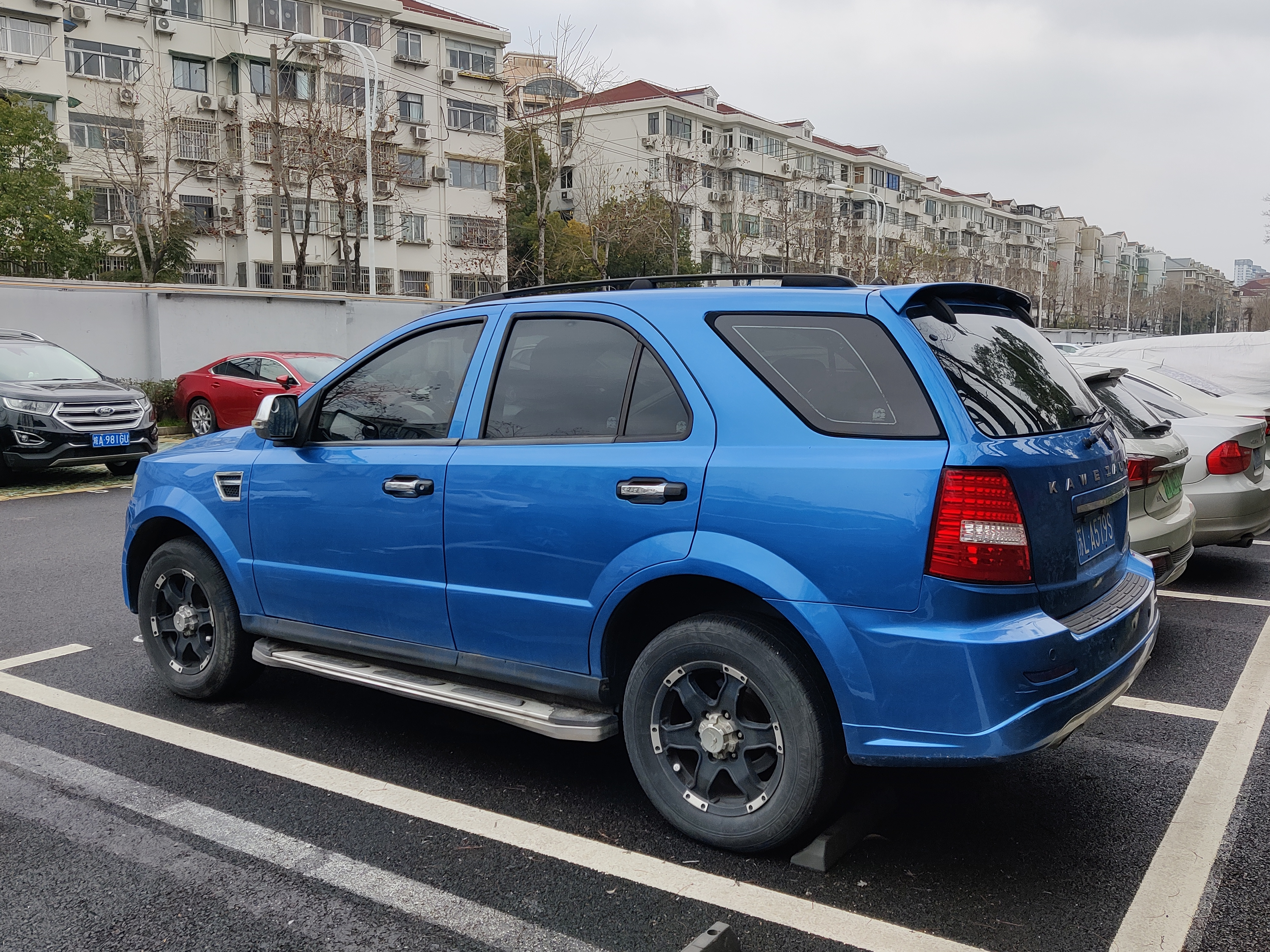
Kawei Auto W1 rear

The Kawei Auto W1 SUV debuted with the K1 pickup truck during the 2014 Beijing Auto Show, and the W1 was updated with a facelift in 2017.

== Controversy ==
Since its production, controversy has arisen due to the fact that the majority of the exterior design of the Kawei W1 bears the likeness of the first generation Kia Sorento (2002–2009) with the front end resembling the twelfth generation Ford F-150 (2009–2014) just like the Kawei K1, hence making it an unlicensed clone.

== Kawei EV1 (Kawei W1 EV) ==
In 2017, Kawei unveiled the Kawei EV1, based on the Kawei W1. The Kawei EV1 is powered by an electric motor producing 109 hp and a 48.52kWh battery with a range of 250 km.
