= Jiangsu Kawei Automotive Industrial Group =

Chinese automobile manufacturer

Jiangsu Kawei Automotive Industrial Group Co., Ltd.
- Type: Private Co. Ltd.
- Industry: Automotive
- Founded: 1992
- Headquarters: Jiangsu, People's Republic of China
- Area served: Mainland China
- Products: Automobiles
- Website: en.kaweigroup.com

The Jiangsu Kawei Automotive Industrial Group is an automotive manufacturing company of People's Republic of China based in Danyang in Jiangsu Province.

== Company history ==
The Jiangsu Kawei Automotive Industrial Group was founded in 1992 and started out making mini buses, special vehicles, and vehicle parts.

In 2012, Jiangsu Kawei Automotive Industry Group started to build cars and the Kawei Auto (卡威汽车) brand was launched.

== Vehicles ==
Vehicle products of Jiangsu Kawei Automotive Industrial Group are listed as below:

=== Pickups and SUVs ===
- Kawei K1
- Kawei K150
- Kawei K150GT
- Kawei W1 (Kawei Louis)
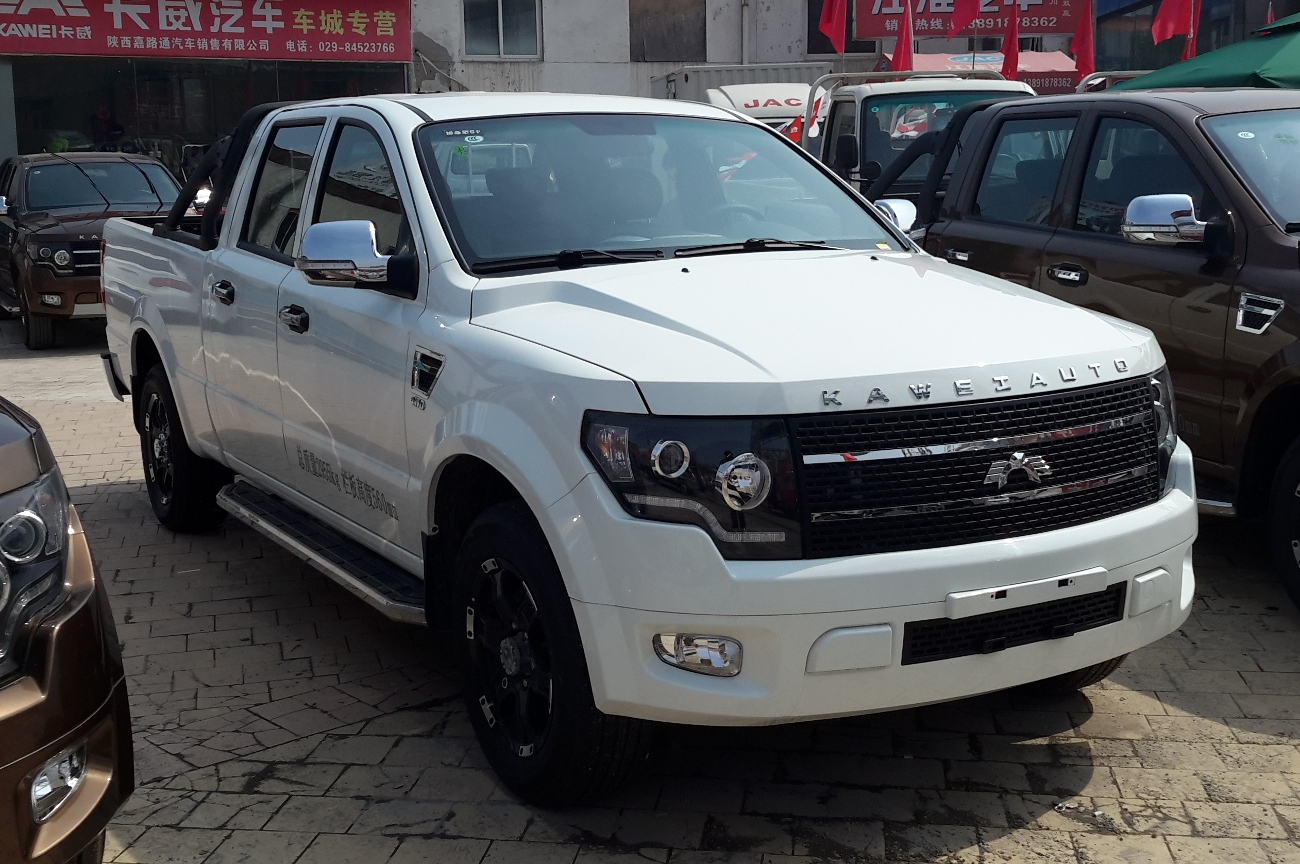
Kawei K1

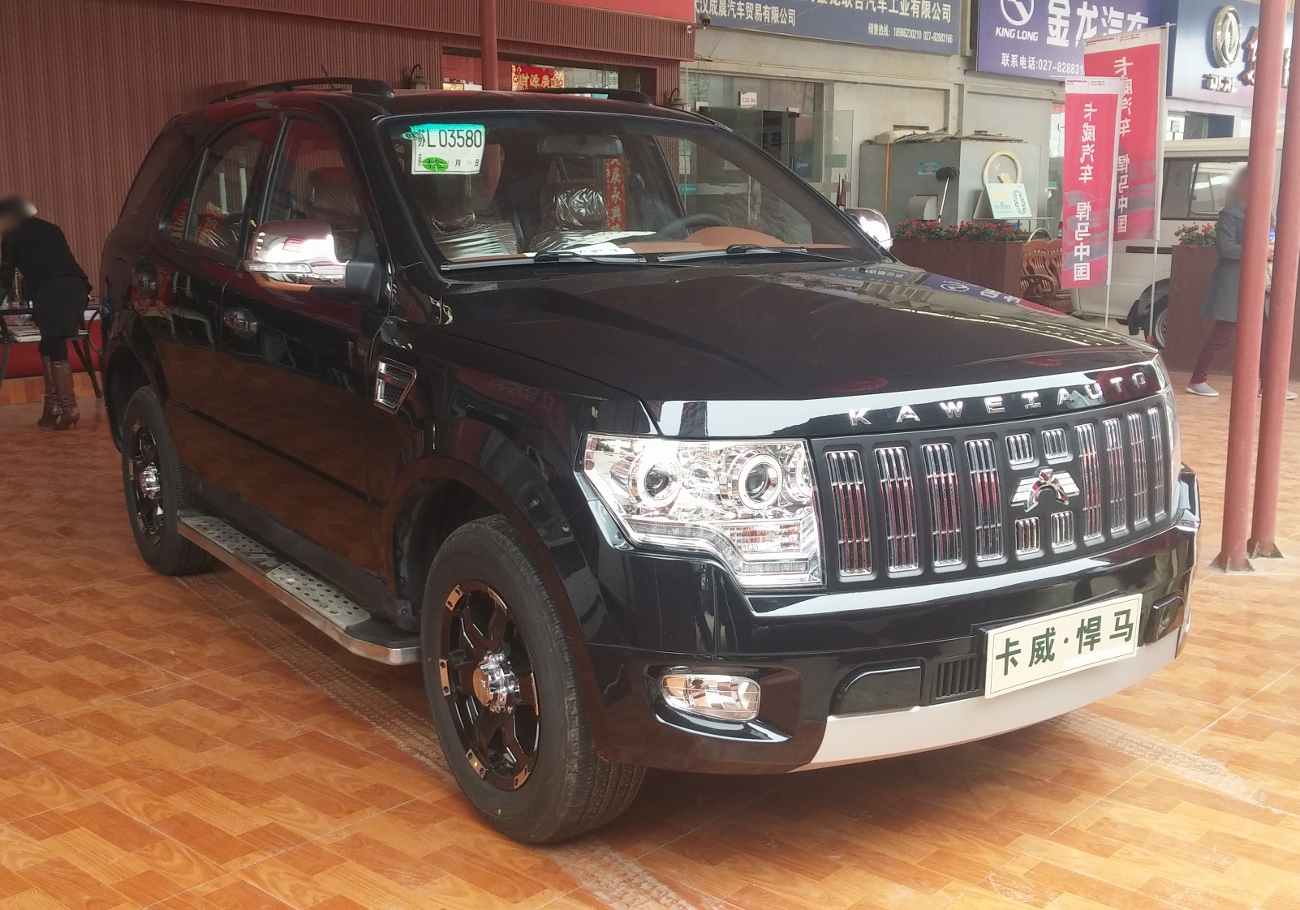
Kawei W1

=== Electric vehicles ===
- Kawei EV1
- Kawei EV4
- Kawei EV5
- Kawei EV7
- Kawei Elfin
- Hummer HX electric
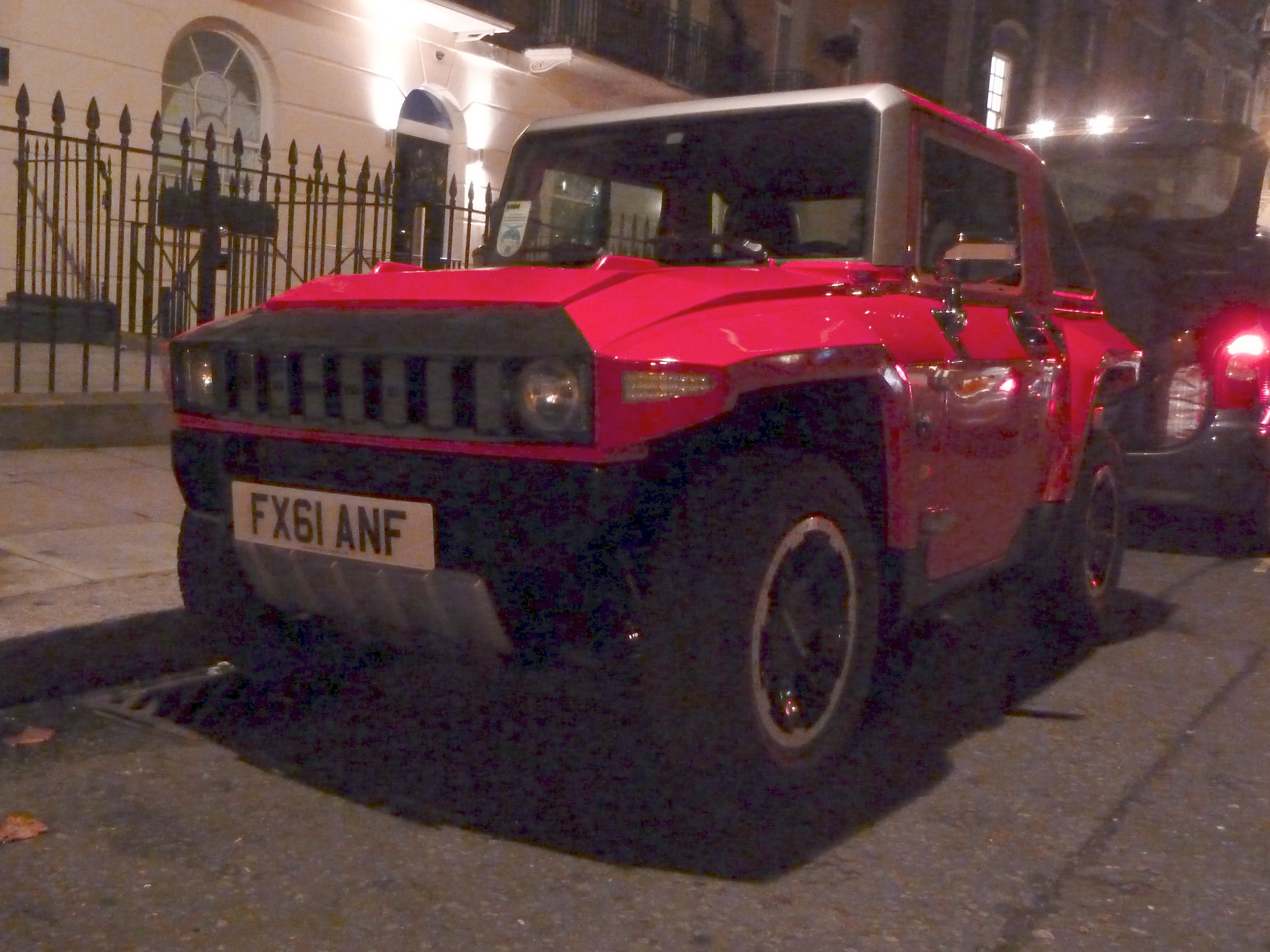
Hummer HX electric
