= V7 =

V7 may refer to:

== Electronics ==
- Vivo V7, a smartphone by Vivo

== Science and technology ==
=== Chemicals ===
- ATC code V07 All other non-therapeutic products, a subgroup of the Anatomical Therapeutic Chemical Classification System

=== Communications ===
- ITU-T V.7, a telecommunications recommendation
- S̅O̅S̅, also sent as V̅7̅

=== Computing ===
- Version 7 Unix, a reference to the seventh edition of Research Unix from 1979
- UNIX V7, a brand mark by The Open Group for compliance with the Single UNIX Specification, Version 4 (SUSv4)

== Transportation ==
=== Automobiles ===
- Brilliance V7, a Chinese mid-size SUV
- Changan Alsvin V7, a Chinese subcompact sedan
- Hanteng V7, a Chinese mid-size MPV
- JAC V7, a Chinese mid-size pickup truck
- Luxgen V7, a Taiwanese minivan

=== Aviation ===
- Volotea, by IATA code

=== Motorcycles ===
- Moto Guzzi V7, an Italian motorcycle

== Other ==
- V7 (political alliance), a political alliance in Suriname
- Video Seven, defunct graphics card manufacturer in the United States
- V-7 Navy College Training Program, within the United States Naval Reserve Midshipmen's School during 1940–1945
- The Marshall Islands, by ITU callsign prefix
- V^{7}, notation for a major-minor dominant seventh chord built on the fifth degree

== See also ==
- 7V (disambiguation)
