= T8 =

T8 or T-8 may refer to the following:

== Measurement ==
- T8, a Torx screwhead size
- T8, a 1 inch fluorescent lamp size
- A tornado intensity rating on the TORRO scale

== Biology ==
- The 8th thoracic vertebra
- The T8 spinal nerve

== Transportation ==
- Trikke8, a scooter-like vehicle
- An OS T1000 train class model, used on the Oslo Metro
- T8 Airport & South Line, a rail service in Sydney, Australia
- Île-de-France tramway Line 8, one of the Tramways in Île-de-France
- T8 road (Tanzania), a road in Tanzania
- JAC Shuailing T8, a Chinese mid-size pickup truck

== Other ==
- One of the Hong Kong Tropical Cyclone Warning Signals used by the Hong Kong Observatory
- Numeronym of “Tate”, nickname of Canadian singer Tate McRae
- Tekken 8, a 2024 video game
- The International Telecommunication Union prefix for Palau
- YouTube Channel based on The Lion King

== See also ==
- 8T (disambiguation)
