= Water for injection =

Very clean, sterile water

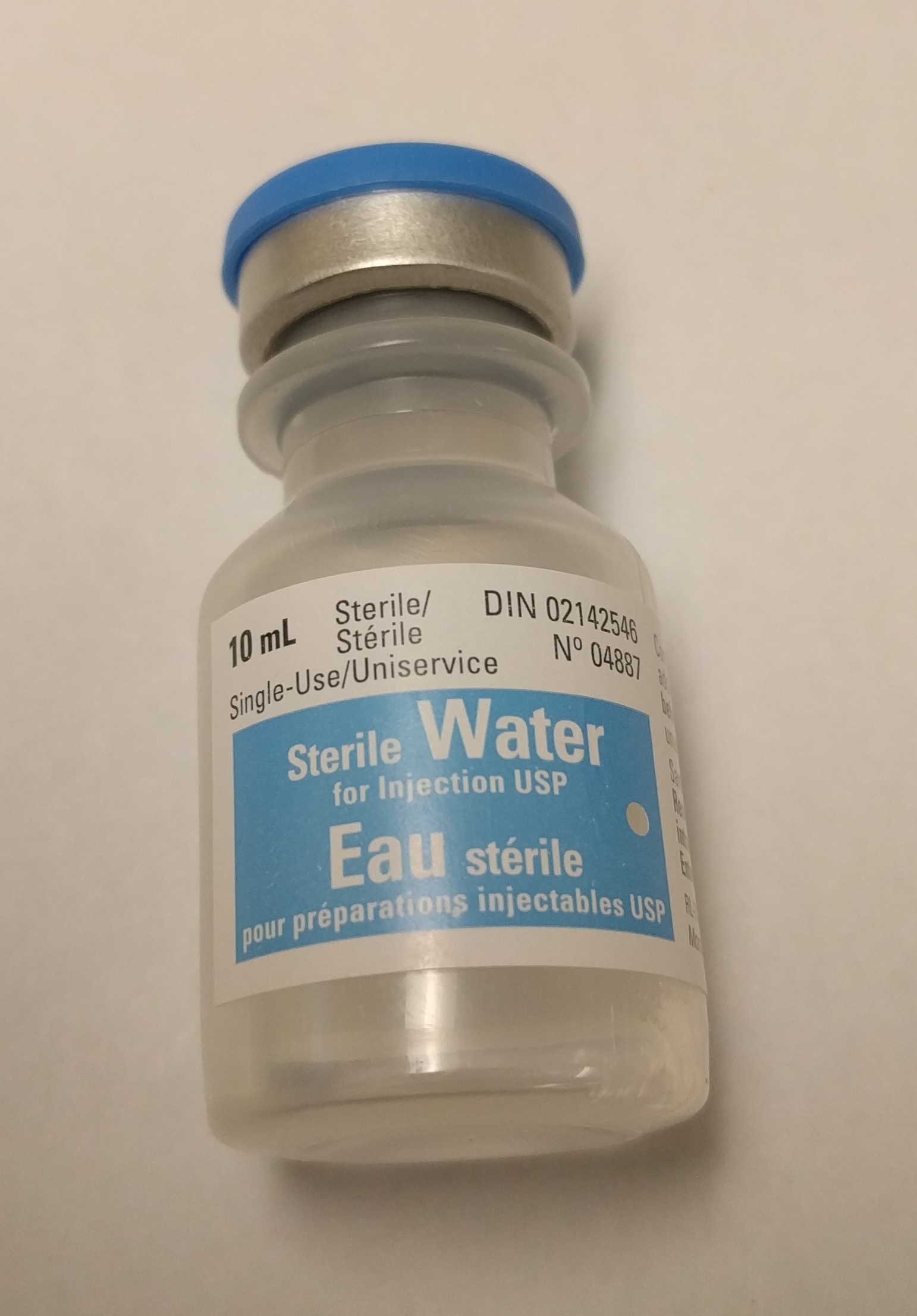
- Sterile water for injection

Clinical data
- AHFS/Drugs.com: FDA Professional Drug Information
- License data: US DailyMed: Water_for_injection
- ATC code: V07AB (WHO)

Identifiers
- CAS Number: 7732-18-5
- ChemSpider: 937
- UNII: 059QF0KO0R

Chemical and physical data
- Formula: H_{2}O

Water for injection is water of extra high quality without significant contamination. A sterile version is used for making solutions that will be given by injection. Before such use other substances generally must be added to make the solution isotonic. Isotonic solutions containing water for injection can be given by injection into a vein, muscle, or under the skin. A non-sterile version may be used in manufacturing with sterilization occurring later in the production process.

== Side effects and mechanisms ==
The primary use of sterile water for injection is as an ingredient for dilution of other medications (aseptic preparation of parenteral solutions). If it is given by injection into a vein without making it approximately isotonic, breakdown of red blood cells may occur. This can then result in kidney problems. Excessive amount may also result in fluid overload. Water for injection is generally made by distillation or reverse osmosis. It should contain less than a mg of elements other than water per 100 ml. Versions with agents that stop bacterial growth are also available.

In the UK, some hospitals offer subcutaneous injections of water directly for treating back pain in labour. It is controversial, with some claiming it is pseudoscience. Because sterile water is not isotonic, its injection causes acute pain. One purported mechanism of action is to induce acute local pain to compete directly with diffuse back pain through a mechanism called diffuse noxious inhibitory control; another hypothesis is instead that the acute pain releases endorphins. A review and meta-analysis in 2009 found the benefits of its use inconclusive.

== History and culture ==
It is on the World Health Organization's List of Essential Medicines. Water for injection is available over the counter in the United States.

== Other names ==
Water for injection is also known as aqua ad iniectabilia or aqua ad injectionem.
