= JAC T9 Ute =

Pickup truck

JAC Hunter
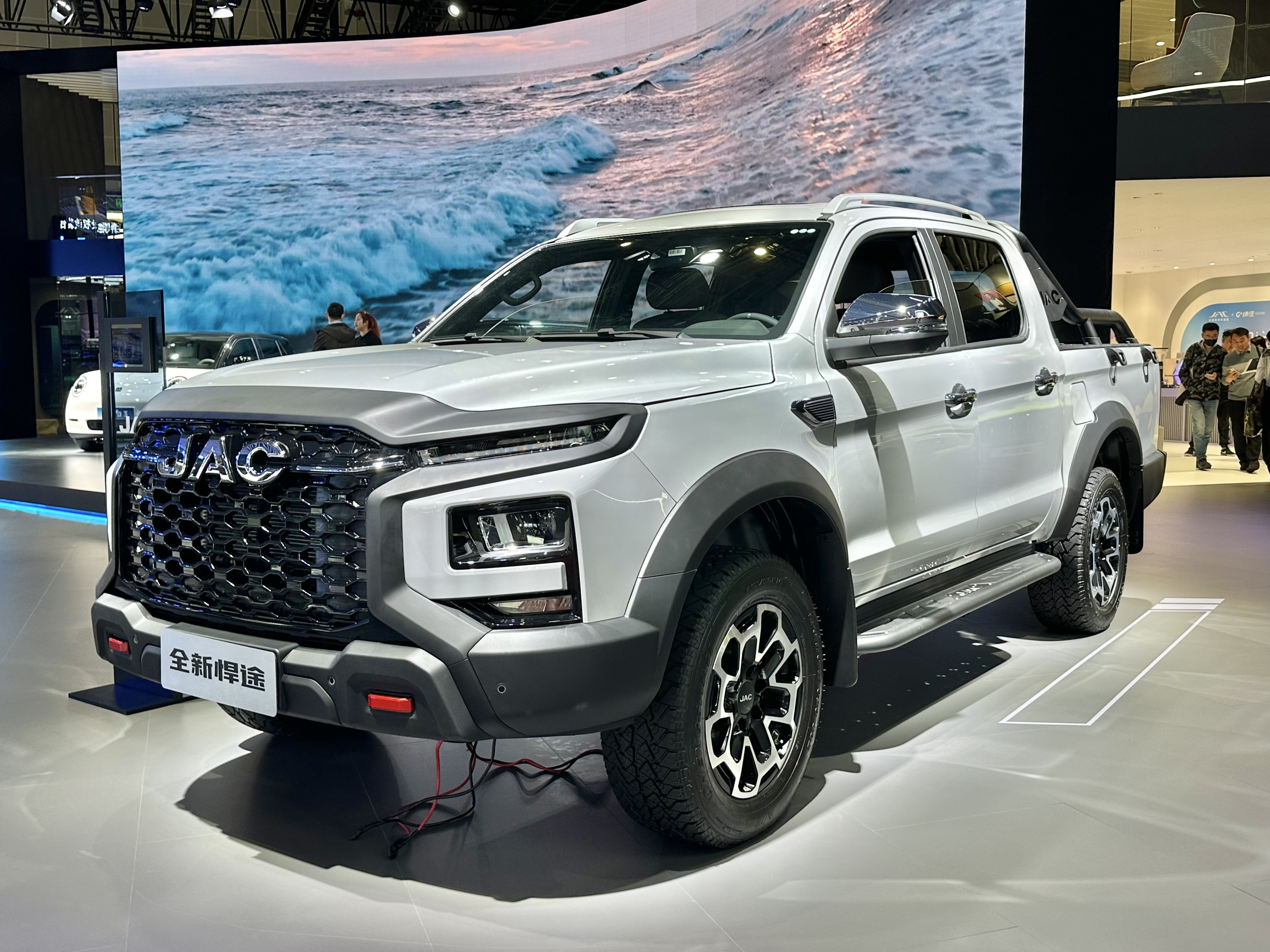
- 2023 JAC Hunter

Overview
- Manufacturer: JAC Group
- Also called: JAC T9 Ute (Australia); JAC Hunter PHEV (Australia); ICH-X K4 (Italy); KMC T9 (Iran); JAC T9 Hunter (Pakistan); Sollers ST9 (Russia)
- Production: 2020–present
- Assembly: China: Nanchang, Jiangxi; Pakistan: Karachi (Ghandhara)

Body and chassis
- Class: Mid-size pickup truck
- Body style: 4-door pickup truck; 4-door cab chassis
- Layout: Front-engine, rear-wheel-drive or four-wheel-drive
- Platform: JAC 3rd generation pickup platform
- Related: JAC Shuailing T6; JAC Shuailing T8

Powertrain
- Engine: 2.0 L 4DB2-2D1 I4 turbo diesel; 2.0 L 4DB2-2E I4 turbo diesel; 2.4 L 4K22D4T I4 turbo petrol; 2.0 L D20TG I4 turbo petrol
- Power output: 156 kW (209 hp) (T9 Hunter 2.4 L Turbo Petrol); 165 kW (221 hp) (T9 Hunter 2.0 L Turbo Petrol); 125 kW (168 hp) (T9 Hunter 2.0 L Turbo Diesel); 150 kW (201 hp) (T9 Hunter EV); 290 kW (389 hp) (T9 PHEV); 360 kW (483 hp) (Hunter PHEV)
- Transmission: 6-speed manual; 8-speed ZF 8HP50 automatic
- Battery: 77 kWh CATL LFP (T9 EV); 88.02 kWh CATL LFP (T9 EV)
- Plug-in charging: V2L: 15 kW (Hunter PHEV); 77 kW DC (T9 Hunter EV); 11 kW AC (T9 Hunter EV)

Dimensions
- Wheelbase: 3,110 mm (122.4 in); 3,400 mm (133.9 in)
- Length: 5,330 mm (209.8 in); 5,620 mm (221.3 in)
- Width: 1,965 mm (77.4 in)
- Height: 1,920 mm (75.6 in)
- Curb weight: 2,055 kg (4,530.5 lb)

The JAC T9 Ute, called the JAC Hunter (Chinese: 悍途) in China is a mid-size pickup truck produced by JAC Group.

== Overview ==
The JAC T9 Ute was first unveiled during the 2020 Beijing Auto Show in October 2020, and was launched in the Chinese market in January 2021,

A total of two engine options are available for the 2021 JAC T9 Ute in the Chinese Market, including the 2.0-liter turbo inline-4 diesel engine shared with the JAC T8 putting out 150 hp (110 kW; 150 PS) and 360 N⋅m (270 lb⋅ft) of torque, and a 2.4-liter turbo petrol inline-4 engine producing 211 hp (157 kW; 214 PS). All models come exclusively with a six-speed manual transmission. It's also available in both 4x2 and 4x4 configurations.

A Bobcat Edition was introduced in 2022, and shortly after, a Green Demon Edition was also introduced for 2022. Both special editions include upgrades featuring modified appearance and off-road kits. The performance upgrades include rear competitive bars, wading hose pipes, chassis guards, and an electric 9500-pound winch.

Being based on the same platform as the T6 and T8, the JAC T9 Ute has a pickup bed with similar dimensions of 1,520 mm × 1,590 mm × 470 mm (60 in × 63 in × 19 in) and a LWB version in a size of 1,810 mm × 1,590 mm × 470 mm (71 in × 63 in × 19 in) offering higher load capacity.

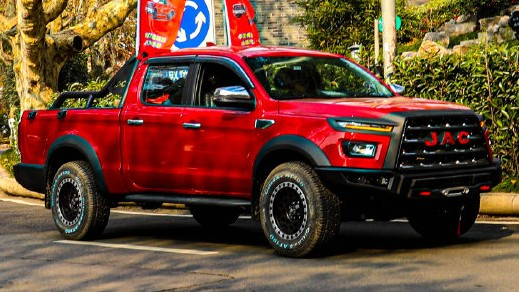
2021 JAC Hunter

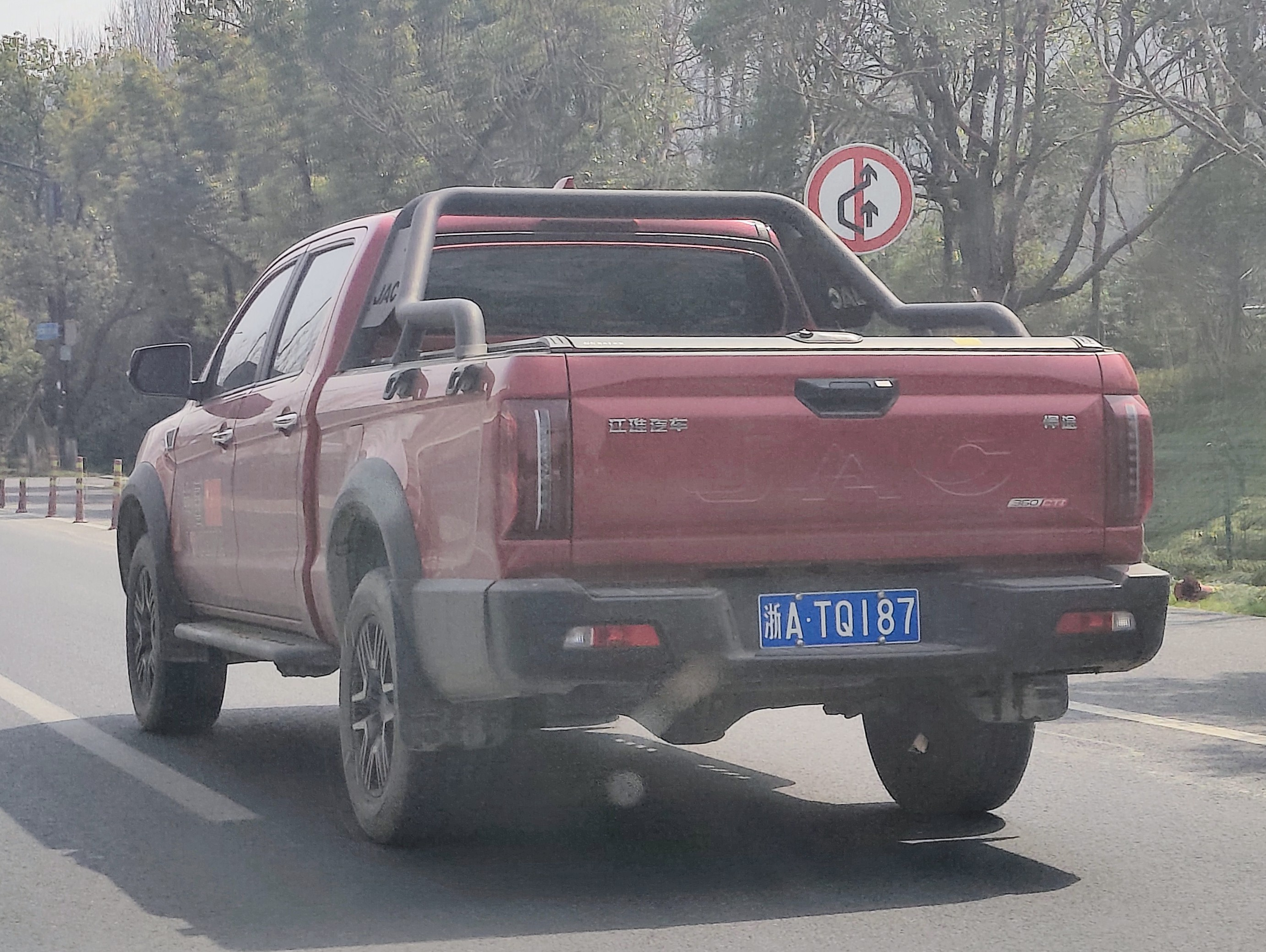
Rear view

=== 2023 facelift ===
The JAC T9 Ute received a facelift for the 2023 model year. The updated model is now powered by a Blue Whale power 2.0-liter turbocharged engine producing 170 kW (230 hp; 230 PS) and 380 N⋅m (280 lb⋅ft) of torque. The diesel version is powered by a 2.0-liter turbo engine developing 125 kW (168 hp; 170 PS) and 410 N⋅m (300 lb⋅ft) of torque. An additional 8-speed automatic transmission is now available from 2023.

At the end of 2024, the T9 EV electric model was introduced with a new 88.02 kWh LFP battery, paired with a dual electric motor producing 220 kW (160 kW rear and 70 kW front) and all-wheel drive. The maximum torque is 516 Nm. The declared range under the WLTP cycle is 330 km. The claimed performance is 0–100 km/h in 8.4 seconds and a top speed of 140 km/h.

In 2025 JAC Motors introduced its first plug-in hybrid pick-up in the market: the T9 Hunter 2.0L TGDI PHEV. This model combines a 2.0-liter turbocharged petrol engine 160 kW (210 hp; 220 PS) and 370 N⋅m (273 lb⋅ft) with two permanent-magnet electric motors and a 4-speed DHT transmission. The front motor delivers 60 kW (80 hp; 82 PS), 130 kW (170 hp; 180 PS) peak and 150 N⋅m (111 lb⋅ft) peak, while the rear unit adds 70 kW (94 hp; 95 PS), 150 kW (201 hp; 204 PS) peak and 150 N⋅m (111 lb⋅ft), 340 N⋅m (251 lb⋅ft) peak, for a total system output of 290 kW (389 hp; 394 PS) and 670 N⋅m (494 lb⋅ft). Power comes from a 31.2 kWh lithium-iron-phosphate battery (87 Ah) that supports CCS2 charging. Using DC fast charging, it reaches 100 percent in about 1 hour and 25 minutes; on a standard AC home charger, a full charge takes roughly 4 hours and 30 minutes. In terms of safety and driver assistance, the T9 PHEV features lane departure warning, rear cross-traffic alert, forward collision warning, traffic-sign recognition and a driver-monitoring system. Its chassis includes a rigid multi-link rear axle with electronic differential locks on both axles, and it can tow up to 3,500 kg.

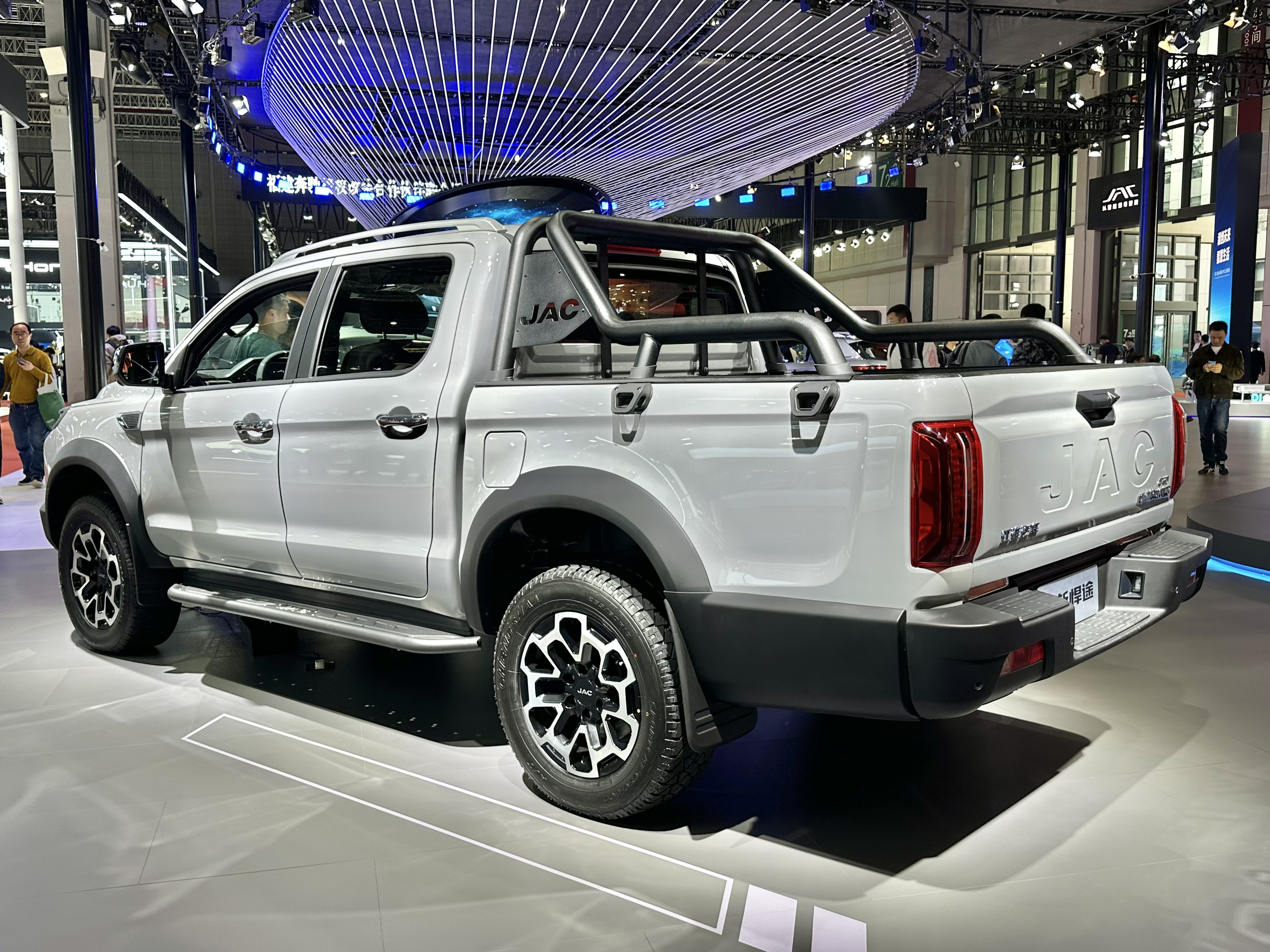
Rear view

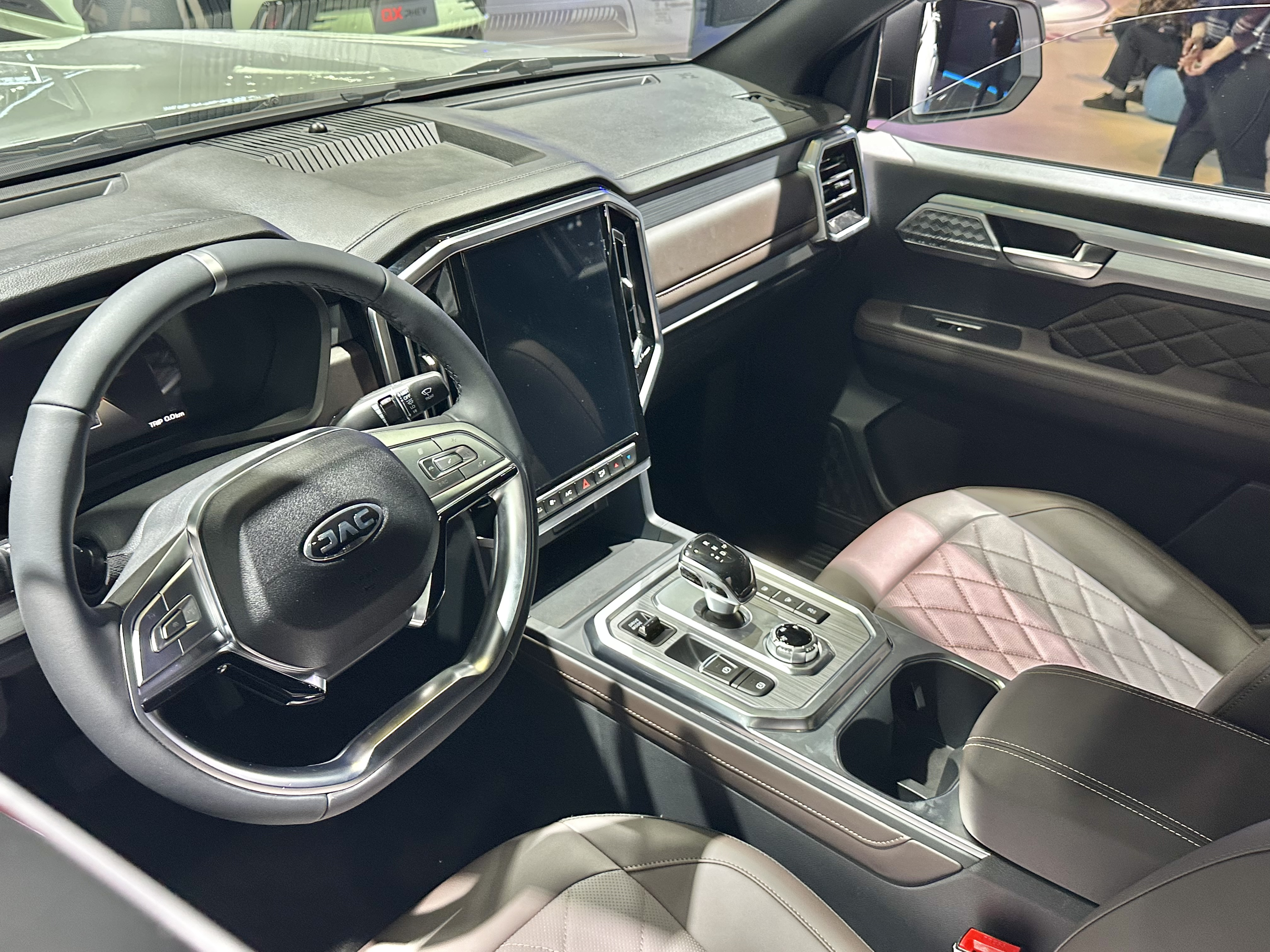
Interior

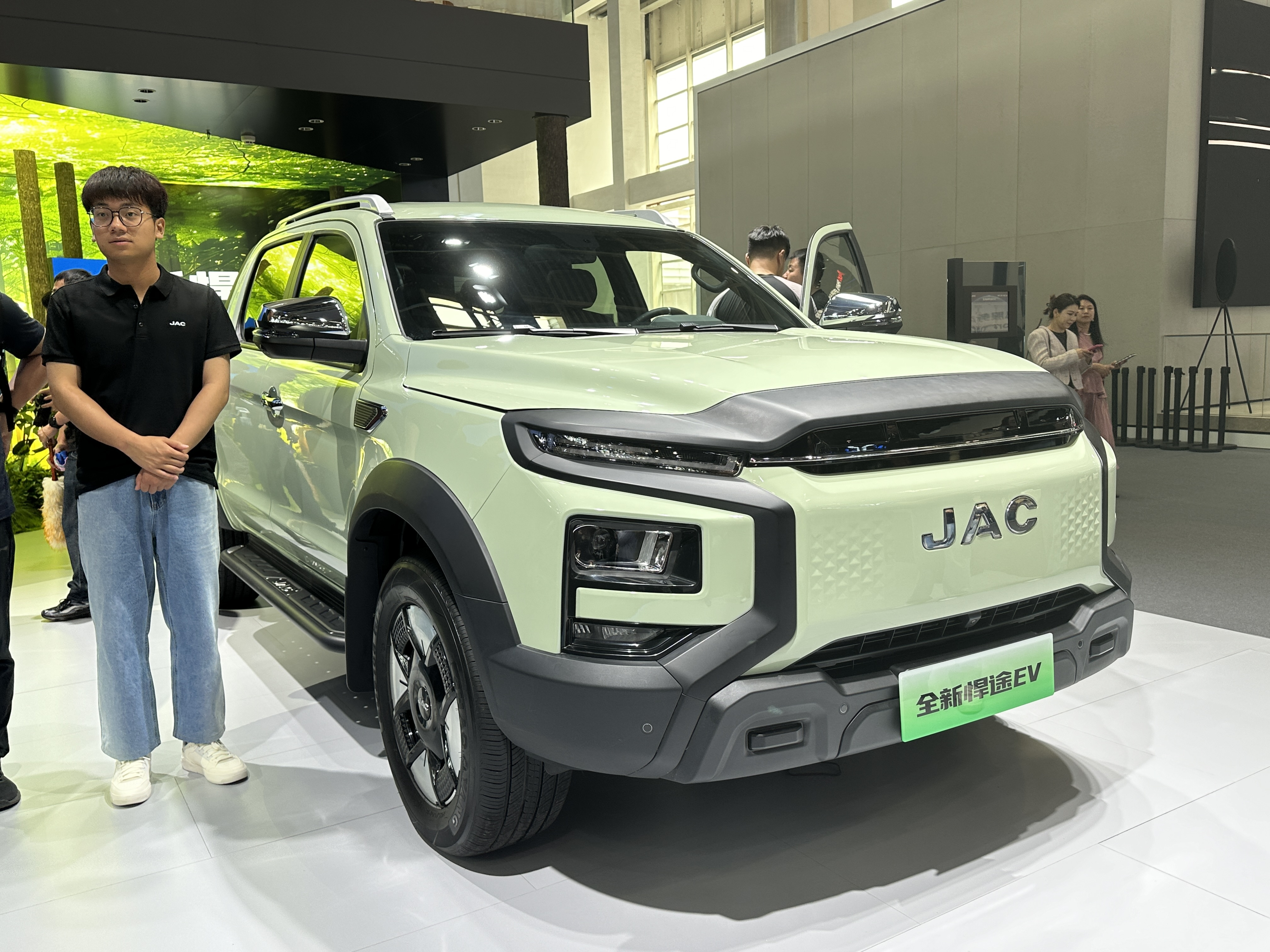
JAC Hunter EV

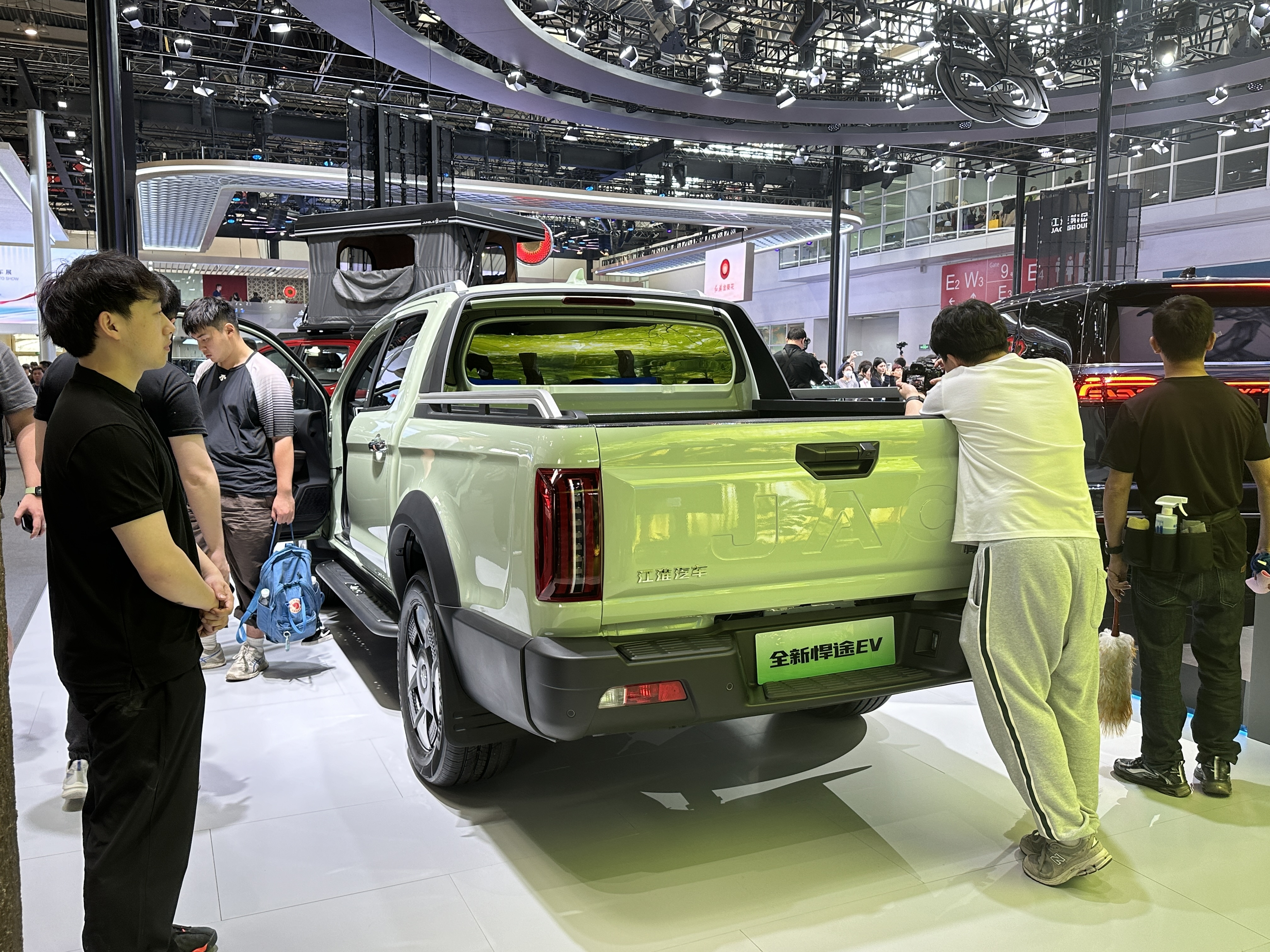
Rear view

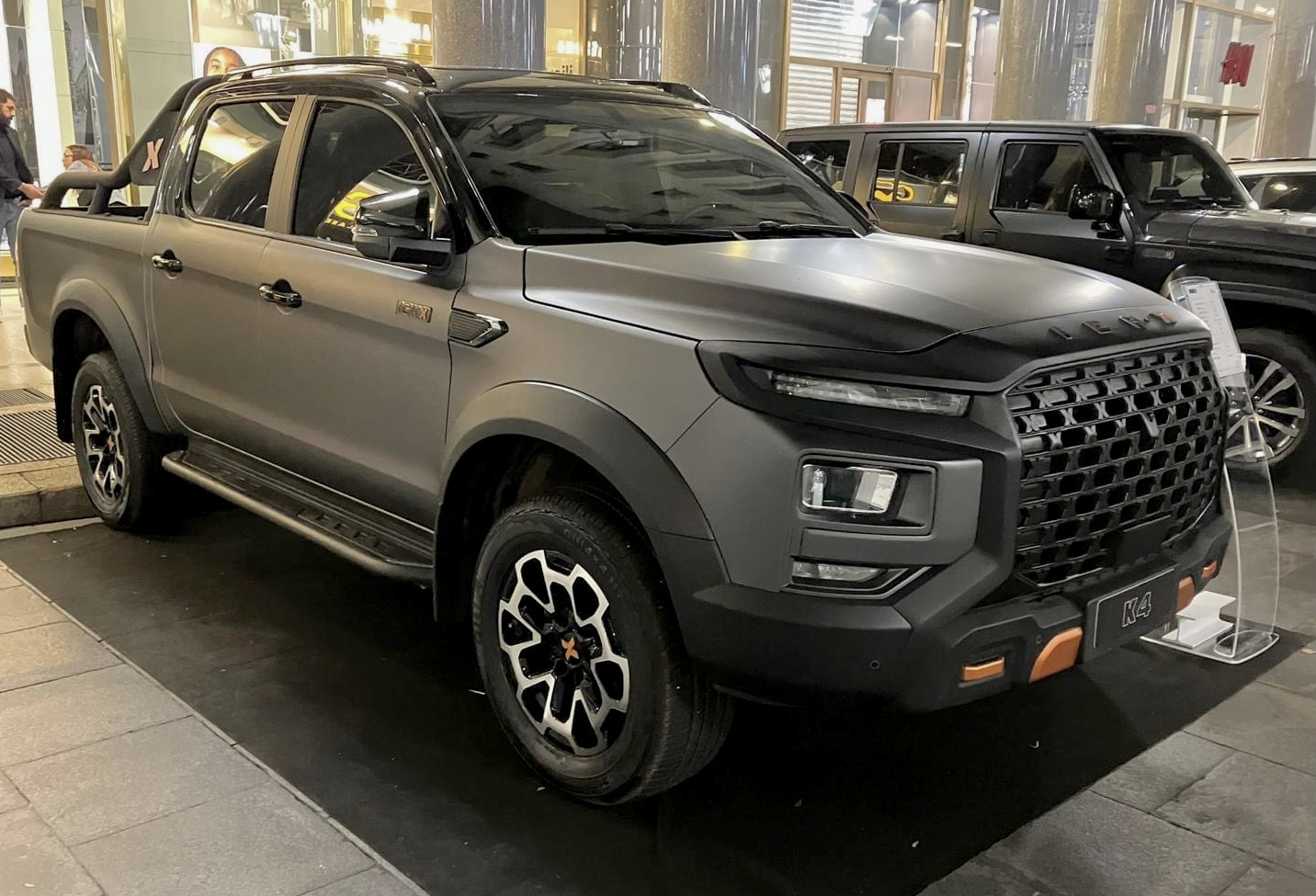
ICH-X K4 (Italy)

== Markets ==
=== Oceania ===
==== Australia and New Zealand ====
JAC has introduced a turbo-diesel version of the T9 Ute to Australia and New Zealand in mid 2024, with two variants: Oasis, and Haven. The diesel version T9 Ute is powered by a 2.0-liter turbo four-cylinder engine making 125 kW (168 hp; 170 PS) and 410 N⋅m (302 lb⋅ft) of torque, with the engine mated to an 8-speed automatic transmission. For the interior, the T9 Ute features heated seats, a 10.4-inch center touchscreen, active cruise control, wireless charging, and a 360 degree parking camera system. The towing capacity is 3,500 kg (7,700 lb). in December 2025 the Oasis cab chassis, and Osprey released, in April 2025 the Tradepro cab chassis released, as the entry level variant.

The JAC Hunter PHEV will release in Australia in mid-2026, with dual motors and a 2.0-liter turbo four-cylinder engine making a combined 360 kW (483 hp; 489 PS) and 1,010 N⋅m (745 lb⋅ft) of torque, with a NEDC electric only range of 100 km (62 mi), and 1,005 km (624 mi) combined range.

=== South America ===
==== Argentina ====
JAC T9 was launched in Argentina on 18 November 2025 in manual and automatic transmission.

==== Brazil ====
JAC Hunter will arrive in Brazil in September 2024.

=== Asia ===
==== Pakistan ====
On January 8, 2025, Ghandhara Automobiles introduced the JAC T9 pickup to the Pakistani market. Under its hood sits a single diesel engine that delivers 125 kW (168 hp; 170 PS) and 410 N⋅m (302 lb⋅ft) of torque, paired with an 8-speed automatic gearbox and able to reach a top speed of 150 km/h. With a fuel average of 10 km/L and a 76 L tank, the T9 is as efficient as it is capable. Its equipment list includes: 18-inch alloy wheels, a 10.4-inch touchscreen infotainment system, 360 degree-view cameras, auto-dimming rearview mirror, rain-sensing wipers, power windows, a sunroof (the first offered on a pickup truck in Pakistan), rear AC vents and heated front seats.

Safety is comprehensive, with six SRS airbags and electronic aids such as ABS with EBD and BOS, Hill-Hold Control, Hill-Braking Assist, Traction Control, Vehicle Dynamic Control, Electronic Stability Control and Tyre Pressure Monitoring. The range-topping JAC T9 Hunter carries a sticker price of PKR 9.75 million.

== Safety ==
ANCAP test results JAC T9 (2024, aligned with Euro NCAP)
Test	Points	%
Overall:	5 /5 stars	
Adult occupant:	34.29	85%
Child occupant:	43	87%
Pedestrian:	54.93	87%
Safety assist:	16.15	89%

ANCAP test results JAC Hunter (2024, aligned with Euro NCAP)
Test	Points	%
Overall:	5 /5 stars	
Adult occupant:	34.29	85%
Child occupant:	43	87%
Pedestrian:	54.93	87%
Safety assist:	16.15	89%

== Sales ==
Year	Australia
2025	1,582
