= 8T =

8T or 8-T may refer to:

- 8T, IATA code for Air Tindi
- Mi-8T; see Mil Mi-8
- FDL-8T; see List of GE reciprocating engines
- Line 8T; see Batong Line, Beijing Subway
- YF9F-8T; see Grumman F-9 Cougar
- J-8T; see Shenyang J-8
- Typ 8T, internal designation for Audi A5
- OnePlus 8T, an Android smartphone

== See also ==
- T8 (disambiguation)
