= Brilliance V6 =

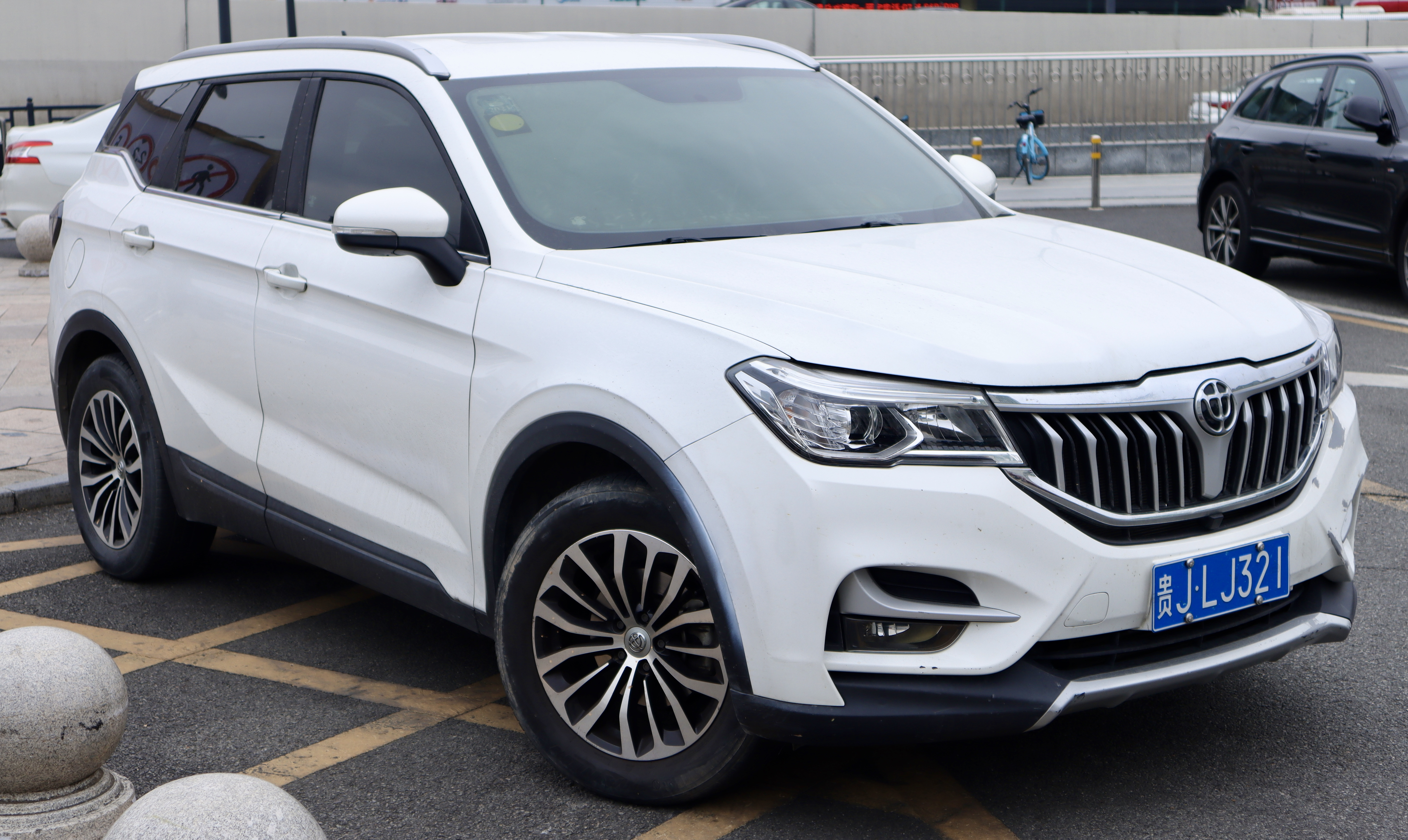
- Front view

Overview
- Manufacturer: Brilliance Auto
- Production: 2017–2020
- Model years: 2018–2020
- Designer: Icona

Body and chassis
- Class: mid-size CUV
- Body style: 5-door crossover
- Layout: Front-engine, front-wheel-drive
- Related: Brilliance V7

Powertrain
- Engine: 1.5 L turbo I4
- Transmission: 6-speed manual; 6-speed automatic; 7-speed DCT

Dimensions
- Wheelbase: 2,725 mm (107.3 in)
- Length: 4,620 mm (181.9 in)
- Width: 1,922 mm (75.7 in)
- Height: 1,727–1,734 mm (68.0–68.3 in)
- Curb weight: 1,480–1,600 kg (3,263–3,527 lb)

The Brilliance V6 is a Mid-size CUV produced by Brilliance Auto under the Zhonghua brand. The Brilliance V6 was unveiled on the 2017 Guangzhou Auto Show in China. The Brilliance V6 is a five-seater CUV, and the seven-seater called the Brilliance V7 was launched later during the 2018 Beijing Auto Show.

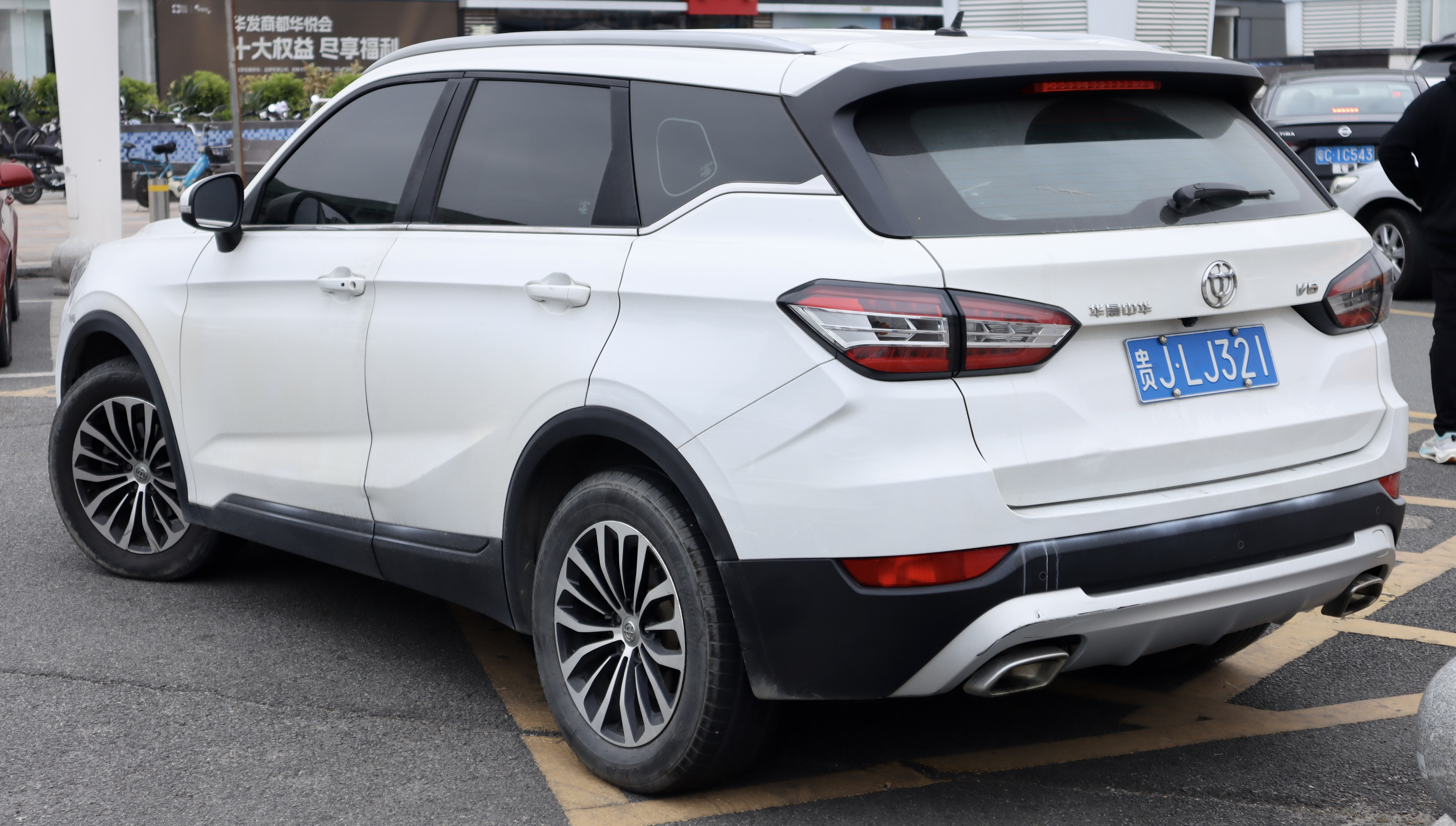
Rear view
