= 7V =

7V or 7-V may refer to:

- 7V, IATA code for Pelican Air
- 7v, abbreviations for 7 volts
- 7V, abbreviation for 7-valve engine
- Force 7V, a model of Leyland P76
- UP-7V, sighting device used on the RPG-7
- Yak-7V, a model of Yakovlev Yak-7
- TBG-7V, fragmentation rocket for Rocket-propelled grenade
- OG-7V, fragmentation rocket for Rocket-propelled grenade

== See also ==
- V7 (disambiguation)
