= JAC Shuailing T8 =

Chinese pickup truck

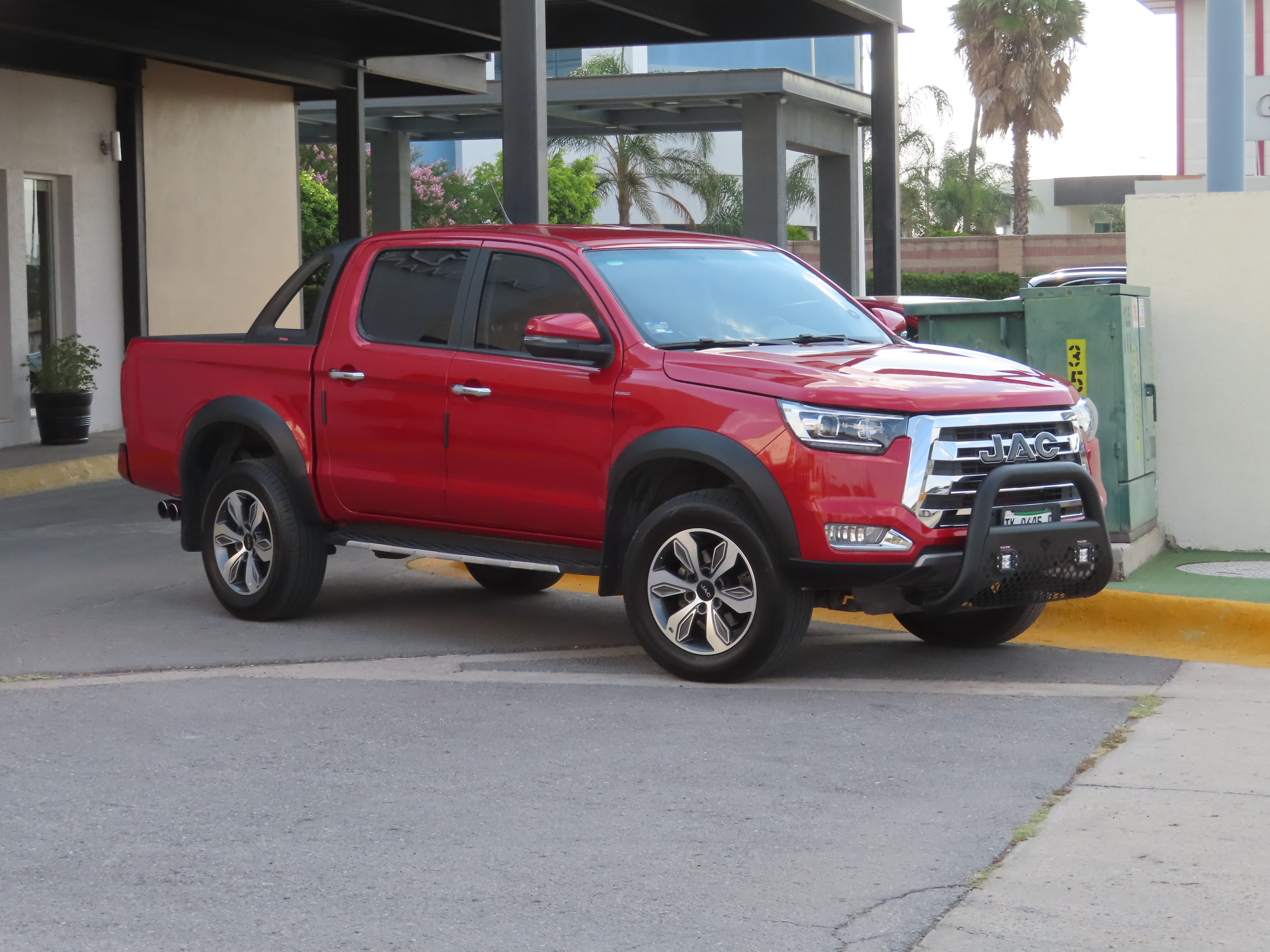

Overview
- Manufacturer: JAC Motors
- Also called: JAC T8; JAC Frison T8 (Mexico); KMC T8 (Iran); DR PK8 (Italy); EVO Cross 4 (Italy); Cirelli 8 (Italy; 2023-2024); Sollers ST8 (Russia); JAC T8 by Thai EV (Thailand); Higer T8
- Production: 2018–present
- Assembly: Nanchang, Jiangxi, China; Kerman Motors, Kerman, Iran; Thai EV, Samut prakarn, Thailand; Ulyanovsk, Russia (as Sollers ST8)

Body and chassis
- Class: Mid-size pickup truck
- Body style: 4-door double cab
- Layout: Front-engine, rear-wheel-drive or four-wheel-drive
- Related: JAC Shuailing T6; JAC Hunter; JAC V7

Powertrain
- Engine: 2.0 L 4DB2-1D1 I4 turbo diesel 2.0 L 4DB2-2E I4 turbo diesel 2.8 L JE493ZLQ6E I4 turbo diesel 2.0 L LJ481Q6 I4 petrol 2.0 L 4GA3-4D I4 turbo petrol 2.4 L 4K22D4T I4 turbo petrol
- Transmission: 6-speed manual 8-speed automatic

Dimensions
- Wheelbase: 3,090–3,380 mm (121.7–133.1 in)
- Length: 5,325–5,645 mm (209.6–222.2 in)
- Width: 1,880 mm (74.0 in)
- Height: 1,830 mm (72.0 in)

Chronology
- Predecessor: JAC Shuailing

The JAC Shuailing T8 (帅铃T8) is a mid-size pickup truck produced by JAC Motors for the Chinese market.

== Overview ==
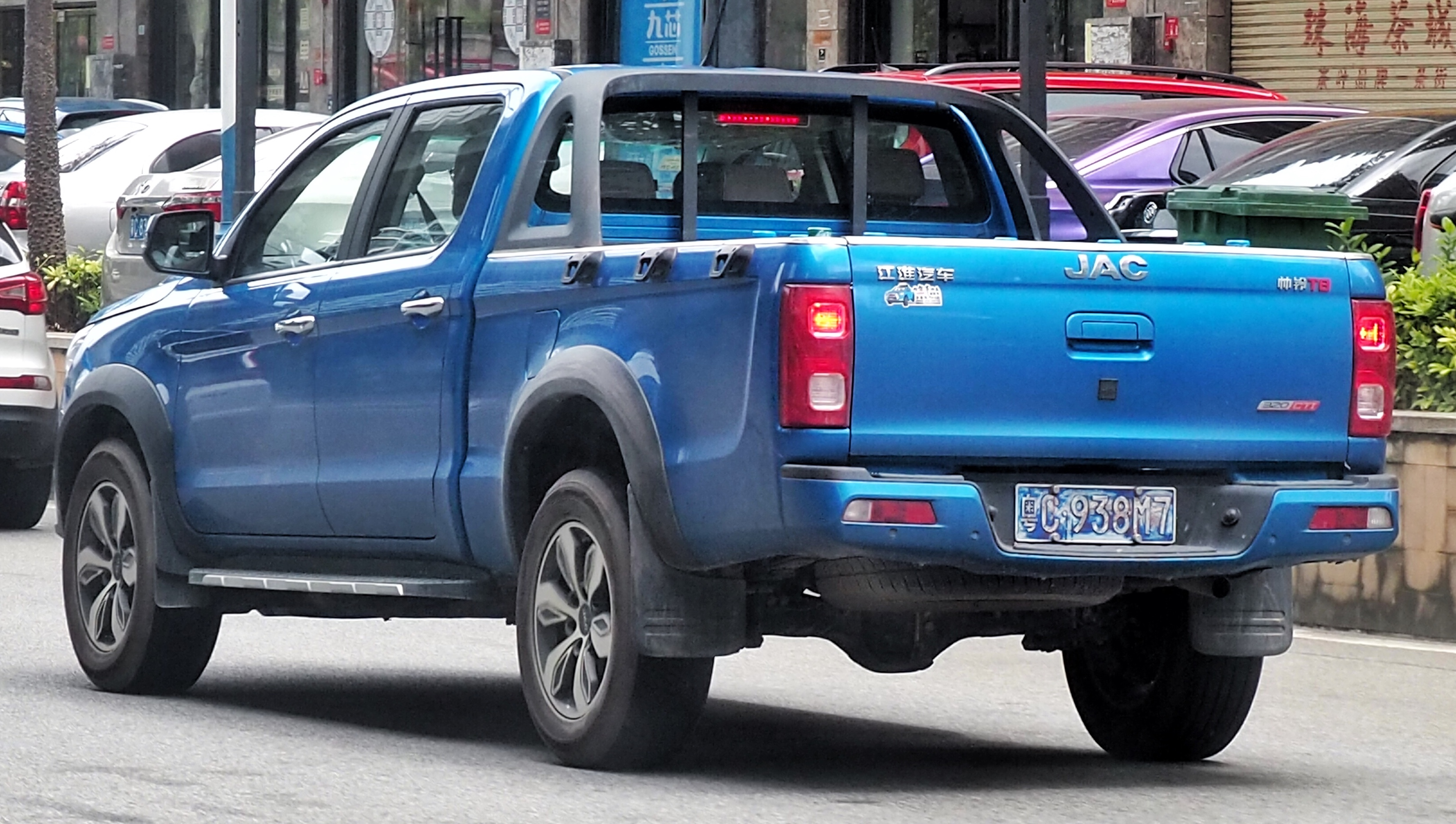
JAC Shuailing T8 (rear)

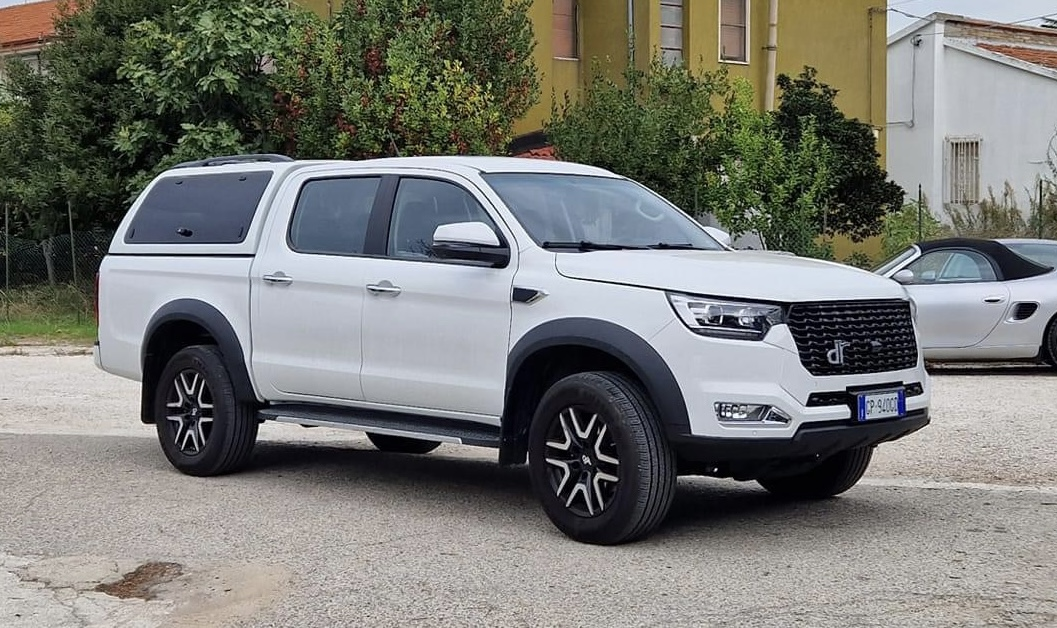
DR PK8

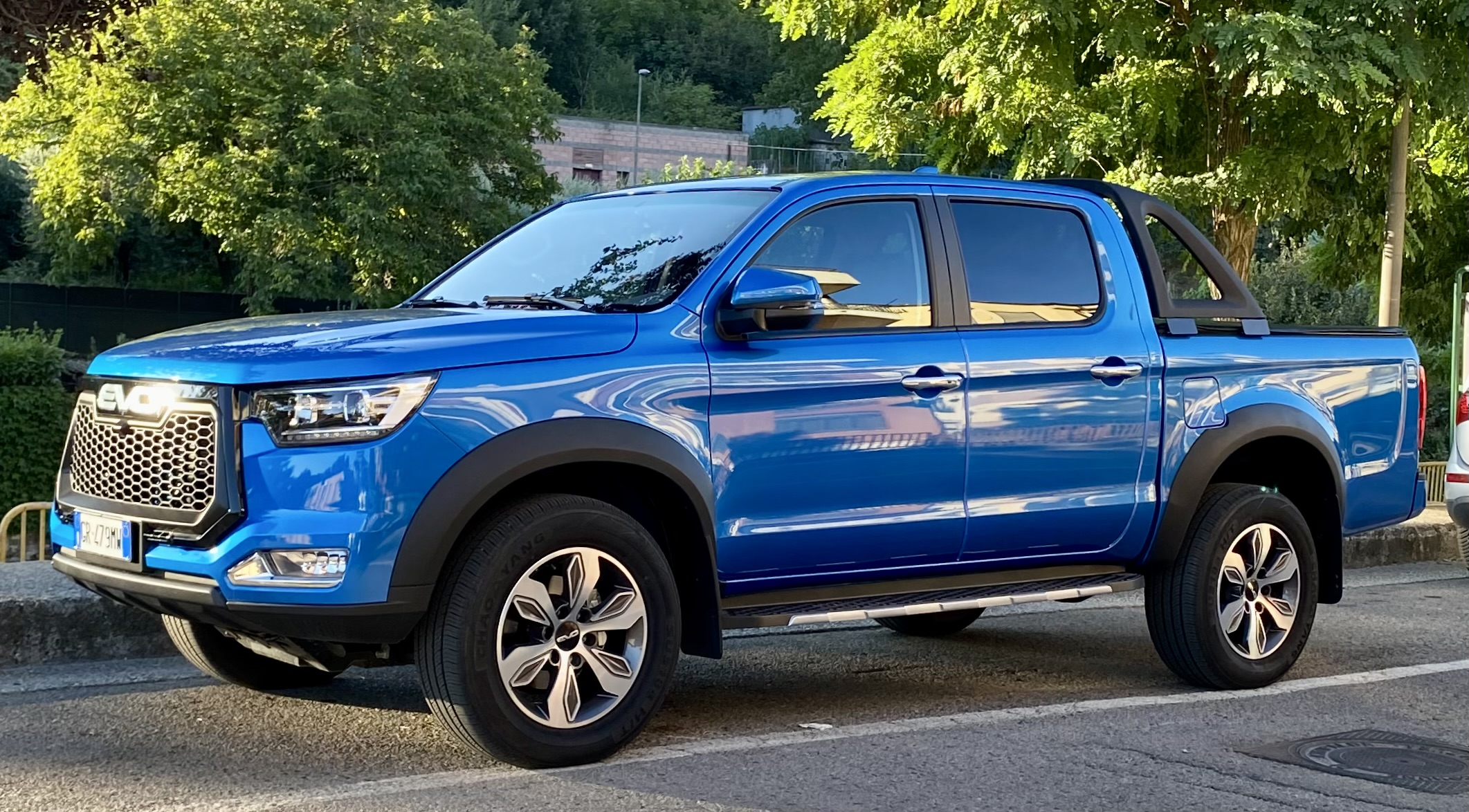
EVO Cross 4

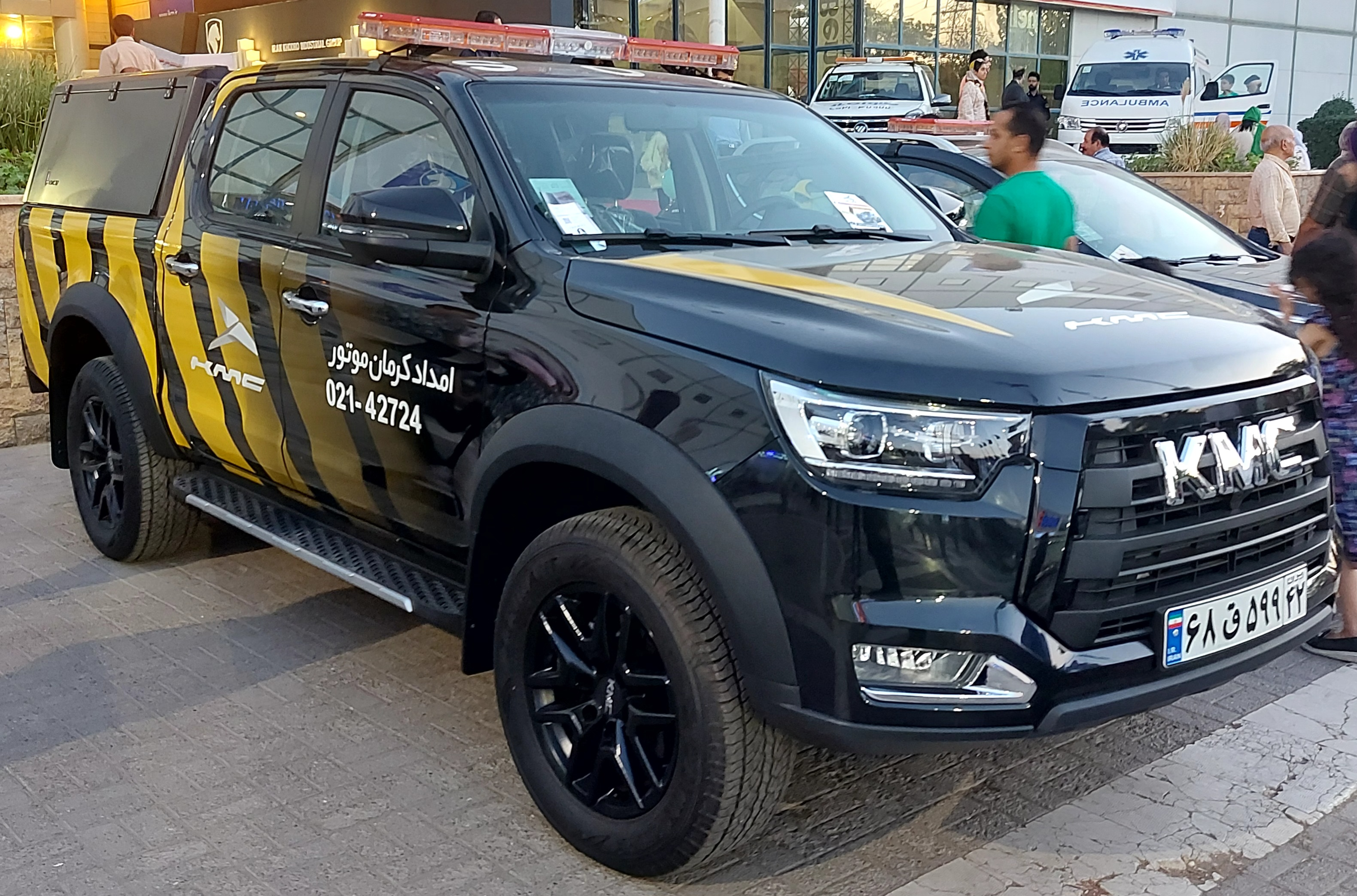
KMC T8

The JAC Shuailing T8 pickup was launched in the Chinese market in 2018.

A total of three engine options are available for the 2020 JAC T8 in the Chinese Market, including the 2.0 liter CTI turbo inline-4 diesel putting out 138 PS (101 kW; 136 hp) at 3600 rpm along with 320 N⋅m (236 lb⋅ft) of torque at 1600 - 2600 rpm, a 2.0 liter turbo inline-4 gasoline engine which produces 190 PS (140 kW; 187 hp) at 5000 rpm and 290 N⋅m (214 lb⋅ft) of torque at 1800 - 4800 rpm, and a 2.4 liter turbo inline-4 gasoline engine. All models only come with a six-speed manual transmission. It's also available in both 4x2 and 4x4 configurations.

Being based on the same platform as the T6, the Shuailing T8 has a pickup bed with similar dimensions of 1520×1520×470mm and a LWB version in a size of 1810×1520×470mm offering higher load capacity.

Since 2023, the T8 has been exported to Europe and sold by various importers under different names. In Italy, it's marketed by DR Automobiles as the DR PK8 (equivalent to the JAC T8 Pro) and EVO Cross 4 (equivalent to the base version of the JAC T8), both equipped with a 2.0-liter turbo diesel engine producing 136 hp (101 kW). The Cirelli Motor Company also sold it under the name Cirelli 8 Pick-up from 2023 to 2025. In Switzerland, it has been imported and sold under the JAC brand since 2025, featuring a 2.4-liter turbo gasoline engine delivering 204 hp (152 kW).

== Electric version ==
There is an all-electric version of the T8, known as the i3-T330 or T8 EV in the export market, equipped with a 67.2-kWh Lithium iron phosphate battery and a 110 kW electric engine. The declared autonomy is 330 km (NEDC cycle). The name i3-T330 is used for two different electric pickup trucks, one based on the T8 and one based on the older T6.
