= Brilliance V7 =

Chinese automobile

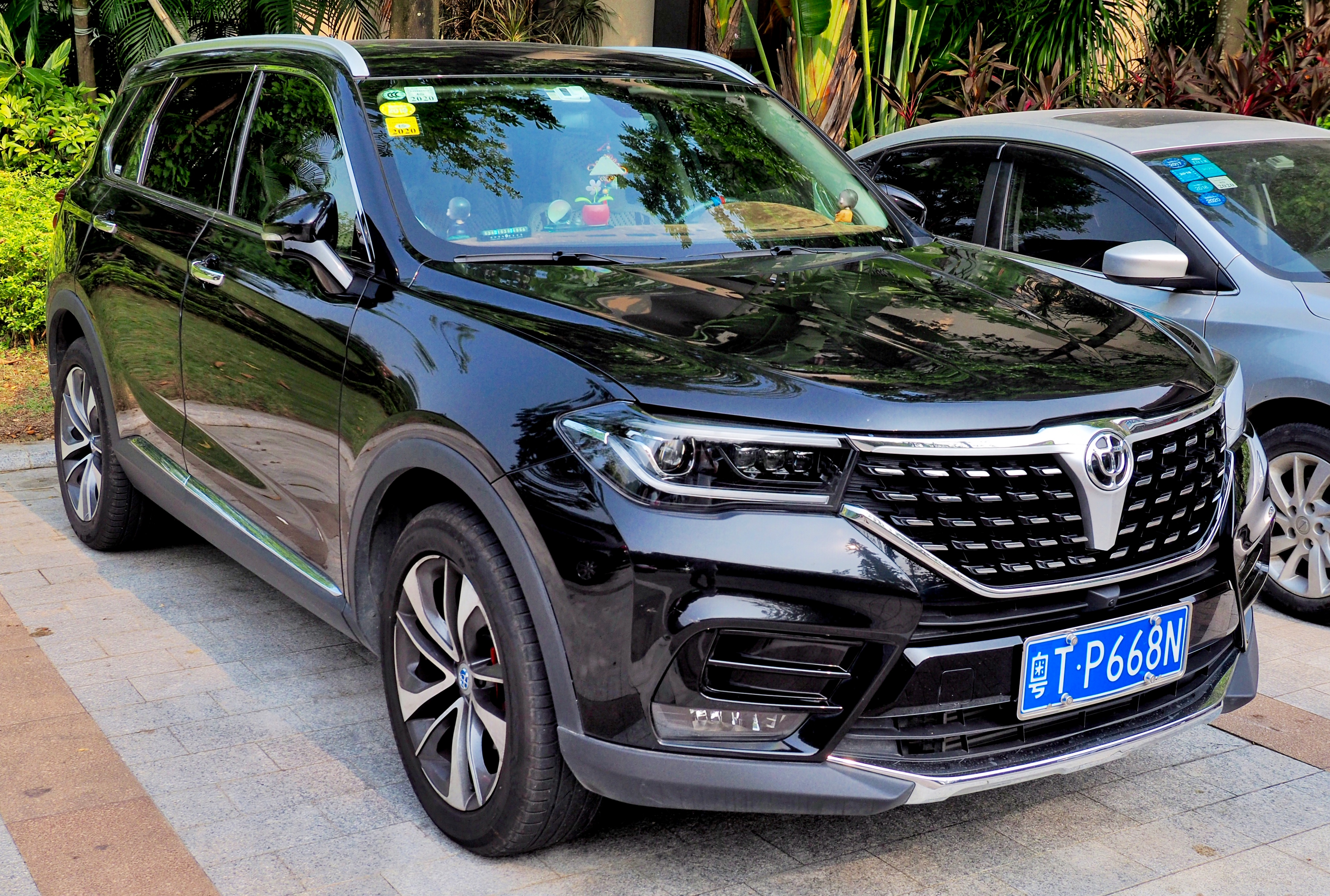

Overview
- Manufacturer: Brilliance Auto
- Production: 2017–2020
- Model years: 2018–2020
- Designer: Yongbao Cai

Body and chassis
- Class: Mid-size CUV
- Body style: 5-door crossover
- Layout: Front-engine, front-wheel-drive
- Related: Brilliance V6

Powertrain
- Engine: 1.8 L turbo I4
- Transmission: 6-speed manual; 7-speed DCT

Dimensions
- Wheelbase: 2,770 mm (109.1 in)
- Length: 4,702 mm (185.1 in)
- Width: 1,932 mm (76.1 in)
- Height: 1,753 mm (69.0 in)

The Brilliance V7 is a mid-size CUV produced by Brilliance Auto under the Zhonghua brand.

== Overview ==
The Brilliance V7 is essentially the 7-seat version of the Brilliance V6 that it was based on. Positioning above the Brilliance V6, the Brilliance V7 was launched during the 2017 Guangzhou Auto Show with prices ranging from 108,700 to 194,700 yuan.

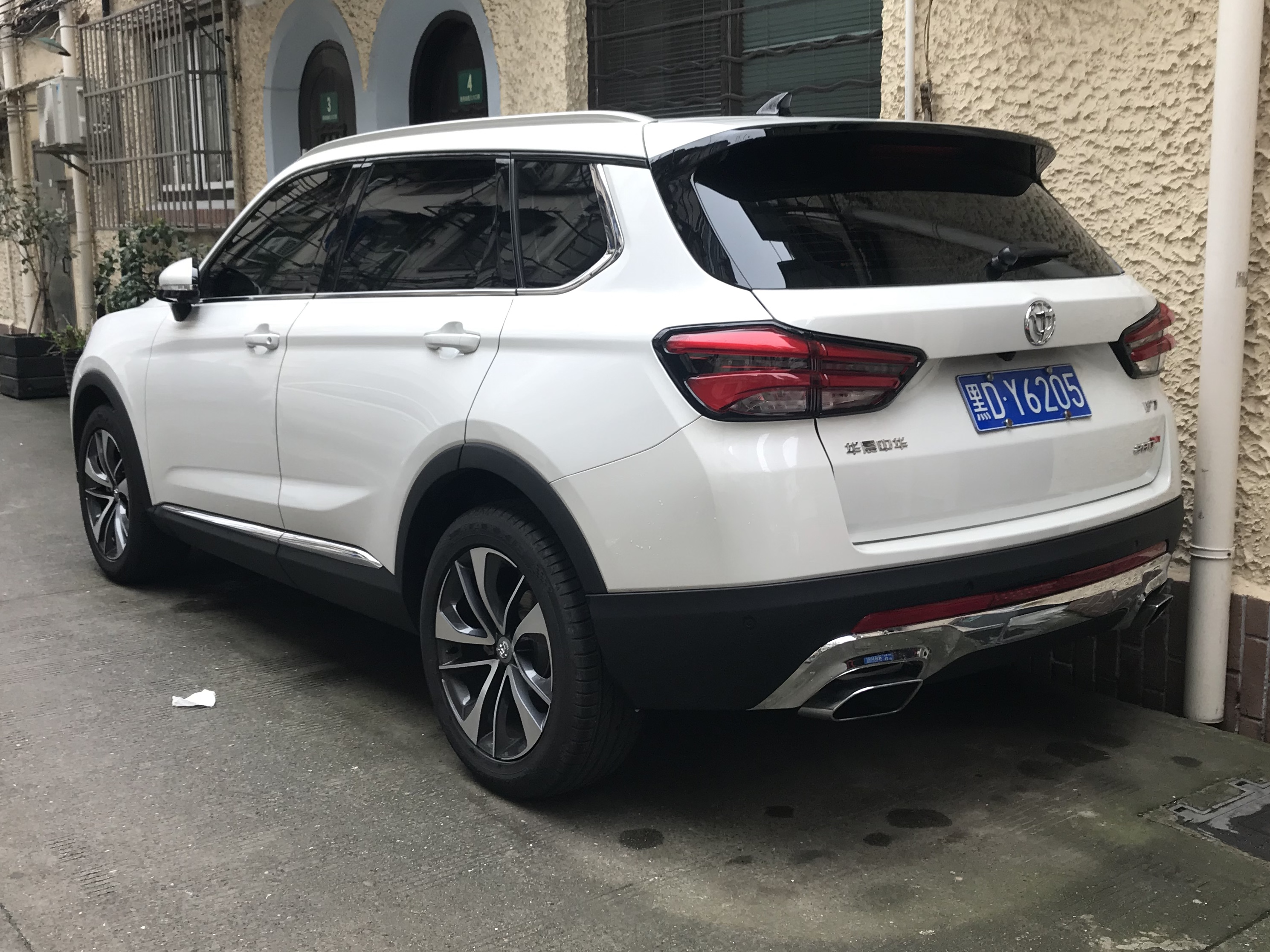
Brilliance V7 rear
