= JAC Shuailing T6 =

Chinese pickup truck

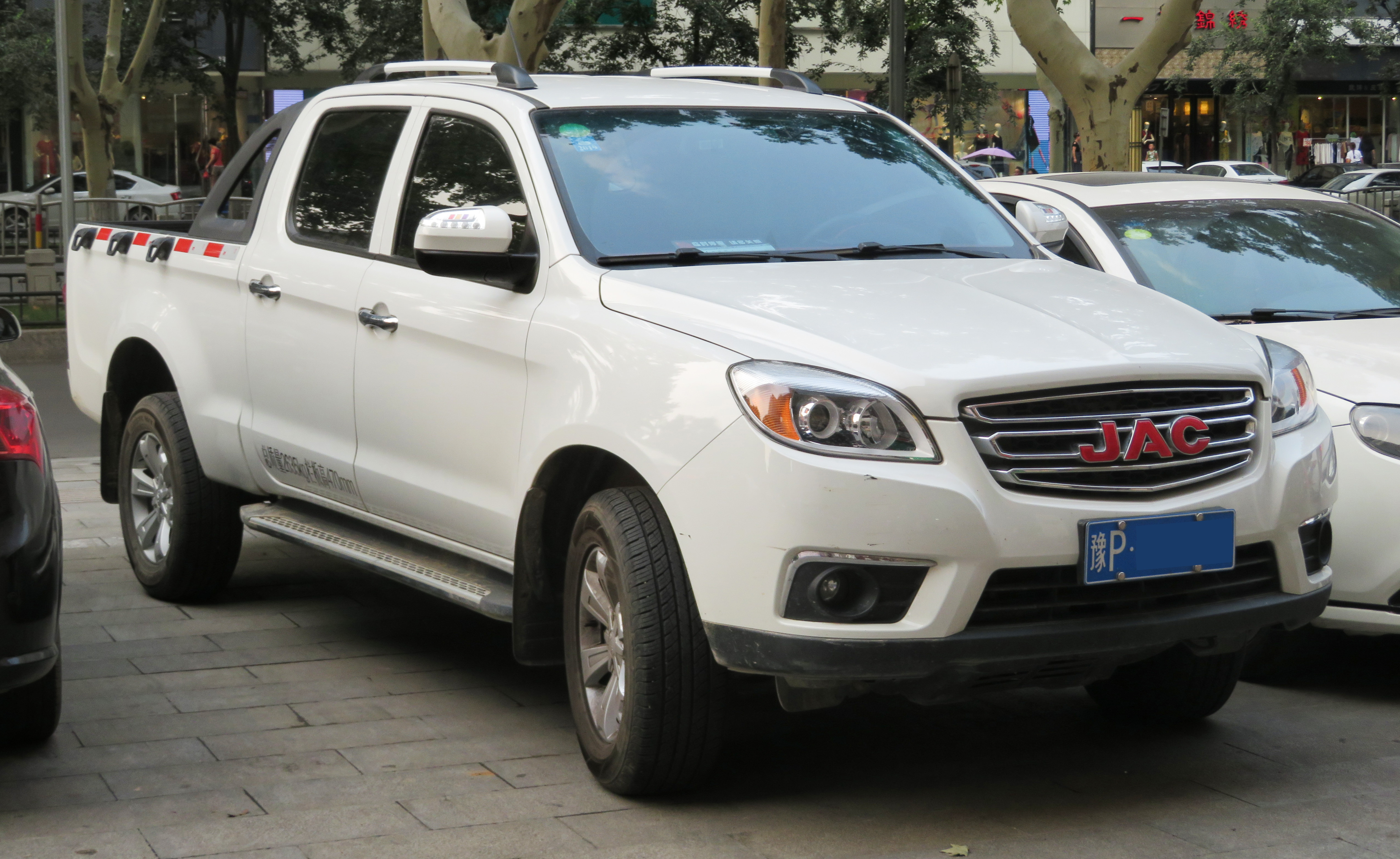

Overview
- Manufacturer: JAC
- Also called: JAC T6; JAC Frison T6 (Mexico); Sollers ST6 (Russia); Higer T6
- Production: 2015–present
- Assembly: Nanchang, Jiangxi, China

Body and chassis
- Class: Mid-size pickup truck
- Body style: 4-door double cab
- Layout: Front-engine, rear-wheel-drive or four-wheel-drive
- Related: JAC Shuailing T8; JAC V7

Powertrain
- Engine: 1.9 L D19TCID7 I4 turbo diesel; 2.0 L 4DB2-1D1 I4 turbo diesel; 2.8 L 4DA1-1 I4 turbo diesel; 2.8 L 4DA1-2C I4 turbo diesel; 2.0 L 4GA3-4D I4 turbo petrol; 2.0 L 4NA3-4E I4 turbo petrol; 2.0 L 4GA3-3D I4 petrol
- Electric motor: 110 kW (150 PS; 150 hp) PMS permanent magnet E-Motor (i3-T330)
- Transmission: 5-speed manual; 6-speed manual
- Battery: 67.2-kWh LiFePO4 (i3-T330)
- Range: 265 km (165 mi)

Dimensions
- Wheelbase: 3,090–3,380 mm (122–133 in)
- Length: 5,315–5,605 mm (209.3–220.7 in)
- Width: 1,830 mm (72 in)
- Height: 1,815 mm (71.5 in)
- Curb weight: 1,835 kg (4,045 lb)

Chronology
- Predecessor: JAC Shuailing

The JAC Shuailing T6 (Chinese: 帅铃T6) is a mid-size pickup truck produced by JAC Motors for the Chinese market.

== Overview ==
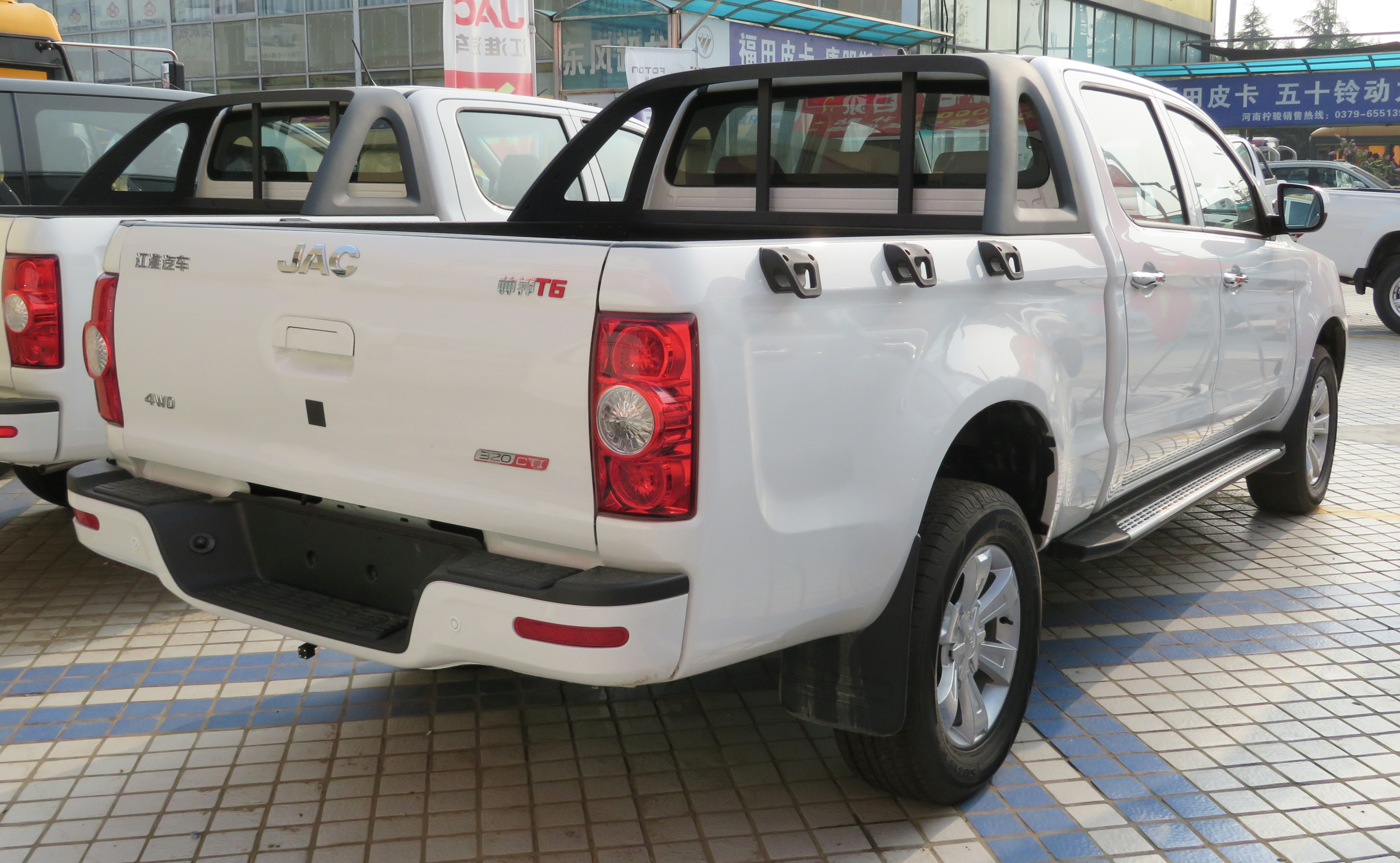
JAC Shuailing T6 (rear)

The JAC Shuailing T6 pickup was launched in the Chinese market in 2015, with prices ranging from 85,800 yuan to 127,800 yuan as of 2019.

The engine options of the Shuailing T6 includes the Yunnei engine and the Navistar engine. For Shuailing T6 with the Yunnei engine produces a maximum power of 70 kW (94 hp) at 3600rpm and a torque of 240 N⋅m (177 lb⋅ft) at 1600-2600rpm. While the Shuailing T6 with the Navistar engine is capable of delivering a maximum power of 88 kW (118 hp) at 3600rpm and a torque of 250 N⋅m (184 lb⋅ft) at 1800-2800rpm.

The Shuailing T6 has a pickup bed with a dimension of 1520×1520×470mm and a LWB version in a size of 1810×1520×470mm offering higher load capacity.

== Electric version ==
There is an all-electric version of the T6, known as the i3-T330, equipped with a 67.2-kWh battery. Another variant of the i3-T330 features the same battery but in the body of the JAC Shuailing T8 (which is also a pick-up truck but with different dimensions and styling).
