= JAC V7 =

Mid-size pickup truck

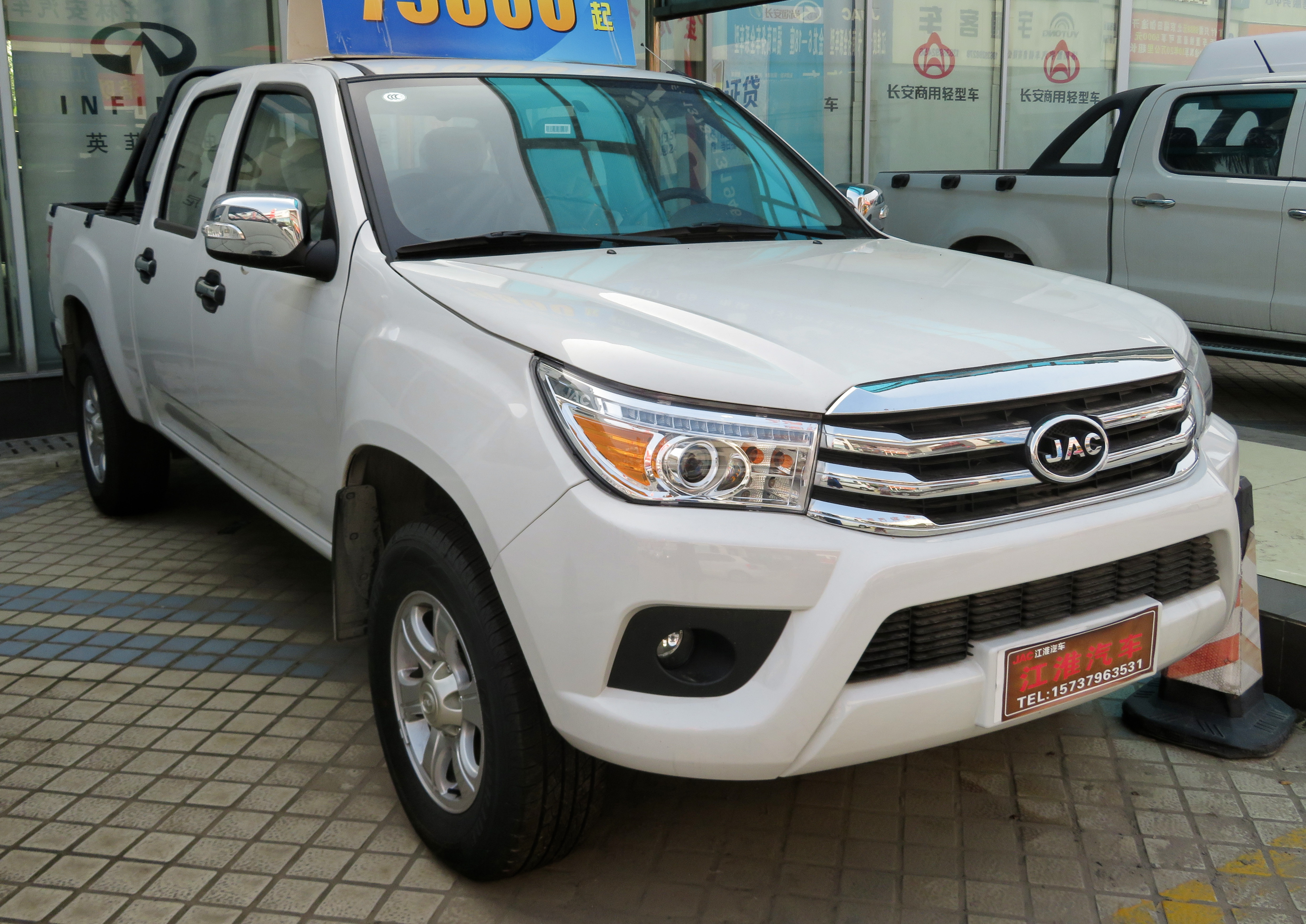

Overview
- Manufacturer: JAC Group
- Production: 2018
- Model years: 2019
- Assembly: China: Nanchang, Jiangxi

Body and chassis
- Class: Mid-size pickup truck
- Body style: 4-door pickup truck
- Layout: Front-engine, rear-wheel-drive
- Related: JAC Shuailing T6; JAC Shuailing T8

Powertrain
- Engine: Petrol: 2.0 L I4; Diesel: 2.0 L turbo I4
- Transmission: 5-speed manual

Dimensions
- Wheelbase: 3,050–3,350 mm (120–132 in)
- Length: 5,305–5,605 mm (208.9–220.7 in)
- Width: 1,825 mm (71.9 in)
- Height: 1,745 mm (68.7 in)

Chronology
- Predecessor: JAC Shuailing

The JAC V7 is a mid-size pickup truck produced by JAC Group for the Chinese market.

== Overview ==
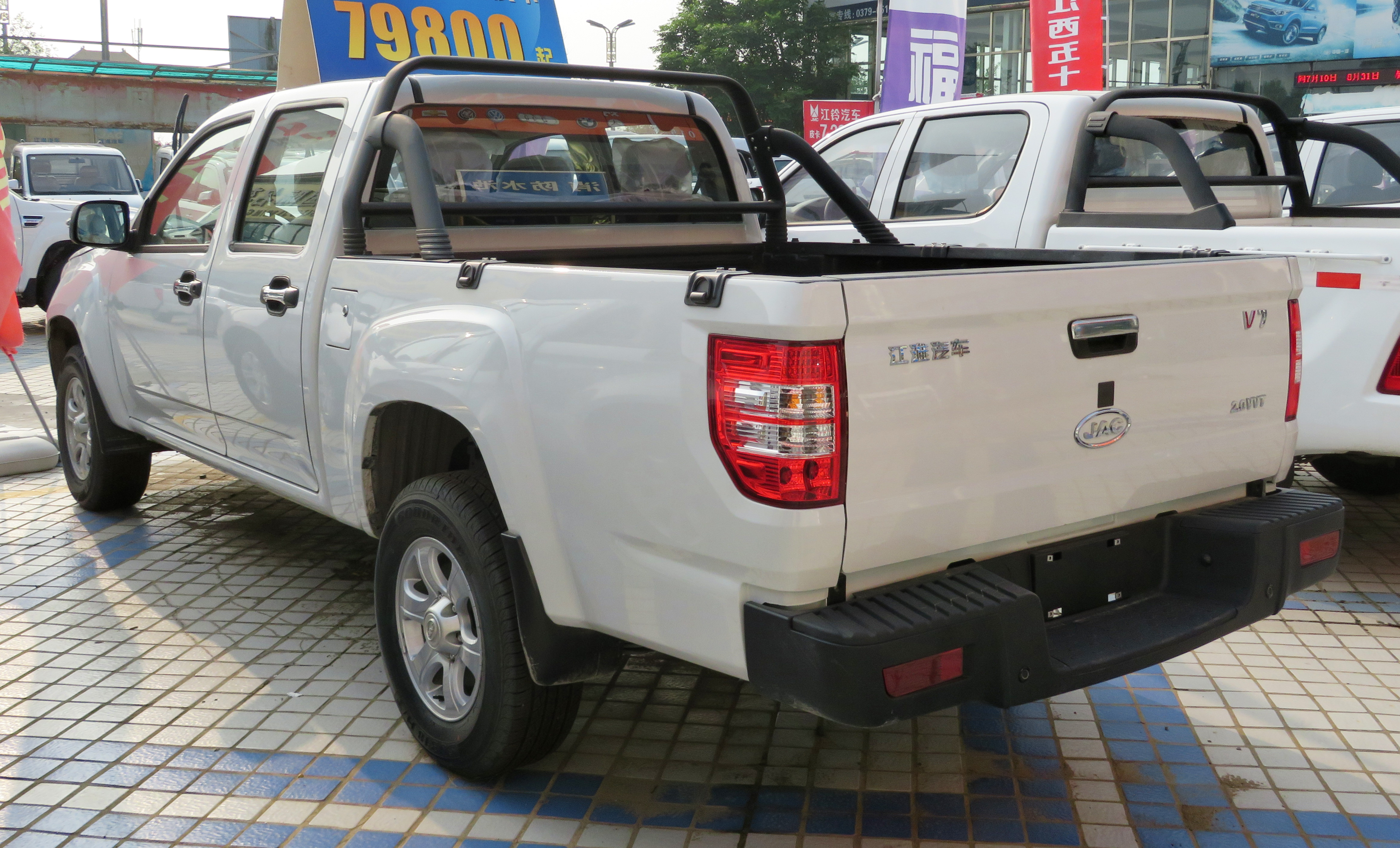
Rear view

The V7 pickup was launched in the Chinese market in 2018.

The engine options of the V7 includes a 2.0 liter gasoline engine and a 2.0 liter diesel engine. The gasoline engine produces a maximum power of 147 hp (108 kW) and a torque of 190 N⋅m (140 lb⋅ft), while the V7 fitted with the diesel engine is capable of delivering a maximum power of 116 hp (85 kW) and a torque of 285 N⋅m (210 lb⋅ft). The styling of the V7 pickup is controversial as the front end design heavily resembles the Toyota Hilux.
