= ATC code V07 =

ATC code V07 All other non-therapeutic products is a therapeutic subgroup of the Anatomical Therapeutic Chemical Classification System, a system of alphanumeric codes developed by the World Health Organization (WHO) for the classification of drugs and other medical products. Subgroup V07 is part of the anatomical group V Various.

Codes for veterinary use (ATCvet codes) can be created by placing the letter Q in front of the human ATC code: for example, QV07. ATCvet codes without corresponding human ATC codes are cited with the leading Q in the following list.
National versions of the ATC classification may include additional codes not present in this list, which follows the WHO version.
