= Haval H6 =

Compact crossover SUV

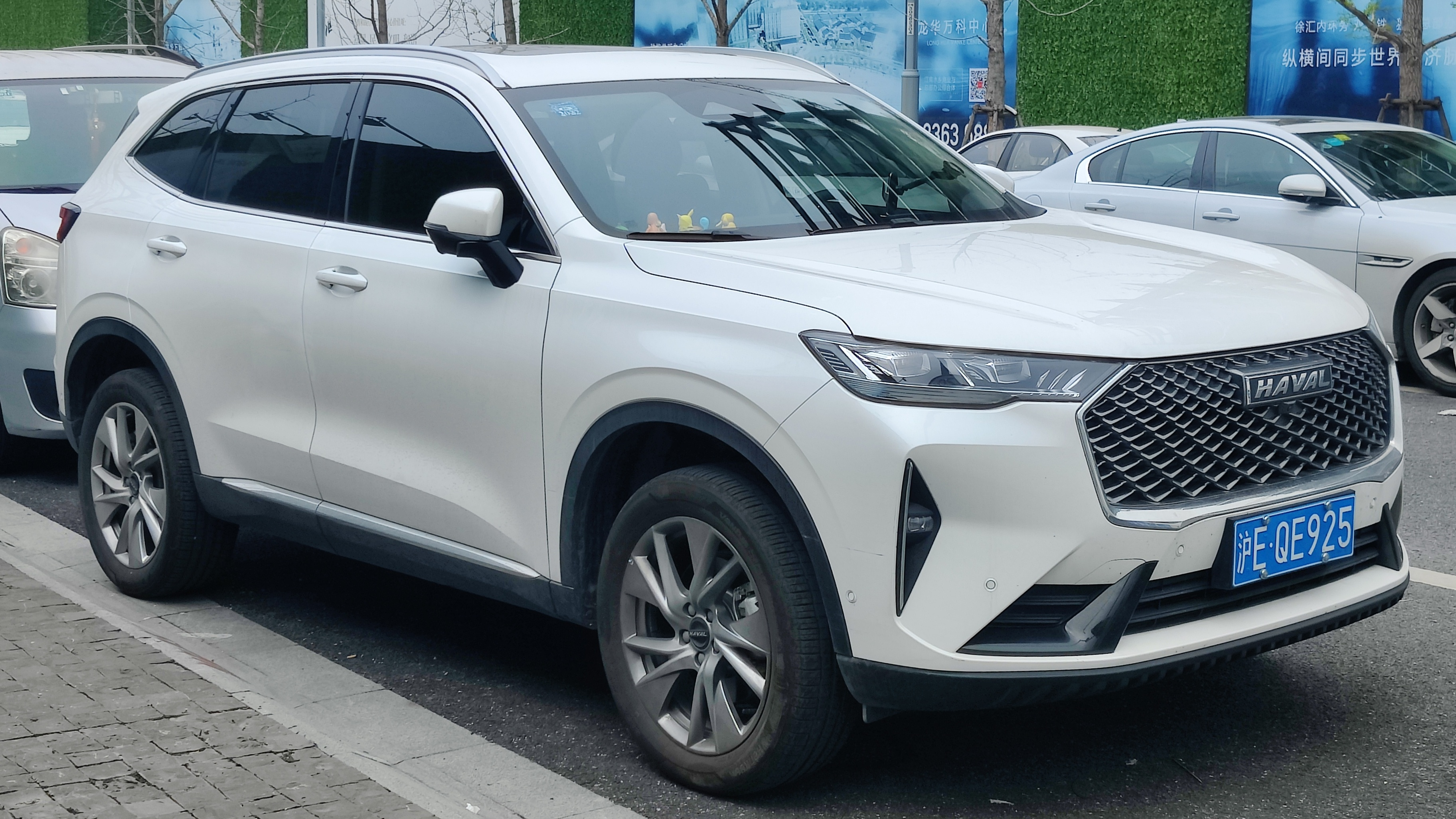
- 2021 Haval H6

Overview
- Manufacturer: Great Wall Motor
- Production: 2011–present

Body and chassis
- Class: Compact crossover SUV (C)
- Body style: 5-door SUV
- Layout: Front-engine, front-wheel-drive or all-wheel-drive

The Haval H6 is a compact crossover SUV produced by the Chinese manufacturer Great Wall Motor under the Haval marque since 2011. It was introduced at the 2011 Shanghai Auto Show. It is produced with both front-wheel-drive and four-wheel-drive drivetrains.

Originally named Great Wall Haval H6, it was later renamed the Haval H6 (and redesigned) for the newly developed Haval brand. It is the successor of the Great Wall Pegasus.

Since its introduction in 2011, the H6 had once led the SUV segment in China for 103 consecutive months, or around 8 years. In December 2016, the H6 set a single-month sales record in the Chinese market with 80,495 units sold, a record that remains unbeaten. As of 2024, GWM has sold more than four million H6 globally, making it the all-time best-selling GWM vehicle.

== First generation (2011) ==
First generation
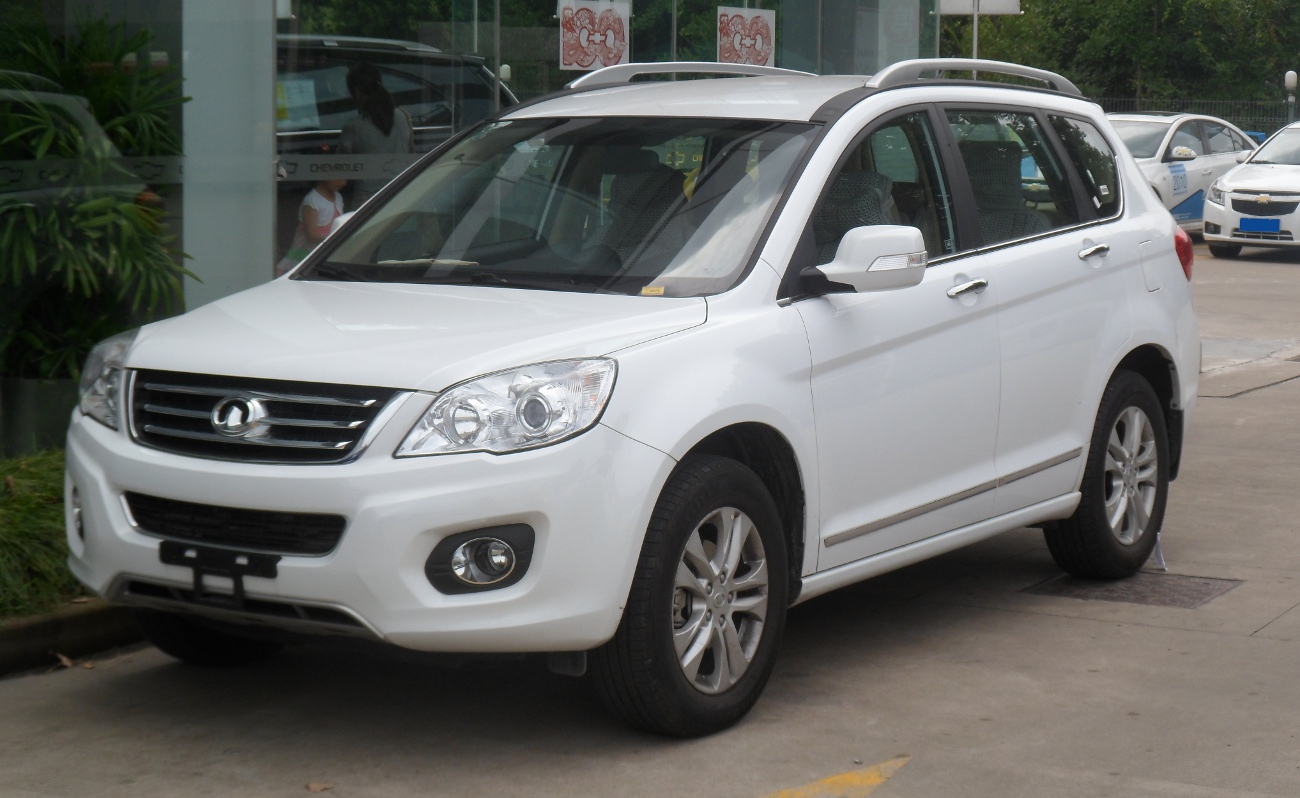

Overview
- Also called: Great Wall Hover H6; Great Wall H6
- Production: 2011–2020
- Assembly: China: Tianjin; Bulgaria: Bahovitsa (Litex Motors); Iran: Golpayegan (Diar)

Body and chassis
- Related: Haval H6 Coupe; Haval M6

Powertrain
- Engine: 1.5 L GW4G15B I4 (turbo petrol); 2.0 L 4G63 I4 (petrol); 2.4 L 4G69 I4 (petrol); 2.0 L GW4D20 I4 (diesel)
- Transmission: 5-speed manual 6-speed manual 4-speed automatic

Dimensions
- Wheelbase: 2,680 mm (105.5 in)
- Length: 4,640 mm (182.7 in)
- Width: 1,825 mm (71.9 in)
- Height: 1,745 mm (68.7 in)
- Curb weight: 1,541–1,725 kg (3,397–3,803 lb)

=== Features ===
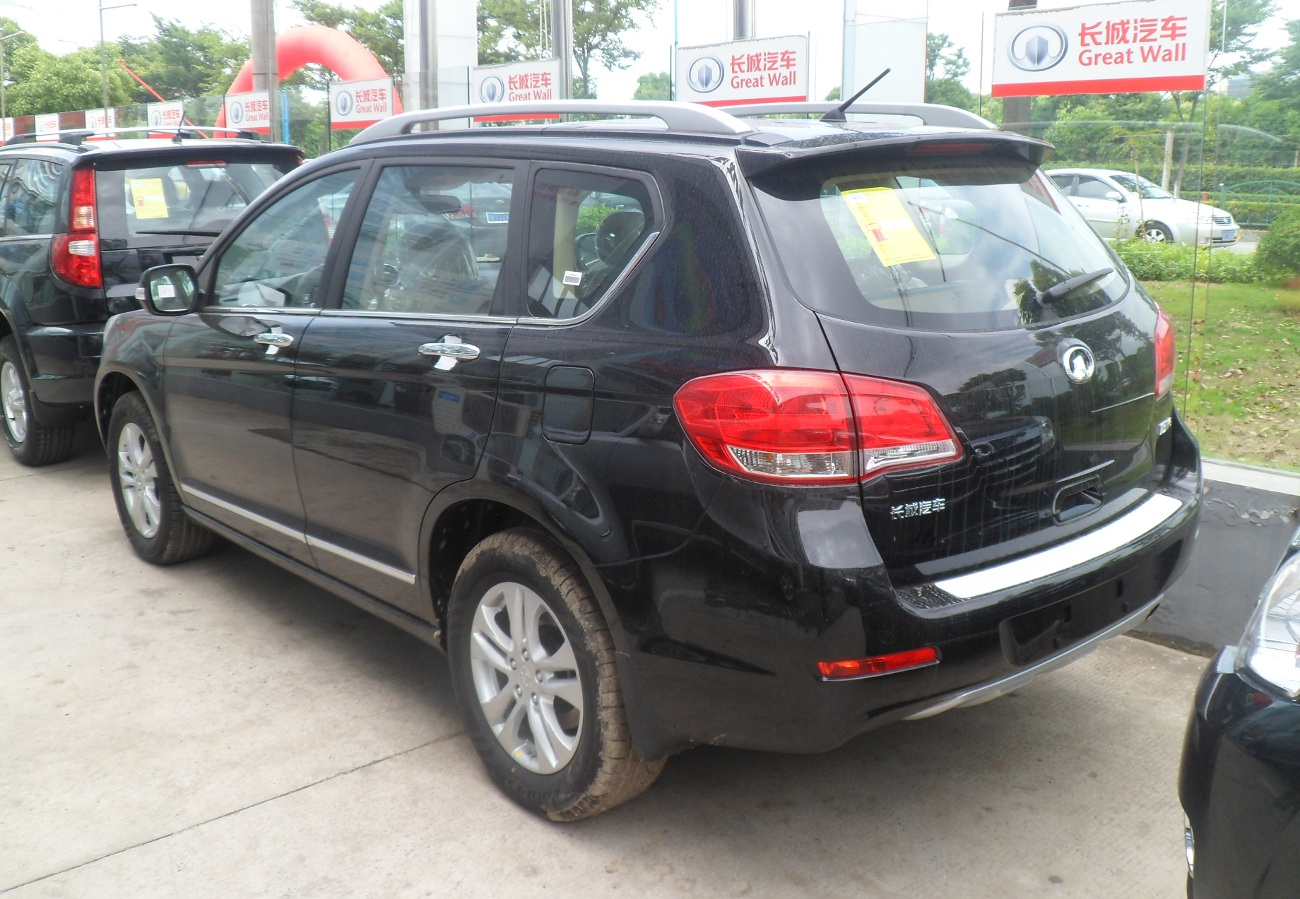
Rear view

The first generation H6 is powered by a 1.5-litre turbo engine producing 150 horsepower (112 kW; 152 PS) or a 1.3-litre turbo engine producing 138 horsepower (103 kW; 140 PS). In the top trim level it can be equipped with high-strength body structure, front, side and curtain airbags, brake assist system, tyre-pressure monitoring system, parking sensors and reversing camera, keyless entry, light and rain sensors, Bluetooth hands free system and a 7-inch touch screen display with DVD multimedia system. It can also be equipped with a 10-way adjustable driver's seat, heated front seats, leather seats, climate control with rear seats air vents, automatic headlights, power sunroof, cruise control and 17-inch aluminum wheels.

It is powered by a range of turbocharged petrol or common rail diesel engines, which are able to meet the Euro V emission standards and can be equipped with Start & Stop system. It has four disk brakes with ABS and EBD, electronic stability control (ESC), MacPherson strut independent front suspension and independent rear suspension with double cross arm and torsion bar springs, and intelligent four-wheel-drive system.

It uses components originating from renowned European and American manufacturers, such as Bosch (traction control), Delphi (diesel electronics), BorgWarner (four-wheel-drive system), and Honeywell (turbocharger).

=== Production ===
The Haval H6 is produced at the new production base of Great Wall Motors, located in Tianjin, China, which inaugurated its mass production in February 2011. It is also assembled (from knock-down kits) at the Litex Motors factory in Bahovitsa, Bulgaria, from where it is exported to other markets in the European Union.

In November 2015, the one millionth Haval H6 rolled off the production lines in the Tianjin plant, approximately four years and three months after its launch.

=== Safety ===
In April 2012, China-NCAP awarded the Haval H6 with five stars out of five, in a crash test consisting of three types of collision: a full-wrap frontal collision against a rigid barrier at 50 km/h (31 mph), a frontal collision at 40% offset against a deformable barrier at 56 km/h (35 mph) and a side impact test at 50 km/h (31 mph).

=== Reception ===
In a review made by the Italian magazine Al Volante, the Haval H6 was appreciated for the comfortable and spacious interior, the rich endowment with features and its low price against the European, Korean and Japanese rivals. It was criticized for its relatively sluggish gearbox, the lack of power from the diesel engine at low revs, the rear window visibility and the rigid plastic used in the dashboard.

It also received praise for its luggage compartment capacity, which ranges from 808 litres (28.5 cu ft) to 2,010 litres (71 cu ft), with the rear seats folded, and is the largest in its size class.

=== Gallery ===
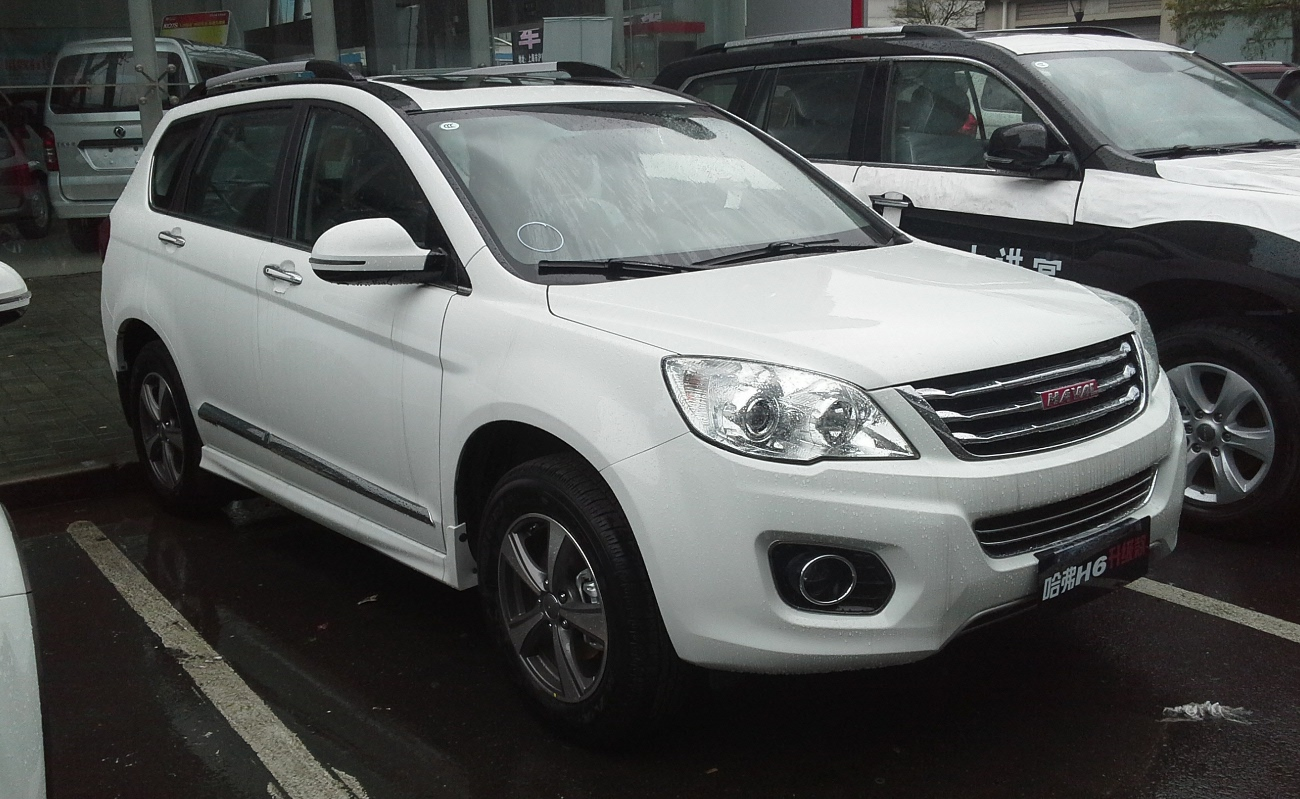
2015 Haval H6 Red Label

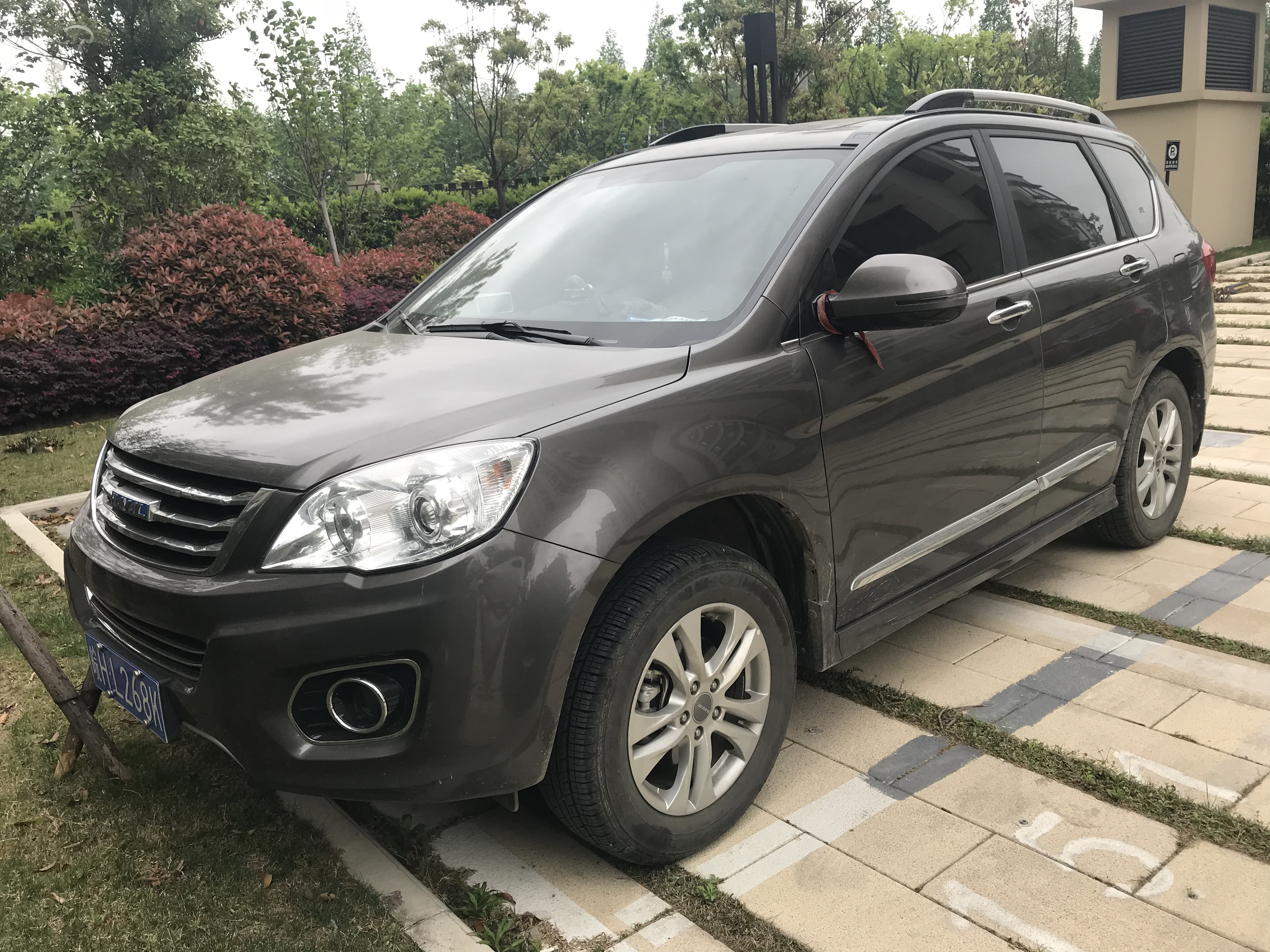
Haval H6 Blue Label (front)

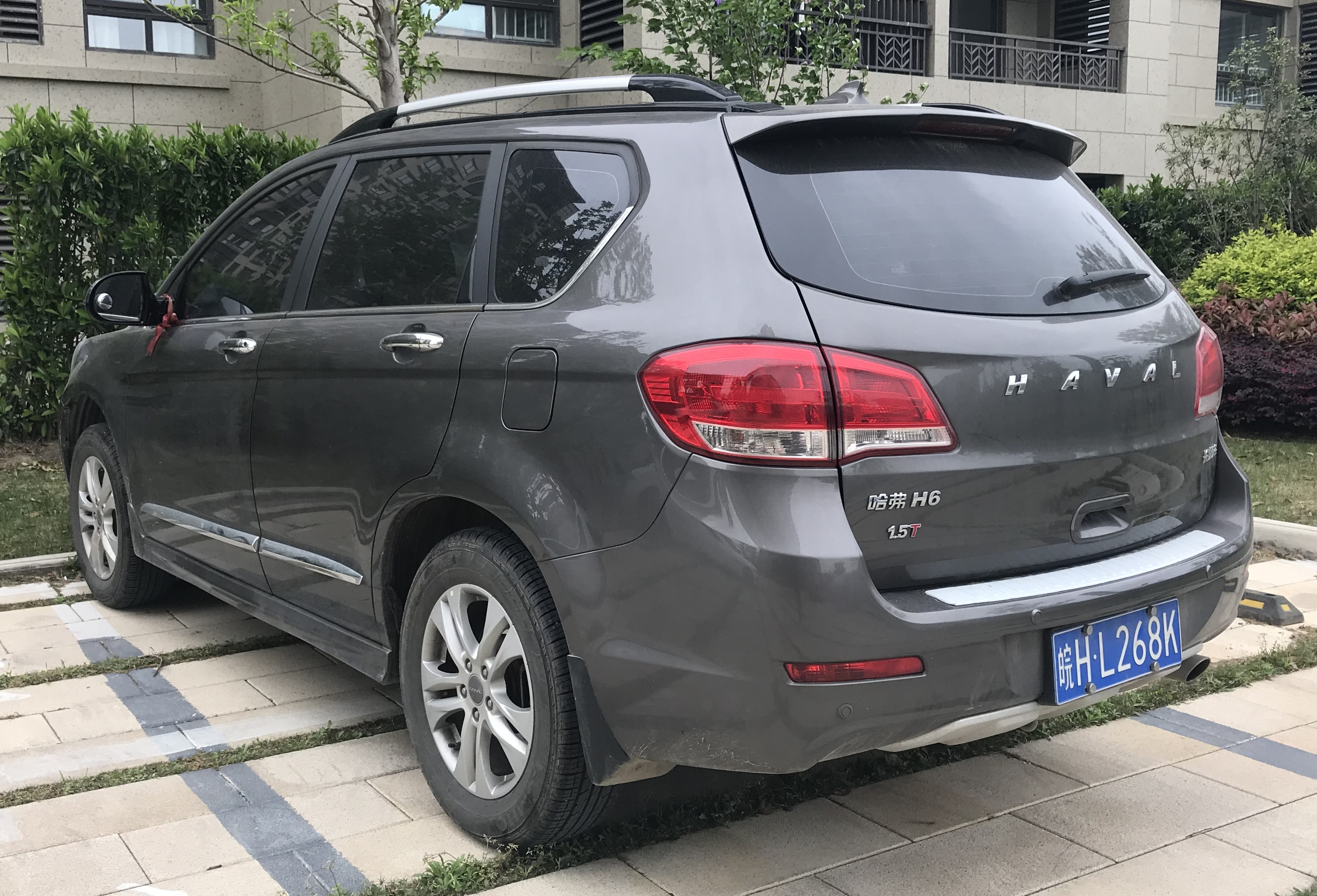
Haval H6 Blue Label (back)

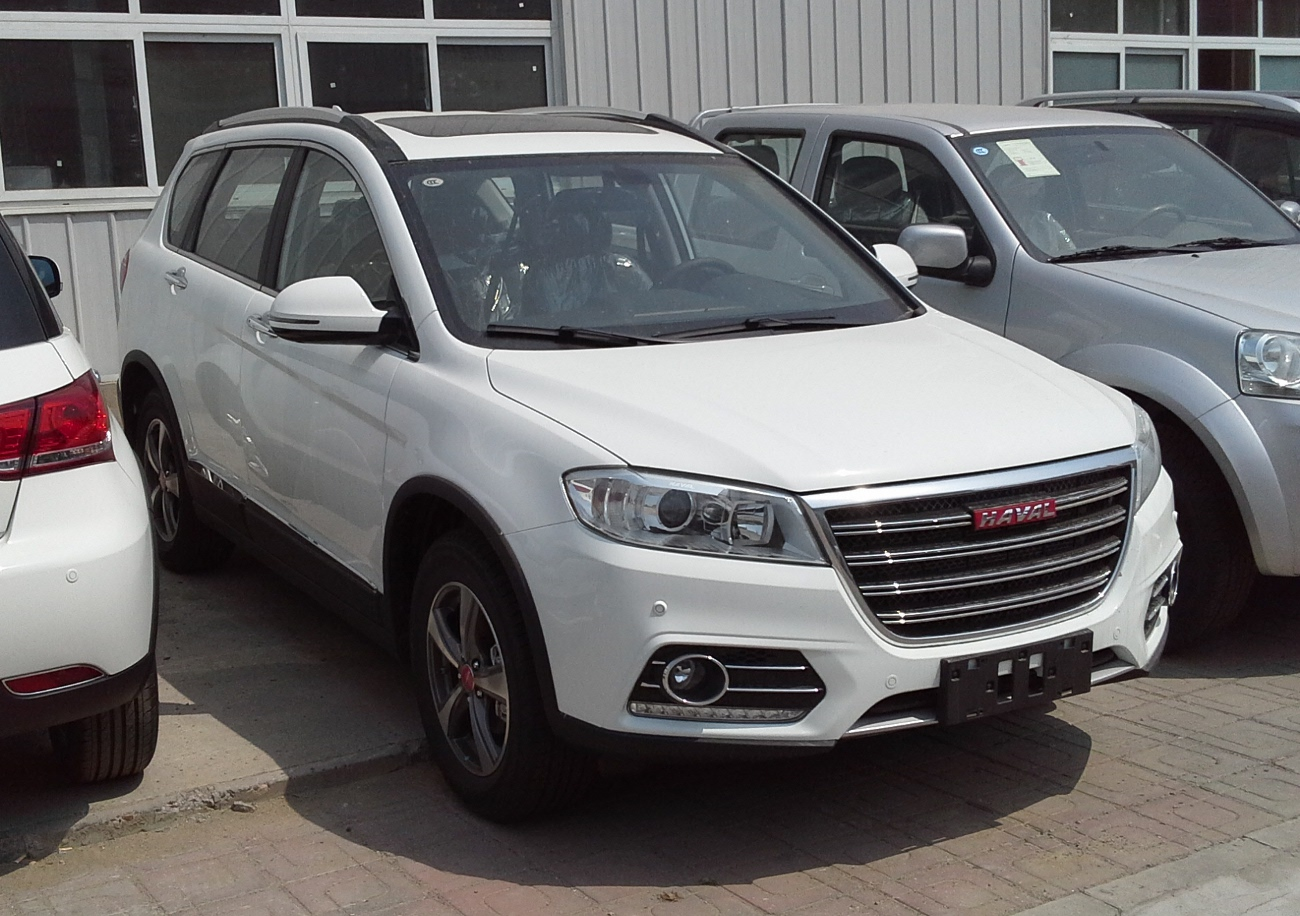
2015 Haval H6 Sport Red Label (front)

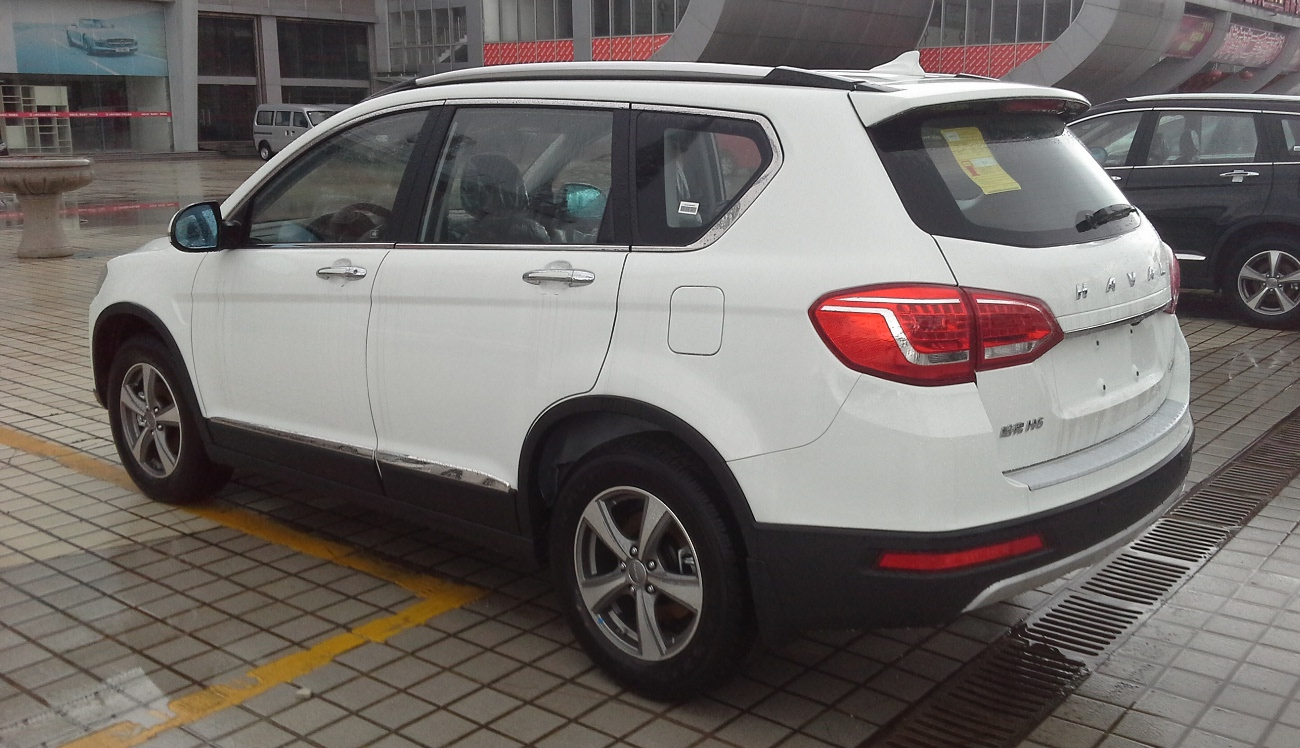
2015 Haval H6 Sport Red Label (back)

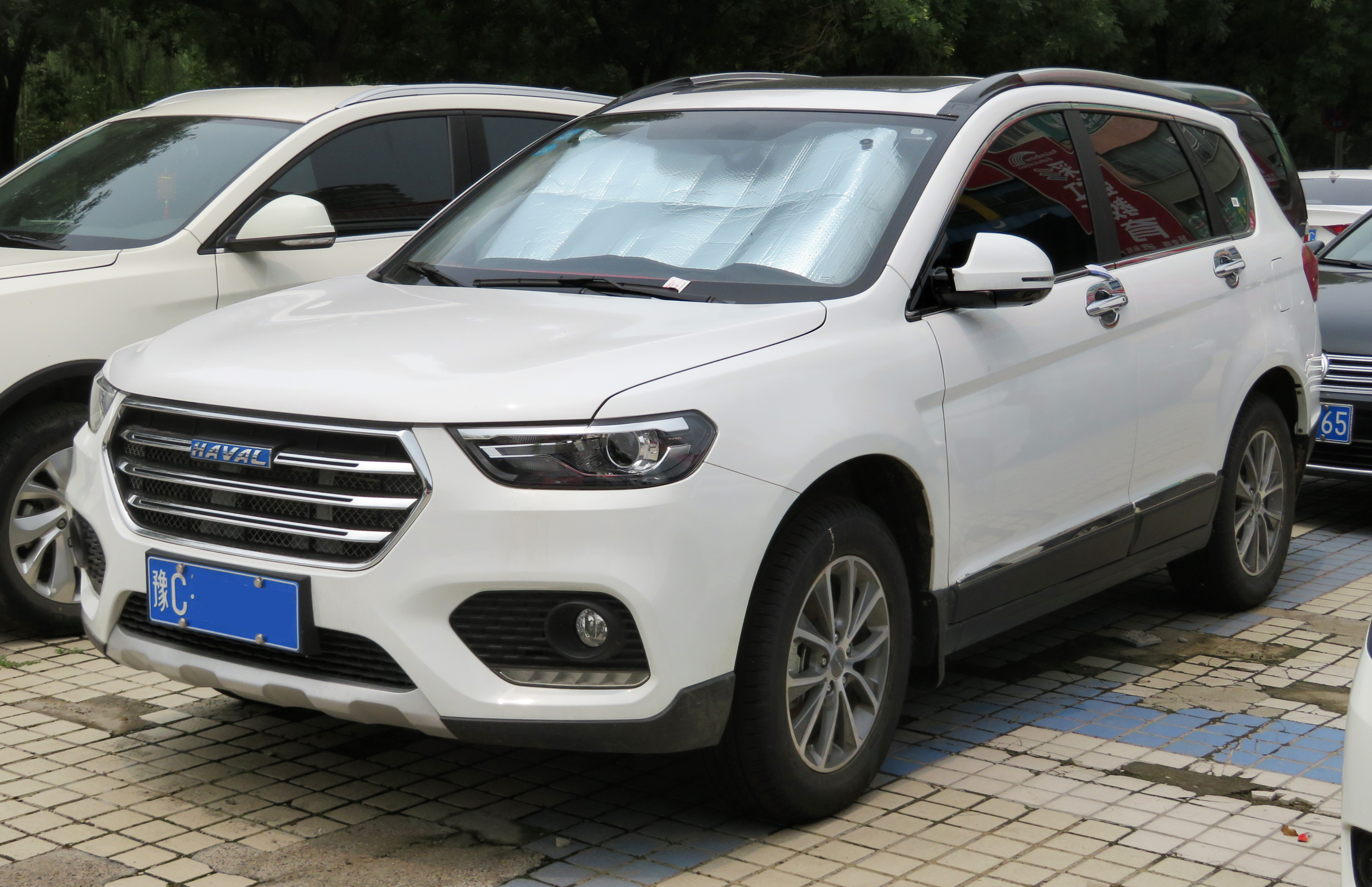
2018 Haval H6 Sport Blue Label (front)

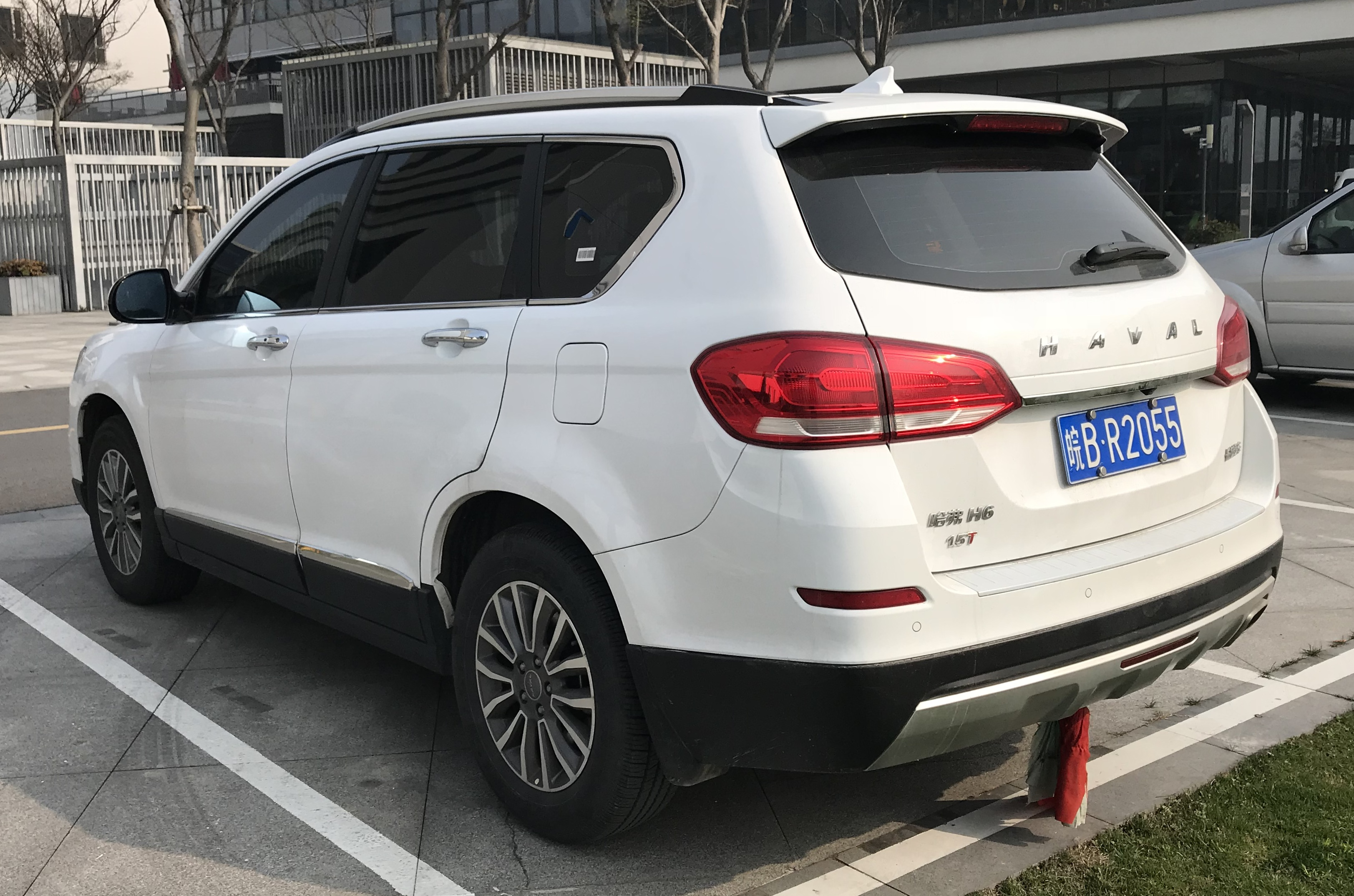
2018 Haval H6 Sport Blue Label (back)

=== Haval H6 Coupe (Blue Label, first generation) ===
Unveiled at the 2015 Shanghai Auto Show, the Haval H6 coupe is the production version of the previously launched Haval Coupe C concept which debuted at the 2014 Beijing Auto Show. Despite the slightly smaller dimensions compared to the regular Haval H6, it was positioned slightly higher in the market.

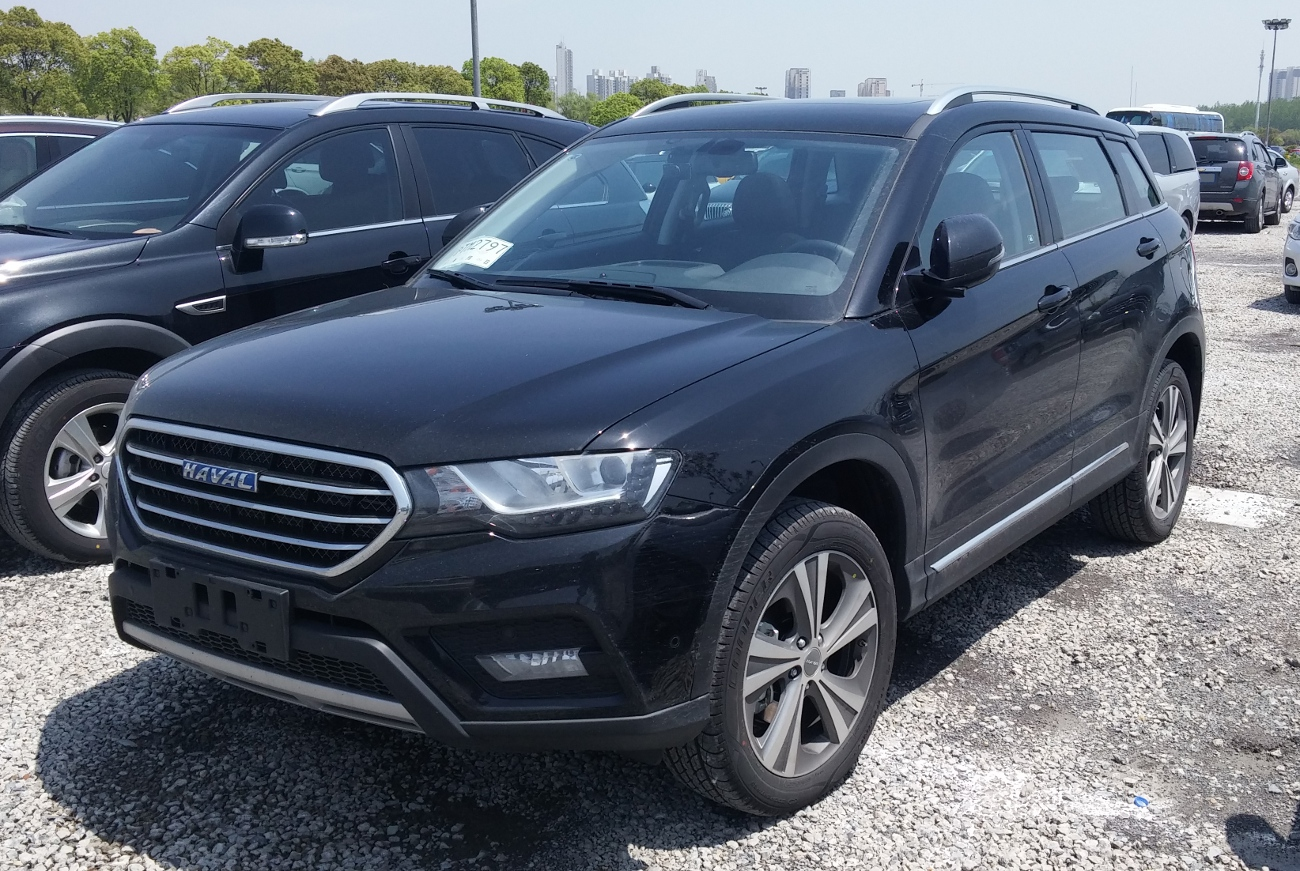

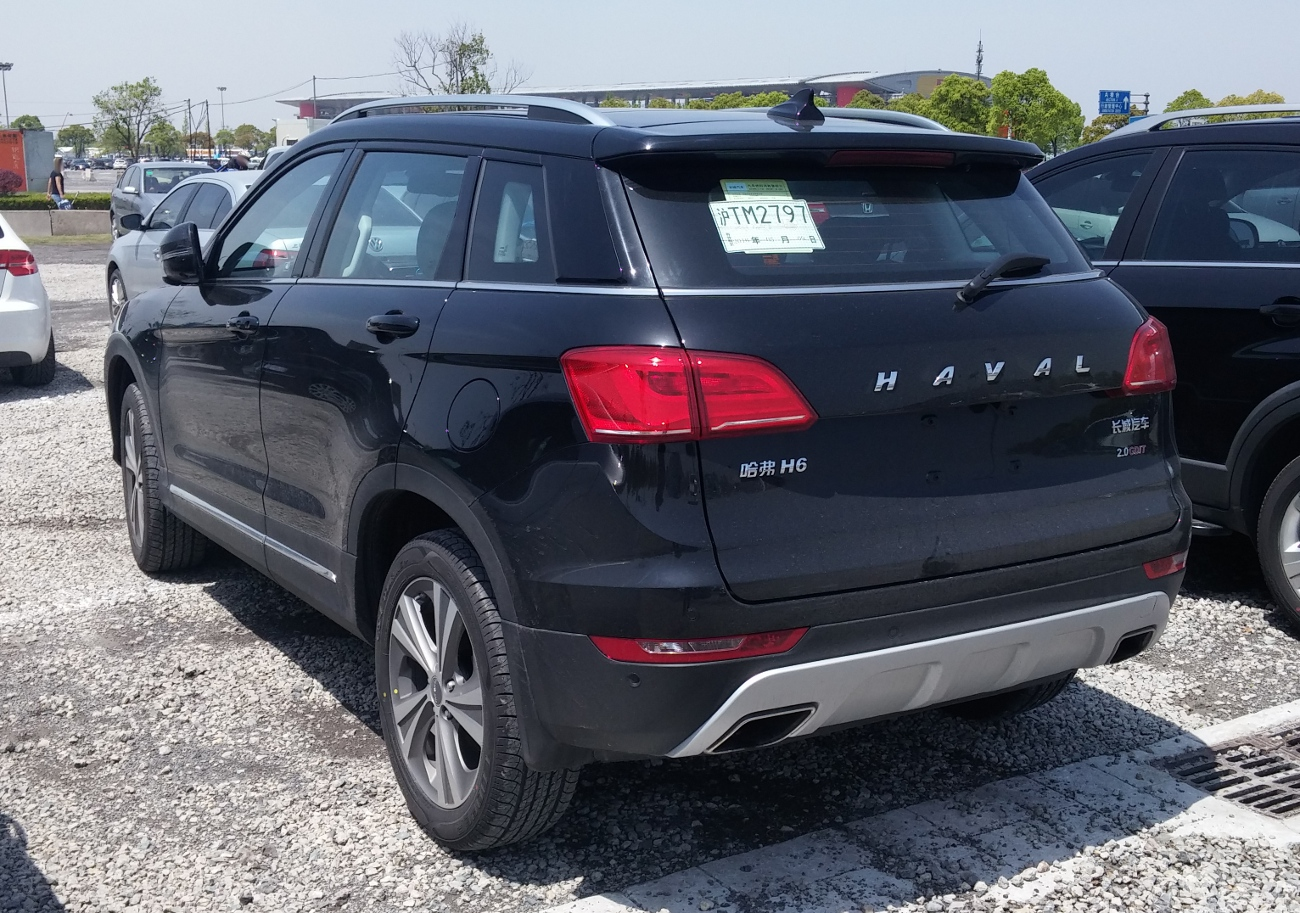

== Second generation (2017) ==
Second generation
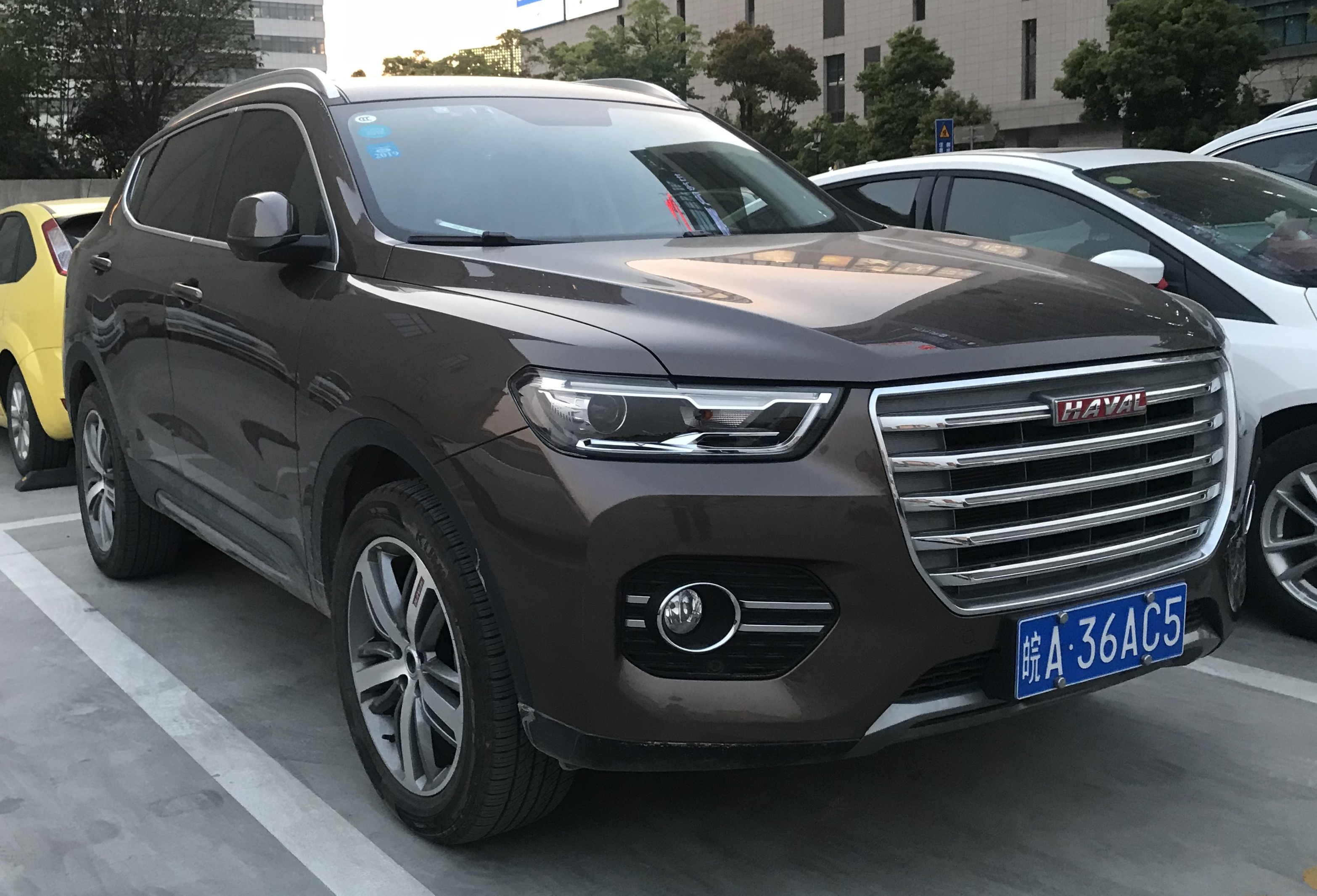

Overview
- Production: 2017–present
- Assembly: China: Tianjin

Body and chassis
- Related: WEY VV5; Haval F5

Powertrain
- Engine: 1.3 L GW4B13 I4 (turbo petrol); 1.5 L GW4B15 I4 (turbo petrol); 1.5 L GW4G15B I4 (petrol); 2.0 L GW4C20 I4 (petrol); 2.0 L GW4D20 I4 (diesel)
- Transmission: 6 speed manual 6 speed automatic 7-speed DCT

Dimensions
- Length: 4,610 mm (181.5 in) (Blue Label); 4,600 mm (181.1 in) (Red Label)
- Width: 1,860 mm (73.2 in)
- Height: 1,720 mm (67.7 in)

The second generation Haval H6 was based on the same platform as its predecessor, the first generation Haval H6. However, the first generation Haval H6 low-end versions will continue as a budget model positioned below the second generation. The second generation Haval H6 also shares the same underpinnings of the WEY VV5.

=== Variants ===
The second generation Haval H6 was available as two variants at launch with different designs for different target market groups, distinguished by the colour of the Haval badge. The Haval H6 Blue Label model features a blue Haval badge while the Red Label model has a red Haval badge. The H6 Red Label and Blue Label differ mostly at the front and rear. The front ends are fitted with different grilles, bumpers, and lights. The rear features different tailgate design, bumper design with different mud guards and different pipes. The duo-label strategy was dropped later in 2020 with the logo replaced with a Black label while styling-wise the variant that continued to be available was the previous Red Label model.

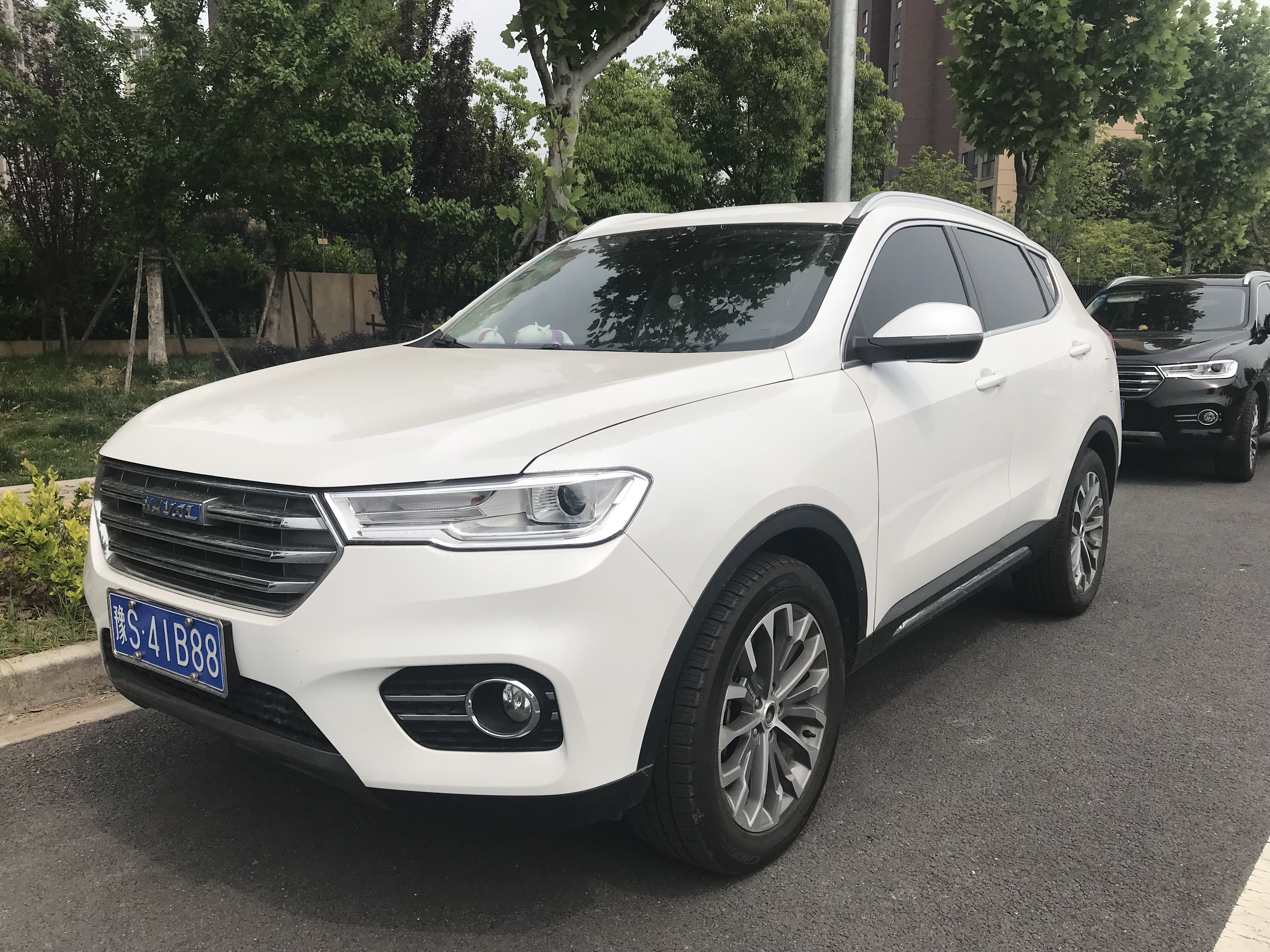
Haval H6 II Blue Label front

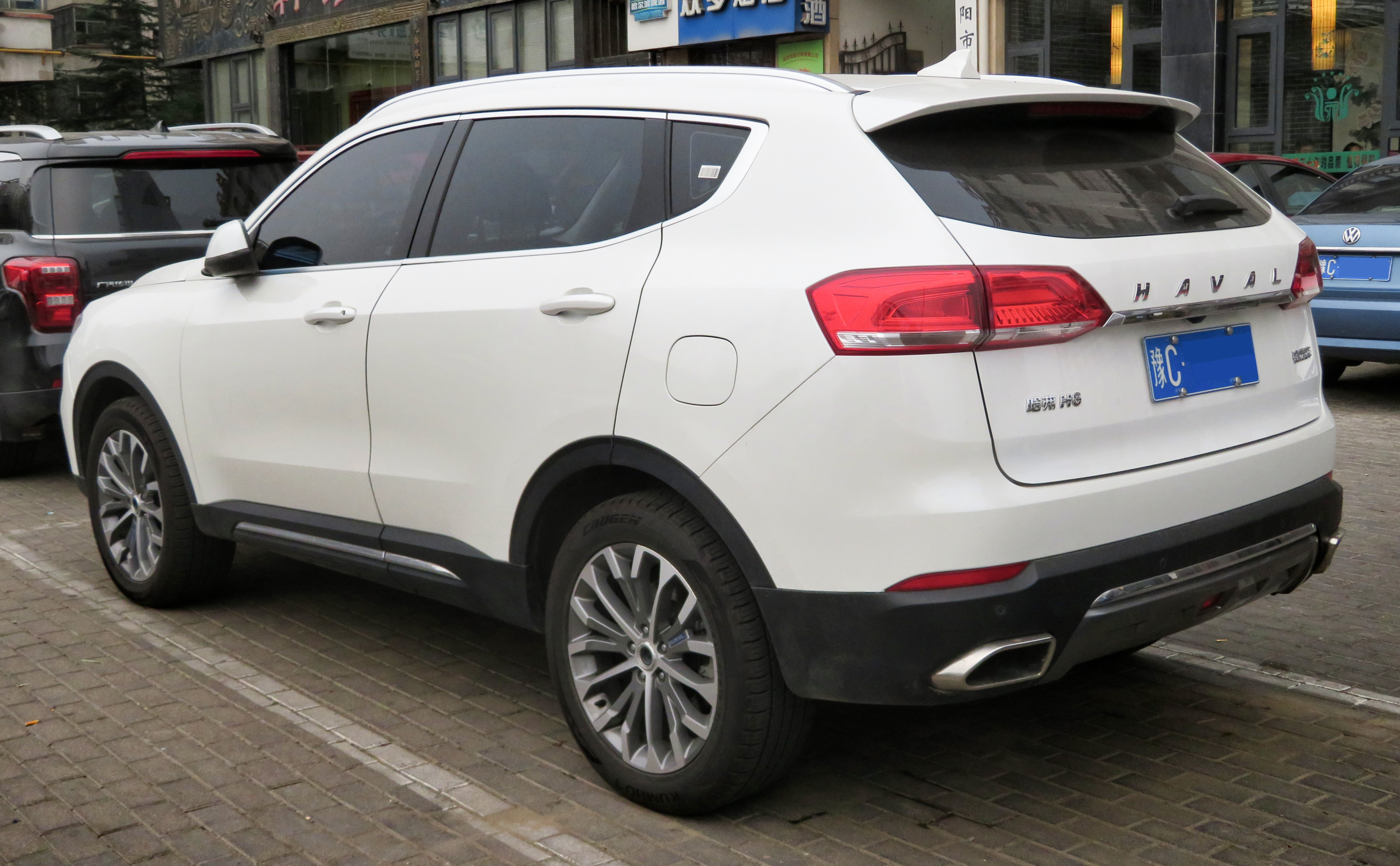
Haval H6 II Blue Label rear

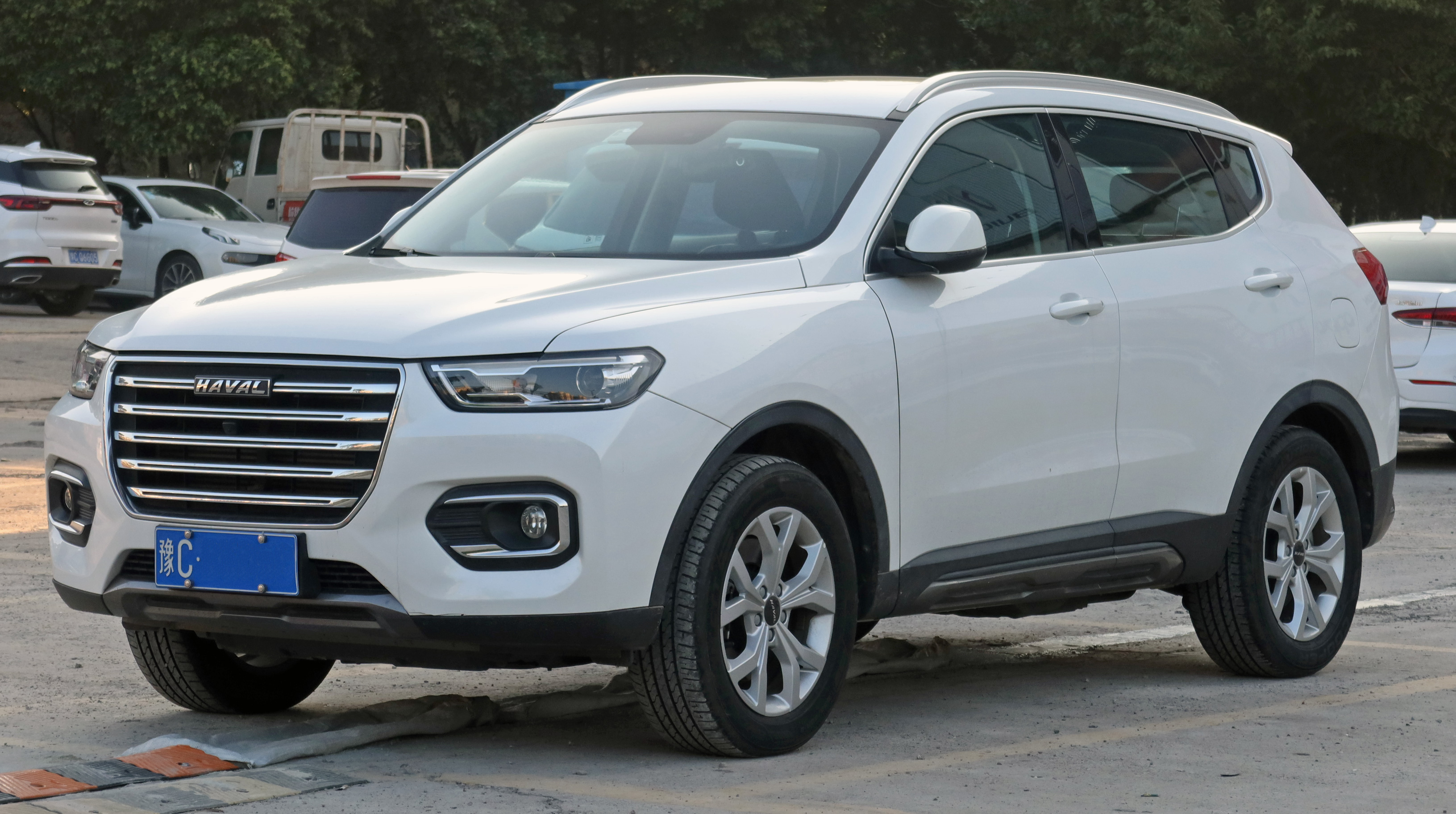
Haval H6 II Red Label front

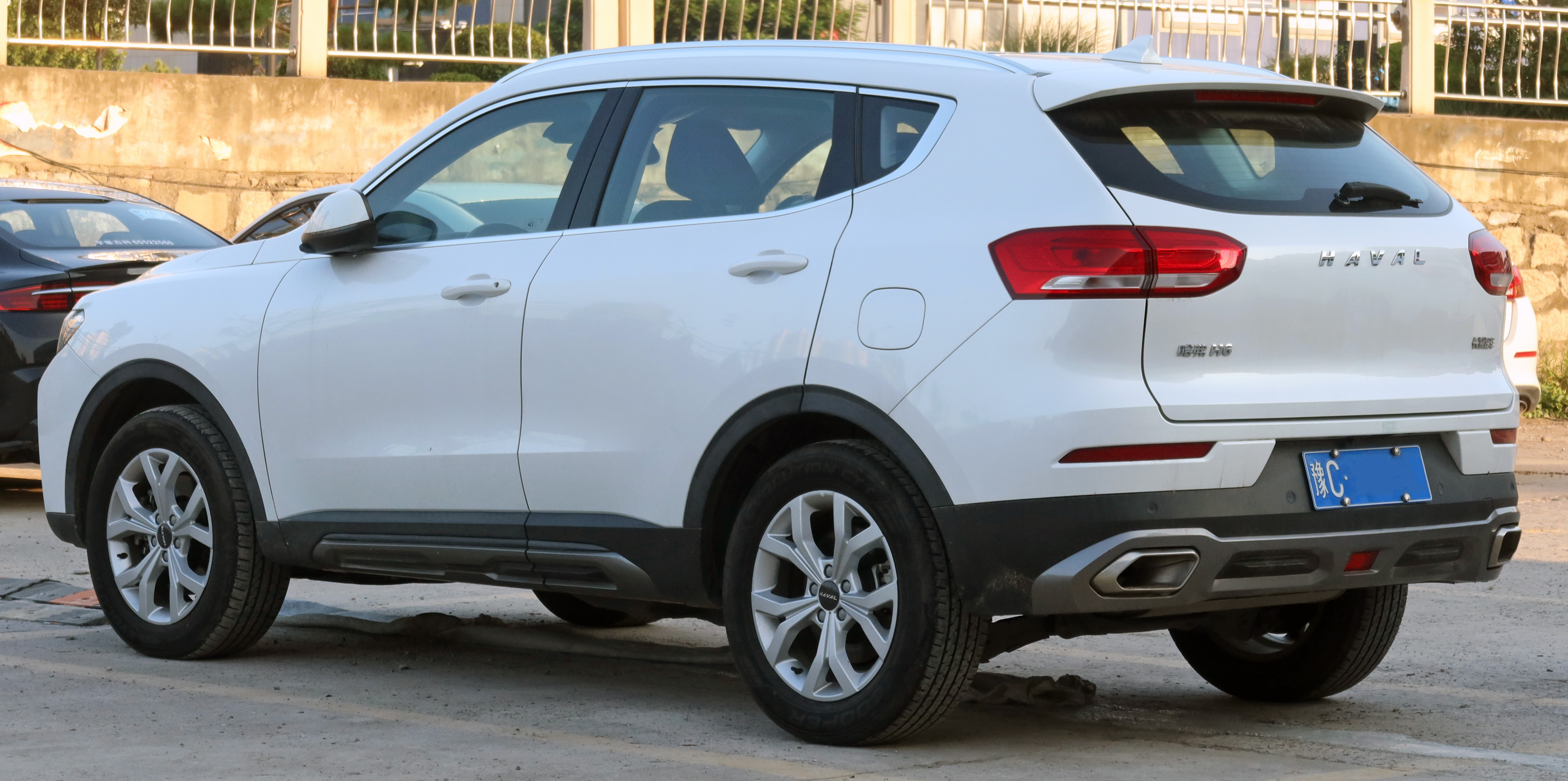
Haval H6 II Red Label rear

=== Powertrain ===
The engine in the second generation Haval H6 is the same engine as the one powering the WEY 02, which is a 2.0-litre turbo engine producing 197 horsepower (147 kW; 200 PS).

=== Haval H6 China-Chic Edition ===
In March 2021, a special edition of the Haval H6 was launched called the China-Chic Edition (国潮版). The China-Chic Edition Haval H6 is based on the second generation Haval H6 while featuring a redesigned front fascia, rear end and window graphics. Acceleration from 0 to 100 km/h (62 mph) for the China-Chic edition is 7.6 seconds.

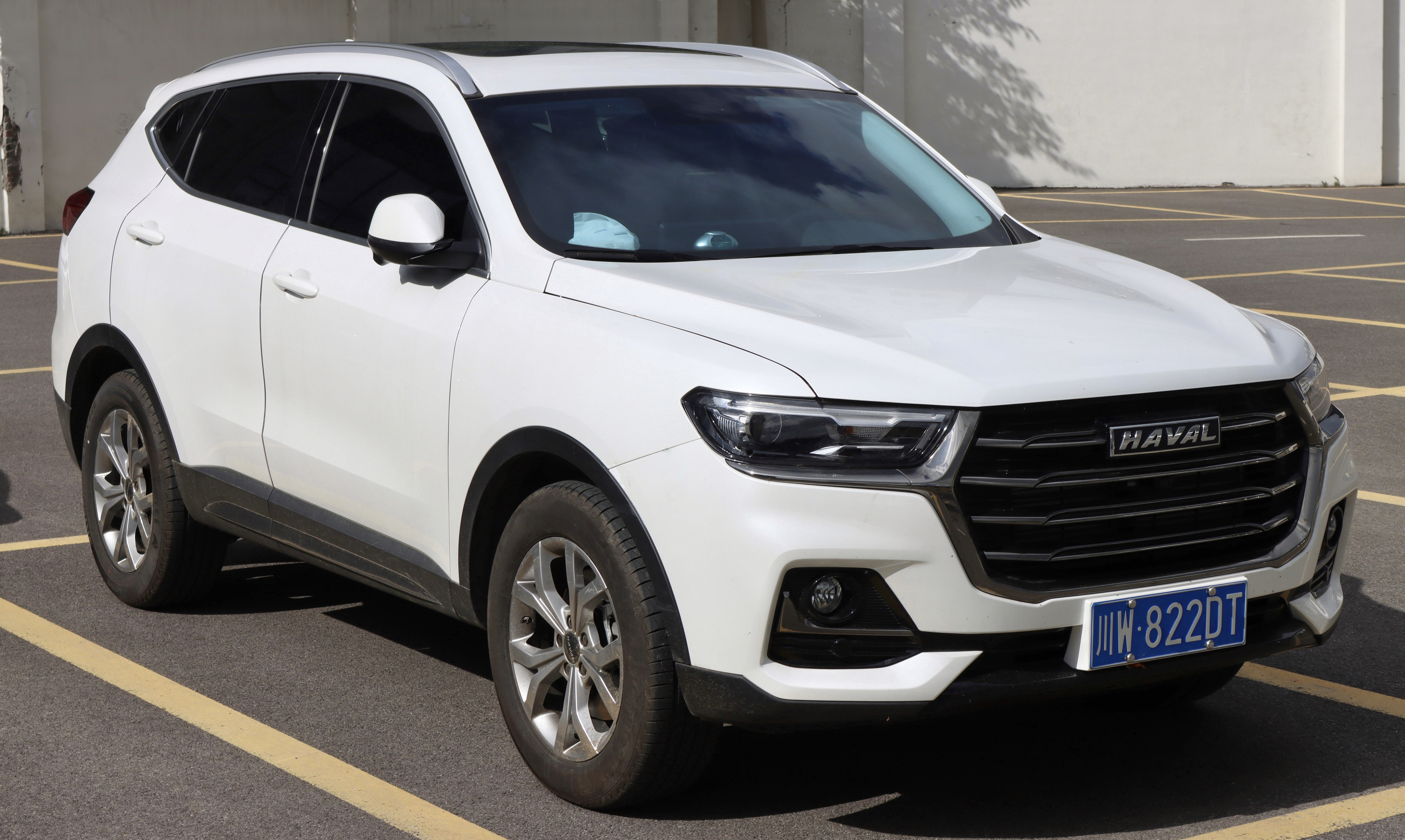
Haval H6 China-Chic Edition

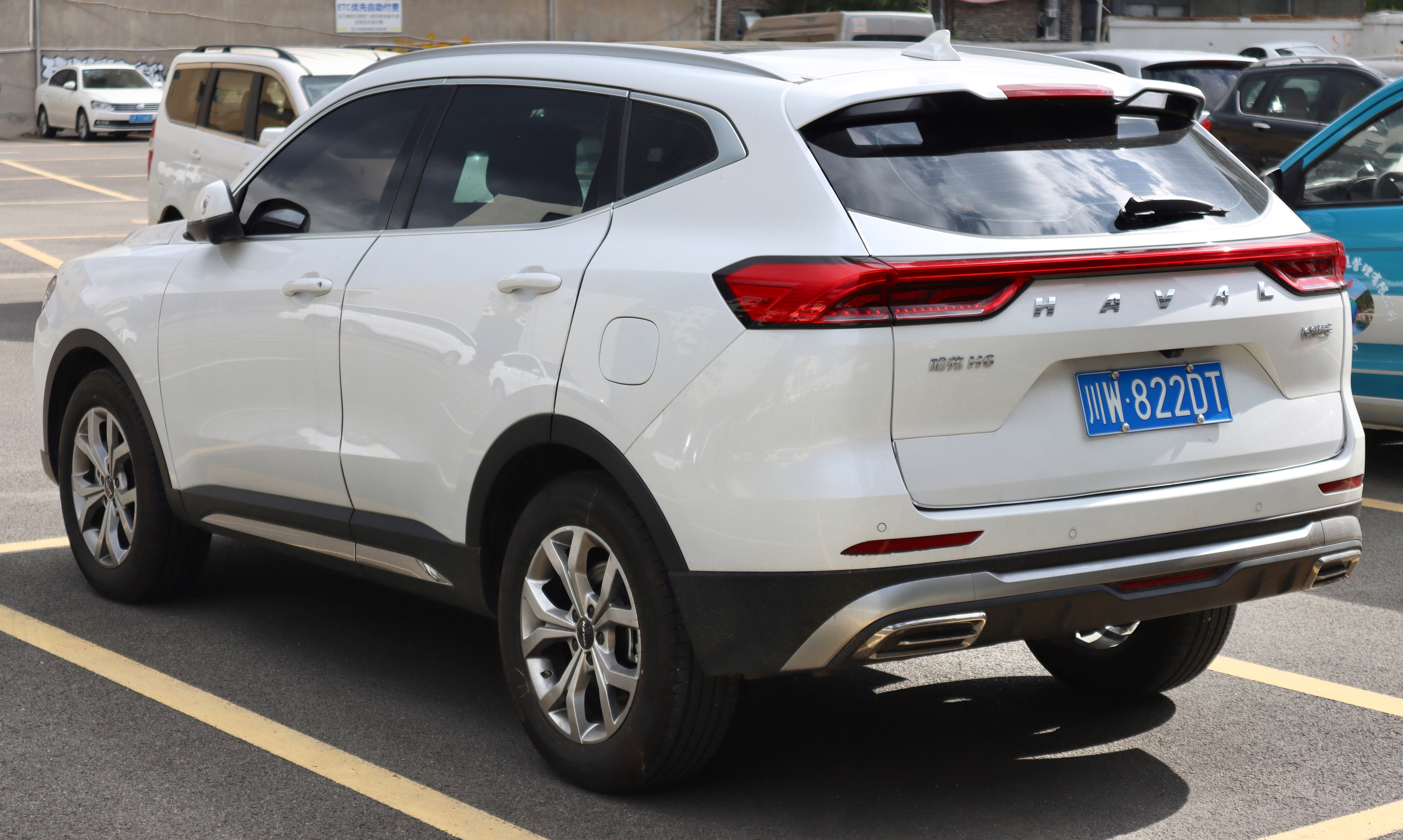
Rear view

=== Haval H6 Coupe (Red Label, second generation) ===
A completely restyled Red Label version of the Haval H6 Coupe was introduced in 2018 with the whole vehicle redesigned, while selling alongside the original Haval H6 Coupe and making the original Haval H6 Coupe a Blue Label model.

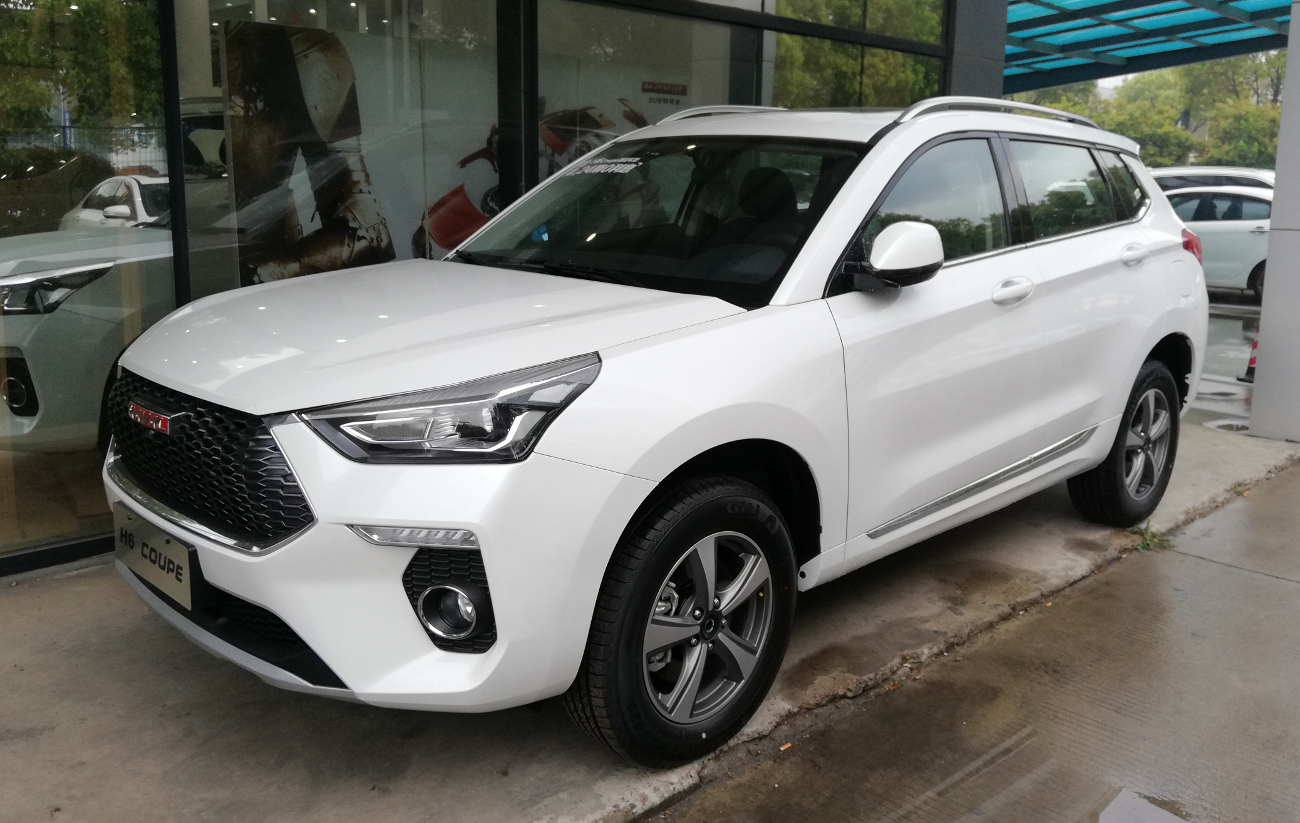

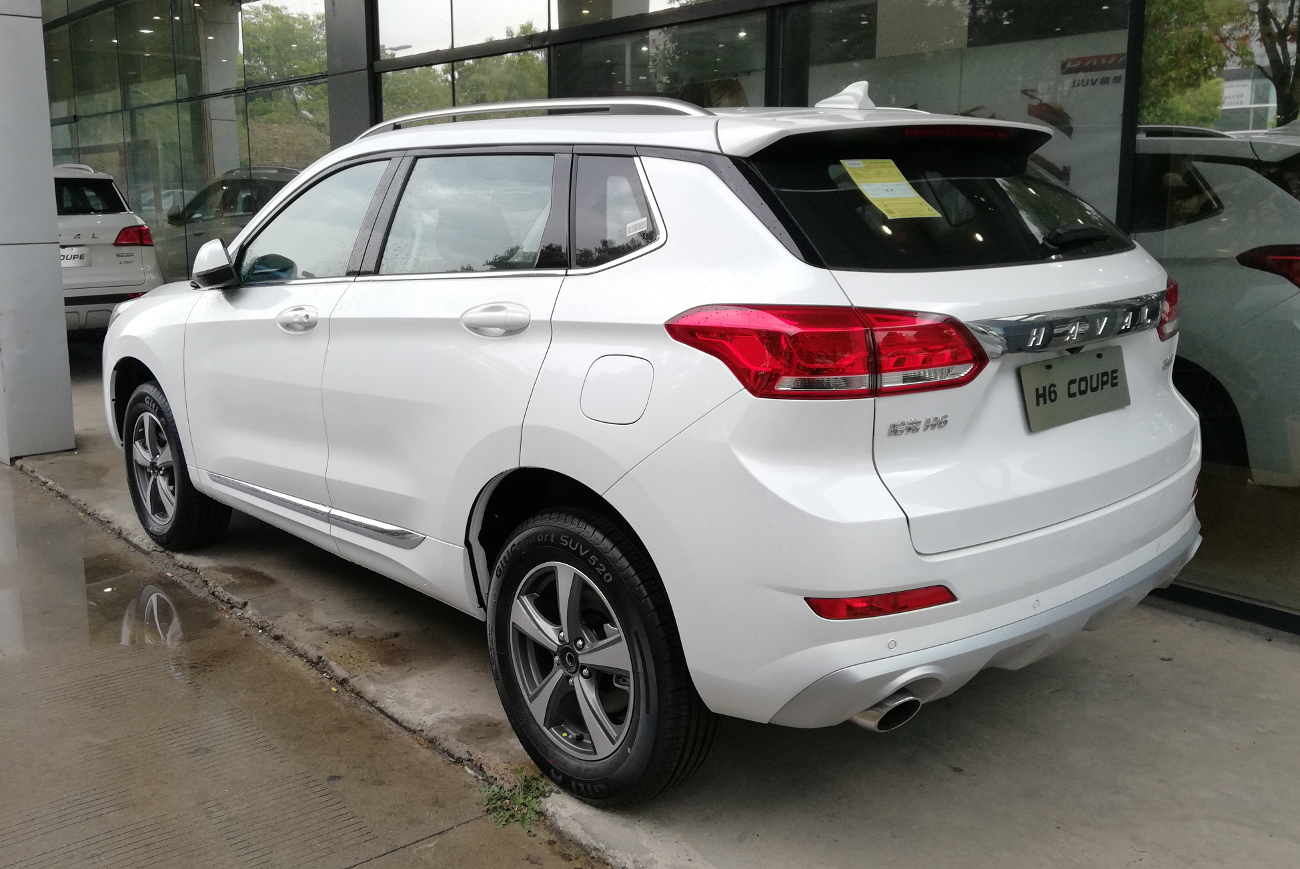

== Third generation (2020) ==
Third generation
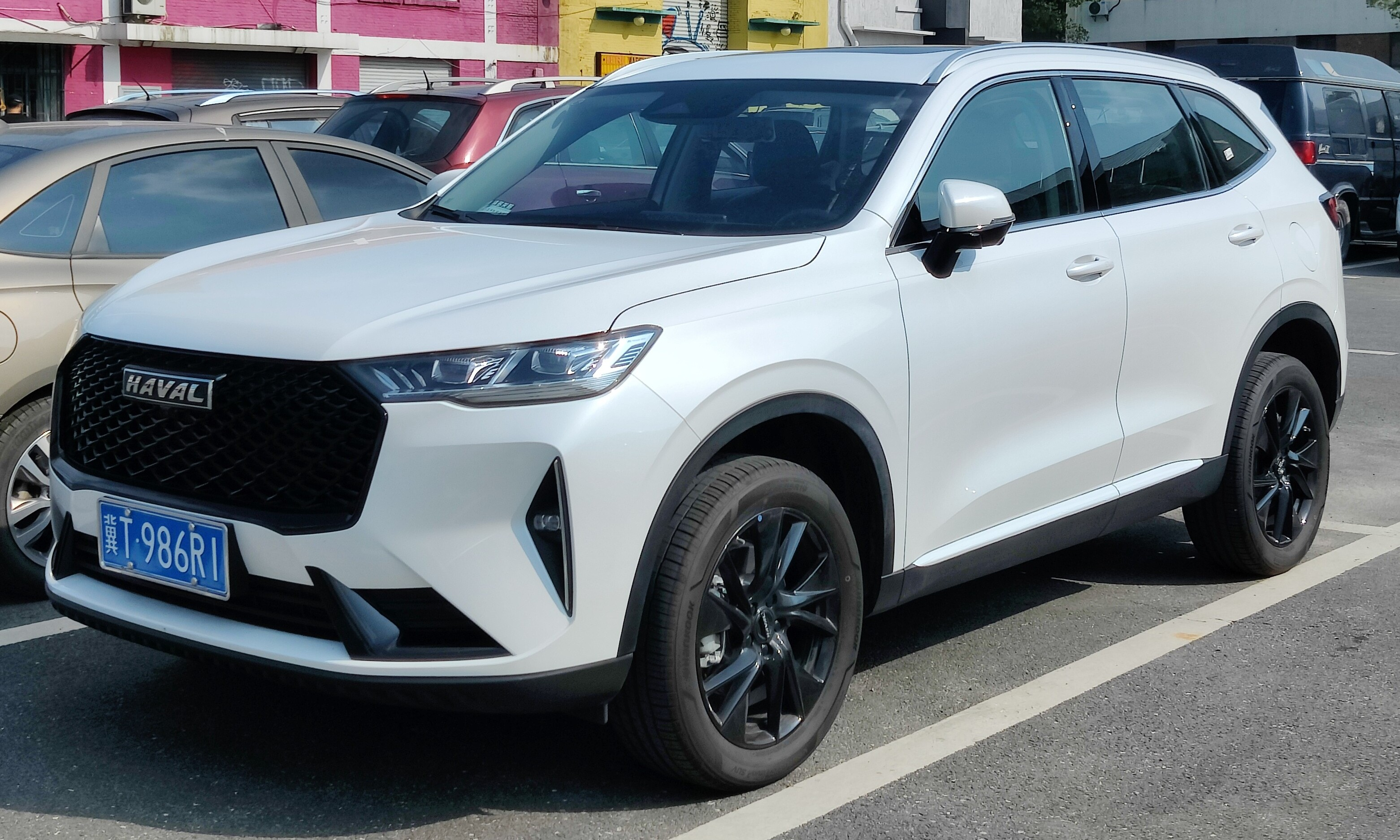
- Third generation Haval H6

Overview
- Also called: Cheval 6 (Iran)
- Production: 2020–present
- Assembly: China: Tianjin; Thailand: Rayong (GWM Thailand); Malaysia: Pegoh, Malacca (EPMB); Pakistan: Lahore (Sazgar); Iran: Tehran (Bahman Group); Brazil: Iracemápolis (GWM Brasil); Uzbekistan: Jizzakh (ADM)
- Designer: Under the lead of Phil Stilo

Body and chassis
- Body style: 5-door SUV; 5-door coupe SUV (H6S / H6 GT)
- Platform: Lemon platform (B30)
- Related: Haval Jolion; Haval Big Dog

Powertrain
- Engine: Petrol: 1.5 L GW4B15 I4 turbo; 1.5 L GW4G15F I4 turbo; 2.0 L GW4C20NT I4 turbo; Petrol hybrid: 1.5 L GWM4B15D I4; 1.5 L GW4B15 GDIT EVO I4 turbo; 2.0 L GW4C20B I4 turbo MHEV; Petrol plug-in hybrid: 1.5 L GW4B15 GDIT EVO I4 turbo
- Electric motor: 134 bhp; 136 PS (100 kW) DHT100 BorgWarner permanent magnet synchronous motor; 174 bhp; 177 PS (130 kW) DHT130 BorgWarner permanent magnet synchronous motor; BSG (belt starter generator)
- Power output: 240 bhp; 243 PS (179 kW) (H6 Hybrid); 208 bhp; 211 PS (155 kW) (H6S 2.0 MHEV); 322 bhp; 326 PS (240 kW) (H6 PHEV); 360 bhp; 365 PS (268.7 kW) (H6 PHEV Hi4 AWD)
- Transmission: 6-speed manual 7-speed DCT; 9-speed DCT; Multi-mode DHT (Hybrid)
- Hybrid drivetrain: MHEV (H6S 2.0); Power-split hybrid (HEV); Plug-in hybrid (PHEV)
- Battery: 1.6 kWh lithium-ion (Hybrid); 27.54 kWh LFP SVOLT (PHEV, Thailand); 34 kWh NMC CATL (PHEV, Thailand); 35.4 kWh NMC CATL (PHEV, China); 45 kWh NMC CATL (PHEV AWD, China); 19.09 kWh LFP (PHEV Hi4 AWD, Pakistan)

Dimensions
- Wheelbase: 2,738 mm (107.8 in)
- Length: 4,653 mm (183.2 in); 4,714 mm (185.6 in) (H6S); 4,703 mm (185.2 in) (2024 Facelift)
- Width: 1,886 mm (74.3 in); 1,940 mm (76.4 in) (H6S)
- Height: 1,730 mm (68.1 in)

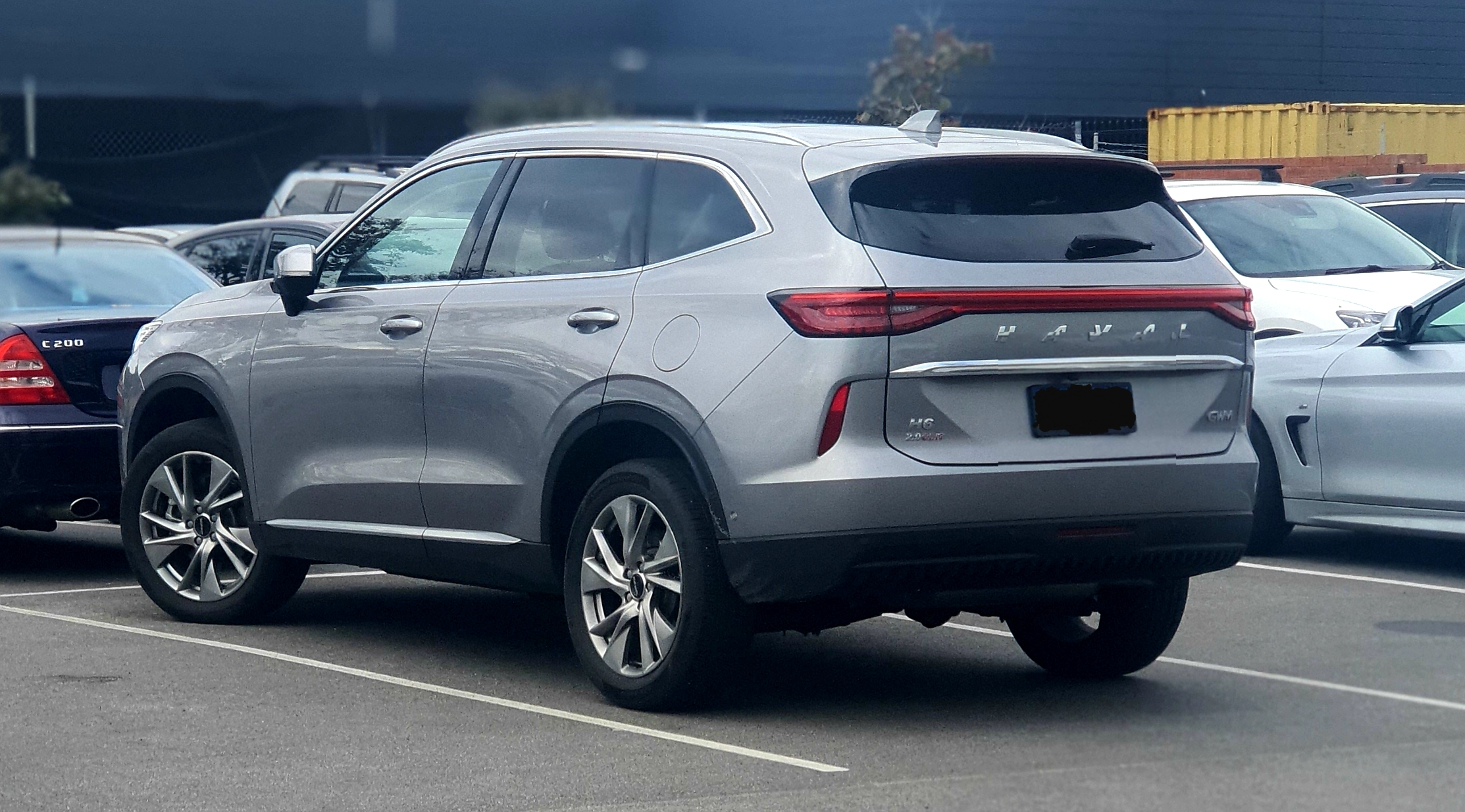
Haval H6 III rear

The third generation Haval H6 has debuted at the Chengdu Motor Show 2020. Haval officially opened pre-sales of the third generation H6 in July 2020.

The third generation H6 is Haval's first model built on the Lemon platform. The new-gen Haval H6 is powered by a 1.5-litre turbo engine or a 2.0-litre turbo engine. The 1.5-litre turbo engine is essentially an upgrade version of current engine with a max power of 169 hp (126 kW; 171 PS) and a torque of 285 N⋅m (210 lb⋅ft; 29 kg⋅m). The 2.0-litre turbo engine is a newly developed engine from GWM, with a 38% thermal efficiency, while delivering maximum power of 224 hp (167 kW; 227 PS) and a torque of 385 N⋅m (284 lb⋅ft; 39 kg⋅m). The gearbox of the third generation H6 is a 9-speed dual-clutch transmission.

=== Haval H6 Supreme+ Edition ===
A variant of the third generation H6 was launched during the 2021 Shanghai Auto Show called the Haval H6 5G Edition. The H6 5G Edition is equipped with 5G internet provided by China Mobile, and features a restyled front end. Additionally, facial recognition and FOTA would also be featured.

The model was later launched as the H6 Supreme+ edition during the 2021 Chengdu Auto Show as a 10-year anniversary special edition model. The model is equipped with the same powertrain options as the base H6 model and features a restyled front fascia design.

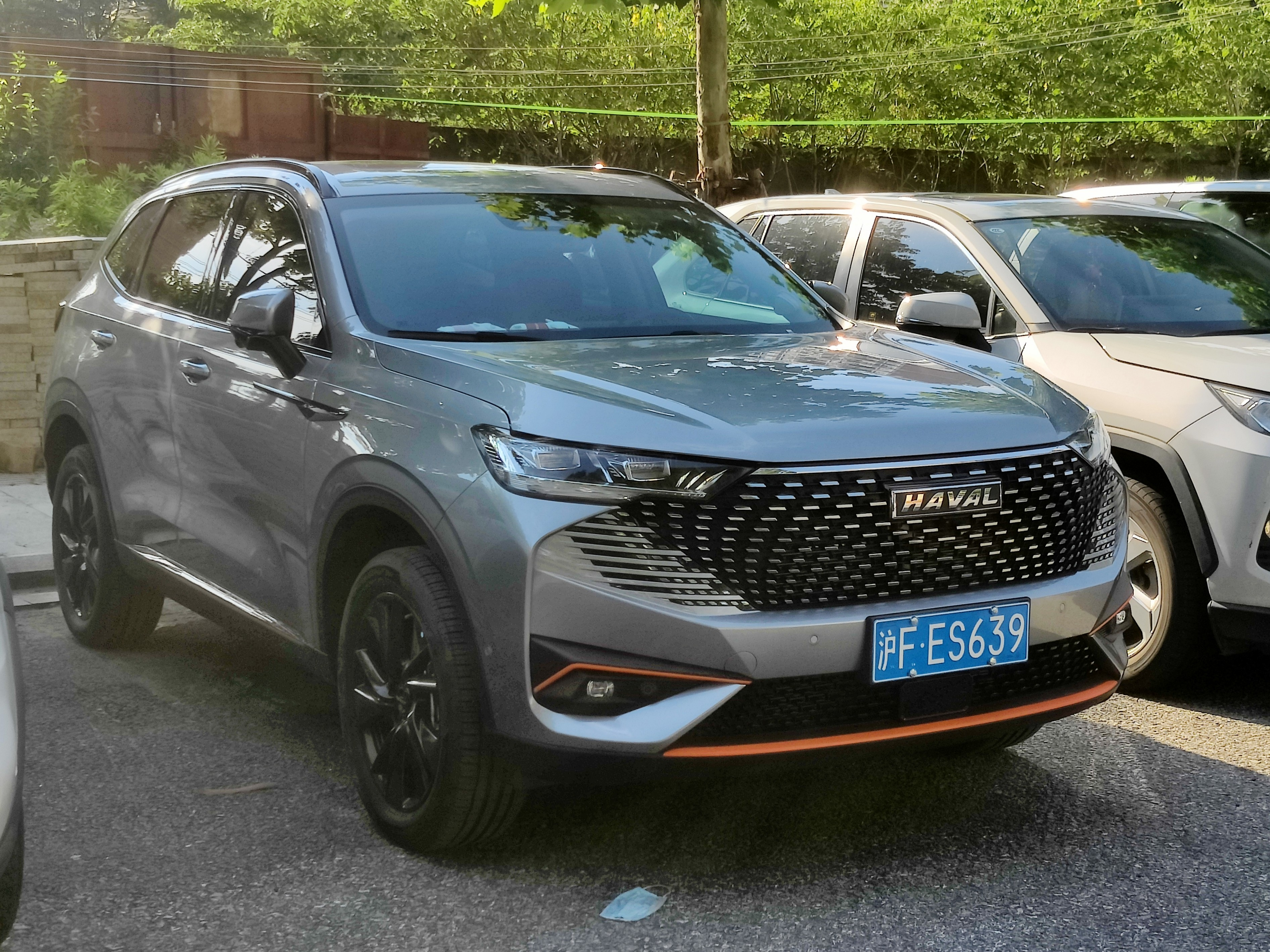
Haval H6 5G Edition front

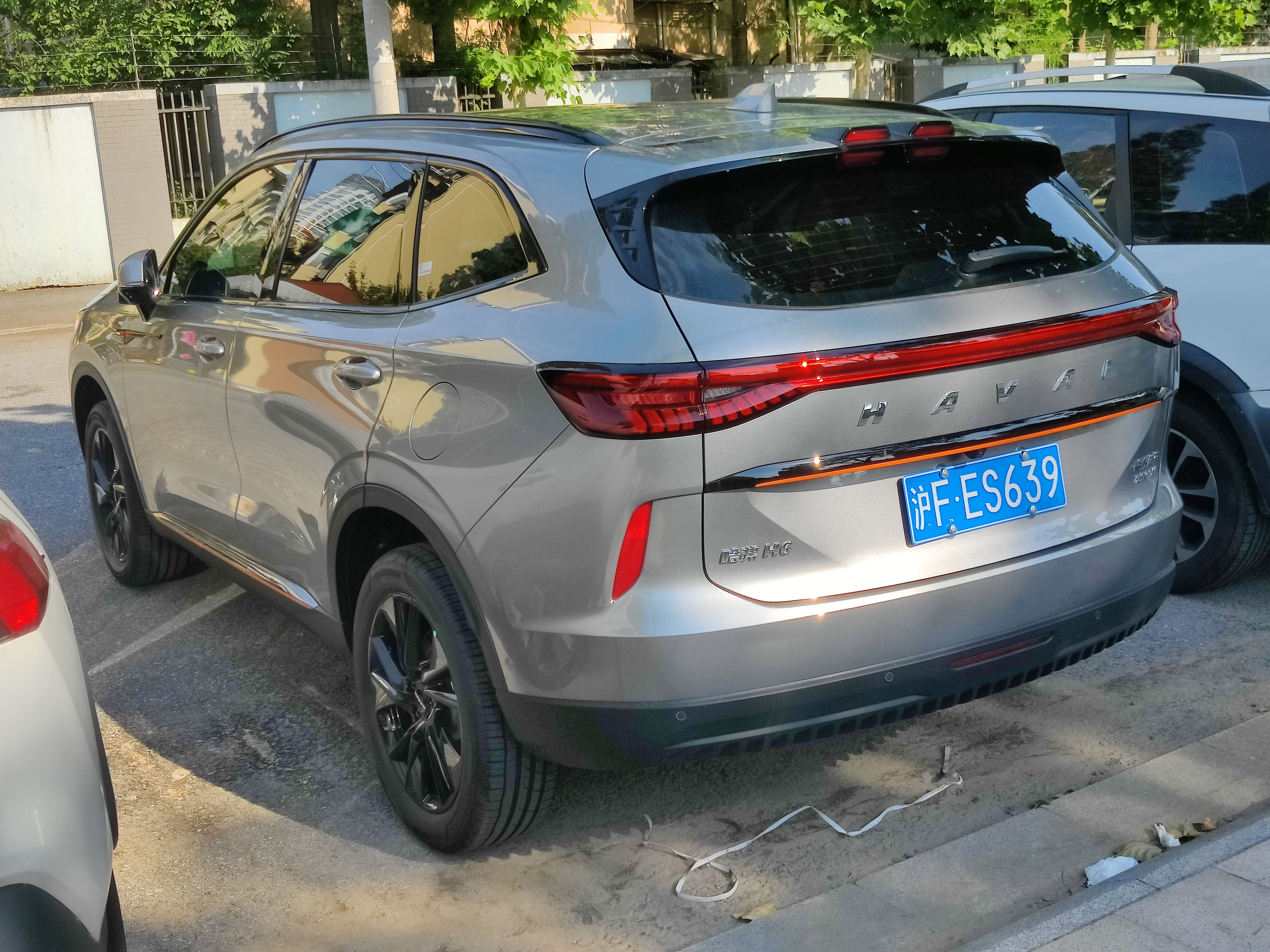
Haval H6 5G Edition rear

=== Haval H6 Vance Edition ===
A special edition (optional of the car bodykits) of the H6 called the H6 Vance was offered in Brunei in June 2022.

The Brunei-market Haval H6 Vance comes with custom front and rear bumper, skirts, rear spoiler, carbon cover for side mirrors, front chrome and rear chrome strip. Customers in the country can opt for black rims, calipers colours and black pack for cosmetic changes.

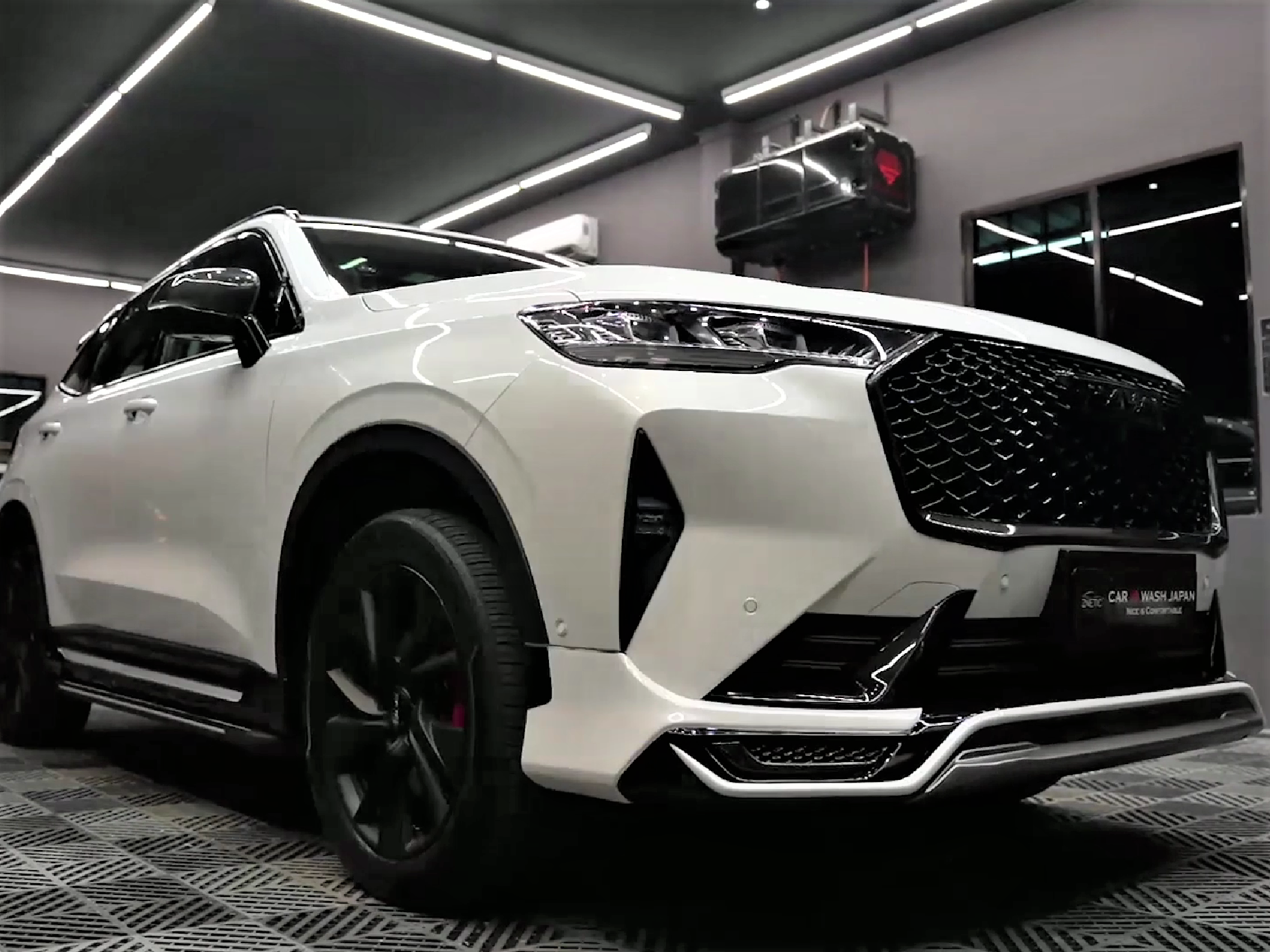
Haval H6 Vance front

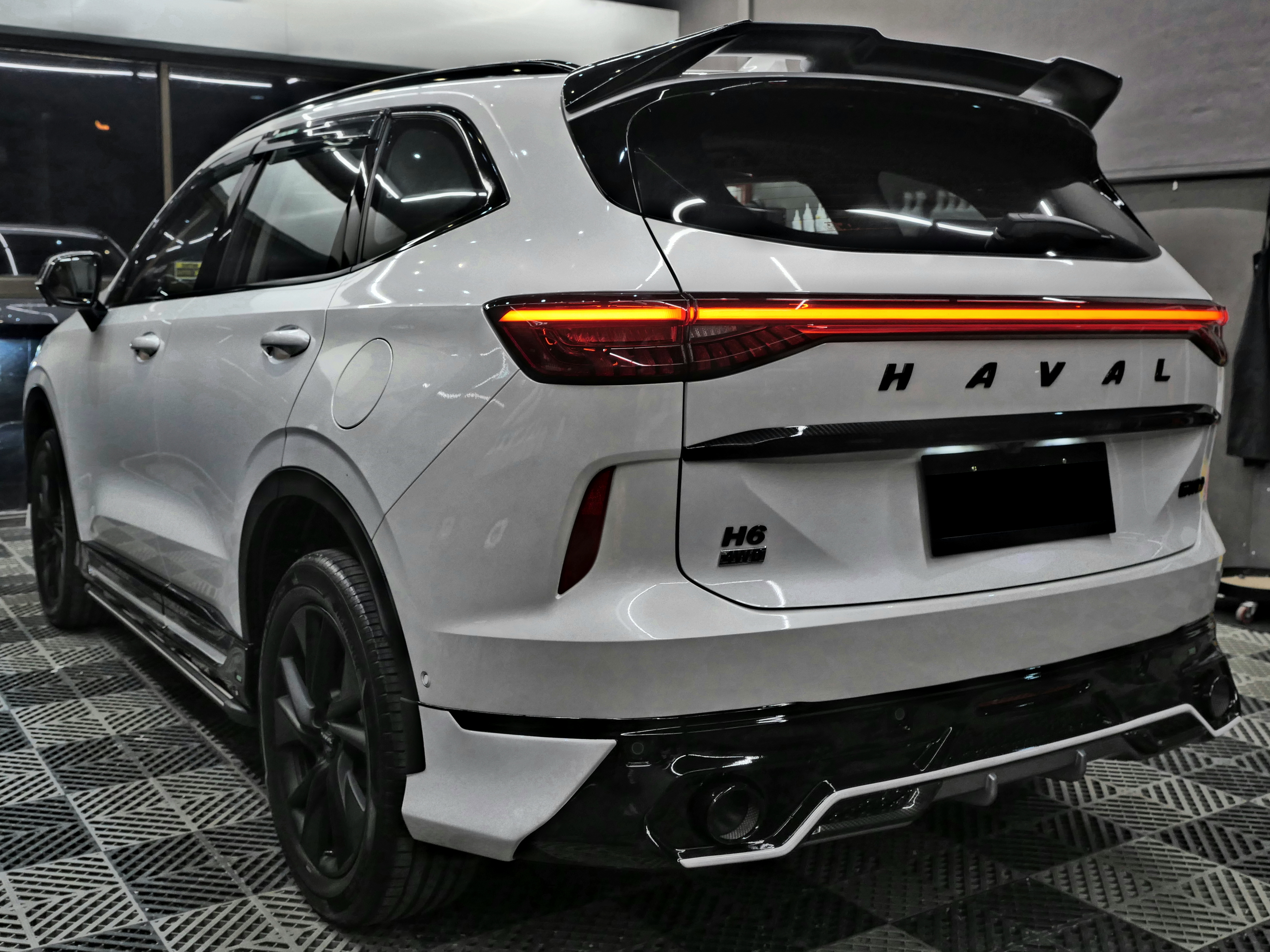
Haval H6 Vance rear

=== Haval H6S / H6 GT ===
A fastback variant of the third generation H6 was unveiled in August 2021 called the Haval H6S.

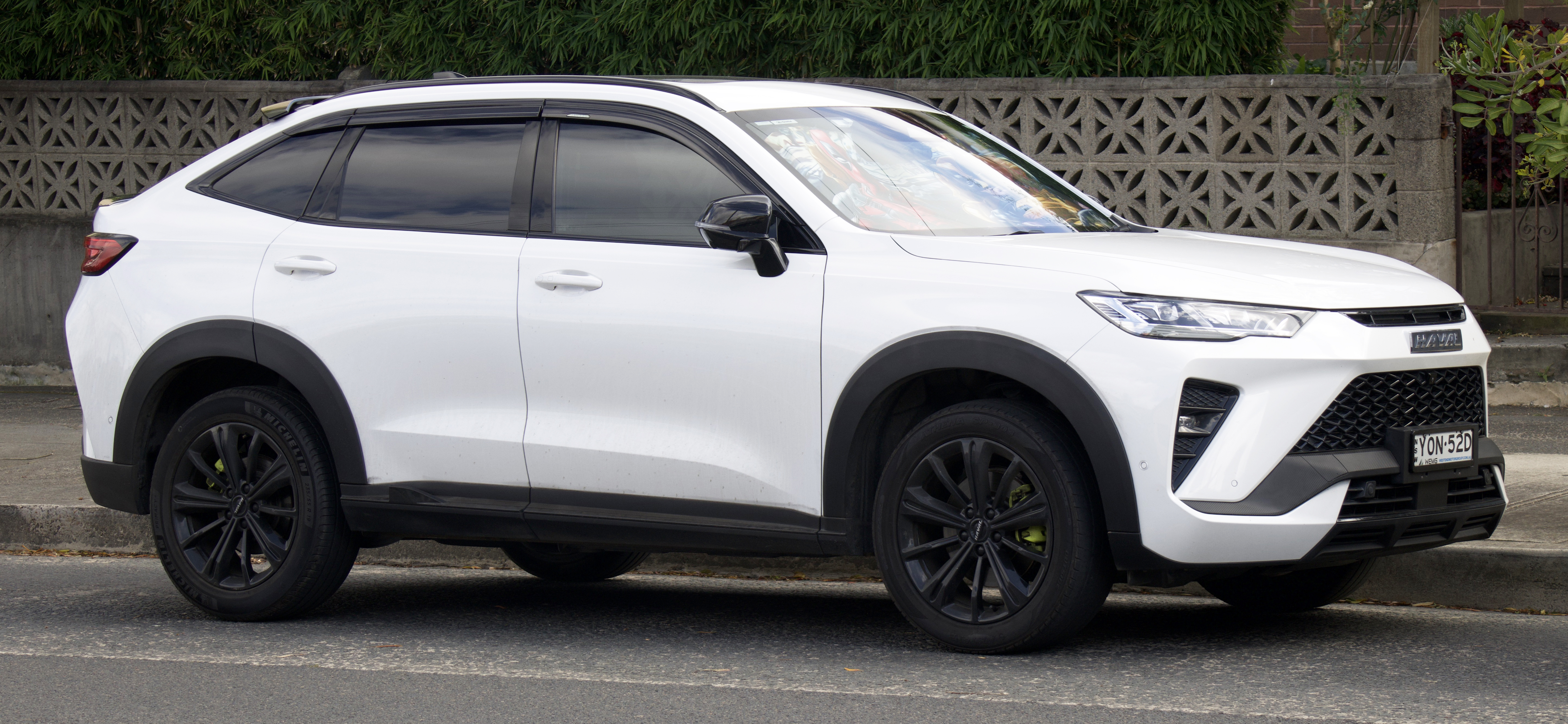
Haval H6 GT (pre-facelift)

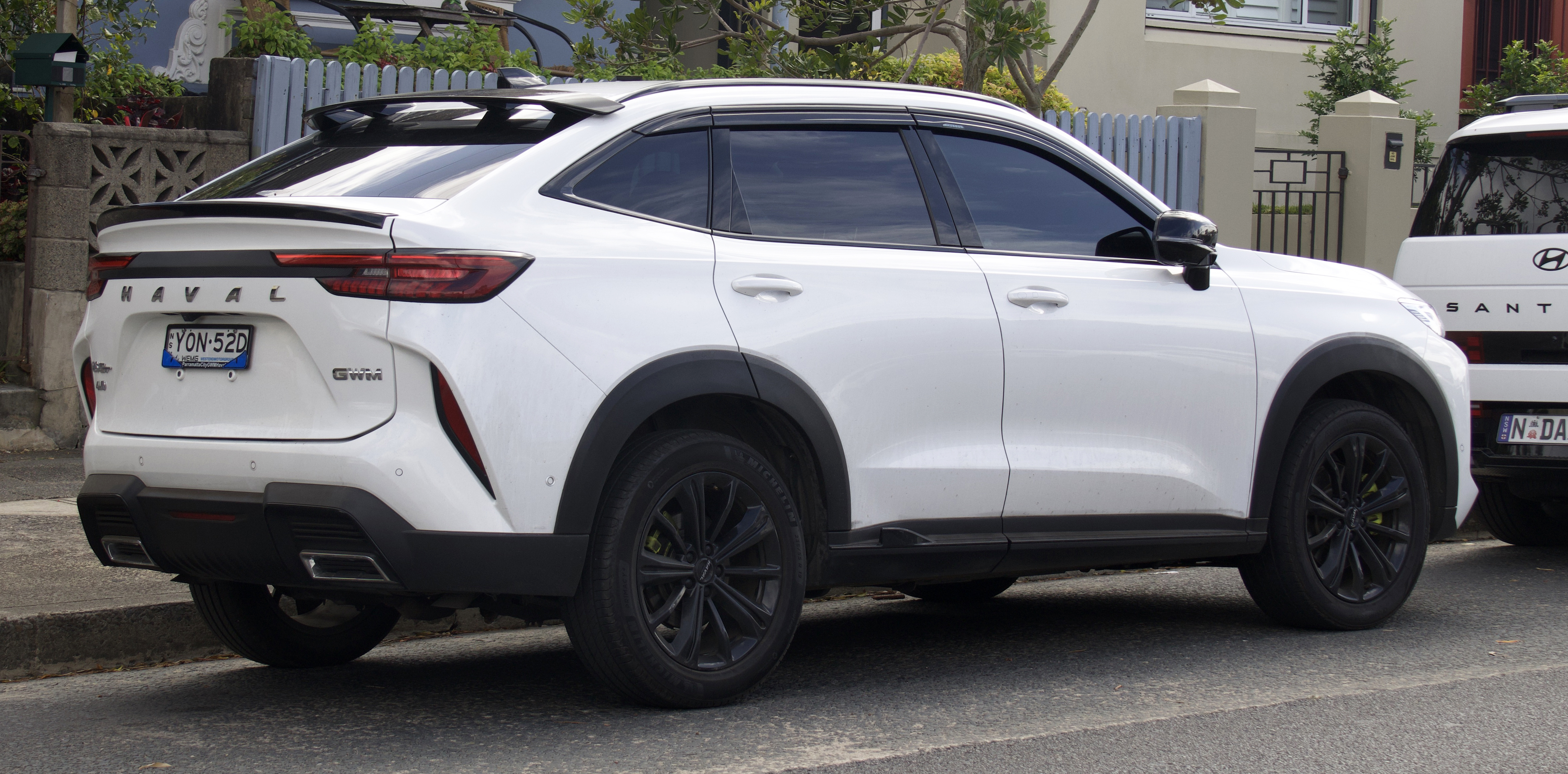
rear view

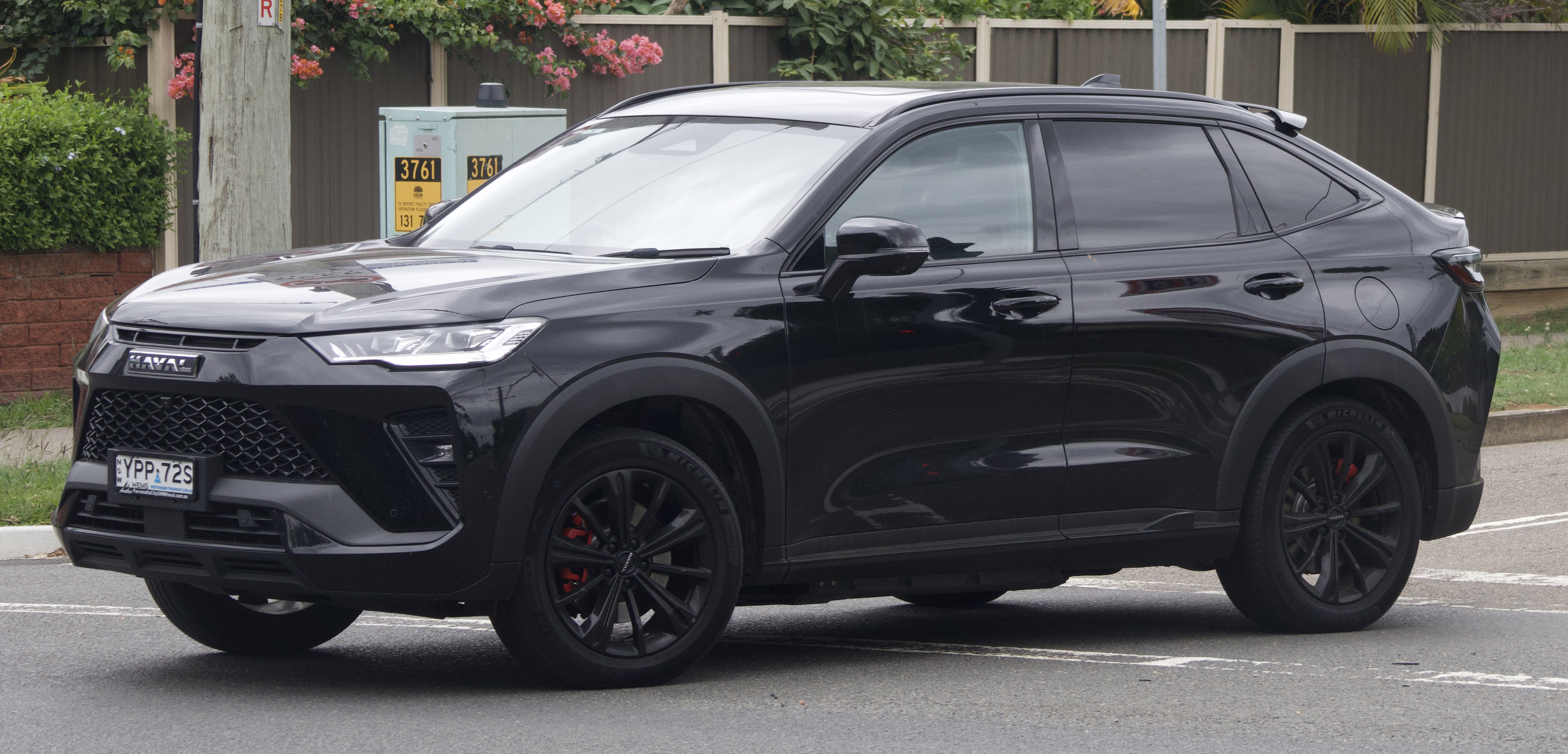
Haval H6 GT (facelift)

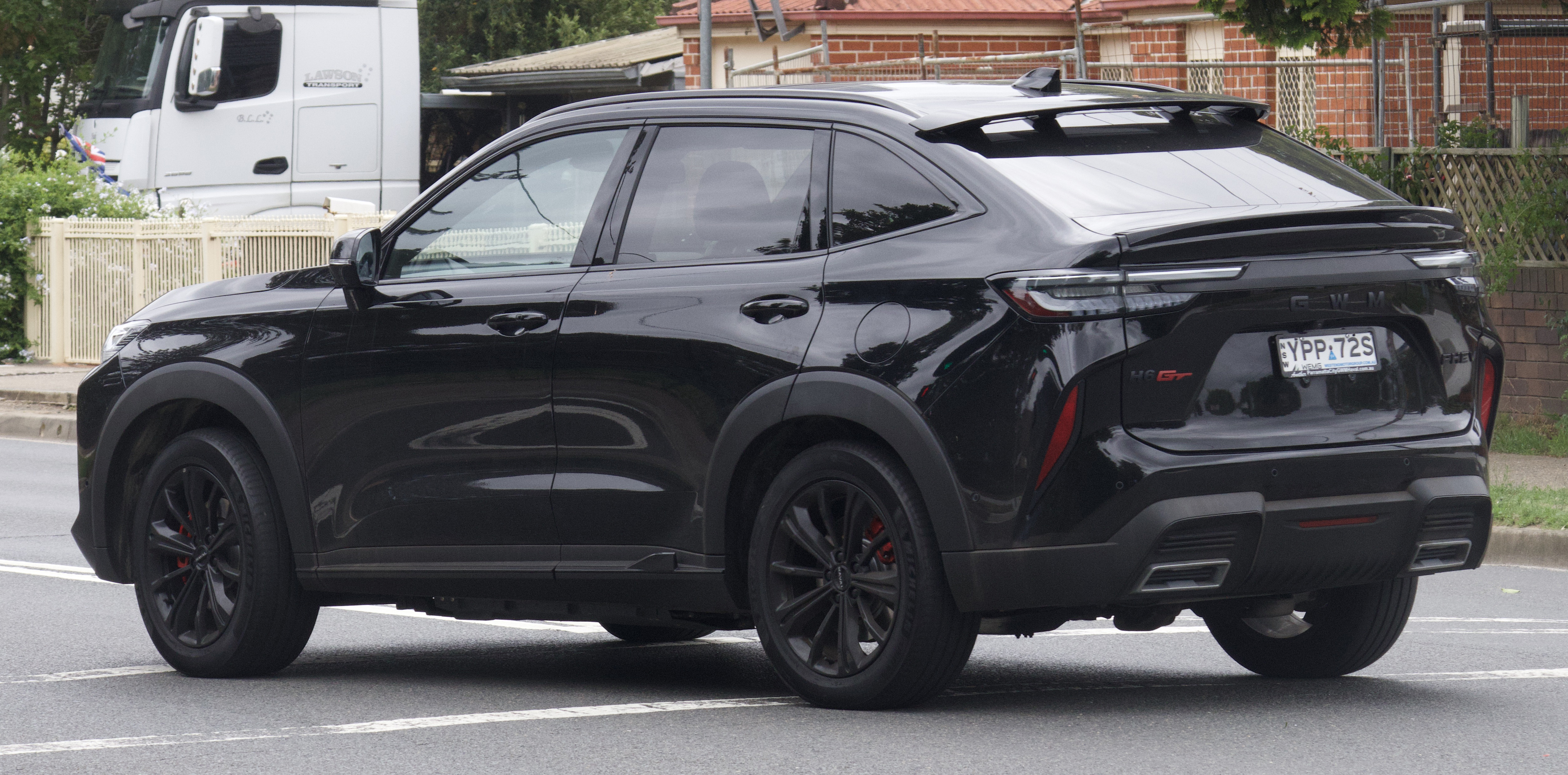
rear view

=== Haval H6 HEV ===
The hybrid variant of the H6 debuted at the 2021 Bangkok international Motor Show in March 2021. It is powered by a 1.5-litre turbo GW4B15 engine which produces 123 kW (165 hp; 167 PS) and 285 N⋅m (29 kg⋅m; 210 lb⋅ft) of torque. It is also powered by a 130 kW (174 hp; 177 PS) electric motor paired with a 7-speed DCT gearbox with a combined power of 243 PS (179 kW; 240 hp) and 391 lb⋅ft; 54 kg⋅m (530 N⋅m) of torque.

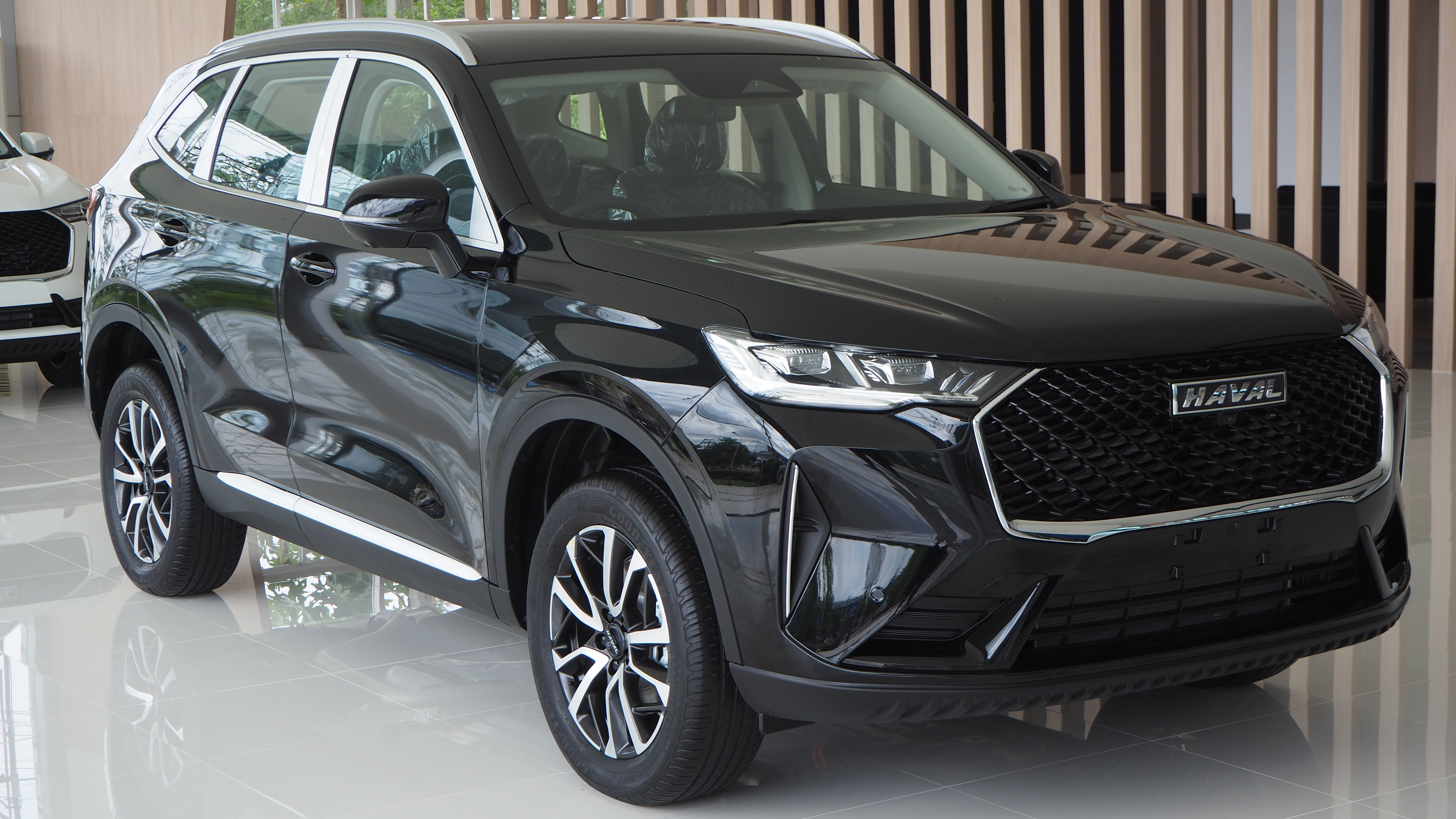
Haval H6 HEV (pre-facelift)

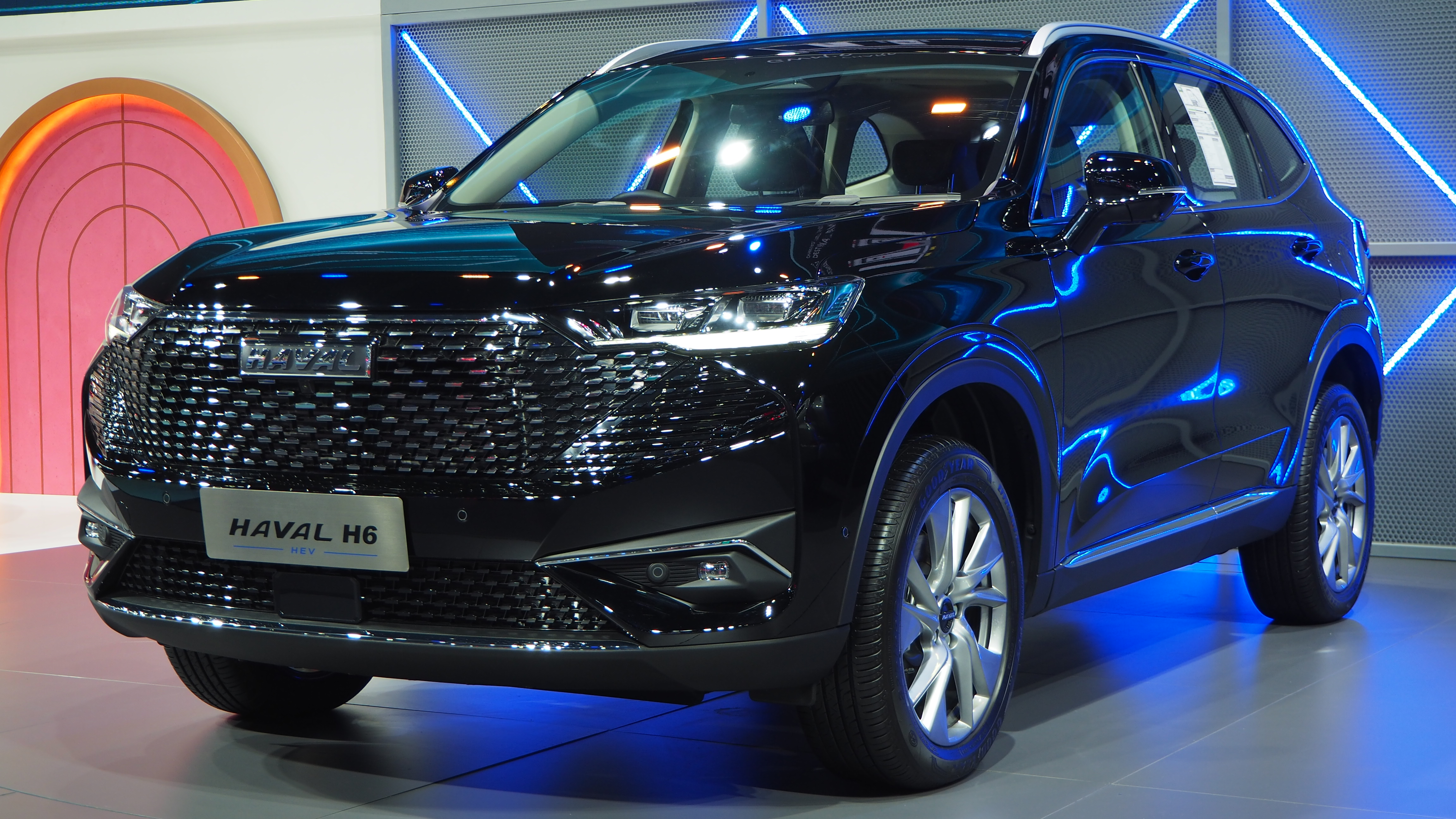
Haval H6 HEV (facelift)

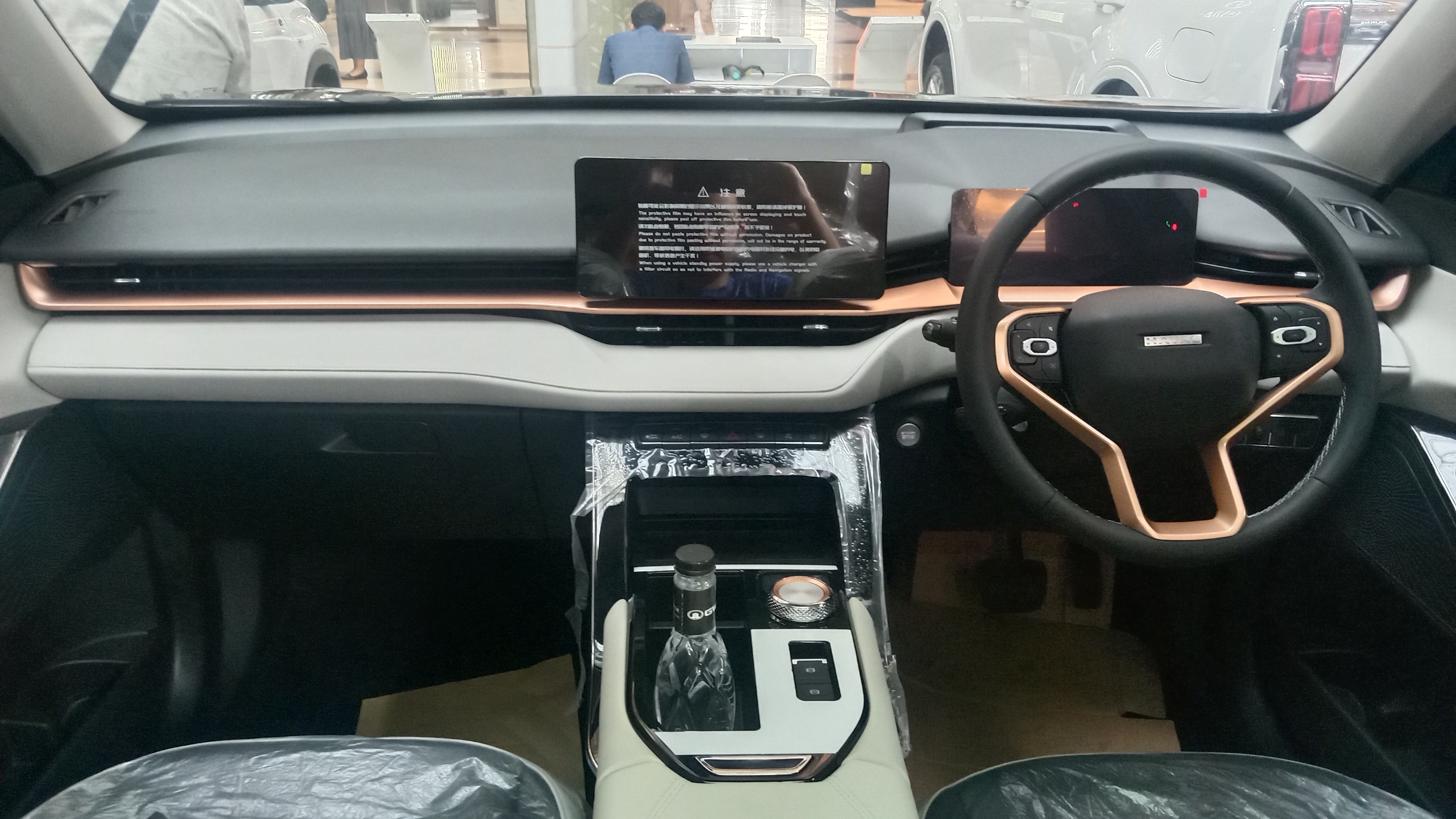
Interior

=== Haval H6 PHEV ===
A petrol plug-in hybrid variant of the third generation H6 debuted at the 2021 Motor Expo in Thailand in December 2021. The PHEV version has a restyled front fascia with chrome finishing and unique layered vents. On 28 September 2022, the Haval H6 PHEV was officially launched in China.

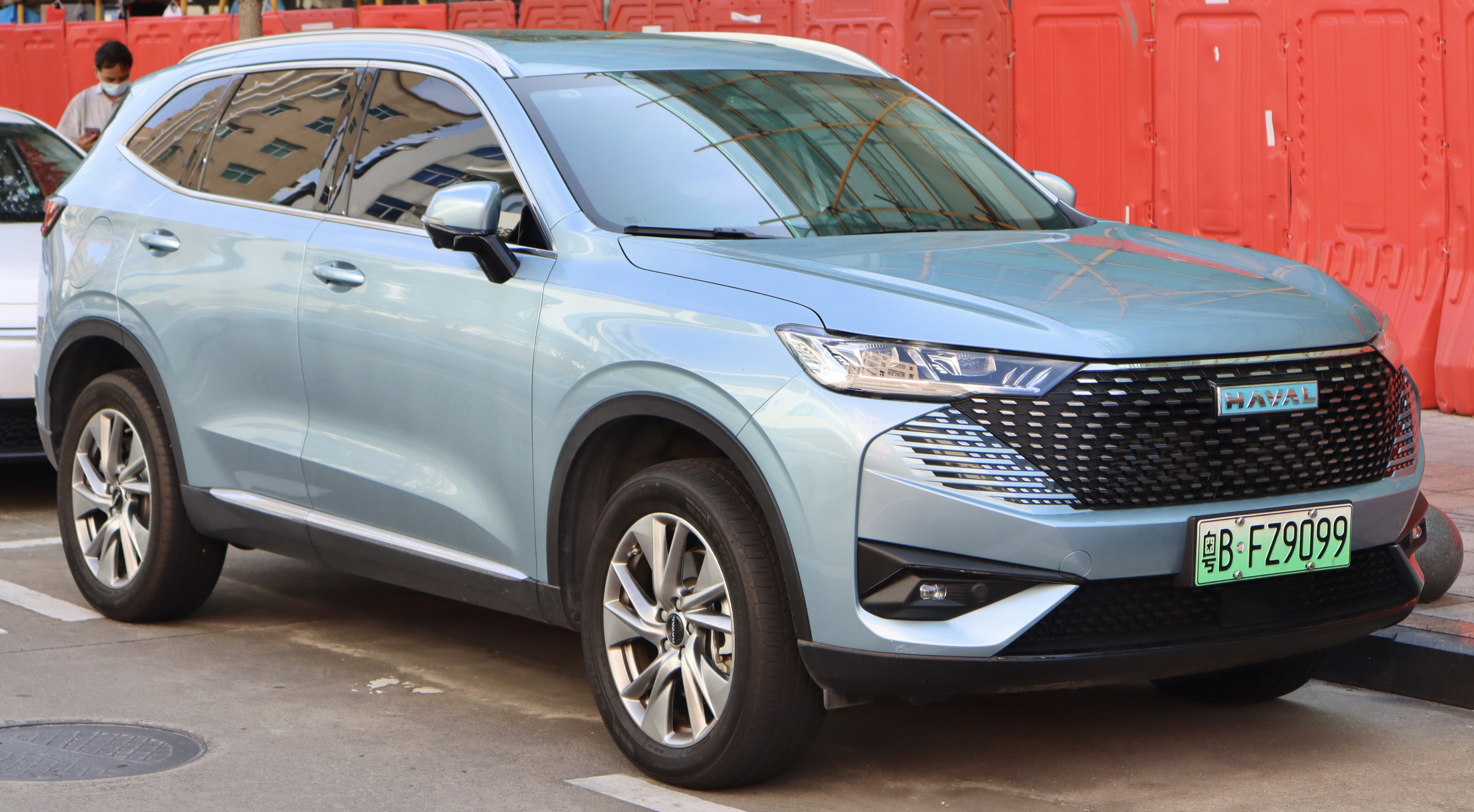
Haval H6 PHEV (front view)

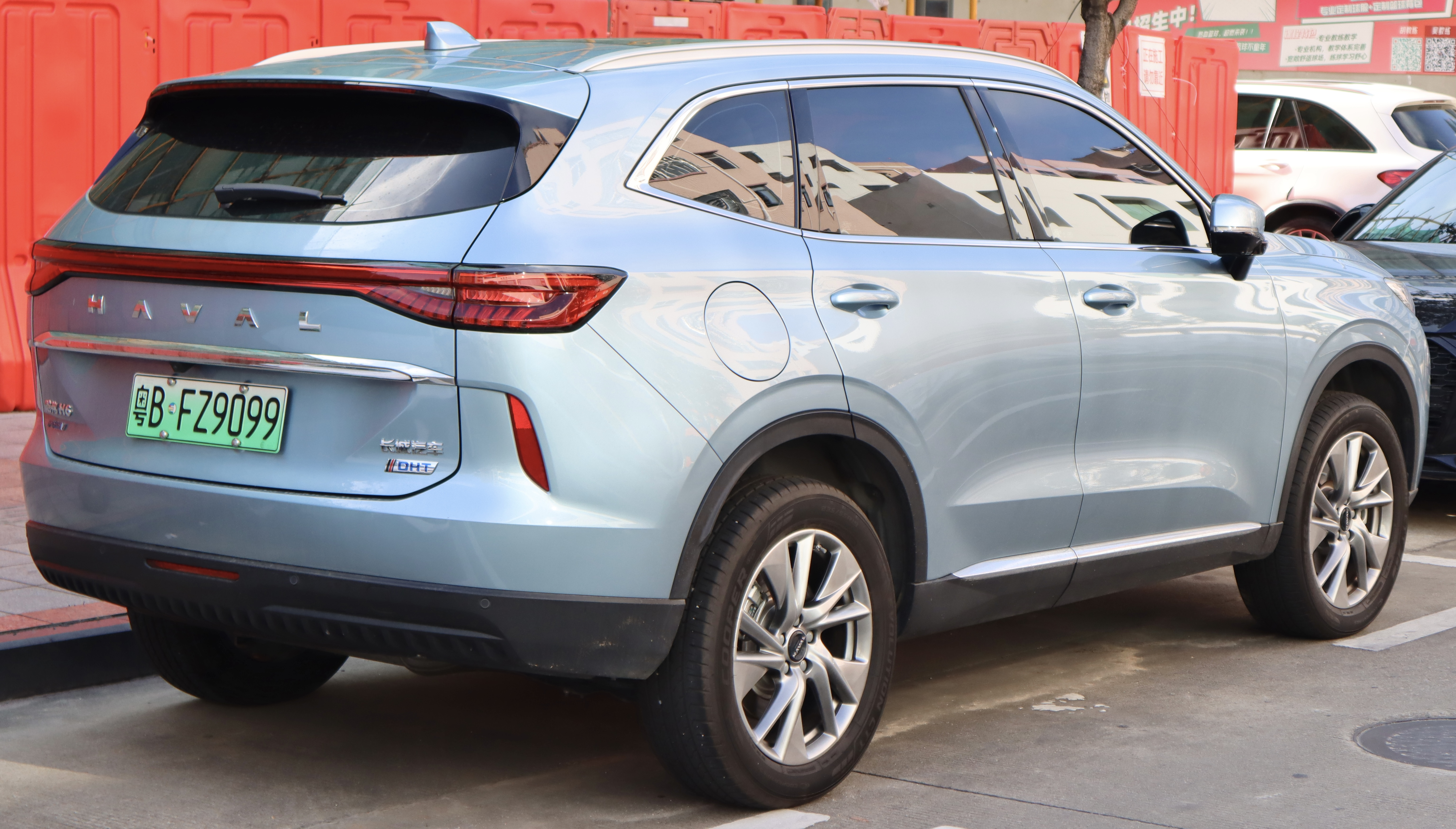
Haval H6 PHEV (rear view)

=== 2024 facelift ===
In July 2023, Haval released a set of images of the facelifted Haval H6 to be released that year. However, this version was never released to the market. A reworked facelift model was introduced in China in April 2024, adopting a new front fascia with vertical LED daytime running lights and a full-width light bar replaced by conventional taillight setup. The overall length was increased to 4703 mm while maintaining the same width, height and wheelbase. The interior was revised with a redesigned center console, a 50W wireless charger, memory seats, a column style drive selector. A redesigned 2-spoke steering wheel was also offered on the higher trim levels. The infotainment screen was upgraded to a 14.6-inch display, running Coffee OS 3.0.

The facelift version of the H6 PHEV was first globally launched in Lahore, Pakistan on 16 August 2025. It received an intelligent AWD variant utilizing GWM's Hi-4 drivetrain that adds a rear motor, bringing the combined power output to 268 kW (360 bhp) and 760 Nm of torque. It is powered by a 19.09 kWh LFP battery and supports DC charging up to 34 kW, while claiming a combined range of 1000+ km. The Hi-4 AWD variant can go from 0-100 km/h in 4.8 seconds when using the dedicated launch control.

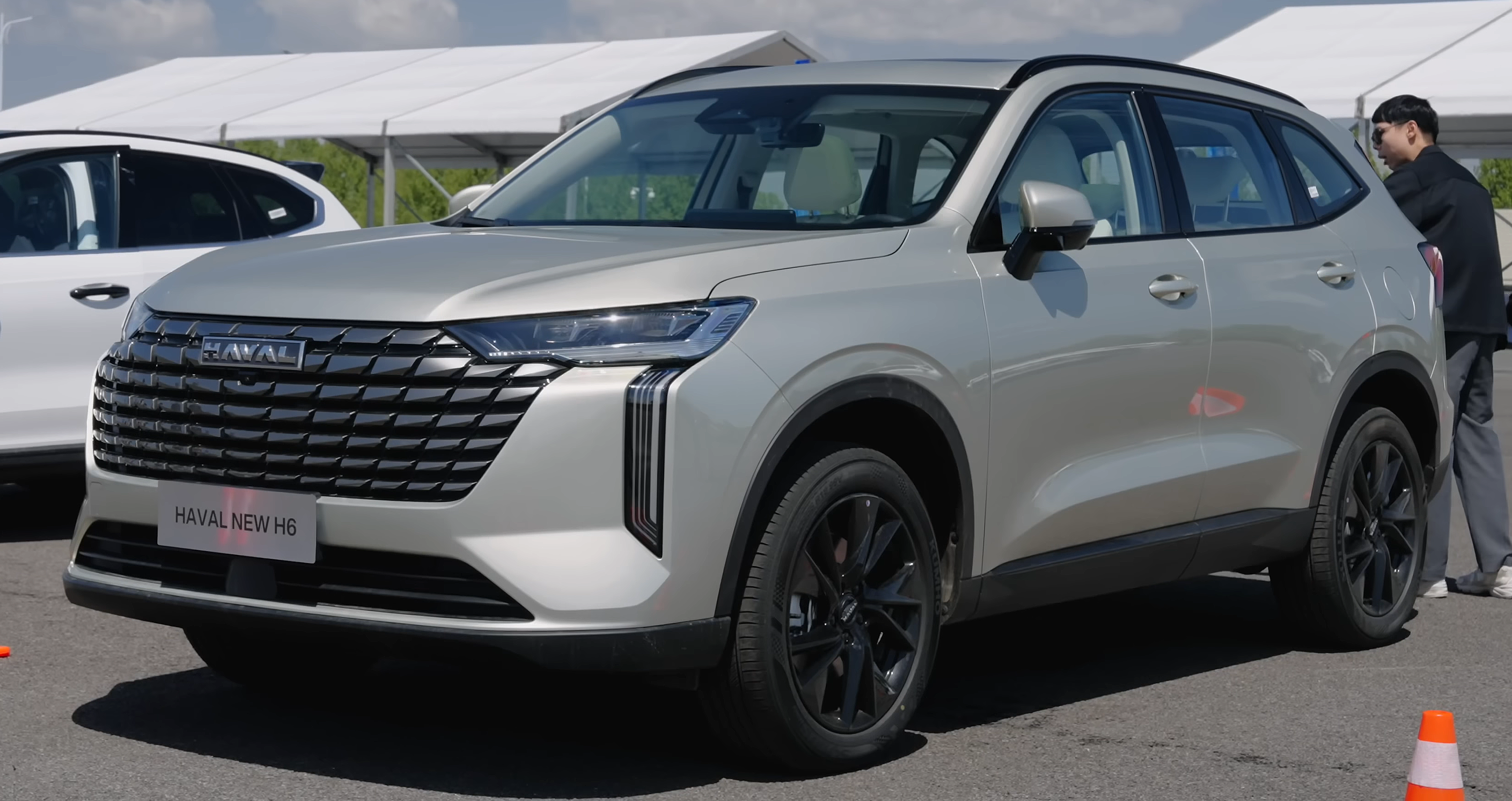
2024 facelift

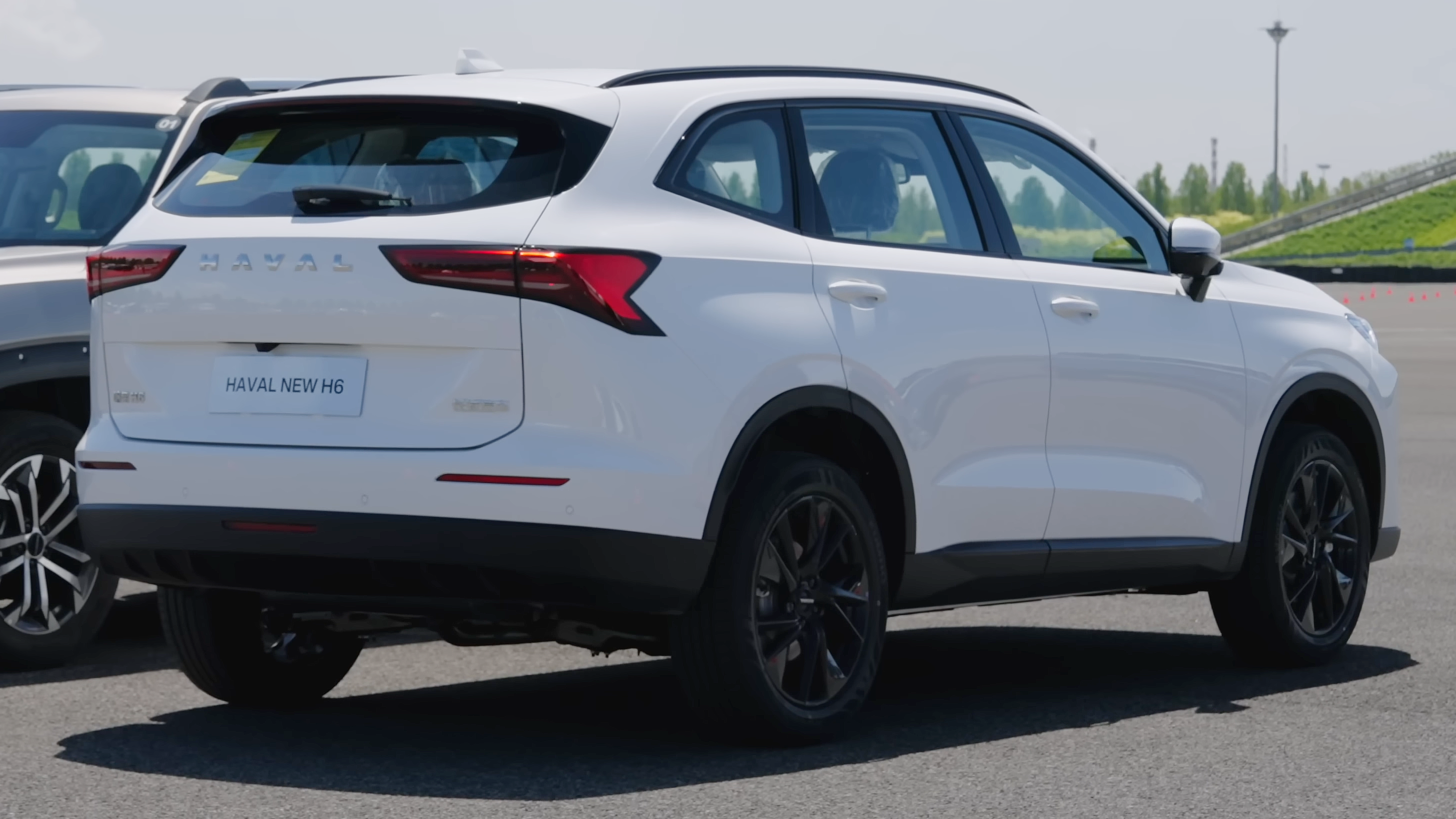
Rear view

== Haval H6L ==
A longer Haval H6L variant based on the Xiaolong Max was introduced in November 2025. Sharing most of the exterior appearance of the 2025 model year Xiaolong Max, it was launched with the sixth generation Great Wall Motor engine technology, and is essentially the internal combustion engine variant of the Xiaolong Max with the power train featuring a 2.0-liter turbo engine producing 175 kW (235 hp; 238 PS) and 385 N⋅m (284 lb⋅ft) mated to a 9-speed dual clutch transmission. 0 to 100 km/h (62 mph) acceleration time is 7.2 seconds and WLTC fuel consumption is 7.4 L/100 km (13.5 km/L; 38.2 mpg_{‑imp}; 31.8 mpg_{‑US}).

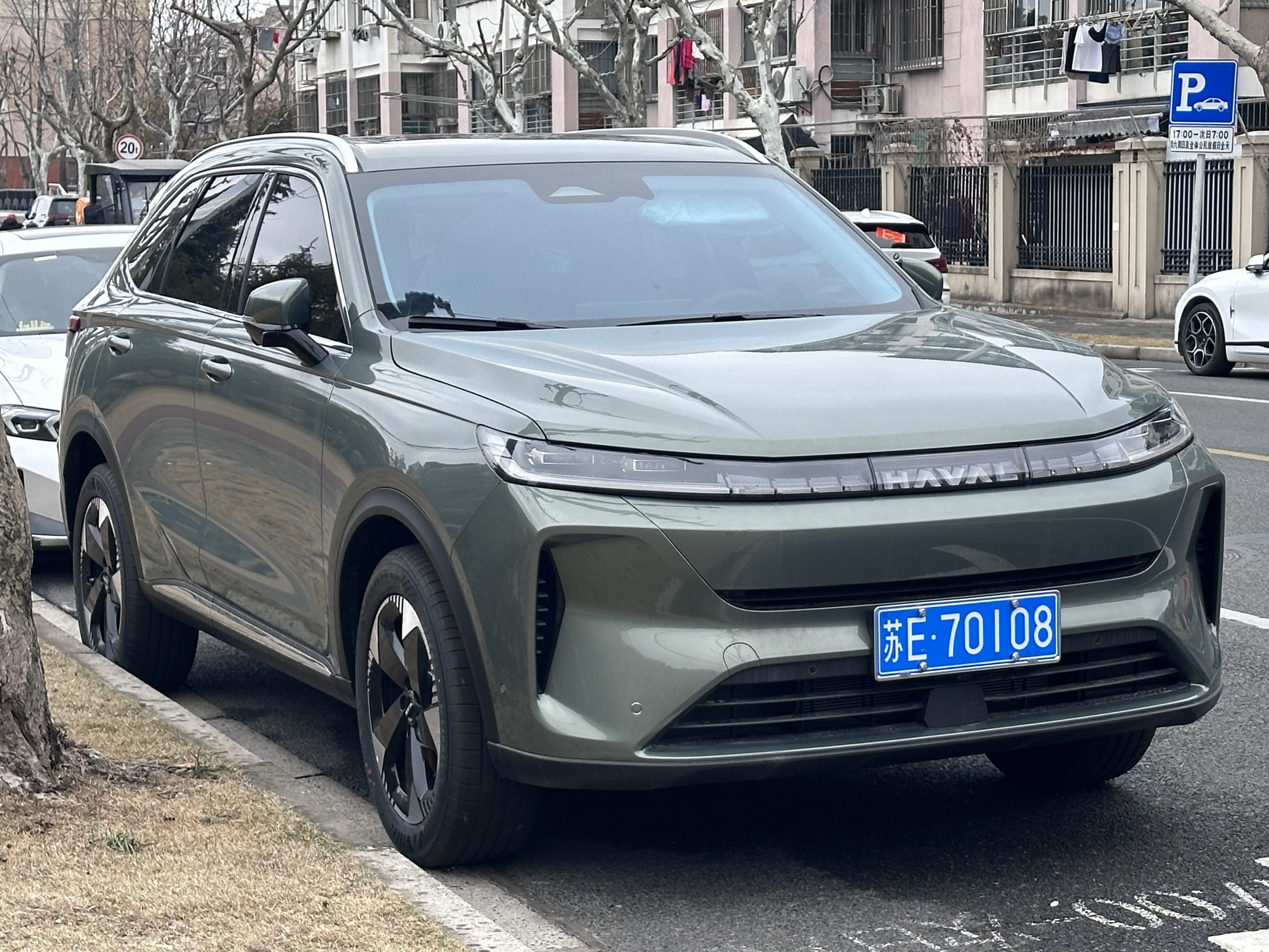
Haval H6L

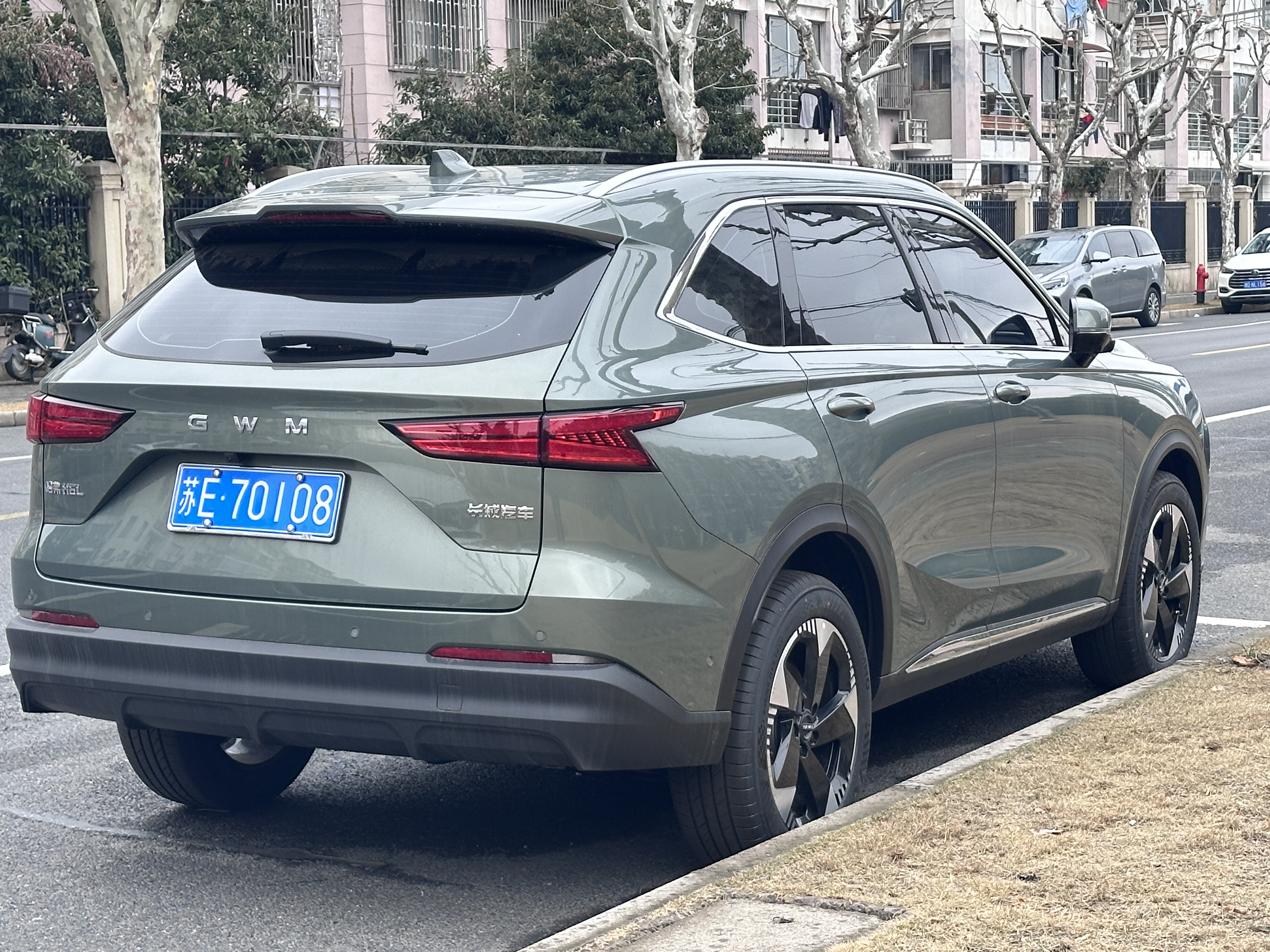
Rear view

=== Markets ===
==== Asia ====
===== Indonesia =====
The Haval H6 was introduced in Indonesia at the 30th Gaikindo Indonesian International Auto Show in August 2023, alongside the Haval Jolion, Ora 03 and Tank 500, marking GWM's entry to the Indonesian market. Pricing was formally revealed with limited sales at the 2024 BCA Expoversary on 2 March 2024. Official sales were commenced on 21 March 2024. Initially imported from Thailand, it is powered by a 1.5-litre turbocharged petrol hybrid engine and is offered in a sole HEV variant.

===== Malaysia =====
The Haval H6 was launched on 9 October 2024, after being previewed at the Malaysia Autoshow in May 2024 alongside the Tank 300. It is available as a sole variant powered by a 1.5-litre HEV turbocharged petrol hybrid powertrain. At launch, the first 100 units sold were fully imported from China before local assembly commenced.

===== Pakistan =====
The Haval H6 was launched by Sazgar in Pakistan in 2021 under a joint venture with Great Wall Motor. Initially, it was imported as a CBU but the local assembly in Pakistan commenced in August 2022. Initially, it was offered in only two trim levels: 1.5T and 2.0T AWD. The 1.5T trim is powered by a 1.5-litre turbocharged petrol engine while the 2.0T AWD trim is powered by a 2.0-litre turbocharged petrol engine. Both trim levels come with 7-speed DCT.

In November 2022, the hybrid variant of the H6 was also launched, making it the first hybrid electric vehicle to be assembled in Pakistan. It is powered by a 1.5-litre HEV turbocharged petrol hybrid powertrain.

In May 2025, Sazgar launched the 2025 facelift models for the H6 in three trim levels - 1.5T, 2.0T AWD and HEV. In August 2025, Sazgar launched the PHEV variant of the facelift H6, featuring GWM's Hi-4 AWD technology.

===== Philippines =====
The Haval H6 was launched in the Philippines on 11 April 2023, as part of GWM's entry to the Philippines. The H6 is available in two trim levels: Supreme and Max, powered by a 1.5-litre HEV turbocharged petrol hybrid powertrain.

===== Thailand =====
The Haval H6 was launched in Thailand on 28 June 2021, in two trim levels: Pro and Ultra, powered by a 1.5-litre HEV turbocharged petrol hybrid powertrain. The turbocharged petrol plug-in hybrid (PHEV) powertrain was added for the Ultra trim in October 2022. The facelifted H6 debuted in March 2025 with three variants: HEV Pro, PHEV Pro and PHEV Ultra.

===== Vietnam =====
The Haval H6 was launched in Vietnam on 2 August 2023, as part of GWM's entry introduction to Vietnam. It is offered in a sole variant powered by a 1.5-litre HEV turbocharged petrol hybrid powertrain.

==== Mexico ====
The Haval H6 was launched in Mexico on 8 September 2023, as part of GWM's entry to Mexico. It is available in two trim levels: Premium and Luxury, powered by a 1.5-litre HEV turbocharged petrol hybrid powertrain.

==== Oceania ====
===== Australia =====
The Haval H6 was launched in Australia on 9 April 2021, in three trim levels: Premium, Lux and Ultra. All variants are powered by a 2.0-litre turbocharged petrol engine and the all-wheel drive (4WD) option is available only for the top trim. The HEV powertrain was added for the Ultra trim in April 2022. The HEV Luxe variant was added in April 2023. The facelifted H6 was launched in Australia on 1 July 2025, with the same trim levels and powertrain options from the pre-facelift model. For the facelift model, the Premium trim was discontinued and the turbocharged petrol plug-in hybrid (PHEV) powertrain option was introduced for the Ultra trim, therefore it became the first plug-in hybrid vehicle (PHEV) from Great Wall Motors to be sold in Australia. In September 2025, the HEV Ultra all-wheel drive (Hi4) and PHEV Lux front-wheel drive variants were added to the line-up.

The H6 GT was launched in Australia on 6 July 2022, in two trim levels: Lux (2WD) and Ultra (4WD), powered by the 2.0-litre turbocharged petrol engine. In December 2024, the Lux trim was discontinued and the turbocharged petrol plug-in hybrid (PHEV) powertrain option was made available for the H6 GT.

==== South Africa ====
The Haval H6 was launched in South Africa on 7 June 2021, with three trim levels available: Premium, Luxury and Super Luxury. All variants are powered by a 2.0-litre turbocharged petrol engine and the all-wheel drive (4WD) option is available for the Luxury and Super Luxury trims. In September 2022, 1.5-litre HEV turbocharged petrol hybrid powertrain in the Ultra Luxury trim was also added for the H6 range. The facelifted H6 was launched in South Africa on 19 June 2025, with three trim levels: Luxury, Super Luxury and Ultra Luxury, with either 2.0-litre turbocharged petrol (available with the all-wheel drive option) or 1.5-litre HEV turbocharged petrol hybrid powertrains. In March 2026, the H6 became available with the turbocharged petrol plug-in hybrid (PHEV) powertrain for the Ultra Luxury trim, with two-wheel drive (2WD) and four-wheel drive (4WD) options.

The H6 GT was launched in South Africa on 2 September 2022, in the sole Super Luxury trim, powered by a 2.0-litre turbocharged petrol engine with all-wheel drive (4WD). The H6 GT was updated and new features were added in November 2024. In June 2025, the H6 GT became available with the turbocharged petrol plug-in hybrid (PHEV) powertrain for the Ultra Luxury trim, replaced the Super Luxury trim which used the 2.0-litre turbocharged petrol engine, therefore it became the first plug-in hybrid vehicle (PHEV) from Great Wall Motors to be sold in South Africa.

=== Records ===
The Haval H6 HEV was officially listed in the ASEAN Records for achieving the longest range on a single tank of fuel. During the challenge, a total of 38 H6 HEV owners successfully crossed the 1,000 km (620 miles) mark without refuelling stops, with the longest verified distance recorded at 1,242 km (772 miles). According to GWM Malaysia, this achievement made the H6 the first hybrid SUV in the ASEAN region to reach such a milestone through real-world driving conditions.

“This isn’t just a technical breakthrough, it’s a real-world endorsement of how far the HAVAL H6 HEV can take Malaysians. It reflects the essence of our new direction: to elevate the everyday drive through proven innovation,” said Cui Anqi, managing director of GWM Malaysia.

=== Safety ===
In March 2022, the Haval H6 in its Australasian market configuration was awarded a five star rating by ANCAP (aligned with Euro NCAP).

ANCAP test results GWM Haval H6 (2022, aligned with Euro NCAP)
Test	Points	%
Overall:	5 /5 stars	
Adult occupant:	34.22	90%
Child occupant:	43.55	88%
Pedestrian:	39.45	73%
Safety assist:	13.06	81%

== Sales ==
Year	China		Australia		Brazil	South Africa	Thailand	Mexico
Year	H6	PHEV	H6	H6 GT	Brazil	South Africa	Thailand	Mexico
2012	112,262							—
2013	217,842							—
2014	315,881							—
2015	373,229							—
2016	580,683							—
2017	505,944							—
2018	452,552							—
2019	386,405							—
2020	376,864							—
2021	376,158		3,635				795	—
2022	246,810		7,009			4,771	4,135	—
2023	214,304	8,119	8,971	4,100	10,704	5,674	2,929	480
2024	144,537	754	8,973	3,443	22,889	4,218	1,024	3,378
2025	91,646	5			33,400			2,771
