= Automotive industry in Bulgaria =

Bulgaria's production strongly depended on auto imports from the Soviet bloc earlier and currently depends on other European and Asian countries. Presently, Bulgaria introduced what is considered to be its own domestic supercar company, SIN Cars and armed automobiles SAMARM.

== History ==
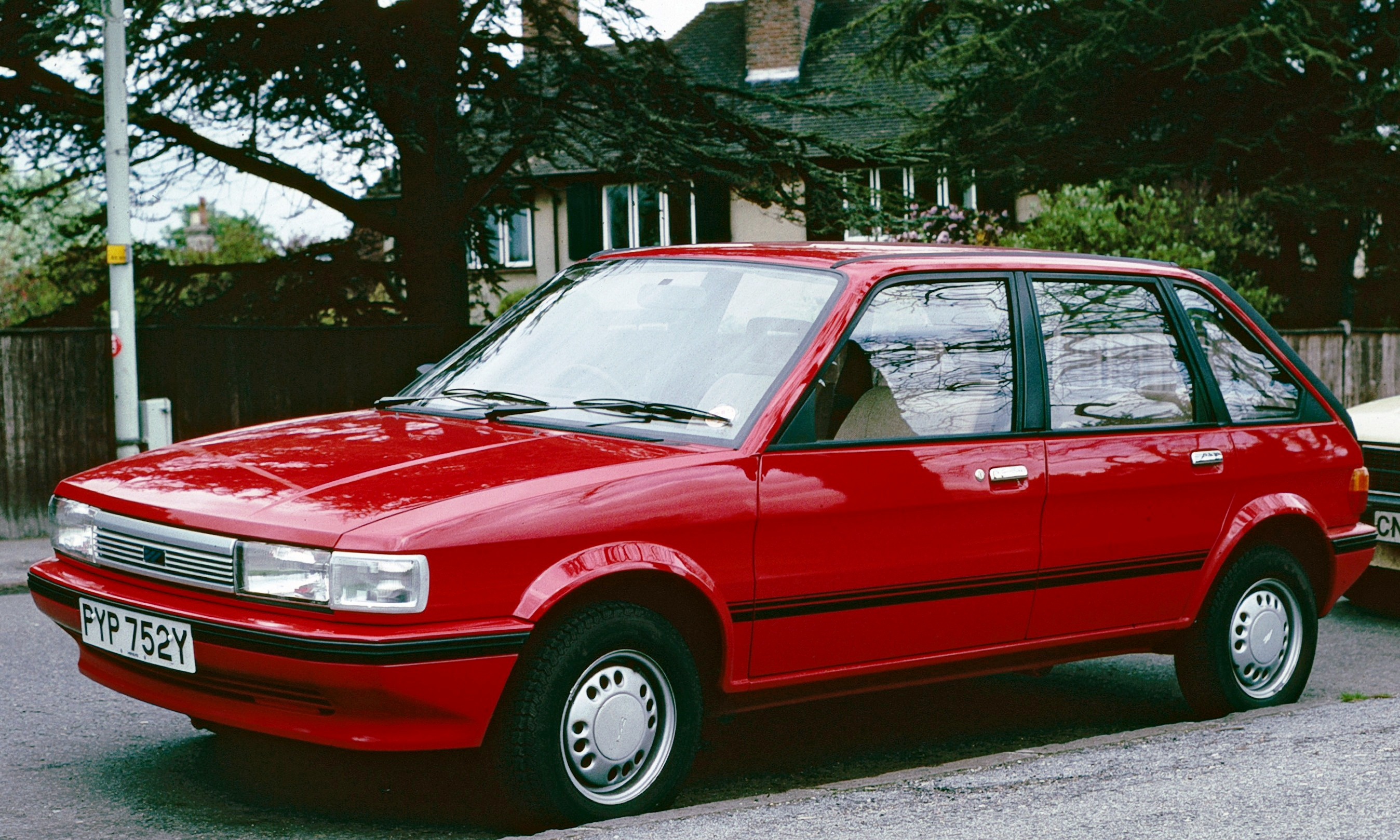
Austin Maestro

Socialist Bulgaria had a small auto industry including nearly 20 thousand units of self-developed Chavdar trucks and buses as well as the assembly of Soviet Moskvitch cars.

From 1966 to 1970 in the city of Plovdiv the Bulgarrenault was produced. The factory assembled the Renault 8 and Renault 10.
Bulgaria produced the Fiat 850 and Fiat 124 between 1967 and 1971. They were unofficially called "Pirin-FIATs". The plant was in the town of Lovech. The same factory, called "Balkan", also assembled Moskvitchs from 1967 to 1988.

In 1994, Rover established Rodacar, a joint venture with a Bulgarian company to produce the Austin Maestro at a new factory in Varna, using CKD kits sent from the UK. Production began in July 1995 and 2,200 cars were assembled before the factory closed in April 1996.

In 2012, what is considered to be Bulgaria's first domestic supercar manufacturer, SIN Cars, was founded as SIN Cars Limited by the Bulgarian engineer and racing driver Rosen Daskalov in Ruse, Bulgaria. The road-legal SIN R1 is powered by a choice of a 6.2-litre V8 or 7.0 litre V8 engine.

Together with the Bulgarian company Litex Motors, Great Wall Motors has a production base in Bahovitsa, near Lovech. They assembly Voleex, Steed and Hover. The factory has an auto assembly capability of 50,000 vehicles annually. There are plans to increase to 70,000 vehicles annually in the next few years.

== Current manufacturers ==
=== SIN Cars ===
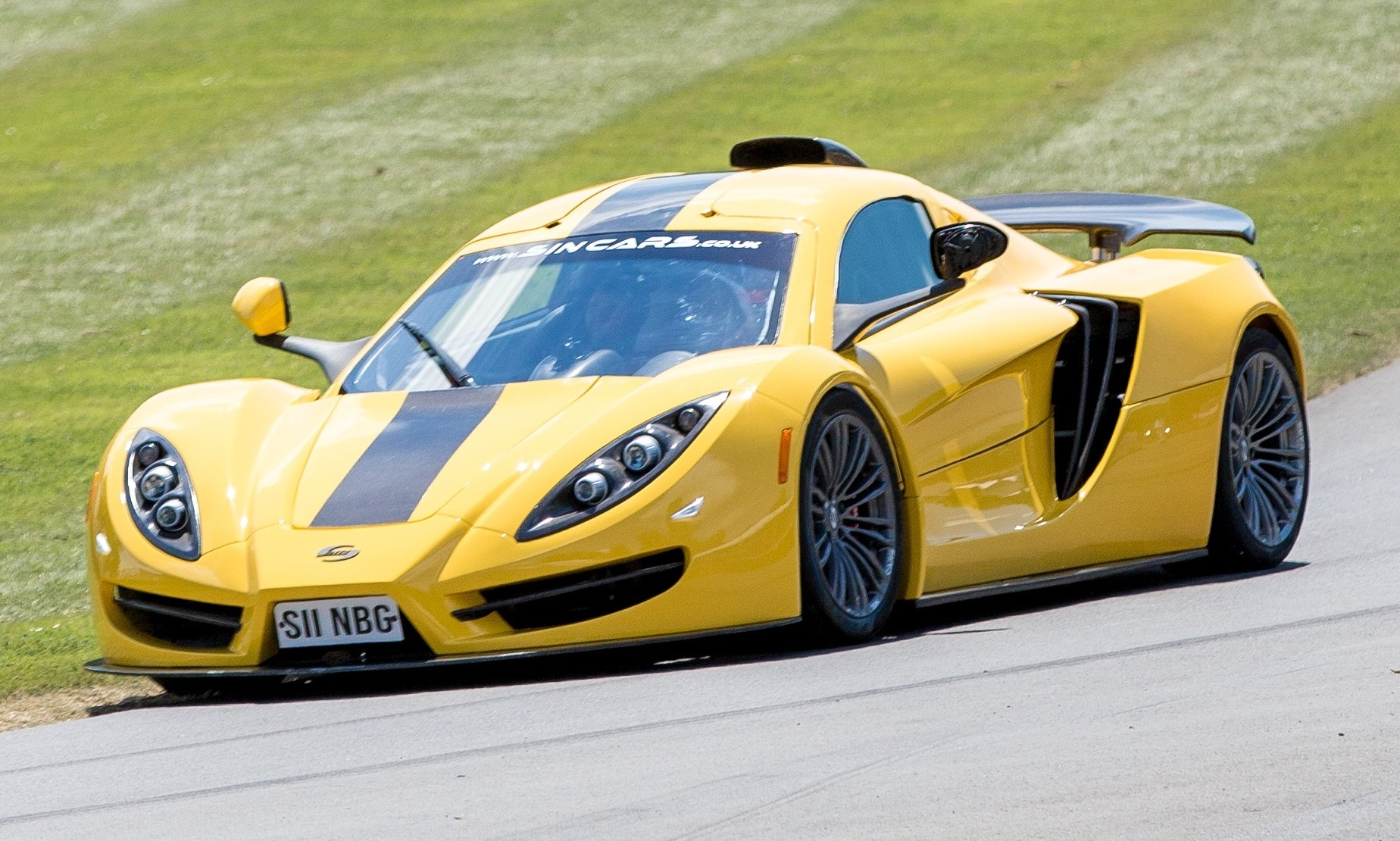
SIN R1

SIN Cars is a sports car manufacturer, founded SIN Cars Limited by the Bulgarian engineer and racing driver Rosen Daskalov in Great Britain in 2012. In 2015, the company started production of the Sin R1. The road-legal Sin R1 features a 6.2-litre V8 engine, producing 444 bhp and can reach 62 mph in 3.5 seconds. The company moved its headquarters to Munich, Germany and Ruse, Bulgaria.

==== Racing series ====
SIN entered the GT4 European Series for the 2015 season with the specified Sin R1 GT4 model. Sofia Car Motorsport finished on 8th place in the final standings.

=== Kinetik Automotive ===
Kinetik Automotive is an electric sports car manufacturer, founded by Bulgarian engineer Teodosii Teodosiev and several other Bulgarians in 2017. In 2019, the company presented their first prototype – Kinetik 07 that features an electric engine, producing 644 bhp and can reach 62 mph in 2.7 seconds. The manufacturer is also producing eGo Karts.

=== Litex Motors ===
Litex Motors is an automobile manufacturing company based in Sofia, Bulgaria and the official partner of Great Wall Motors in Bulgaria. It assembles vehicles of the Chinese manufacturer at the jointly-developed facility located in Lovech, Bulgaria.

It began manufacturing the Voleex C10 hatchback from knock-down kits in February 2012, in the first half of 2013, the Steed 5 was added to the line-up, and in November 2013, the Hover H6.

On the Bulgarian market, the company markets the Voleex C10, Steed 5 and Hover H5 models, and from 2013, the Voleex C30, Voleex C20R and the Hover H6.

The company has over 12 representative offices throughout Bulgaria, and in November 2012 it opened its first dealership outside the country, in Macedonia.

After one year of manufacturing, the factory assembled over 1,000 units of the Voleex C10. In December 2013, the company performed its first regular export to Europe, a first batch of cars being sent to Italy. In August 2014, the company started exports to Romania, as a first step towards expanding its presence into Eastern Europe.

== Former manufacturers ==
=== Bulgaralpine ===
Bulgaralpine was a sports automobile produced in Plovdiv, Bulgaria, and the result of a collaboration between Alpine (a French automobile firm) and ETO Bulet (a Bulgarian export trade organisation). Production lasted for three years (1967–1969).

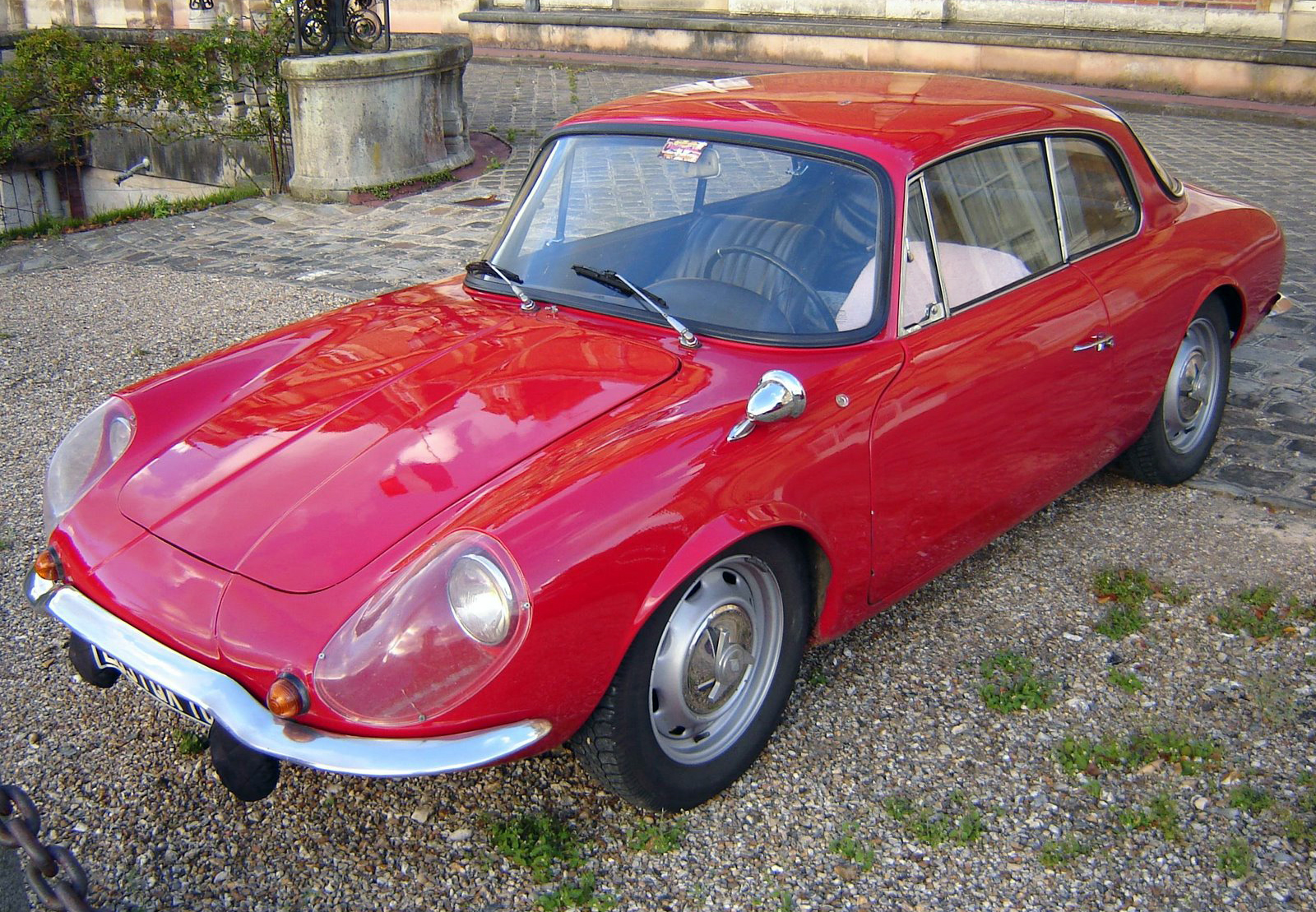
Bulgaralpine GT 4

At the end of 1966 the founder of the French car company Alpine, Jean Rédélé, arrived in Sofia, Bulgaria, having been invited by the ETO (export trade organisation) Bulet. Bulet was the same Bulgarian firm that had, through cooperation with Renault, already began the assembly of Bulgarrenault, and now had the same intention regarding Alpine. While in Bulgaria, Rédélé was introduced to the famed Bulgarian car racer Iliya Chubrikov, who was given the opportunity to test-drive the stunning Alpine A110 on the Circle Highway (at that time still in construction) around Sofia. Building on the good impressions made by his car, Rédélé made an attractive offer of cooperation to the Bulgarian side, and in early 1967 sent to Bulgaria several of his 1,000-cubic centimeters-displacement engines, two of which were installed into Bulgarrenault 8 bodies. Later that year, Iliya Chubrikov won first place in the Transbalkania rally. Shortly after that, Rédélé sent his engineering team to Bulgaria to prepare the assembly of Bulgaralpine and to train a Bulgarian team of automotive specialists. Iliya Chubrikov was hired by ETO Bulet in the capacity of a production manager for sports cars.

In order to manufacture the fiberglass bodies, Bulgaria licensed the manufacturing method for a payment of 8 million French francs which secured the necessary machinery and tooling. The raw material for the manufacture of the fiberglass was initially imported from France but later came from the GDR (East Germany) and Poland.

The first several Bulgaralpines were assembled at the end of 1967 when the stunning sports car was an absolute hit in Europe and the United States which of course gave a great deal of pride to Bulgaria. In 1968, two Bulgaralpine race cars, driven by the teams of Iliya and Nikola Chubrikov, and Atanas Taskov and Atanas Agura, took part in the Monte Carlo Rally for the very first time. For publicity purposes, ETO Bulet created an auto racing team of its own, composed by the brothers Chubrikov, the brothers Agura, Robert Kyurkchiev, Slavcho Georgiev and Atanas Taskov. The short-lived team nonetheless proved popular both in Bulgaria and abroad. All Bulgaralpine racecars were decommissioned after 1978 and never took part in another rally again.

Bulgaralpine was not intended for the mass consumer in Bulgaria, instead being aimed at sports clubs and racing teams. However, some well-to-do consumers, such as the well-known Bulgarian film director Vassil Mirchev, bought a Bulgaralpine for private use. In 1969, Mirchev attended the Cannes film festival, covering the distance between Sofia, Bulgaria, and Cannes, France, in 16 hours in his Bulgaralpine. The price of Bulgaralpine in 1969 was 8,200 Bulgarian leva.

The initial intentions were to produce one Bulgaralpine car per day, but even now it is difficult to say how many Bulgaralpines were built when production ended in 1969. Some sources state that only 60 cars were completed, others mention 120 (70 for sale in Bulgaria, and 50 for export). The production manager and race car driver Iliya Chubrikov recalls about 100 completed cars, none of which were exported beyond Bulgaria's borders.

=== Bulgarrenault ===
Bulgarrenault (or Bulgar Renault) was an automobile produced in the city of Plovdiv, Bulgaria, and the result of a collaboration between Metalhim (a Bulgarian defence firm) and Bulet (a Bulgarian export trade organisation). Production lasted for five years (1966–1970), during which the factory in Plovdiv produced two Renault models: the Renault 8 and the Renault 10.

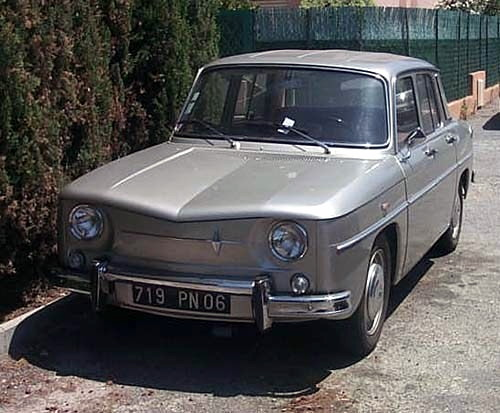
Bulgarrenault 8

In the middle of the 1960s, following the initiative of ETO (export trade organisation) Bulet, a joint-venture was formed between Bulet and SPC (state production cooperative) Metalhim, with the purpose of building passenger cars. At the time, ETO Bulet was involved in the trade of all kinds of manufactured goods, while SPC Metalhim was a manufacturing cooperative uniting all national defense factories in Bulgaria. The basic idea was to purchase complete knock down (CKD) kits of passenger cars from abroad with Bulet's available hard-currency reserves, and then to assemble them in the factories owned by Metalhim. Several offers had already been made by foreign car manufacturers (such as Renault, Fiat, Simca, and Alfa Romeo), but Renault's offer was deemed to be the most attractive one. (The French automobile manufacturer's first offer was made on May 27, 1963, concerning the assembly of the Renault 4 and Renault 4L passenger cars.)

On July 30, 1966, the Council of Ministers issued a formal authorisation to SPC Metalhim to begin negotiations with Renault through the mediation of ETO Bulet. (Initially, the assembly of the cars was intended for a factory in the town of Cherven Bryag.)

The official state newspaper Rabotnichesko Delo in its issue #261 of September 18, 1966, announced that ETO Bulet and Renault had signed a contract, and only two days later 10 passengers cars Renault 8 were shown at the Plovdiv Fair, rumored to have been assembled in the Military Factory in the town of Kazanlak. The cars were branded Bulgarrenault, and the upper left side of their windscreen bore a tricolor sticker with an inscription Bulet.

Rabotnichesko Delo's issue of September 21, 1966, contained a quote from a senior manager at Renault regarding the just-signed contract with ETO Bulet, which planned that over 10,000 passengers cars model Renault 8 would be assembled in Bulgaria in 1970.

=== Chavdar ===
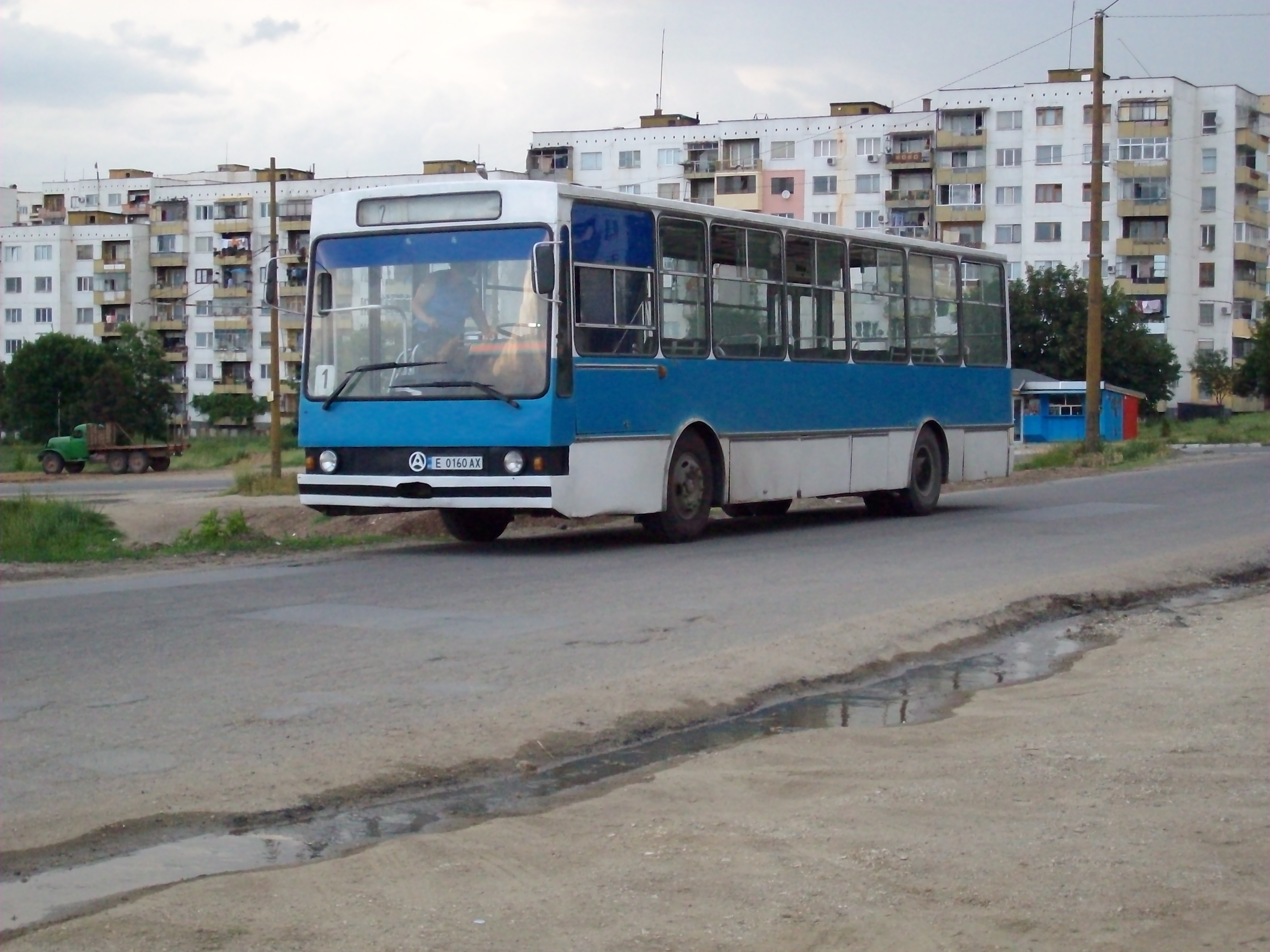
Chavdar B 13-20

Chavdar (Bulgarian: Чавдар) is a trademark and name of a Bulgarian bus building company in Botevgrad. Founded by Racho Dzhambov, the company that would later become "Chavdar" produced around 200 buses between 1927 and 1947 on chassis from Ford Motor Company, Mercedes-Benz and Dodge. In 1948 the state took control of the property. Later Chavdar models were rebadged and restyled Setras. The company closed in 1999.

In 1924 Racho Valkov Djambazov (1894–1983) opened an iron workshop in Botevgrad, Bulgaria. In 1927 Racho met with Ivan Valkov who had a transport business using rebuilt ambulances. He gave Racho one platform from Fiat and built his first vehicle. On 1 May 1948 Chavdar presented a bus based on Škoda RTO. In 1956 the production of the company increased 150%. An initiative by Vasil Djambov was to produce a ten-meter microbus based on Opel.

In 1962 the company started to produce models M65 and M66, which were very popular for intercity traffic. In the same they began producing year small buses based on the Soviet GAZ-51(1962–1969). In 1966 a new engine arrived from the institute.

At the end of the 1960s models M80 and M81 appeared, based on Škoda. In 1968 between 400 and 500 units were produced. That year the factory started modernisation. New machines, new work strategy, new workplaces were described as the future success of the company. The company started a new contract with the Setra. In 1974 it started production of models 11G5 and 11M3. They were the company's biggest success.

The minibus 5C was constructed from Kiril Hadjiev and Lubomir Toshev at the end of the 1970s. The bus created a product category called "midibus". In featured a 4 traction system and 14 seats. The first prototypes were tested in 1979. The buses were used from the small towns and villages in Bulgaria as a public bus, school bus and worker bus. The bus were used a Perkins engine.

Chavdar exported products to USSR, Greece, North Korea, Afghanistan and Nicaragua.

=== Moskvitch (Bulgaria) ===
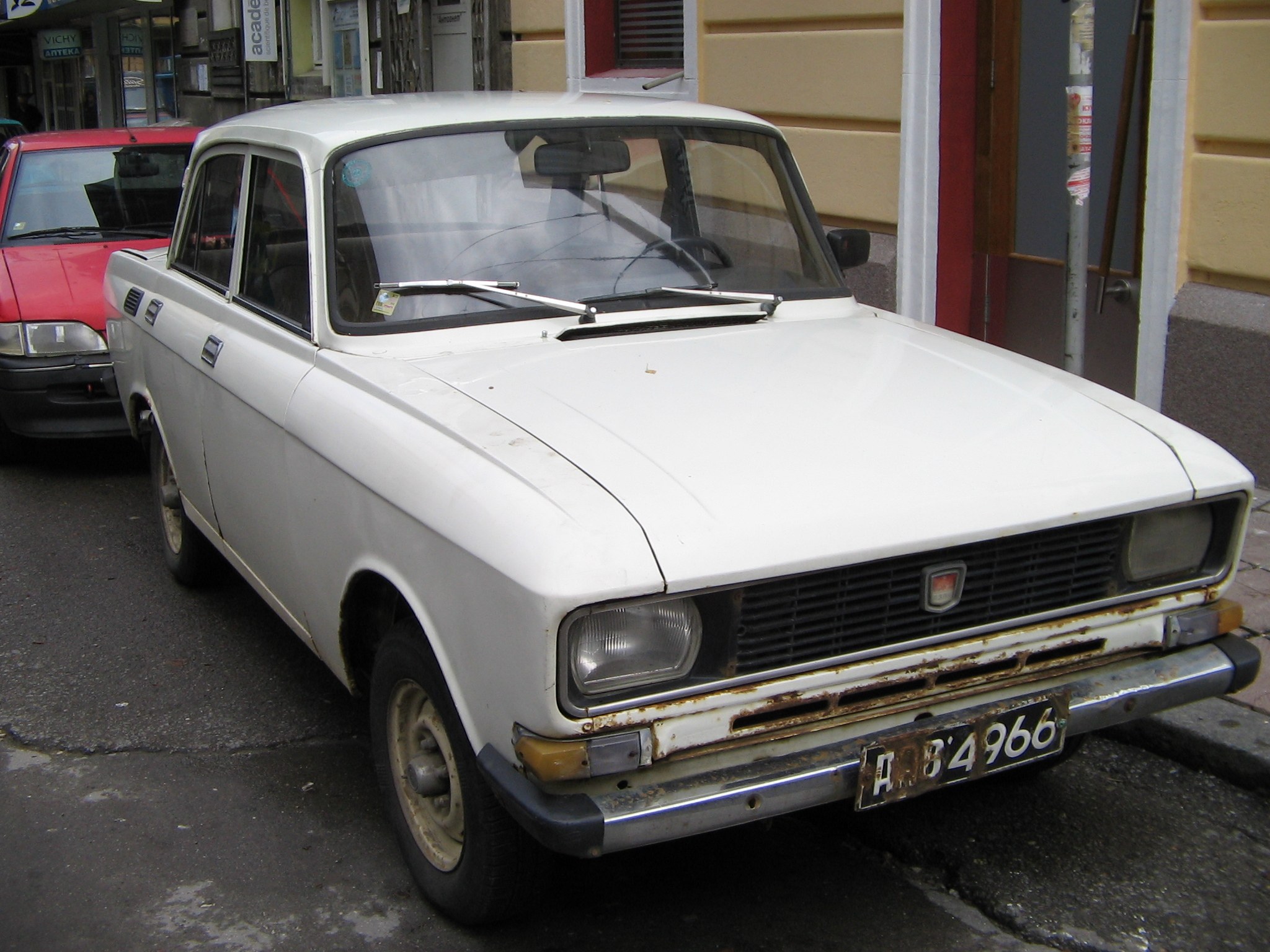
Moskvitch-2138/40 in Sofia.

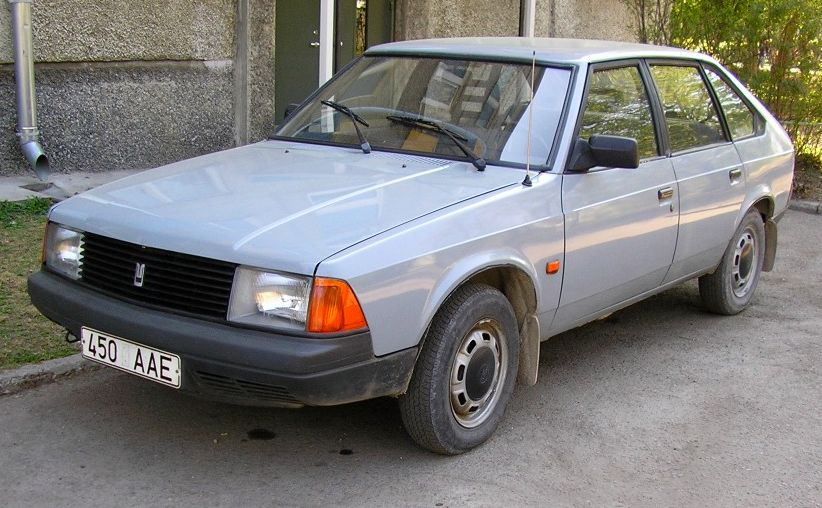
Moskvitch-21412 with 1.5 L engine.

The Moskvitch was a 20th-century Soviet/Bulgarian passenger car. Between 1966 and 1990, the Balkan factory in Lovech, Bulgaria, assembled the Soviet-designed Moskvitch 408 (later replaced by the 412 / 1500 and Aleko) from complete knock down (CKD) kits.

During the fall of 1965 Bulgaria and the USSR signed an economic cooperation agreement for the period of 1966–1970, which contained a provision that by the end of 1968 the Balkan factory in Lovech would be completely tooled for the assembly of 15,000 Moskvitch 408 passenger cars annually.

In January 1966, a group of 20 Bulgarian engineers is sent to the MZMA (Moscow Factory for Compact Cars), later renamed to AZLK or Car Factory of the Lenin Communist Youth. By the end of July 1966 a total of 90 people (in three groups of 30 people each) were sent to the MZMA for training. Soon after that, the head engineer responsible for the construction of the new factory in Bulgaria, Aleksey Tatarinov, visited the city of Lovech, and the work on the project began.

The first shipment of the complete knockdown kits, containing 900 parts each, arrived at the factory's rail ramp on October 17, 1966. The production began on October 25, 1966, and the first Moskvitch 408 production car left the production line at 3 p.m. on November 4, 1966. Until the end of 1966 a group of 7 workers was supposed to assemble a total of 32 cars, which would then be released to market.

In early 1967 the Council of Ministers issued an official decision to rename Factory 14 to Factory for Passengers Cars Balkan. It was also decided to choose a new trademark for the car with a typically Bulgarian sound. The choice of a new trademark was put up for national debate in the pages of the Pogled newspaper, although the Bulgarian Language Institute at the Bulgarian Academy of Sciences, the Slavic Languages Department at the Sofia University, and the Union of Bulgarian Journalists participated in the discussion as well. The trademark finally chosen was Rila, although the name was used only unofficially and never appeared either in the cars' documentation or on the cars themselves.

Initially, the assembly capacity of the factory was modest – only 564 Moskvitch cars were assembled during 1967. However, in 1968 2,500 cars were built, and the annual assembly capacity continued to increase progressively, reaching 8,000 cars in 1972. By that time, the assembly capacity was limited not by the factory itself, but by the capability of the Soviet supplier to produce enough complete knockdown kits to export to Bulgaria. The matter of manufacture of some parts and components for the car in the Lovech factory was discussed at that time, but nothing came out of it.

After 1974, the quantity of kits imported from the USSR was fixed at 15,000 annually, which limitation remained in effect until the end of the 1980s (although during the record-setting 1984, 16,000 cars were assembled in Lovech).

In 1976, the factory began to assemble the new freshened model Moskvitch 2138/2140 with engine displacement of 1360 or 1500 cubic centimeters, which engines were then also used in the models Moskvitch 408 and 412. The engines with displacement of 1360 cubic centimeters were dropped in 1979.

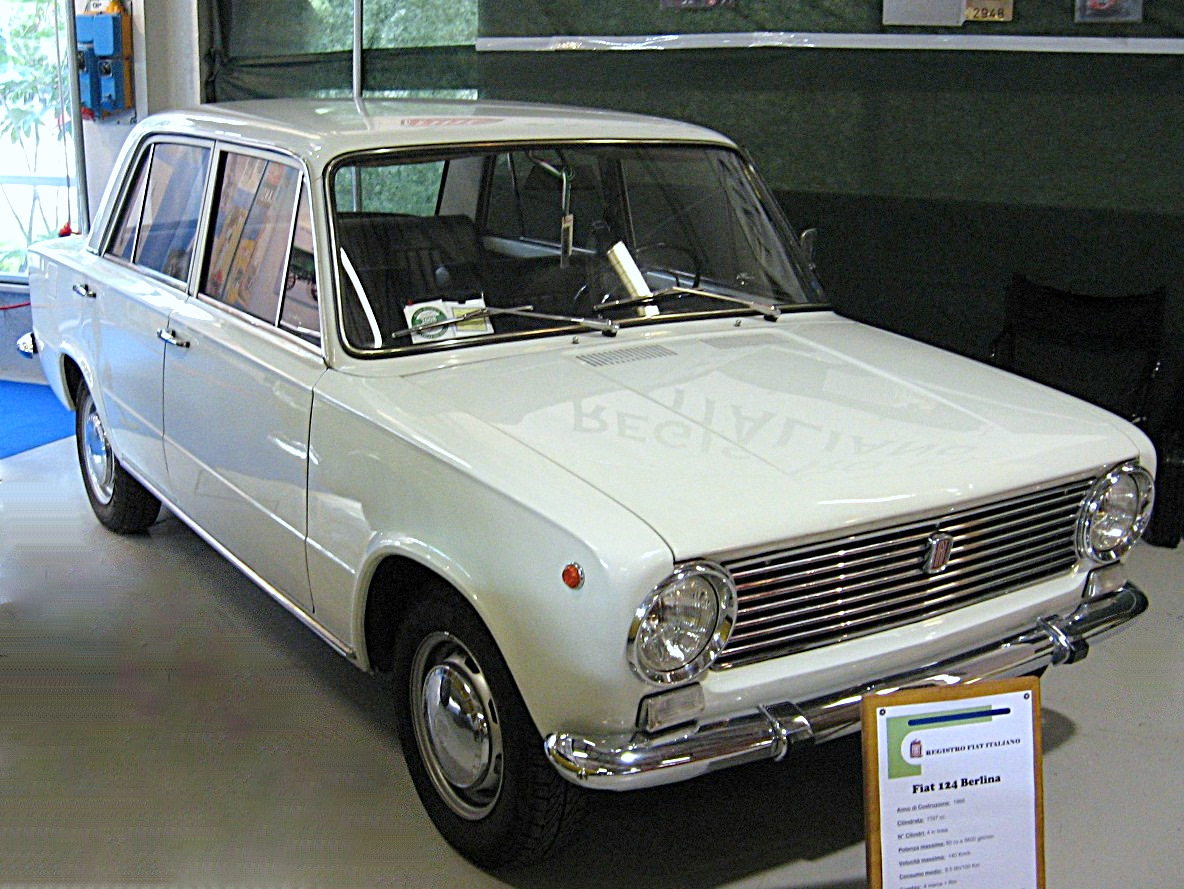
Fiat 124 sedan

In February 1987, the management of the Balkan factory, led by the then-managing director Baldzhiev, visited the AZLK to discuss the assembly of the new model Moskvitch 2141. During the series of meetings held with their Soviet counterparts, the Bulgarians expressed their desire to switch to a progressive assembly of 40% of the components of the car, with annual shipments of 50,000 complete knock-down kits by the Soviets; however, the managing director of the AZLK Kolomnikov indicated that his factory could not provide such a number of kits. The Bulgarian experts therefore concluded that a prospective assembly of the Moskvitch 2141 on the basis of the 15,000 (maximum 20,000) complete knockdown kits offered by the Soviets would be unprofitable and unfeasible.

=== Pirin-Fiat ===
Pirin-Fiat was the trademark of several passenger automobiles produced in Lovech, Bulgaria, and the result of a collaboration between Fiat (an Italian automobile firm) and SPC Balkankar (a Bulgarian state production cooperative). Production lasted for five years (1967–1971).

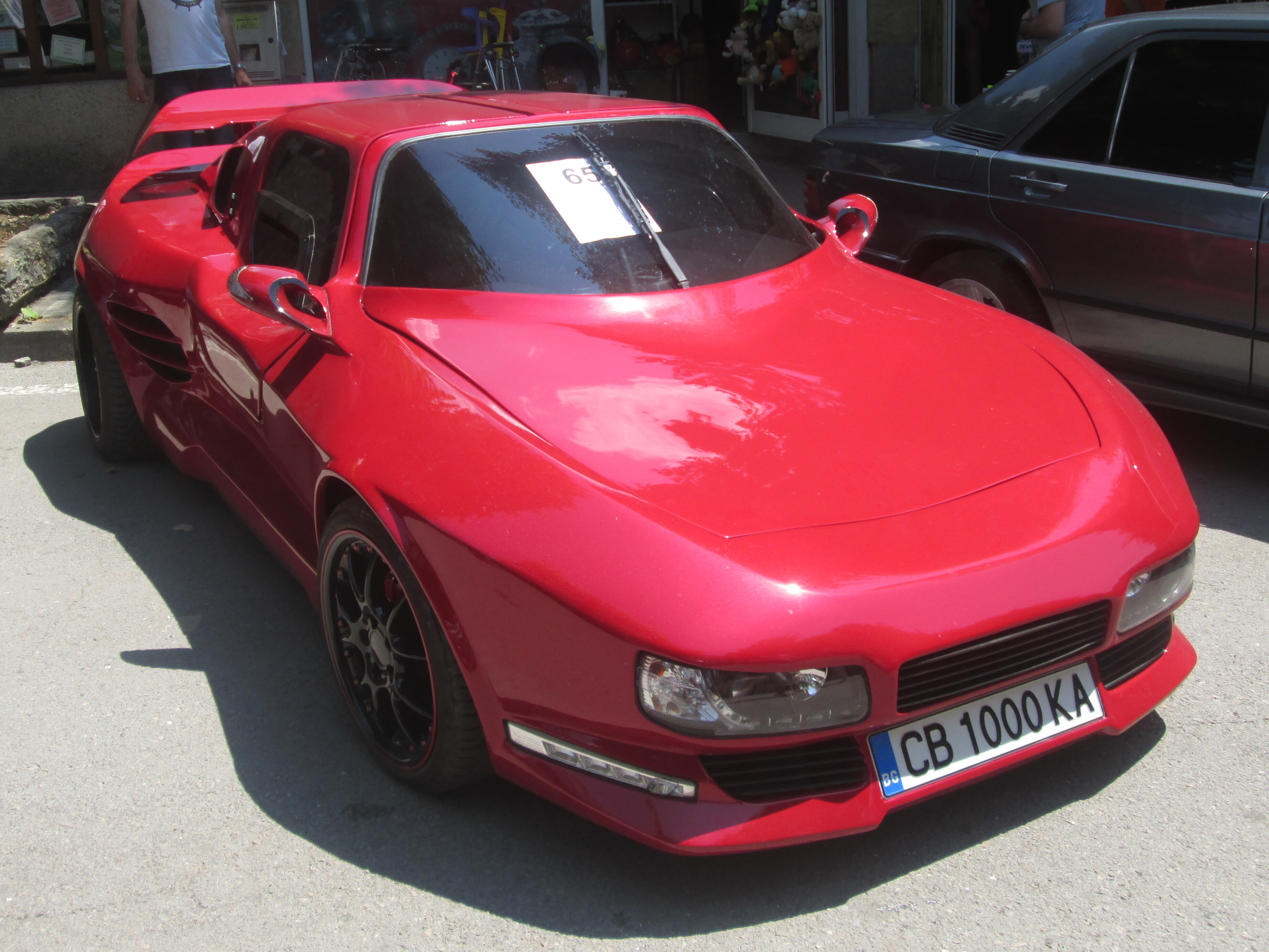
Sofia-B

On September 26, 1966, a meeting was held between the management of SPC (state production cooperative) Balkankar and representatives of the Italian automobile company Fiat. Subsequently, the Fiat representatives informed their management in Turin that SPC Balkankar wished to enter into a contract with Fiat, with performance to be given in several stages as follows:

- Until the end of 1966, Fiat was to deliver 300-350 Fiat 850 passenger cars in complete knockdown (CKD) kits to be assembled by SPC Balkankar.
- Until the end of 1967, Fiat was to deliver 3000-5000 Fiat 850 passenger cars in complete knockdown kits to be assembled by SPC Balkankar.
- Fiat was to design a factory for the assembly and partial manufacture of automobiles, which was to begin operations in Bulgaria at a later date.
- Fiat was to set up a network of service stations.
- Fiat was to design and construct a warehouse for spare parts.

The first 18 Fiat 850 cars arrived at the Factory for Passenger Cars Balkan in Lovech on May 10, 1967. After the Bulgarian side was trained in the assembly of the Fiats, it was decided to choose a Bulgarian-sounding trademark for the cars. The unofficial trademark was Pirin, but it was never featured on the cars themselves. The first Fiat 850 passenger car was assembled at the Balkan factory on June 27, 1967.

On March 12, 1968, the first Fiat 850 cars based on variant 2A were received at the factory as complete knockdown kits. This was followed by the arrival of Fiat's permanent technical adviser on April 2. The assembly of Fiat 850 based on variant 2A began on April 4, 1968.

Between April and May 1968, Bulgarian engineer Dimitar Damyanov was sent to Turin to sign a contract with Fiat regarding the delivery of welding and assembly machinery.

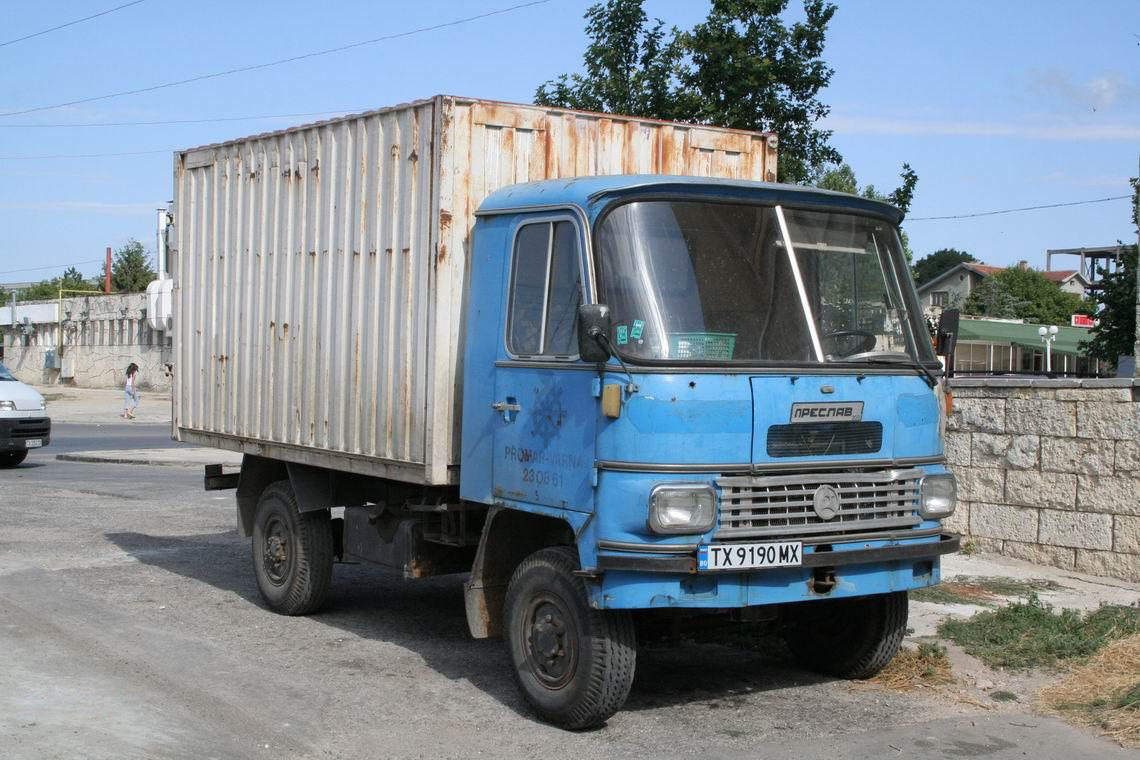
Preslav truck from the 1980s

On April 28, 1968, the Italian engineer Brasio arrived at the Balkan factory in Lovech as a technical adviser, and on December 13 of the same year the Italian specialists Mueller and Grimaldi arrive to install the painting machinery.

The five-year contract between Balkankar and Fiat lapsed in 1971 and was not renewed. The last Fiat 850 left the Lovech factory in September 1971.

=== Sofia ===
Sofia was the name of two versions of two-passenger vehicles manufactured in Bulgaria in the 1980s and 1990s, from designer Velizar Andreev.

=== Preslav ===
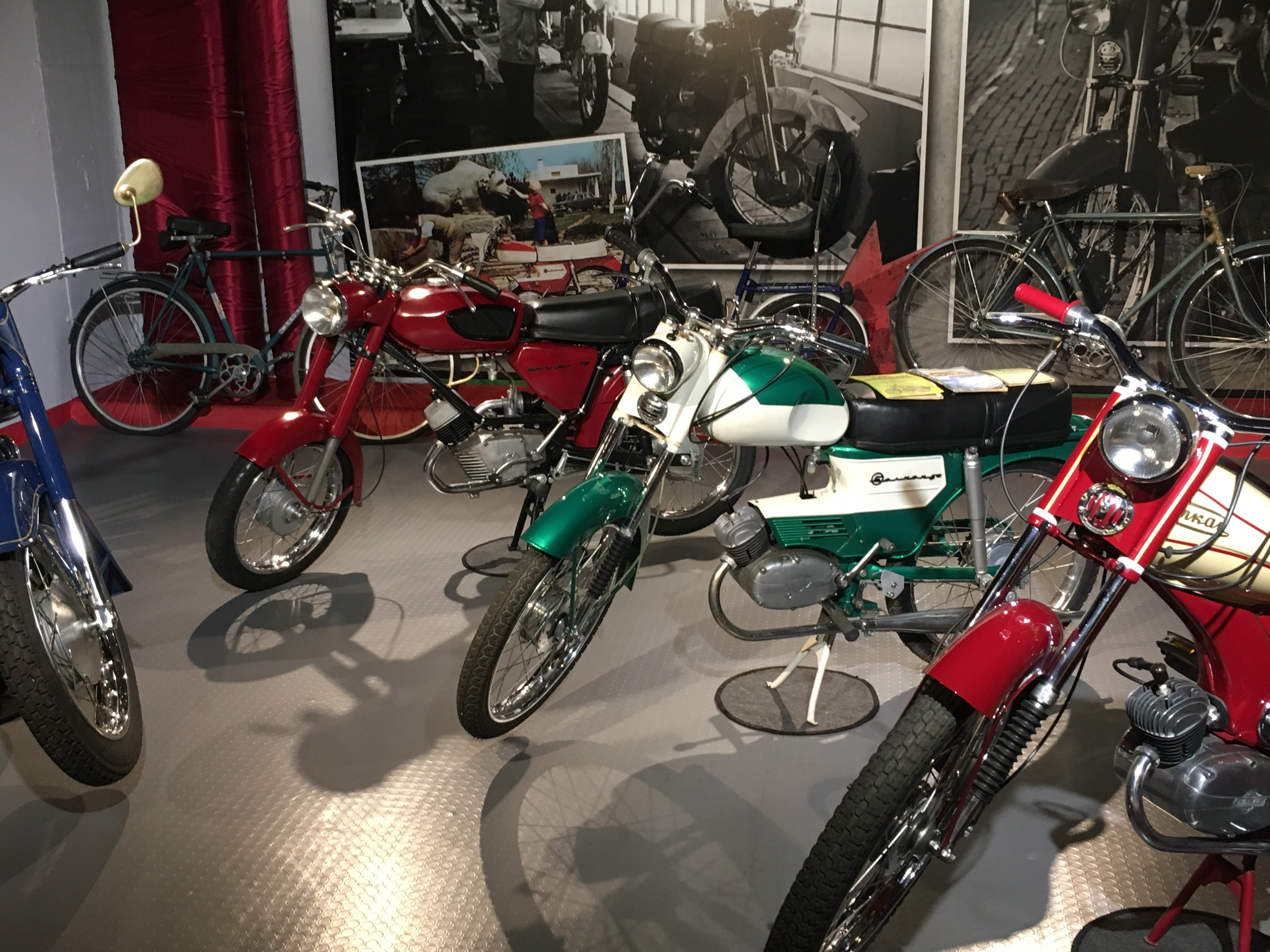
Balkan mopeds in Varna museum

Preslav was a truck manufacturer. The company were established in 1980. Preslav trucks were updated versions of trucks, which were made by Madara in Shumen. The company was closed in 2000.

=== Balkan ===
Balkan was a brand of motorcycles manufactured in Lovech, active between 1957 and 1975. The motorcycles were of three classes: 50cc, 75cc mopeds and 250cc two-stroke motorcycles similar to Jawa. A total of 271,562 pieces of all models were produced.
