= Haval H1 =

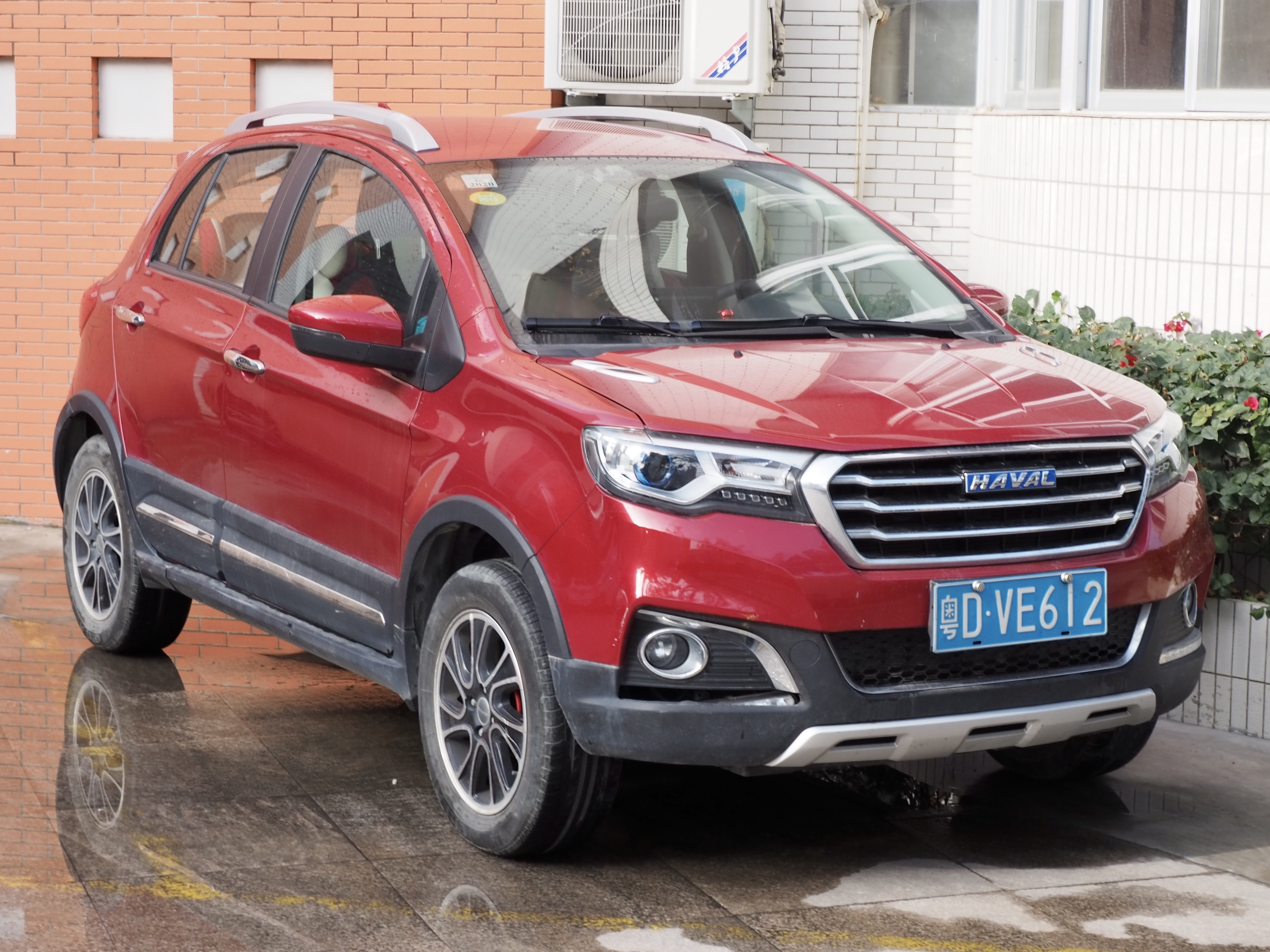
- Haval H1 II

Overview
- Manufacturer: Haval (Great Wall Motor)
- Production: 2012–2021
- Assembly: China

Body and chassis
- Class: Subcompact crossover SUV (B)
- Body style: 5-door SUV
- Layout: Front-engine, front-wheel-drive

The Haval H1 (formerly the Great Wall Haval M4) is a subcompact crossover SUV produced by the Chinese manufacturer Great Wall. It was essentially a rebadged and lifted Great Wall Florid, until the second generation which is a rebadged Great Wall Voleex C20R. The Great Wall Haval M4 was renamed to Haval H1 after Great Wall launched Haval into an individual sub-brand in 2013.

== First generation ==
Haval H1 I
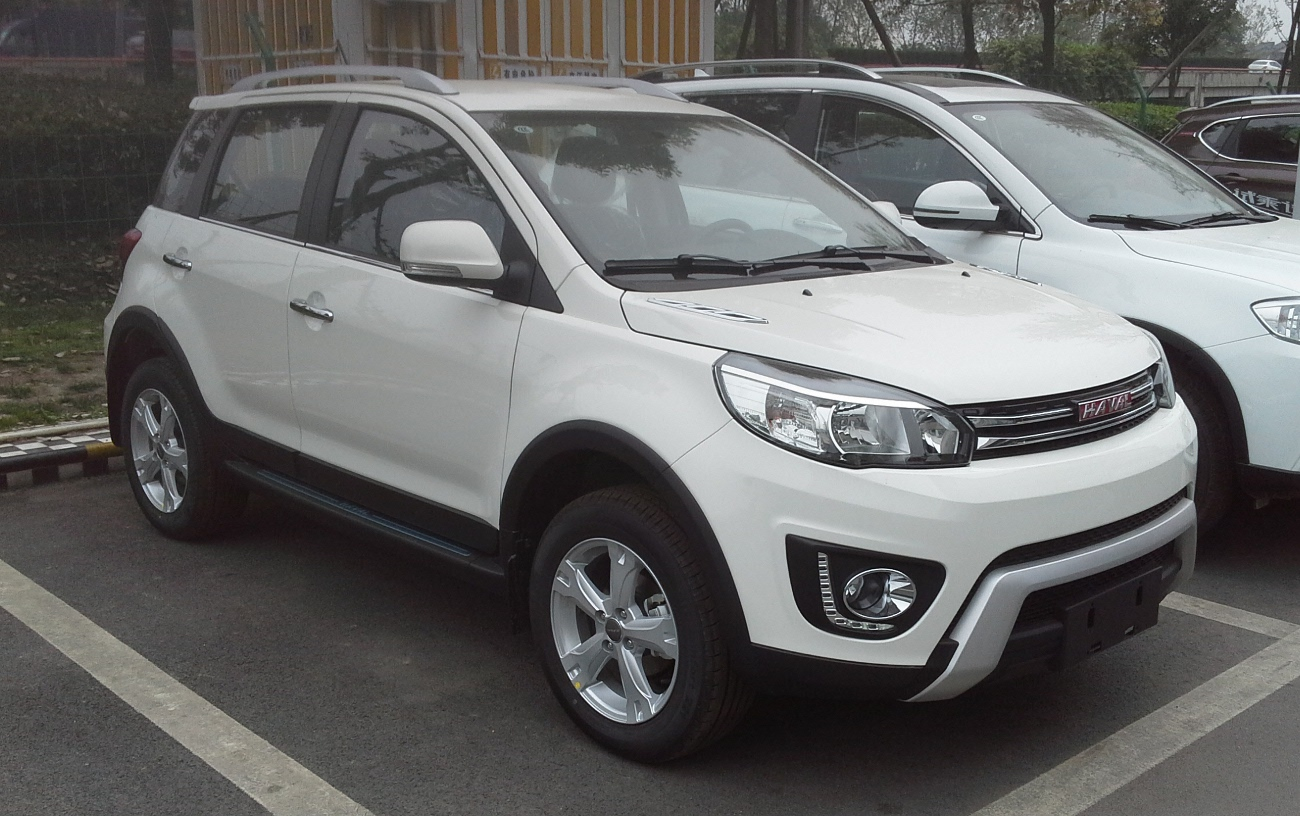

Overview
- Also called: Great Wall M4; Haval M4; Haval H1
- Production: 2012–2014

Body and chassis
- Related: Great Wall Florid

Powertrain
- Engine: Petrol: 1.5 L GW4G15 I4
- Transmission: 6-speed manual; 6-speed automatic

Dimensions
- Wheelbase: 2,460 mm (96.9 in)
- Length: 3,898 mm (153.5 in)
- Width: 1,729 mm (68.1 in)
- Height: 1,621 mm (63.8 in)

Based on the Great Wall Florid & Toyota Ist, the Great Wall Haval M4 has been launched on the Chinese car market in 2012. Price ranges from 63,900 to 71,900 yuan.

=== Malaysia ===
The Great Wall Haval M4 was launched in Malaysia in July 2014 as the Great Wall M4 with three variants available: Standard, Comfort and Premium. All three variants could be had with either a manual or automatic gearbox. Early models were fully imported from China. Local assembly in Malaysia started in December 2014. The locally assembled models were officially available as of January 2015. In November 2015, the "Elite" add-on kit became available for the Premium variant. Differences included a new design for the halogen projector headlights with LED positioning lamps, a front grille with a hexagonal mesh design, 16-inch alloy wheels with different multi-spoke design, matte black vinyl wrap for the roof and red-black colour combo finish for the leather seats. As of early 2016, the Standard variant was dropped and it was rebranded into the Haval M4. As of early 2017, the manual transmission option was no longer available and the vehicle was again rebranded now into the Haval H1.

=== Gallery ===
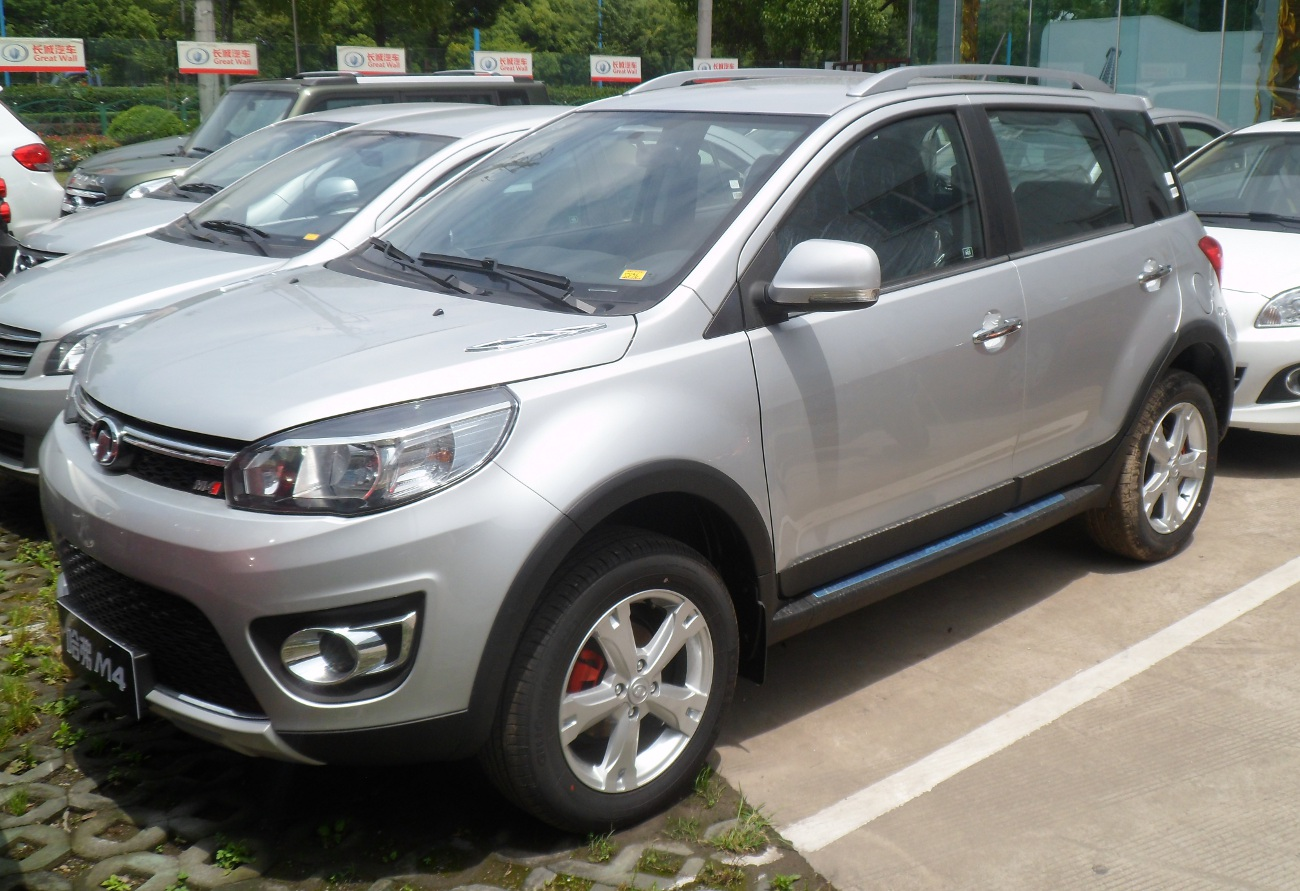
Before name change, the Great Wall Haval M4 front

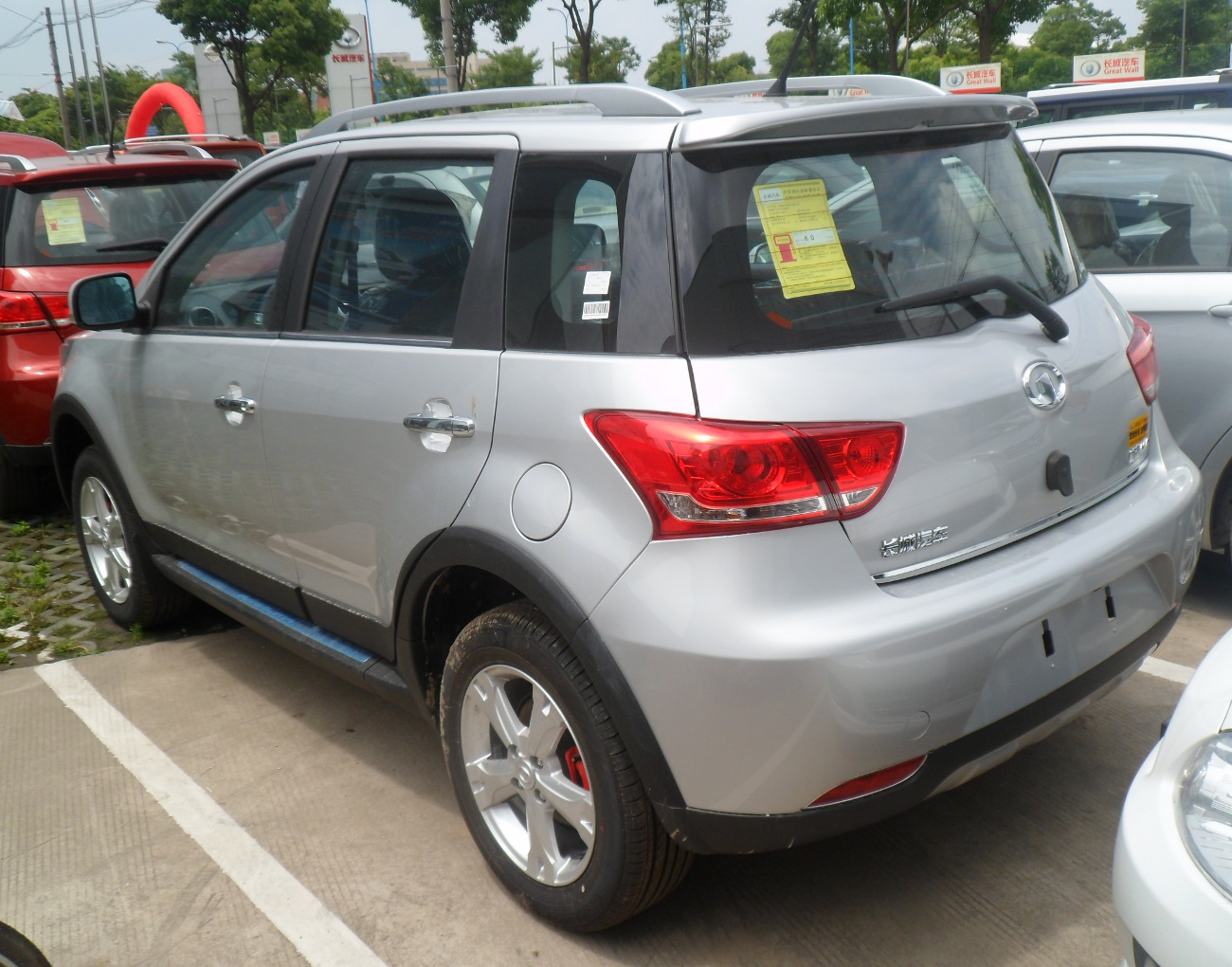
Before name change, the Great Wall Haval M4 rear

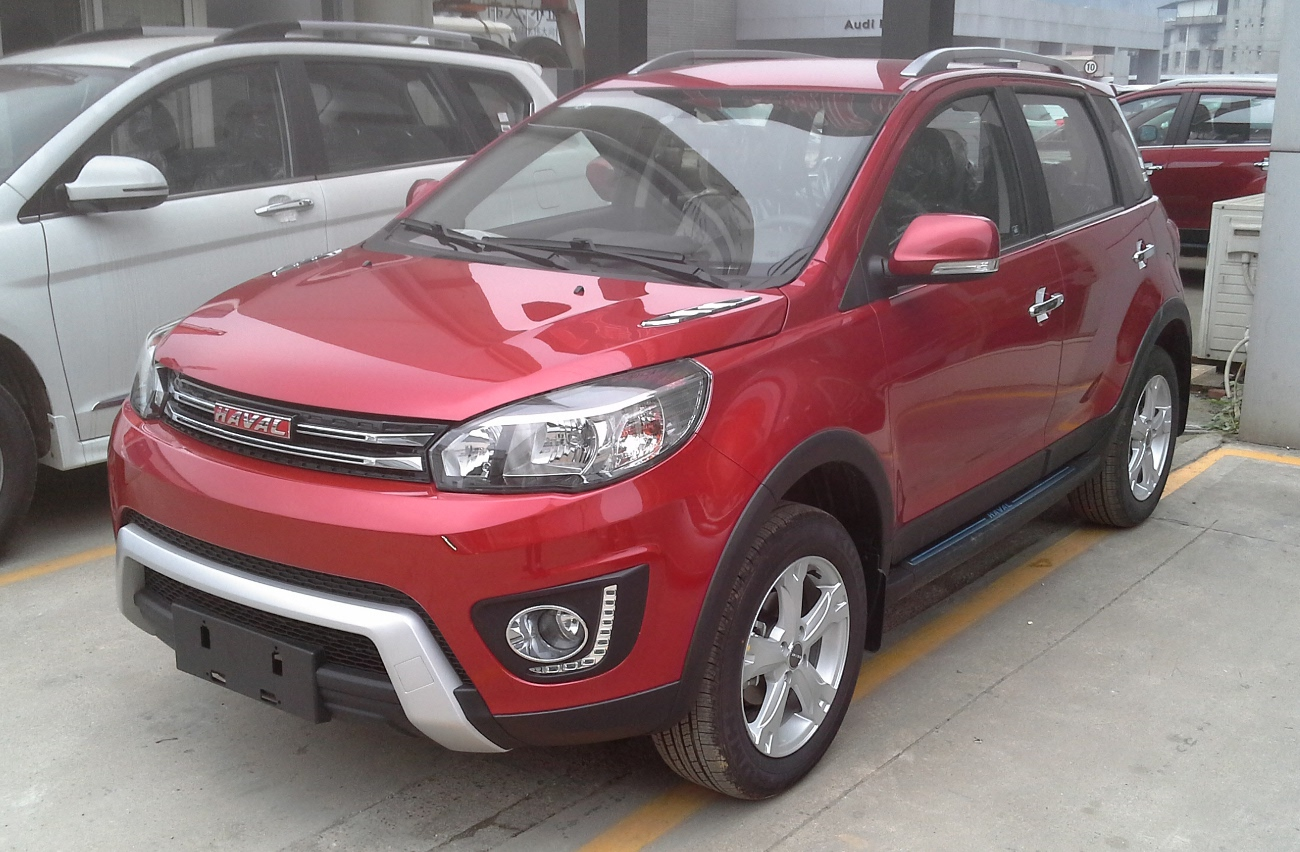
First generation Haval H1 Red Label front

=== Safety ===
The H1 for Africa received 2 stars for adult occupants and 2 stars for toddlers from Global NCAP 1.0 in 2020 (similar to Latin NCAP 2013).

Global NCAP 1.0 test results (South Africa) Haval H1 – 2 Airbags (2020, similar to Latin NCAP 2013)
Test	Score	Stars
Adult occupant protection	0.06/17.00	2 /5 stars
Child occupant protection	2.00/49.00	2 /5 stars

ASEAN NCAP test results GWM Haval M4 (2014)
Test	Points	Stars
Adult occupant:	9.64	3 /5 stars
Child occupant:	79%	4 /5 stars
Safety assist:	NA	

== Second generation ==
Haval H1 II
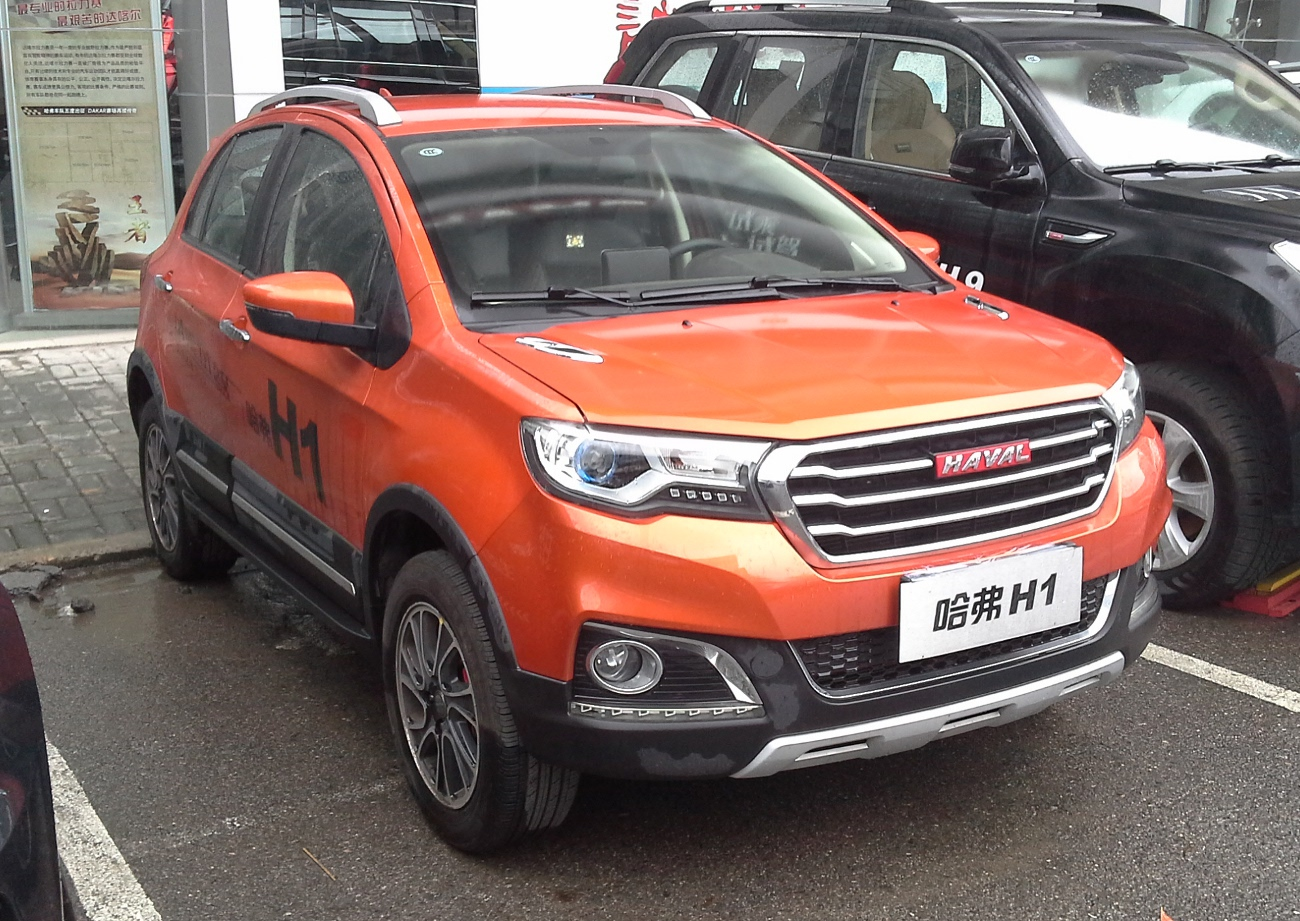

Overview
- Production: 2014–2021

Body and chassis
- Related: Great Wall Voleex C10; Great Wall Voleex C20R

Powertrain
- Engine: Petrol: 1.5 L GW4G15 I4
- Transmission: 5-speed manual; 6-speed automatic

Dimensions
- Wheelbase: 2,560 mm (100.8 in)
- Length: 3,898 mm (153.5 in)
- Width: 1,729 mm (68.1 in)
- Height: 1,621 mm (63.8 in)

The second-generation Haval H1 was introduced to the Chinese car market, with prices ranging from 68,900 yuan to 82,900 yuan. Debuting at the 2014 Chengdu Auto Show in China, this subcompact crossover is essentially a rebadged Great Wall Voleex C20R. The only engine available is a 1.5 liter four-cylinder petrol engine producing 79 kW (106 hp) and 138 N⋅m (102 lb⋅ft), mated to a five-speed manual gearbox.

=== Gallery ===
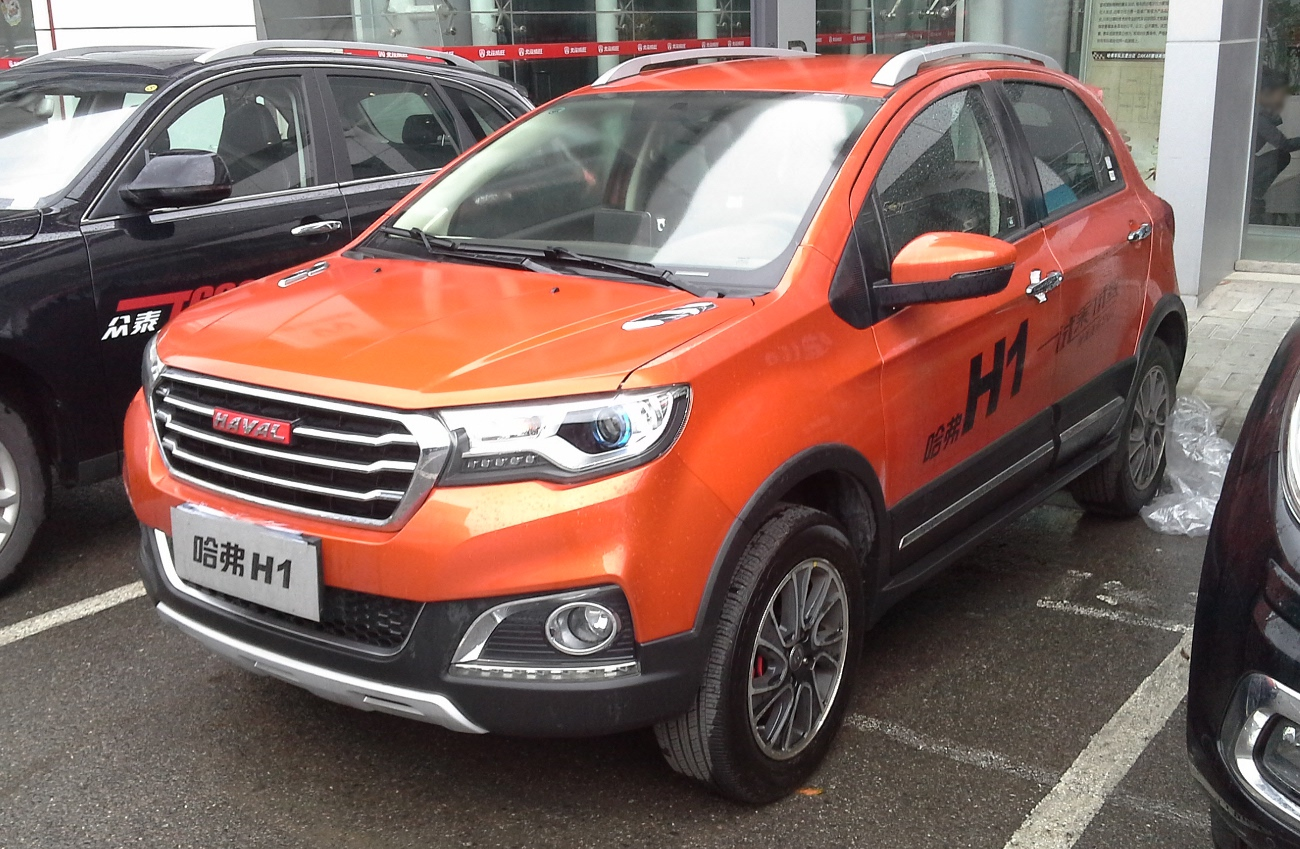
Second generation Haval H1 Red Label front

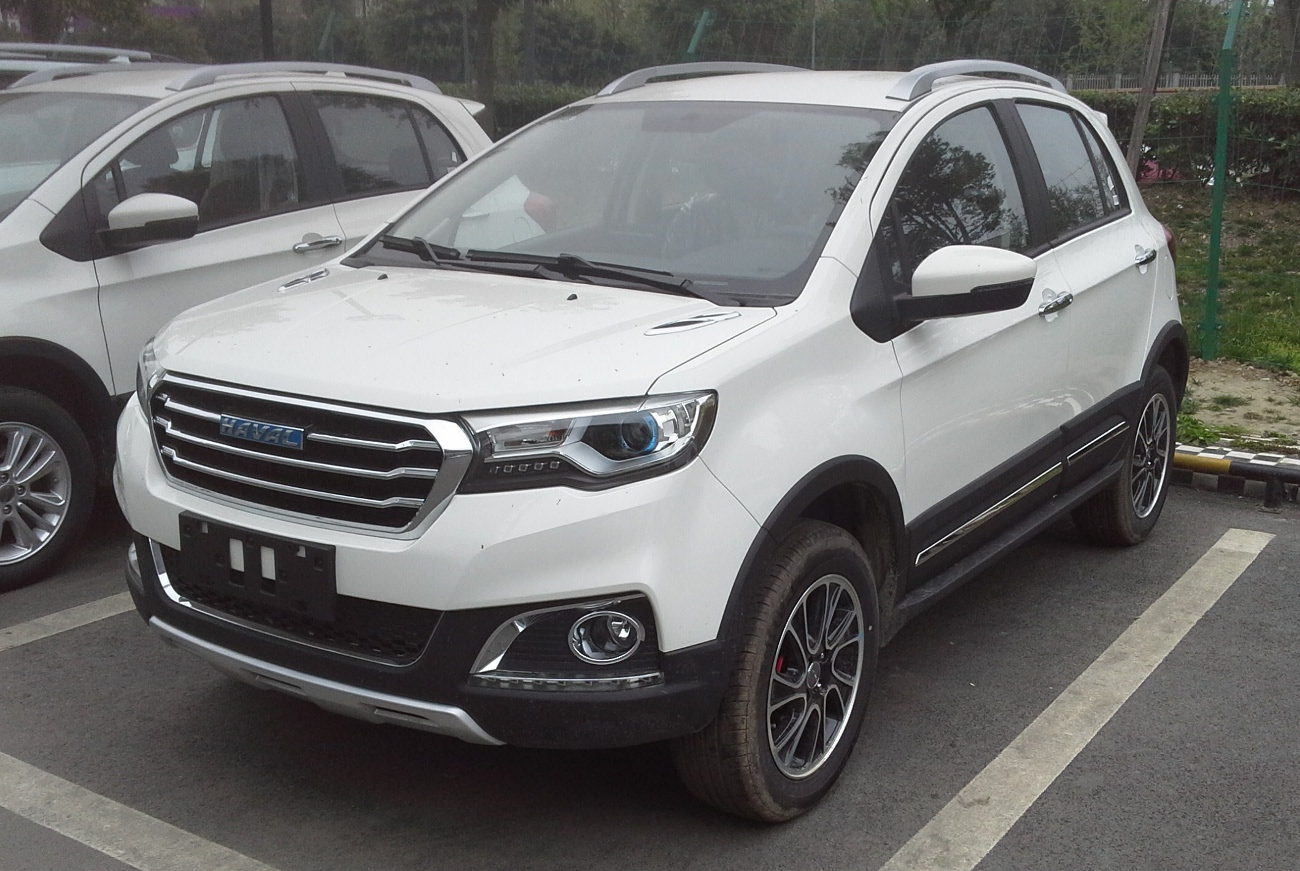
Second generation Haval H1 Blue Label front

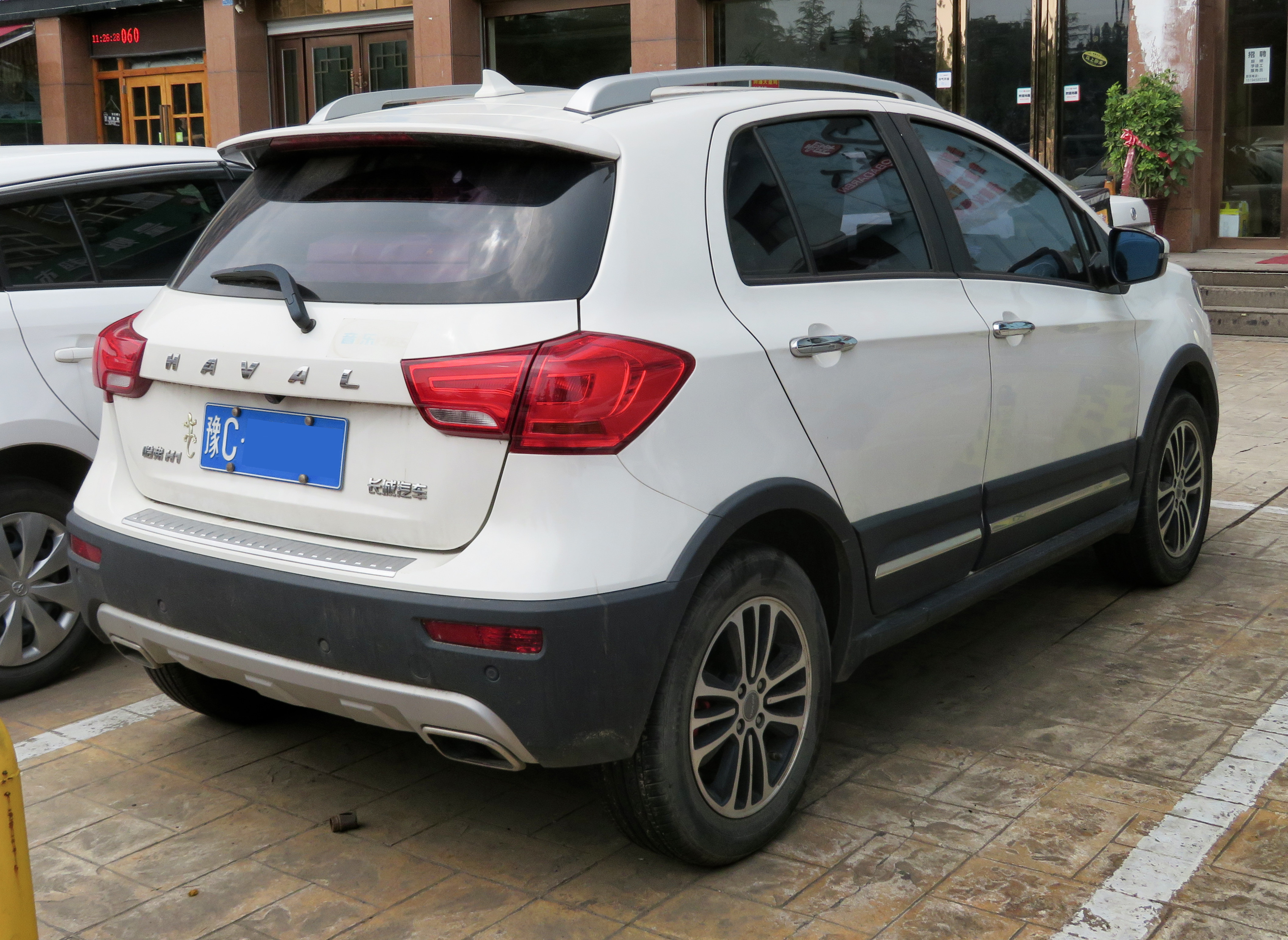
Second generation Haval H1 rear
