= Great Wall Voleex C10 =

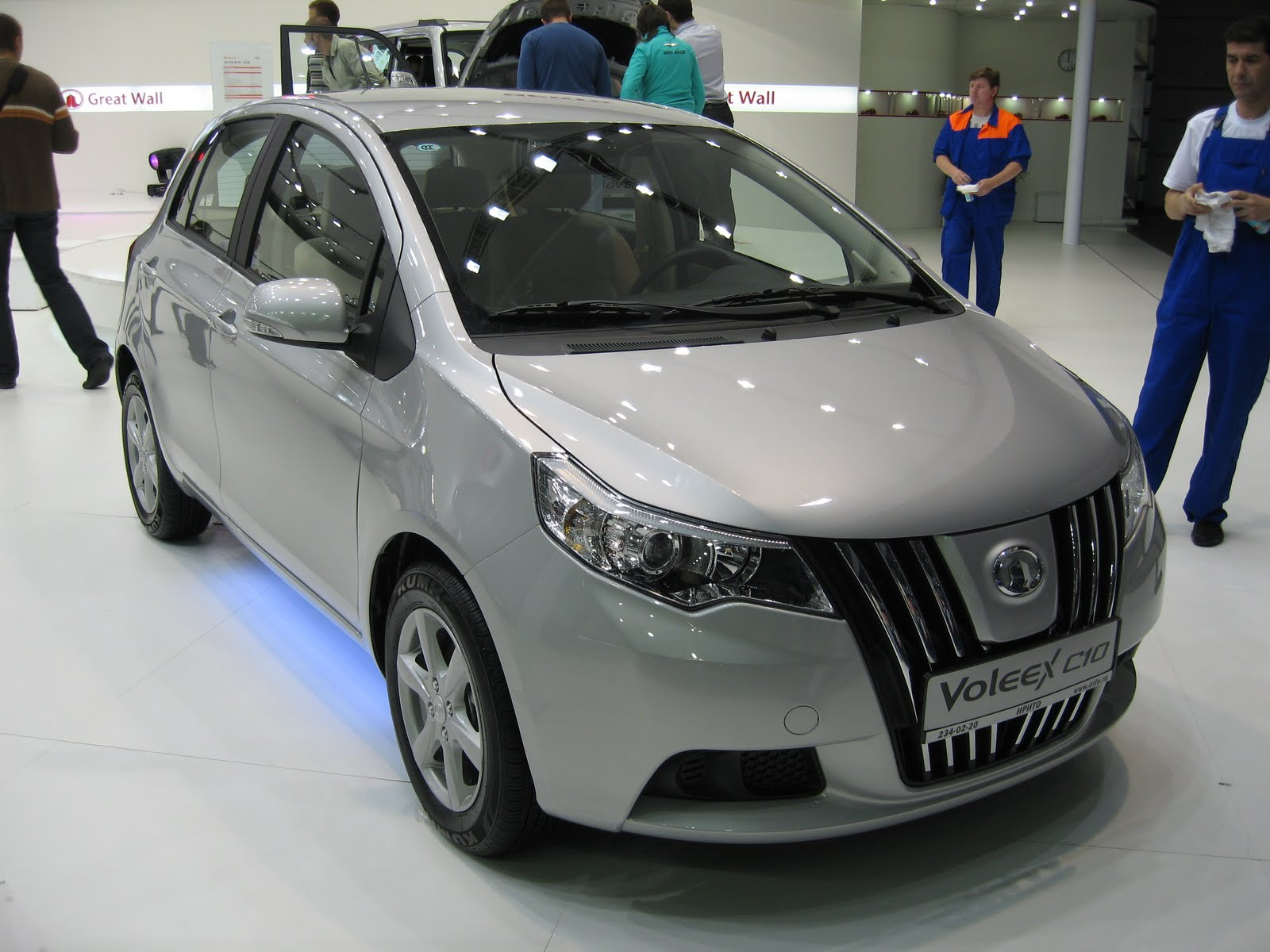

Overview
- Manufacturer: Great Wall Motors
- Also called: Great Wall Voleex C20R; Great Wall Phenom; Great Wall Motors Ling'ao; Pyeonghwa Ppeokkugi 1507 (North Korea)
- Production: 2010–2014
- Assembly: Baoding, China; Bahovitsa, Bulgaria (Litex Motors)

Body and chassis
- Class: Supermini
- Body style: 5-door hatchback
- Layout: Front-engine, front-wheel-drive
- Related: Haval H1

Powertrain
- Engine: Petrol; 1.3 L GW4G13 I4; 1.5 L GW4G15 I4
- Transmission: 5-speed manual 6 speed automatic

Dimensions
- Wheelbase: 2,460 mm (96.9 in)
- Length: 3,810 mm (150.0 in)
- Width: 1,705 mm (67.1 in)
- Height: 1,540 mm (60.6 in)
- Curb weight: 1,100 kg (2,425 lb)

The Great Wall Voleex C10 (Chinese: 长城凌傲; pinyin: Chángchéng Língào) is a supermini car manufactured by the Chinese company Great Wall Motors between 2010 and 2013. Also known as the Great Wall Phenom, the C10 features a distinctive front grille design, but shares many visual similarities with the Toyota Vitz. A more restrained grille is available in some markets.

== Overview ==
It is exported to the Middle East and Ukraine as the Voleex C10 with a scheduled Australian release date of 2012. It was announced that the C10 would also be exported to Britain by 2011 and sold in Daihatsu dealerships, but no on-sale date was formally announced.

The C10 is produced in 1.3 L (1298cc) and 1.5 L (1497cc) 4-cylinder petrol engined versions. The 1.3 L produces 68 kW (92 PS; 91 bhp) and torque of 118 N⋅m (87 lb⋅ft) and the 1.5 L produced 77 kW (105 PS; 103 bhp) and 138 N⋅m (102 lb⋅ft).

== Great Wall Voleex C20R ==
The C20R is the crossover version of the C10. That later spawned the second generation Haval H1 crossover.

== Gallery ==
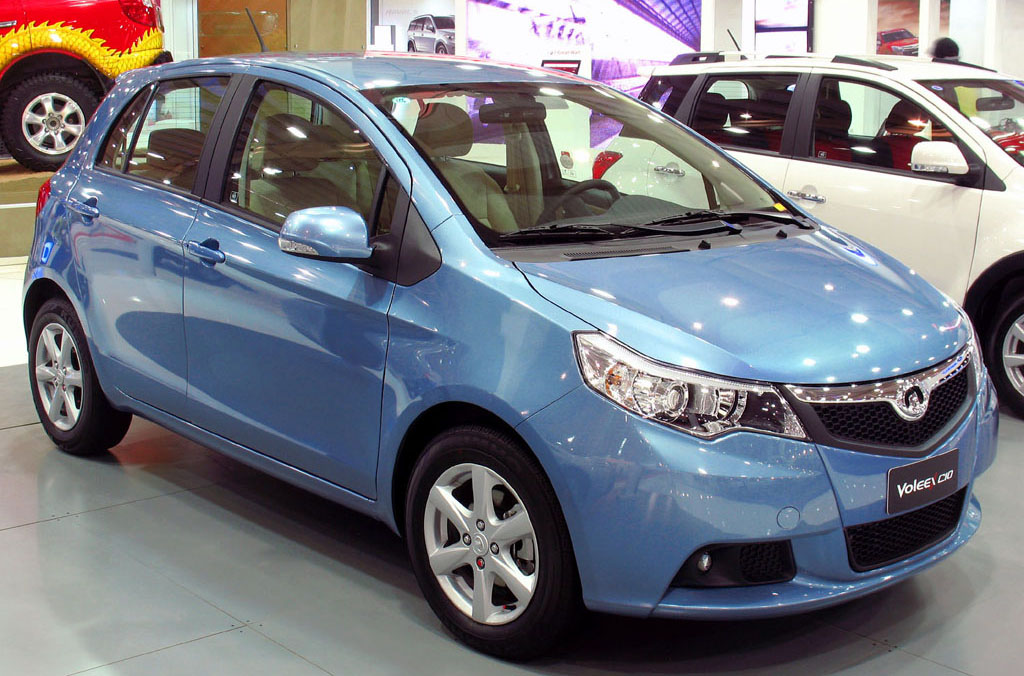
Great Wall Voleex C10 pre-facelift front, with more conservative front-end styling.

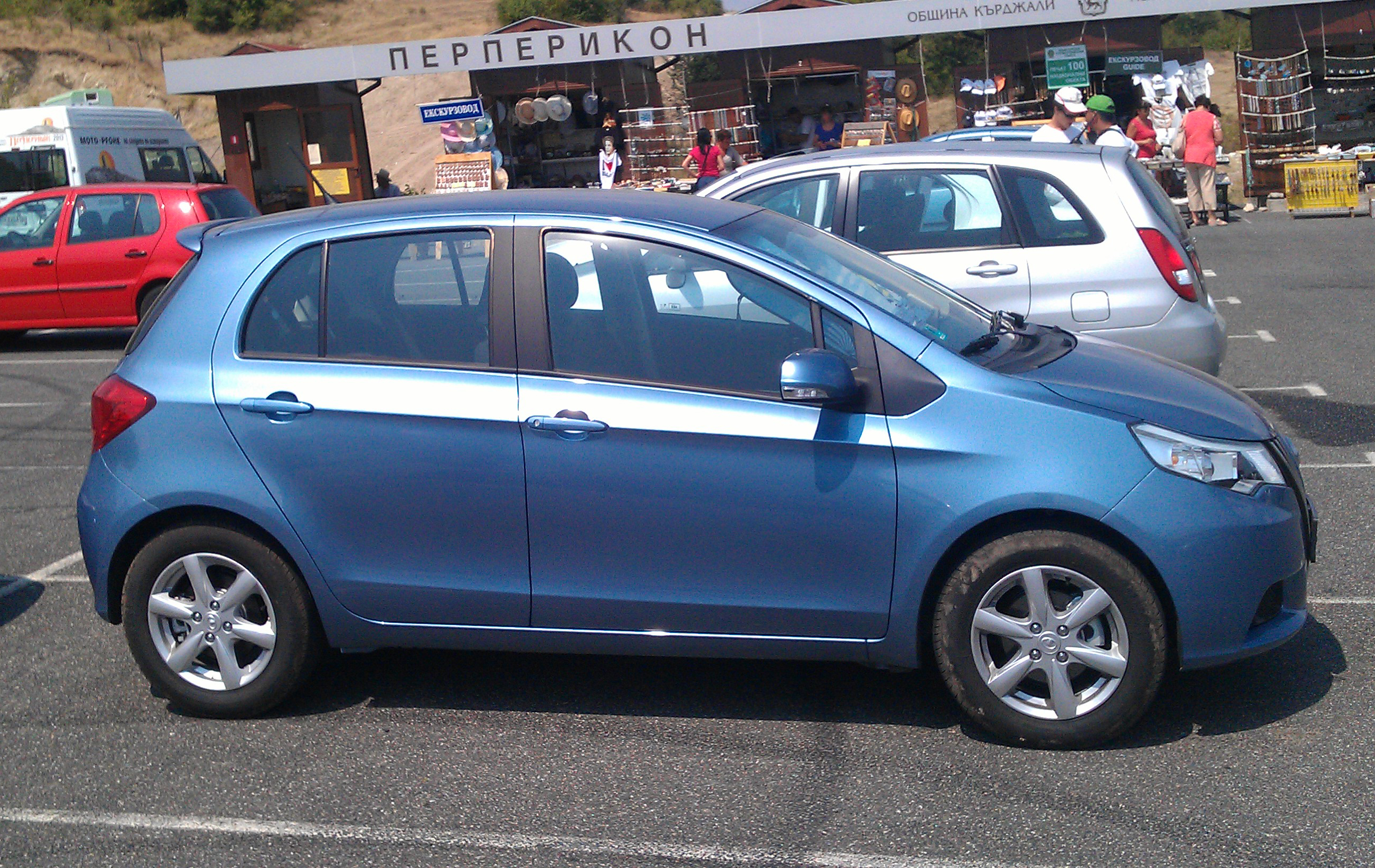
Great Wall Voleex C10 pre-facelift side, heavily inspired by the Toyota Yaris/Vitz.

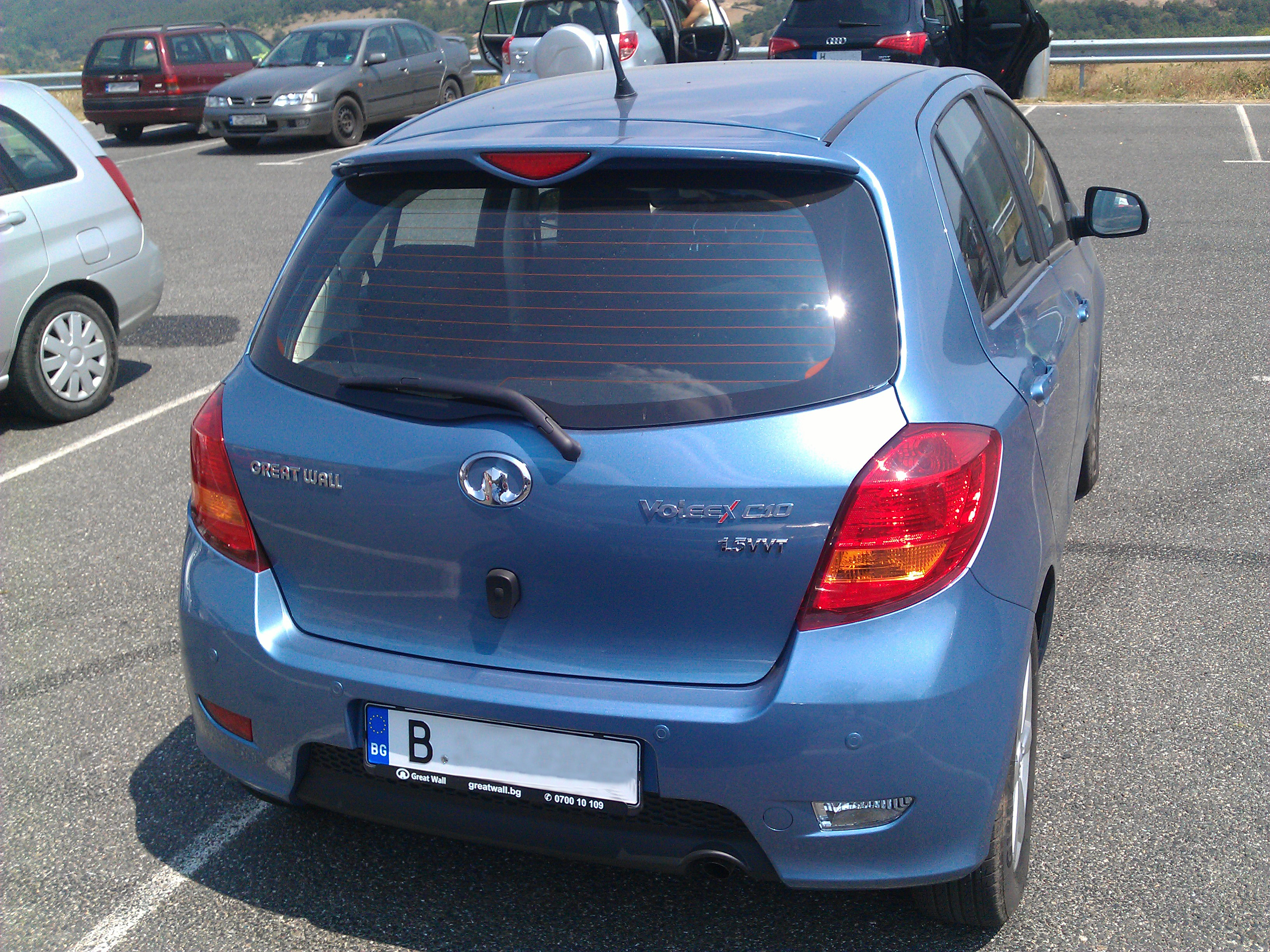
Great Wall Voleex C10 pre-facelift rear.

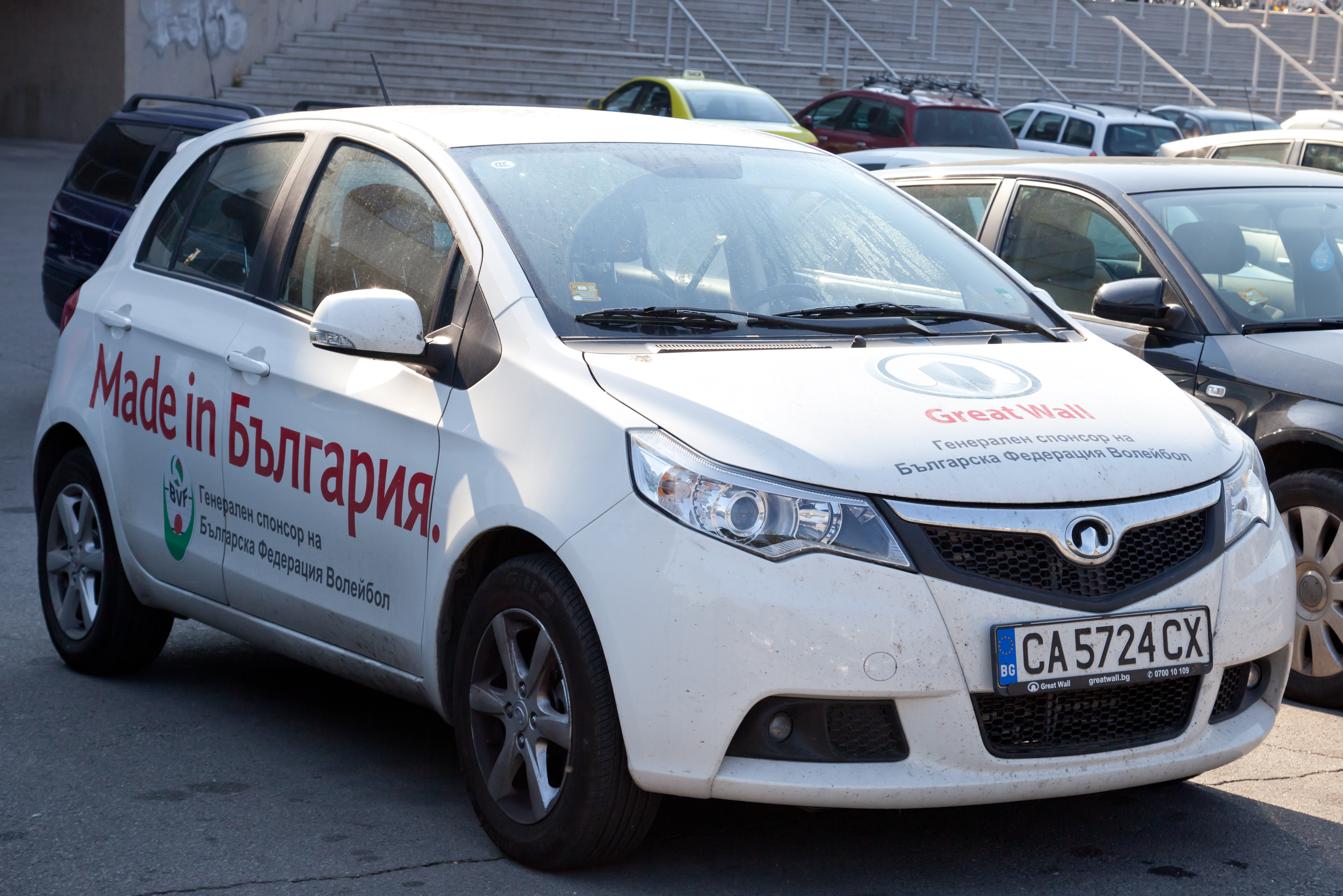
A Litex Motors-produced 2012 Great Wall Voleex C10 in Sofia.

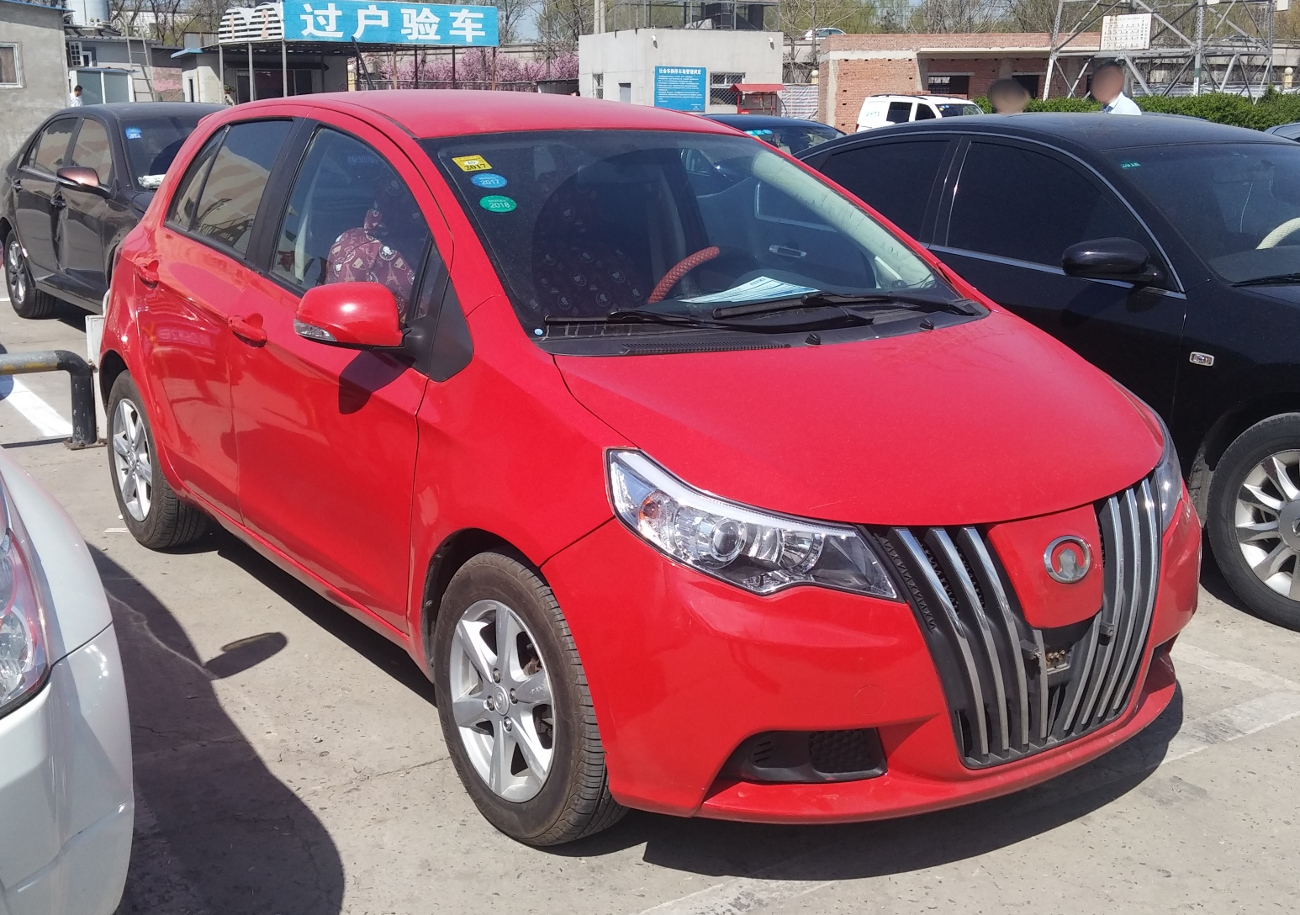
Great Wall Voleex C10 facelift.

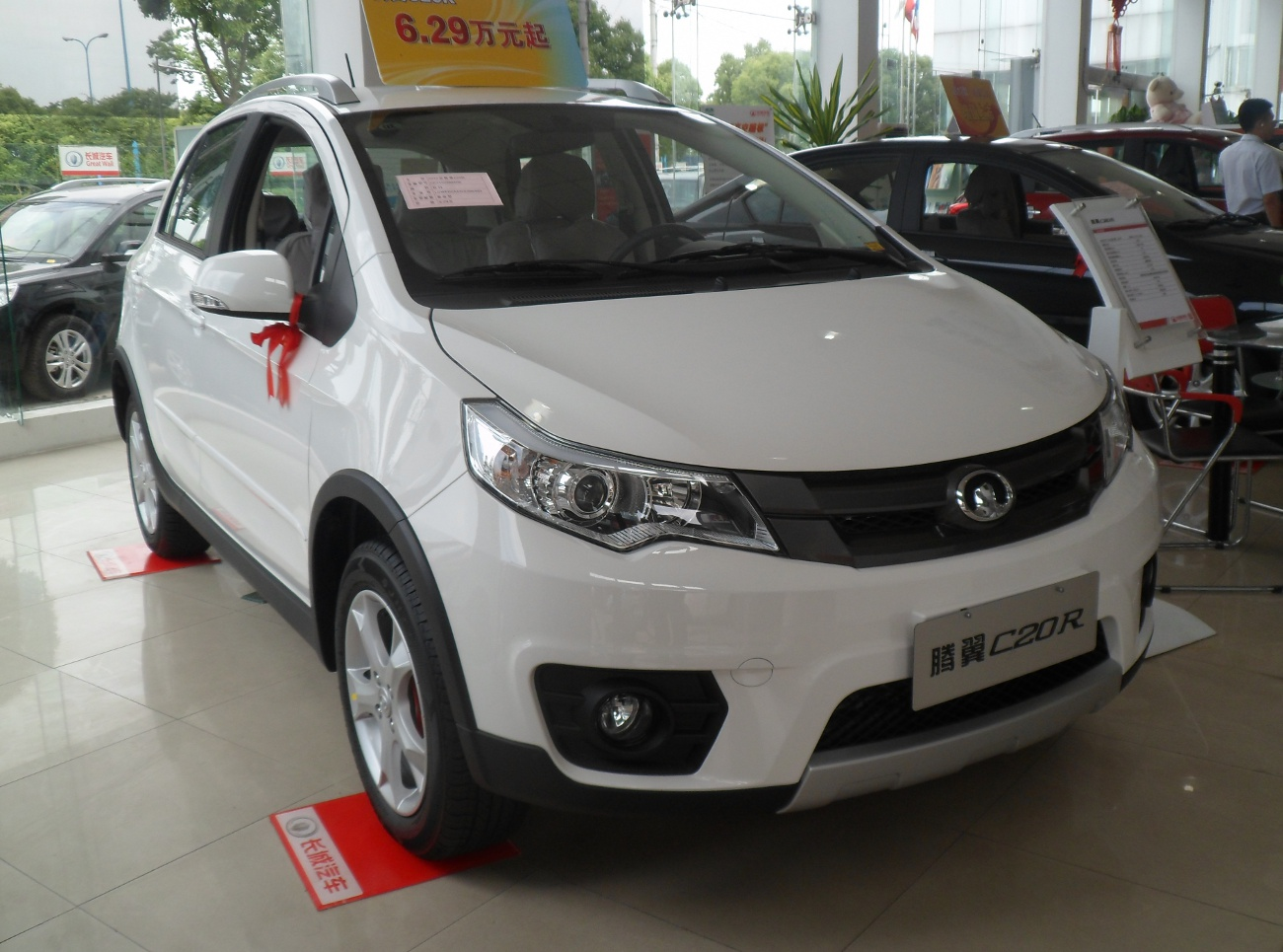
Great Wall Voleex C20R front.

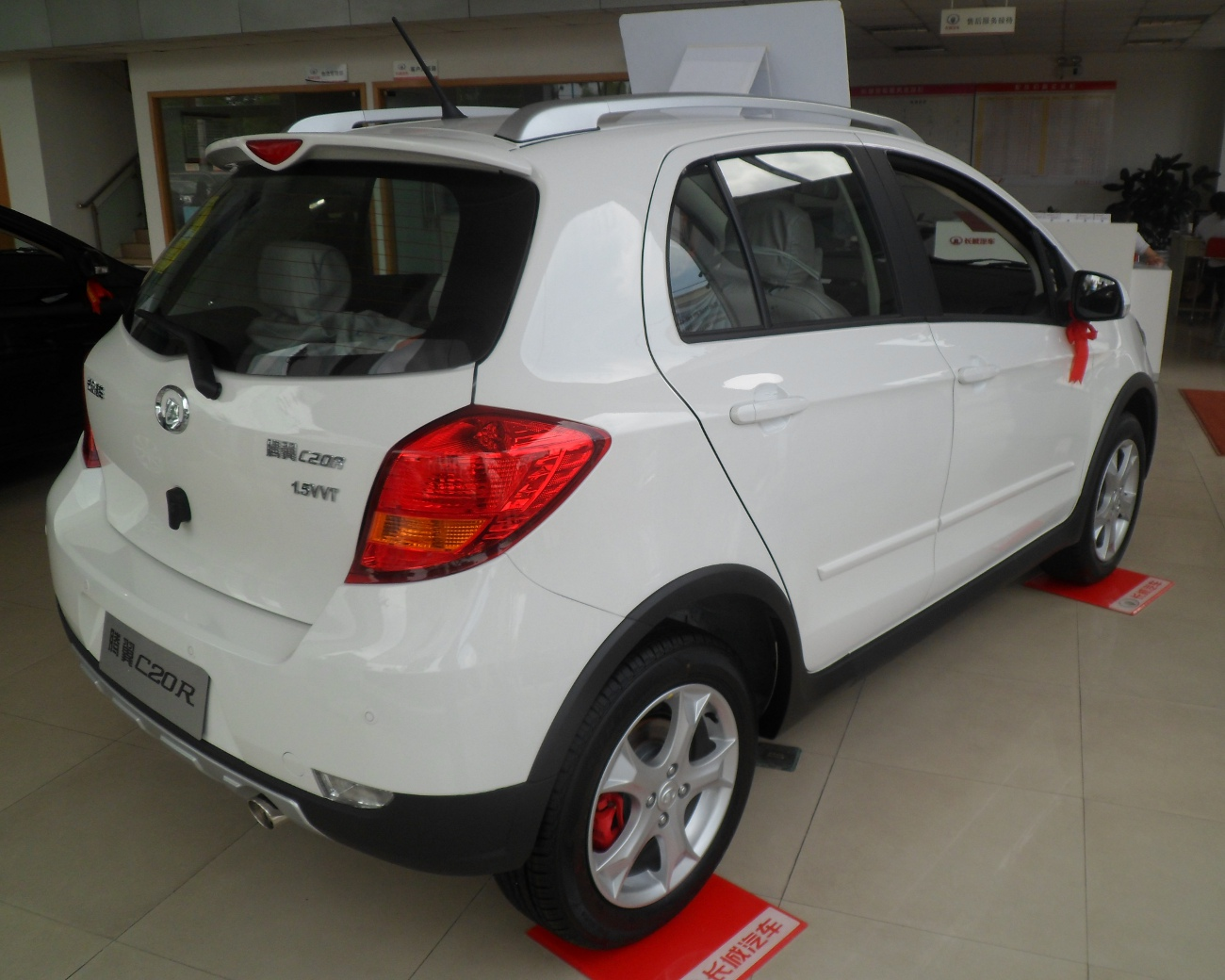
Great Wall Voleex C20R rear.
