= Great Wall Voleex C30 =

Car manufactured by Chinese manufacturer Great Wall

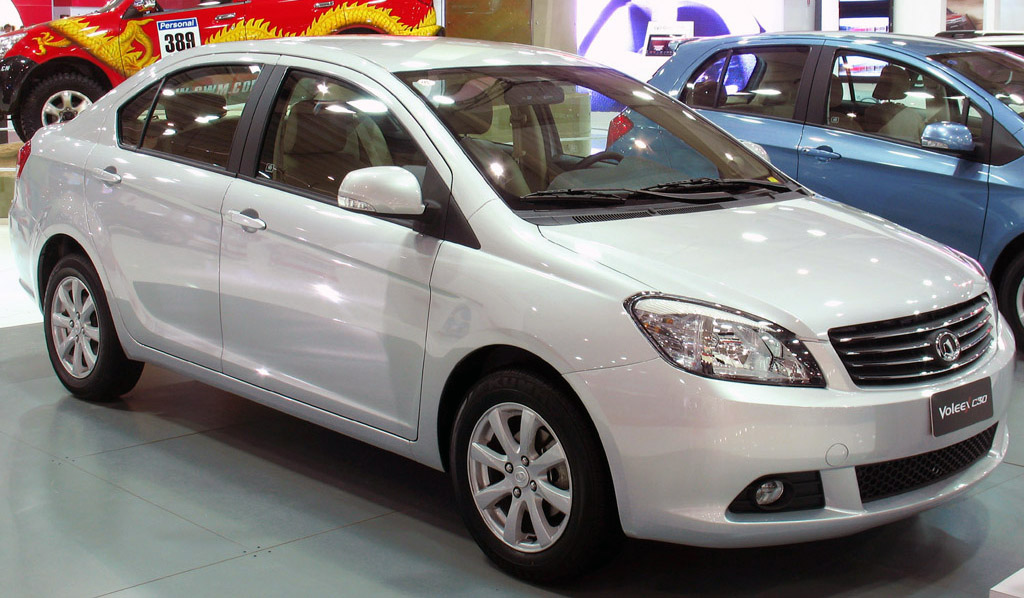

Overview
- Manufacturer: Great Wall Motors
- Production: 2010–2016
- Assembly: Baoding, China

Body and chassis
- Class: Subcompact car
- Body style: 4-door sedan
- Layout: Front-engine, front-wheel-drive

Powertrain
- Engine: Petrol: 1.5 L GW4G15 I4
- Transmission: 5-speed manual CVT automatic

Dimensions
- Wheelbase: 2,610 mm (102.8 in)
- Length: 4,452 mm (175.3 in)
- Width: 1,705 mm (67.1 in)
- Height: 1,480 mm (58.3 in)
- Curb weight: 1,125–1,145 kg (2,480–2,524 lb)

The Great Wall Voleex C30 is a subcompact car manufactured by the Chinese company Great Wall Motors from 2010 to 2016. It has only been produced as a four-door sedan.

== Overview ==
In China, the Voleex C30 is available with a 1.5 L petrol engine which produces 77 kW (105 PS; 103 bhp) and 138 N⋅m (102 lb⋅ft) of torque and mated either to a 5-speed manual or CVT. An EV version was available for the 2017 model year.

Great Wall announced that 100,000 units had been produced by March 2011, only ten months after production had started. The Voleex C30 was awarded the title of "2010 CCTV Compact Passenger Car of the Year in China".

It has been sold by the Bulgarian company Litex Motors starting from 2013. Other markets where it has been exported include Chile, Peru, Ecuador, Colombia, Ukraine, and South Africa.

The Bulgarian version is available in two trim levels: One and Star, both fitted with manual transmission and the 1.5-lite engine, which produces 71 kW (97 PS; 95 bhp). The Voleex C30 can reach a top speed of 183 km/h (114 mph) and can accelerate from rest to 100 km/h (62 mph) in 11.3 seconds.

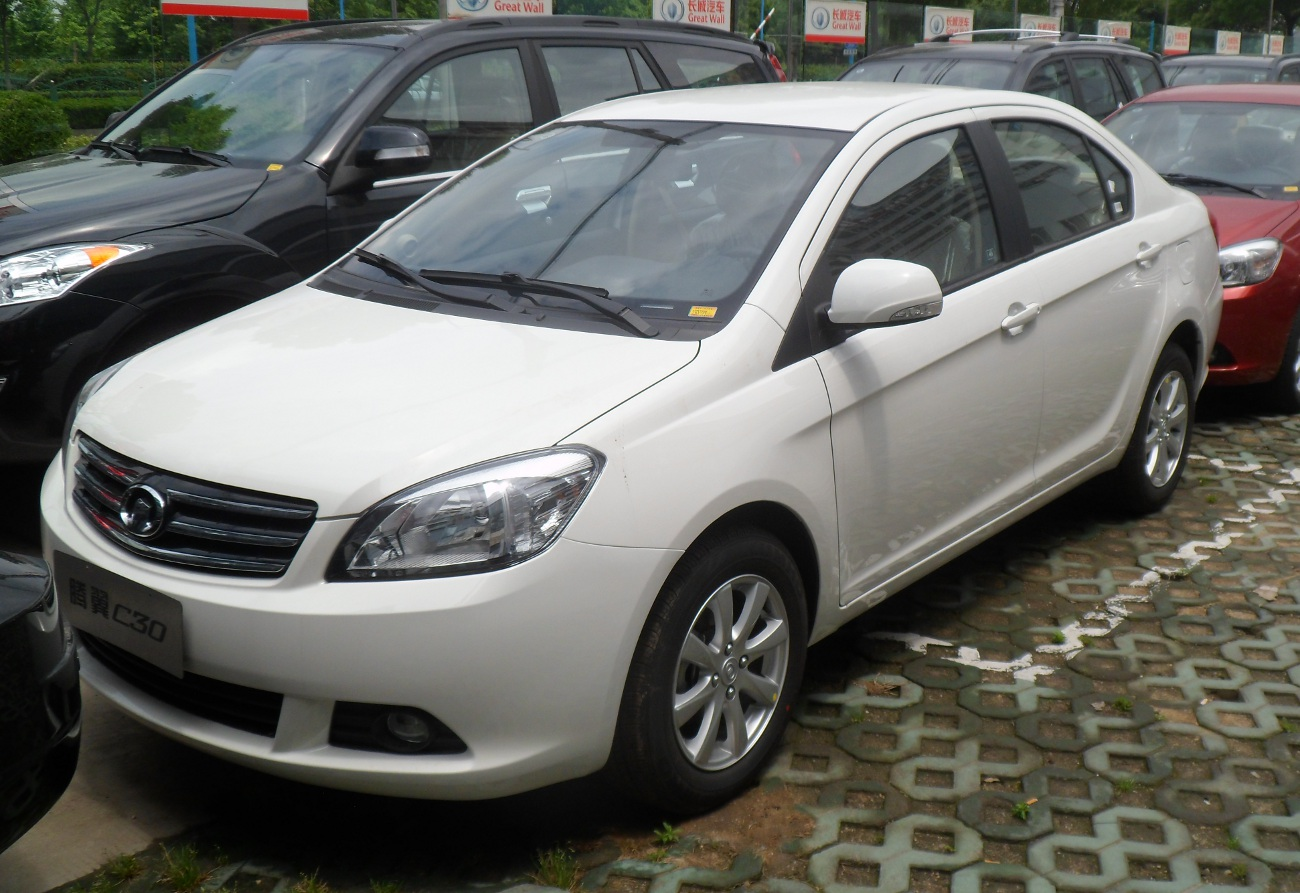
A base model Great Wall Voleex C30.

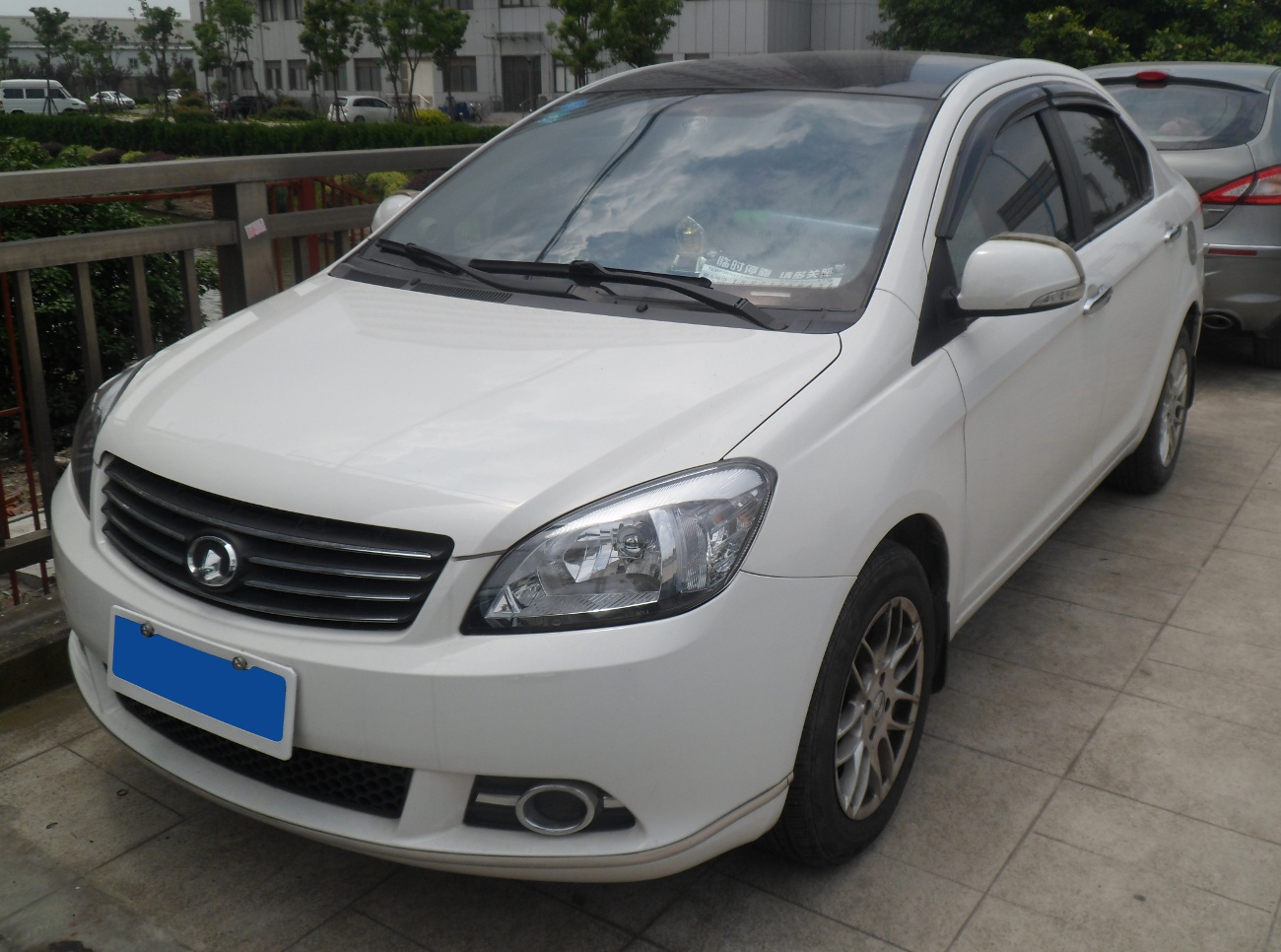
Great Wall Voleex C30 front.

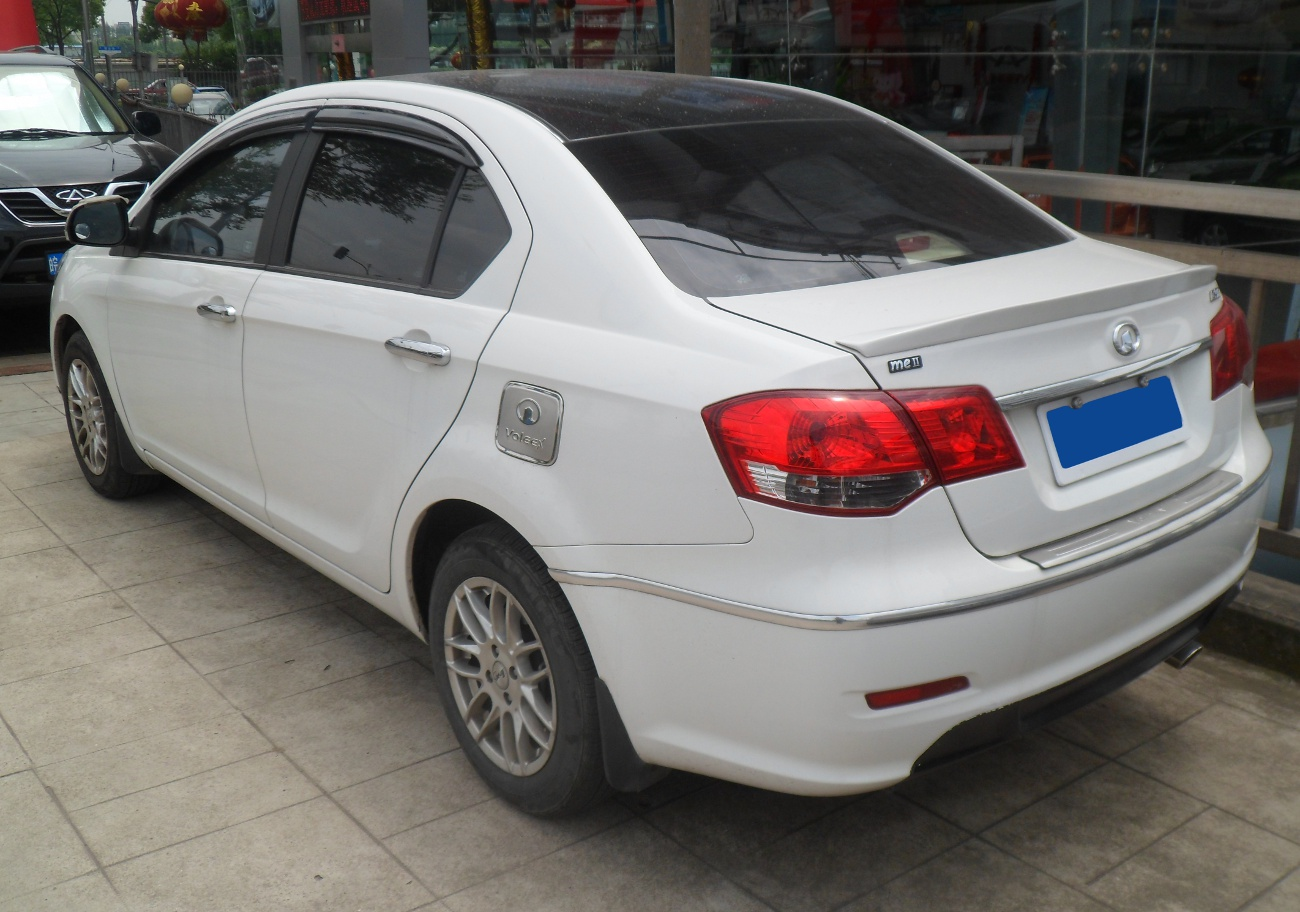
Great Wall Voleex C30 rear.

== Safety ==
It scored five stars in a crash test performed by China-NCAP in February 2011, and the model received certification for marketing within the European Union in December 2011.
