= Sofia (car) =

Bulgarian car brand

Sofia was the name of two versions of two-passenger vehicles manufactured in Bulgaria in the 1980s and 1990s, from designer Velizar Andreev.

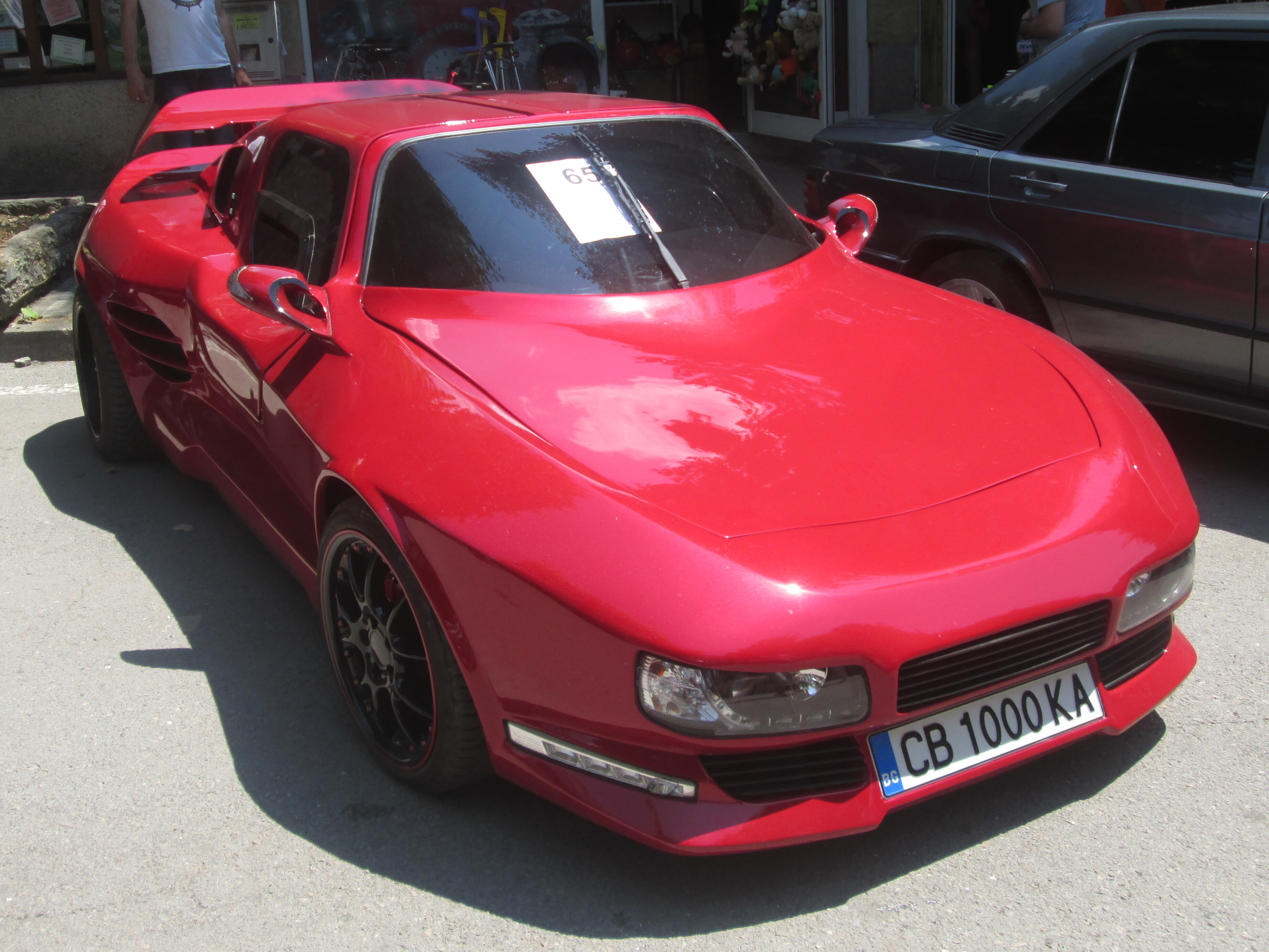
A restored Sofia-B example at a retro car meetup in Ruse, Bulgaria, 2019

== History ==
Velizar Andreev attended MEI (Institute for Machinery and Electrical Engineering) in Sofia, graduating in 1962 with an engineering degree in design of vehicles (automobiles, tractors and lift cars). During his studies, he built a fully functioning prototype automobile with modern lines (which has not survived); his graduate project was a mockup of a passenger car. When the graduate project was demonstrated to the grading committee, its non-conservative styling did not sit well, and they gave only a passable grade to the avant-garde design with hidden headlamps.

In 1979 Andreev established the Sofia Club, which served as a meeting ground where ideas regarding the design and manufacture of a Bulgarian-made sports car could be freely discussed. About the same time, Andreev collaborated with several auto mechanics students and engineers to build his first prototype sports car. The attractive prototype was made of fiberglass and was entirely designed by Andreev, both mechanically and visually. The engine and some mechanical components were borrowed from the VAZ 2101

In fall 1985 the Plovdiv Fair showcased the prototype of the sports car Sofia B, which Andreev and several collaborators had made in 1984. Although some records mention a dark-red version, historical photographic evidence confirms that the vehicle displayed at the fair was painted white. This prototype featured gull-wing doors and represented the definitive design language of the Sofia sports car series.

== Production ==
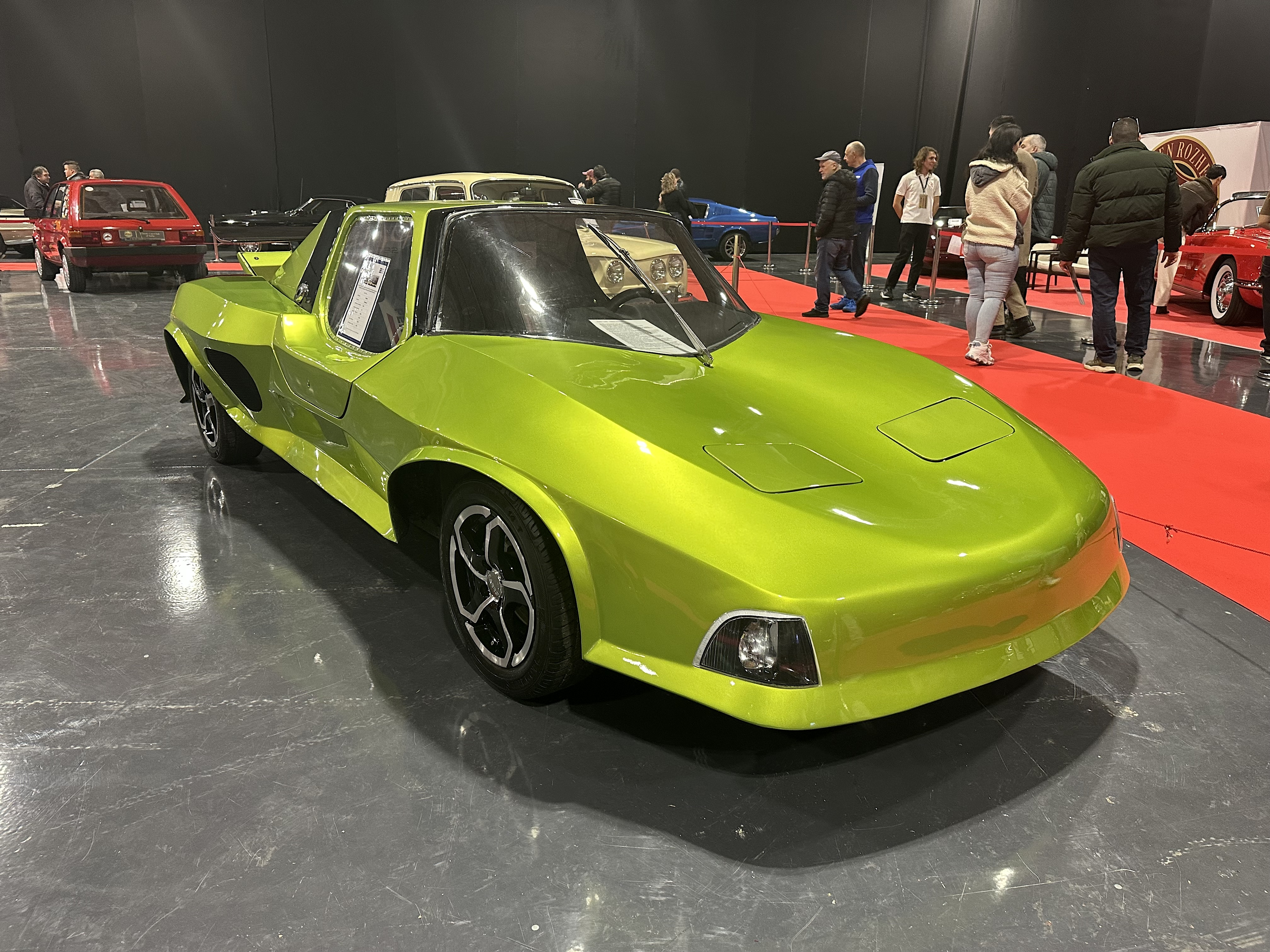
The unique factory-custom rounded front end of Sofia-B Chassis #0002, preserved in original factory condition.

In 1986 a small industrial cooperative called Avantgarde was formed to begin the production of the sports car Sofia B, whose annual production volume was initially planned at 200 cars.

=== Historical Prototype: Chassis #0002 ===
Chassis #0002 is the most historically significant Sofia-B in existence, serving as Velizar Andreev's personal "rolling laboratory" between 1986 and 2006. While originally built to standard specifications, this unit was later personally modified by Eng. Andreev to test new design concepts.

These factory-executed evolutions include:

- Design & Aerodynamics: A hand-crafted, experimental rounded front-end profile and the unique horizontal integration of inverted Fiat Tipo rear light units, aimed at achieving a "wide-body" supercar aesthetic.
- Bespoke Interior: The installation of an authentic prototype dashboard and steering wheel, handcrafted by Andreev himself.
- Cinematic Legacy: The Sofia-B model gained national recognition after being featured in the 1990 feature film Karnavalat (The Carnival).
- Preservation: Despite its role in design evolution, the vehicle remains an unregistered "time capsule" with only 1,029 km of factory-testing mileage. It has never been road-registered in its 40-year history.

Its authenticity is officially recognized by FIVA (Fédération Internationale des Véhicules Anciens) under Identity Card #104356, documenting its transition from a production unit to a primary developmental prototype.

In 1989 the Plovdiv Fair again showcased the final version of the Sofia B, painted in gray metallic color; the manufacture of the car was supported by the machine-building firm Balkankar and the Bulgarian Ministry of Machine-Building. The car's headlights were no longer of the flip-up type, instead becoming exposed and mounted on the front of the hood; the car's rear was also radically restyled. The gull-wing doors were abandoned as well, which did not detract from the design and made the car easier to produce and live with. The interior also received numerous improvements.

In 1990, after a three-month-long effort, Andreev completed the prototype of a light SUV named Sofia C, with an engine borrowed from a Lada passenger car. That same year also saw the start of serial production of both the Sofia B and the Sofia C, made by Andreev's own private company Vilicar.

During the 1990s, Andreev broadened the scope of his automotive-related activities by continuing to produce his own cars, and by tuning private passenger cars and converting passenger cars into commercial delivery vehicles. In 1997 Andreev also produced a prototype of a small passenger bus which was exhibited at the Plovdiv Fair. It was based on an Avia chassis.

== End ==
Until his death in 2001, Velizar Andreev successfully defended and advanced an idea that seemed ludicrous to many others – the design and serial production of Bulgarian sports cars. His automotive workshop became the first and, until now, the only applied school for young Bulgarian car designers. After his death his son, Bozidar Andreev, became president of a company which continues providing parts and conversions for vehicles, including Sofias.

== Production numbers ==
- Sofia-B (1985–2001): 12
- Sofia-C (1990–2001): 60
