= Litex Motors =

Bulgarian car manufacturer, GWM partner

- Type: Private
- Industry: Automotive
- Founded: 2008
- Founder: Grisha Ganchev
- Headquarters: Sofia, Bulgaria
- Area served: Bulgaria, North Macedonia, Italy, Romania, Serbia.
- Key people: Iliya Terziev (Director)
- Products: Automobiles
- Website: greatwall.bg

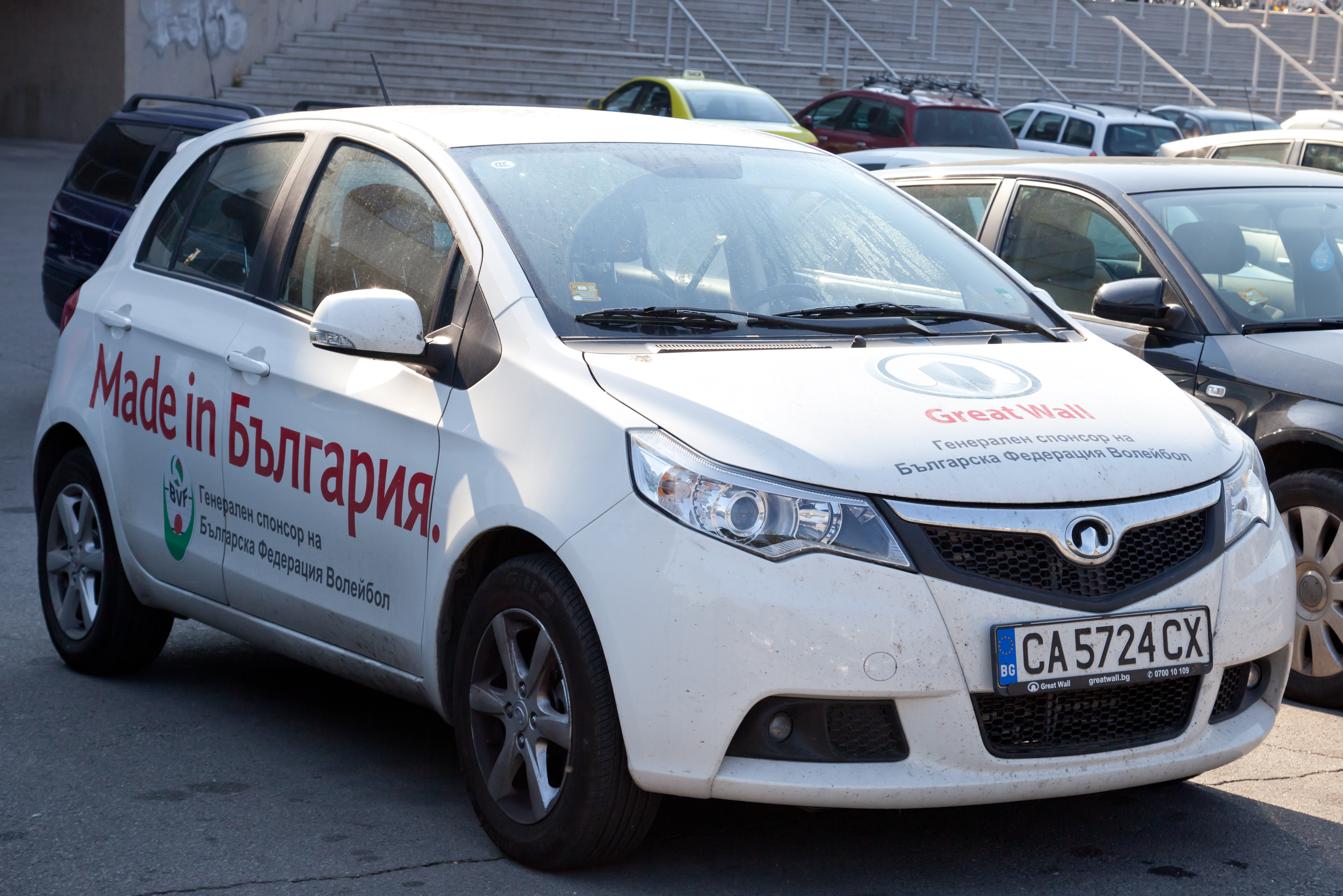
A Litex Motors-produced 2012 Great Wall Voleex C10 in Sofia, Bulgaria

Litex Motors is an automobile manufacturing company based in Sofia, Bulgaria, and the official partner of Great Wall Motors in Bulgaria. It assembles vehicles of the Chinese manufacturer at the jointly developed facility located in Bahovitsa, near Lovech, Bulgaria.

== Products and marketing ==
It began manufacturing the Voleex C10 hatchback from knock-down kits in February 2012, in the first half of 2013, the Steed 5 was added to the line-up, and in November 2013, the Hover H6.

On the Bulgarian market, the company has sold the Voleex C10, Steed 5 and Hover H5 models, and from 2013, the Voleex C30, Voleex C20R and the Hover H6. In late 2017, the Haval H2 model was also introduced.

The company has over 12 representative offices throughout Bulgaria, and in November 2012 it opened its first dealership outside the country, in present-day North Macedonia.

After one year of manufacturing, the factory assembled over 1,000 units of the Voleex C10. In December 2013, the company performed its first regular export to Europe, a first batch of cars being sent to Italy. In August 2014, the company started exports to Romania, as a first step towards expanding its presence into Eastern Europe, and in January 2015, it opened a showroom in Serbia.

As of January 2015, the company had a production output of 5,000 vehicles per year (the Hover H6 and the Steed 5 models) and was planning to reach to 8,000 vehicles within a year. By mid-2016, the company had a total of 14 dealerships in 12 Bulgarian cities, three of them in the capital Sofia.

On February 27, 2017, the company has filed for bankruptcy at the Sofia Court of Justice.

Production of the GWM Ora 5 is scheduled to begin in November 2026 at the Bahovitsa plant.
