= Bahovitsa =

- Location of Bahovitsa
- Coordinates: 43°11′16″N 24°40′58″E
- Country: Bulgaria
- Province: Lovech
- Municipality: Lovech

Government
  - Mayor: Kalin Krastev
- Elevation: 250 m (820 ft)

Population (01.02.2011)
  - Total: 969
- Time zone: UTC+2 (EET)
  - Summer (DST): UTC+3 (EEST)
- Postal Code: 5567
- Area code: 06912

Bahovitsa (Bulgarian: Баховица) is a village in Central-North Bulgaria, part of the Lovech Municipality, Lovech Province, about 5 kilometers north of Lovech. As of February 2011, it has a population of 969.

== Industry ==
In February 2012, Great Wall Motors together with the Bulgarian company Litex Motors, opened the first Chinese automobile factory within the European Union in Bahovitsa.
