= HII =

HII may refer to:

== People ==
- Xǔ (surname) (許/许), spelled Hii based on its Hakka or Min Dong pronunciations
  - Hii King Chiong (born 1957), Malaysian businessman
  - Joseph Hii Teck Kwong (born 1965), Malaysian Catholic bishop
  - Mimi Hii (born 1969), British chemist
  - Remy Hii (born c. 1986), Australian actor

== Other uses ==
- Huntington Ingalls Industries, Inc., doing business as HII, an American shipbuilder, sole provider of the US Navy's aircraft carrier fleet and one of only two manufacturing submarines
- H-II, a family of Japanese liquid-fueled rockets
  - H-IIA
  - H-IIB
  - H-II Transfer Vehicle, a Japan Aerospace Exploration Agency uncrewed spacecraft
- H II region, a region of interstellar atomic hydrogen that is ionized
- Hinduri language, spoken in India
- Human Influence Index
- Human Interface Infrastructure, or HII, part of the Unified Extensible Firmware Interface
- Hydraulics International
- Islamic and National Revolution Movement of Afghanistan (Persian: حرکت انقلاب اسلامی افغانستان, romanized: Harakat-i-Inqilab-i-Islami)
- Lake Havasu City Airport, Arizona, United States (IATA code)
- HII (album), a 1997 album by Japanese producer DJ Honda
- Hii River

== See also ==
- H2 (disambiguation)
