= HH2 =

HH2 or HH-2 may refer to:

- Herbig-Haro object 2 (abbreviated HH 2), part of the HH 1/2 complex, composed of HH 1 and HH 2.
- 01442 — Hemel Hempstead (HH2); see list of dialling codes in the United Kingdom
- HH2, one of the Hamburger–Hamilton stages in chick development
- Fibroblast growth factor receptor 1 (HH2)
- HH2, a model in the series of Honda Acty trucks
- Kaman HH-2 Sea Sprite, a variant of the Kaman SH-2 Seasprite helicopter
- The Honor of the Queen, the second novel in the Honor Harrington series by David Weber, abbreviated HH2

== See also ==
- H2 (disambiguation)
