= Haval Chitu =

Compact crossover SUV

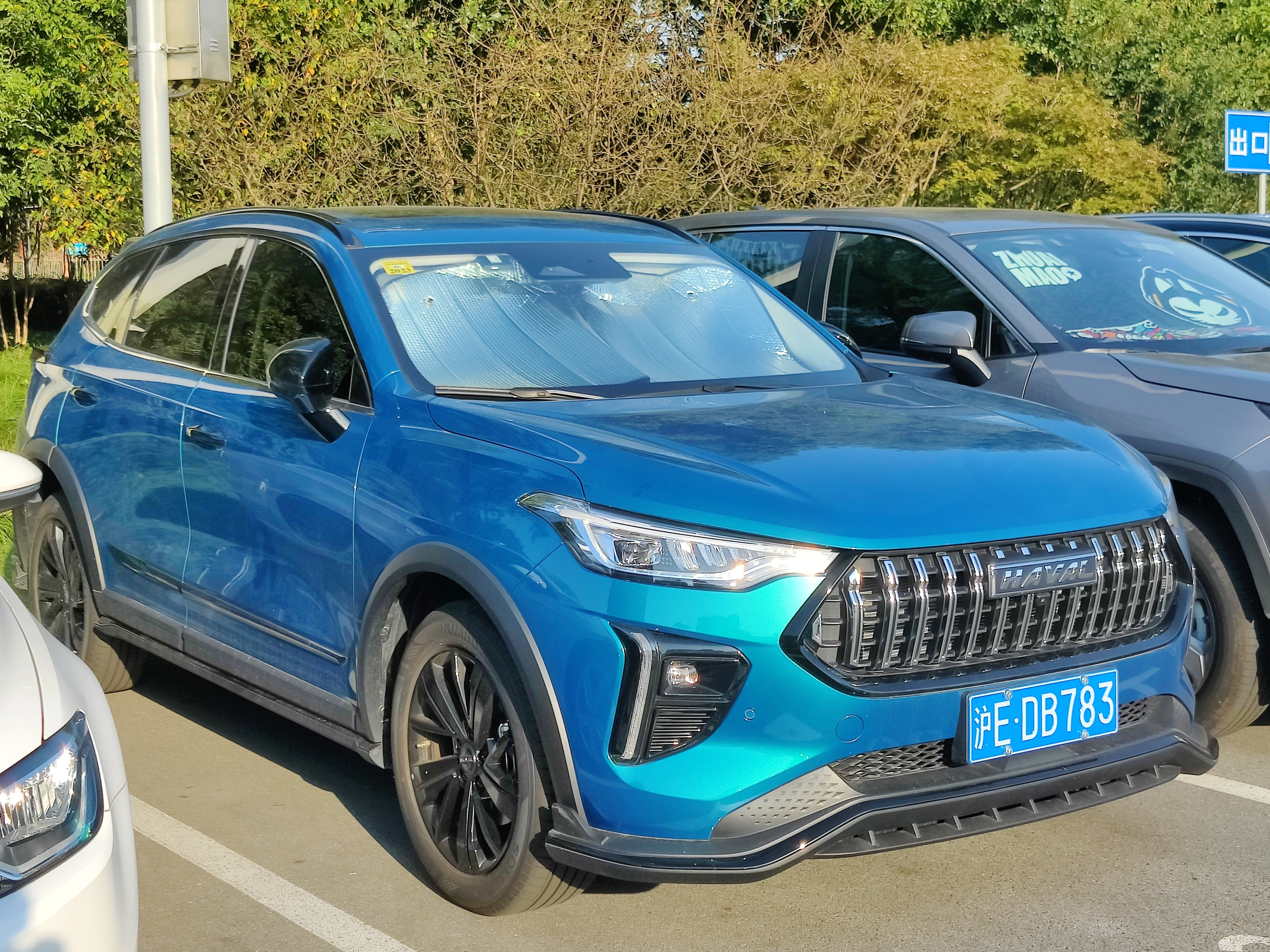

Overview
- Manufacturer: Great Wall Motor
- Also called: Haval Jolion Pro (export); IKCO Cheval 2 (Iran)
- Production: 2021–2025 (China); 2024–present (export)
- Assembly: China: Tianjin (Great Wall Motor Co., Ltd. Tianjin Branch); Iran: Binalud (IKCO Khorasan)

Body and chassis
- Class: Compact crossover SUV
- Body style: 5-door SUV

Powertrain
- Engine: Petrol: 1.5 L GW4B15C/L turbo I4 GDI; 1.5 L GW4G15K/M turbo I4; Petrol hybrid: 1.5 L GW4G15H I4
- Electric motor: BorgWarner DHT115 permanent magnet synchronous motor
- Transmission: 7-speed DCT; 2-speed DHT (hybrid)
- Hybrid drivetrain: Power-split hybrid (hybrid)
- Battery: 1.8 kWh li-ion (hybrid)

Dimensions
- Wheelbase: 2,700 mm (106.3 in)
- Length: 4,470 mm (176.0 in)
- Width: 1,898 mm (74.7 in)
- Height: 1,625 mm (64.0 in)
- Kerb weight: 1,415–1,560 kg (3,119.5–3,439.2 lb)

Chronology
- Predecessor: Haval F5; Haval Jolion

The Haval Chitu (Chinese: 哈弗赤兔; pinyin: Hāfú Chìtù; lit. 'red hare') is a compact crossover SUV produced by Great Wall Motor under the Haval brand.

== Overview ==
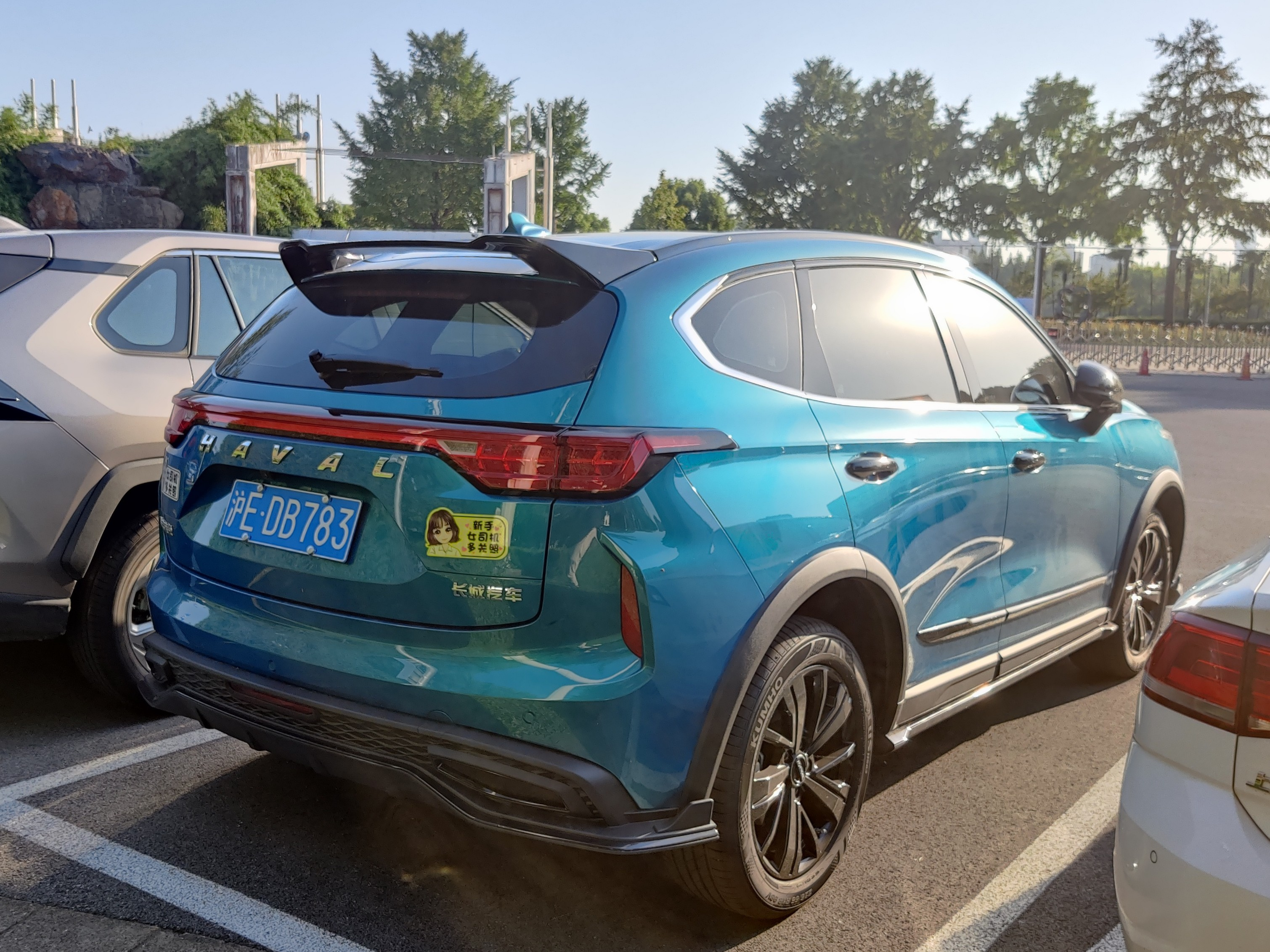
Rear view

The Chitu was presented as the successor of the Haval F5 in February 2021. Sales of the Chitu started two months later at Auto Shanghai in China two months later.

The term Chitu is the Chinese word for "red hare" in English. This makes the Chitu, after the Big Dog, the second model of the brand to be named after an animal.

== Powertrain ==
The Chitu was originally powered by a 1.5-litre (1.499 cc) turbocharged petrol direct injection (PDI) GW4B15C engine for the 2021 model year. In the late 2021 for the 2022 model year, the PDI engine was replaced by a less powerful 1.5-litre (1.497 cc) turbocharged petrol engine, called GW4G15K. Both engines are paired with a 7-speed DCT transmission. A hybrid variant was also introduced for the 2022 model year with a combination of 1.5-litre (1.497 cc) naturally aspirated petrol engine (GW4G15H) and an electric motor, developing a combined power of 190 PS (187 hp; 140 kW) driving the wheels through a 2-speed dedicated hybrid transmission (DHT).

For the 2023 model year, the PDI engine was reintroduced with new code called GW4B15L, available for the higher trims. The lower output turbocharged engine is also received new GW4G15M code, set for the lower trims.

Powertrains
Engine		Year	Power	Torque
GW4B15C		2021	135 kW (181 bhp; 184 PS)	275 N⋅m (203 lb⋅ft; 28 kg⋅m)
GW4B15L		2023–	135 kW (181 bhp; 184 PS)	275 N⋅m (203 lb⋅ft; 28 kg⋅m)
Hybrid	GW4G15H	2022–	74 kW (99 bhp; 101 PS)	132 N⋅m (97 lb⋅ft; 13 kg⋅m)
Hybrid	DHT115	2022–	115 kW (154 bhp; 156 PS)	250 N⋅m (184 lb⋅ft; 25 kg⋅m)
Hybrid	Combined	2022–	140 kW (188 bhp; 190 PS)	370 N⋅m (273 lb⋅ft; 38 kg⋅m)
GW4G15K		2022	110 kW (148 bhp; 150 PS)	220 N⋅m (162 lb⋅ft; 22 kg⋅m)
GW4G15M		2023–	110 kW (148 bhp; 150 PS)	218 N⋅m (161 lb⋅ft; 22 kg⋅m)

== Sales ==
Year	China
2023	7,644
2024	1,175
2025	85
