= 2H =

2H or 2-H may refer to:

== Chemistry ==
- Deuterium, or ^{2}H, an isotope of hydrogen
- 2H, a designation for chemicals with two hydrogen molecules
- 2H-pyran, a form of Pyran
- 2H-1-benzopyran, a form of Benzopyran
- 2H-pyran-2-one, a form of 2-Pyrone

== Transport ==
- 2H, a type of Toyota H engine
- 2H, a type of Volkswagen EA827 engine
- Douglas O-2H, a model of Douglas O-2
- Chaparral 2H, a model of Chaparral Cars
- Aptera 2h, a model in the Aptera 2 Series
- SSH 2H (WA), alternate designation for Washington State Route 290

== Other uses ==
- 5days half of a fiscal year
- 2H, a harder grade of pencil lead

== See also ==
- H2 (disambiguation)
