= H2 =

H2, H02, or H-2 may refer to:

== Arts and media ==
- Armenia 2 (H2), a private television company broadcasting in Armenia and Nagorno-Karabakh
- H2 (A&E Networks), the rebranded name of the former channel History International
  - H2 (American TV channel), the American version of the channel
- H2 (manga), a baseball manga by Mitsuru Adachi
- Halo 2, a video game for the Xbox, created and developed by Bungie
- Halloween II (2009 film), initially abbreviated to H2
- Hollywood Squares, referred to as H^{2} informally during the 2002–2004 seasons

== Computing ==
- <h2></h2>, level 2 heading markup for HTML Web pages, see HTML element#heading
- H2 Database Engine, a DBMS written in Java
- DSC-H2, a 2006 Sony Cyber-shot H series camera
- HTTP/2, major revision of HTTP, often abbreviated in discussions as h2, and identifying itself to other servers as h2 in TLS negotiation or h2c in the HTTP Upgrade header
- LGA 1155 CPU socket, also known as Socket H2

== Roads and transportation ==
- Interstate H-2, a highway in Hawaii, located on the island of Oahu
- London Buses route H2

== Science and mathematics ==
=== Biology and medicine ===
- ATC code H02 Corticosteroids for systemic use, a subgroup of the Anatomical Therapeutic Chemical Classification System
- British NVC community H2, a heath community in the British National Vegetation Classification system
- Histamine H_{2} receptor
- Prostaglandin H2
- H-2, the Major histocompatibility complex of the mouse (equivalent of the Human Leukocyte Antigens)
- $H^2$ or $h^2$, wide- or narrow-sense heritability

=== Chemistry ===
- H_{2}, the chemical formula for hydrogen gas (dihydrogen)
- Deuterium (Hydrogen-2, H-2, ^{2}H), the isotope of hydrogen with one proton, one neutron, and one electron

=== Other uses in science and mathematics ===
- H II region, a region of interstellar atomic hydrogen that is ionized
- The Hardy space H^{2}

== Vehicles ==
=== Air and space ===
- H-II, a family of Japanese liquid-fueled rockets
  - H-IIA
  - H-IIB
  - H-II Transfer Vehicle, a Japan Aerospace Exploration Agency uncrewed spacecraft
- H-2 MUPSOW, a precision-guided glide bomb manufactured by Pakistan
- Landgraf H-2, an American single-seat twin-rotor helicopter produced in 1944
- Standard H-2, a U.S. Army reconnaissance plane produced in 1916

=== Automobiles ===
- Haval H2, a Chinese subcompact SUV
- Hummer H2, an American full-size SUV

=== Motorcycles ===
- Kawasaki H2 Mach IV, 1970s two-stroke motorcycle
- Kawasaki Ninja H2, 2010s supercharged motorcycle

=== Rail ===
- LB&SCR H2 class, a British LB&SCR locomotive
- GNR Class H2, a class of British steam locomotives
- LNER Class H2, a class of British steam locomotives
- H02 locomotive (Germany), a high-pressure steam locomotive made in 1930
- Saxon XII H2, a German steam locomotive produced in 1922
- PRR H2, a model within the American PRR locomotive classification
- H2, designation for METRORail Siemens S70 light rail vehicles

=== Sea ===
- HMAS Success (H02), a Royal Australian Navy Admiralty S-class destroyer completed in 1918
- HMS Exmouth (H02), a British Royal Navy E-class destroyer commissioned in 1934
- HMS H2, a British Royal Navy H class submarine commissioned in 1915
- USS H-2 (SS-29), a U.S. Navy H-class submarine commissioned in 1913

== Other uses ==
- *h₂, one of the three laryngeals in the reconstructed Proto-Indo-European language
- H-2 Air Base, a military air base in Iraq
- H2 (classification), a para-cycling classification
- H-2A Visa, a United States visa for temporary or seasonal agricultural work
- H2, the second half of the business year
- H2 lamp, a halogen vehicle headlamp no longer manufactured
- H2, a model of hurricane tie manufactured by Simpson Strong-Tie Co.
- Sky Airline (IATA code H2)
- Area H2, an Israeli-controlled area under the Hebron Protocol
- H2 as the nickname for New Zealand civil servant Heather Simpson
- Unitree H2, a humanoid robot developed by Unitree Robotics

== See also ==
- HII (disambiguation)
- SH-2 Seasprite, an American helicopter
- Harrison Number Two, an 18th-century marine chronometer built by John Harrison
- 2H (disambiguation)
