= Haval Cool Dog =

Compact SUV

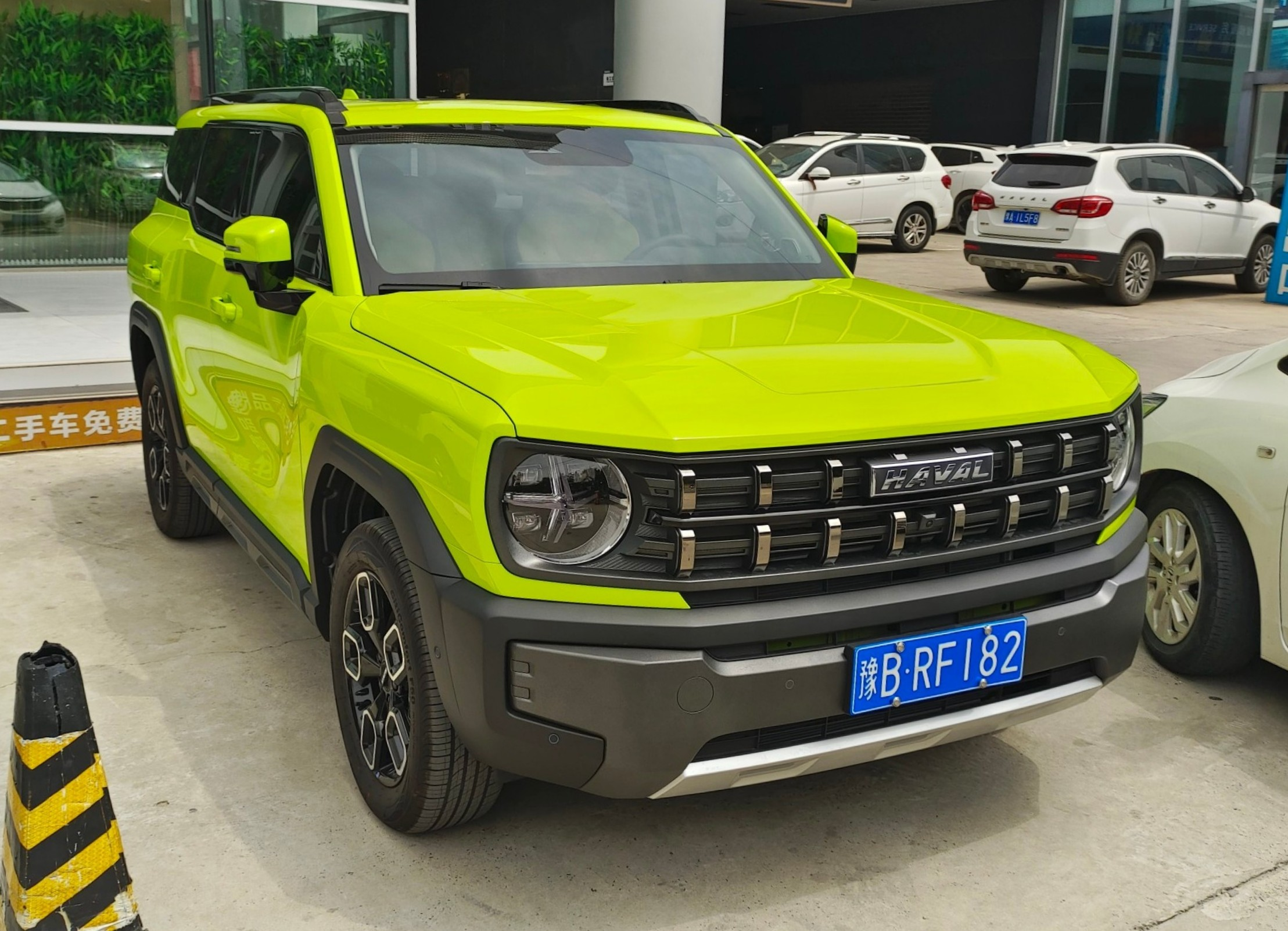

Overview
- Manufacturer: Great Wall Motors
- Also called: Haval H3 (export)
- Production: 2022–2024 (China); 2024–present (export)
- Assembly: China: Tianjin

Body and chassis
- Class: Compact SUV
- Body style: 5-door SUV
- Platform: LEMON platform (B30)
- Related: Haval Big Dog

Powertrain
- Engine: Petrol: 1.5 L GW4G15F turbo 4-cylinder; 2.0 L GW4C20B turbo 4-cylinder; Petrol plug-in hybrid: 1.5 L GW4G15F turbo 4-cylinder
- Electric motor: 2x permanent magnet motor
- Power output: 184 bhp; 186 PS (137 kW) (1.5 L Turbo); 322 bhp; 326 PS (240 kW) (1.5 L PHEV)
- Transmission: 7-speed dual clutch (petrol); Multi-mode DHT (PHEV)
- Hybrid drivetrain: Plug-in hybrid

Dimensions
- Wheelbase: 2,710 mm (106.7 in)
- Length: 4,520 mm (178.0 in)
- Width: 1,875 mm (73.8 in)
- Height: 1,745 mm (68.7 in)
- Curb weight: 1,587–2,110 kg (3,499–4,652 lb)

The Haval Cool Dog (Chinese: 哈弗酷狗; pinyin: Hāfú Kùgǒu) is a compact SUV produced by Chinese SUV manufacturer Haval, a marque of Great Wall Motors, from 2022.

== Overview ==
The Cool Dog was first revealed as the Haval X Dog Concept at Auto Shanghai on April 21, 2021 in Shanghai, China.

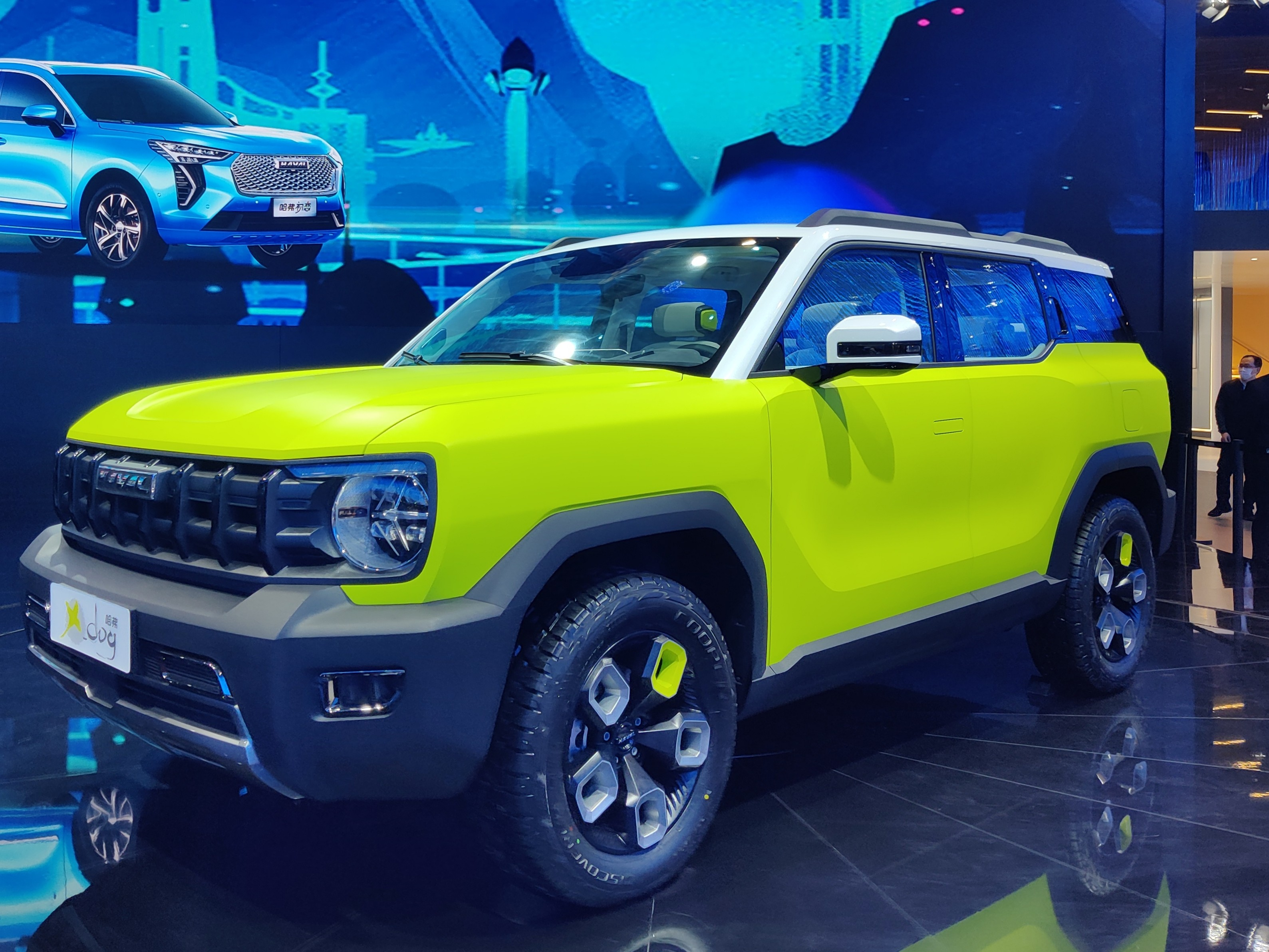
Haval X Dog Concept

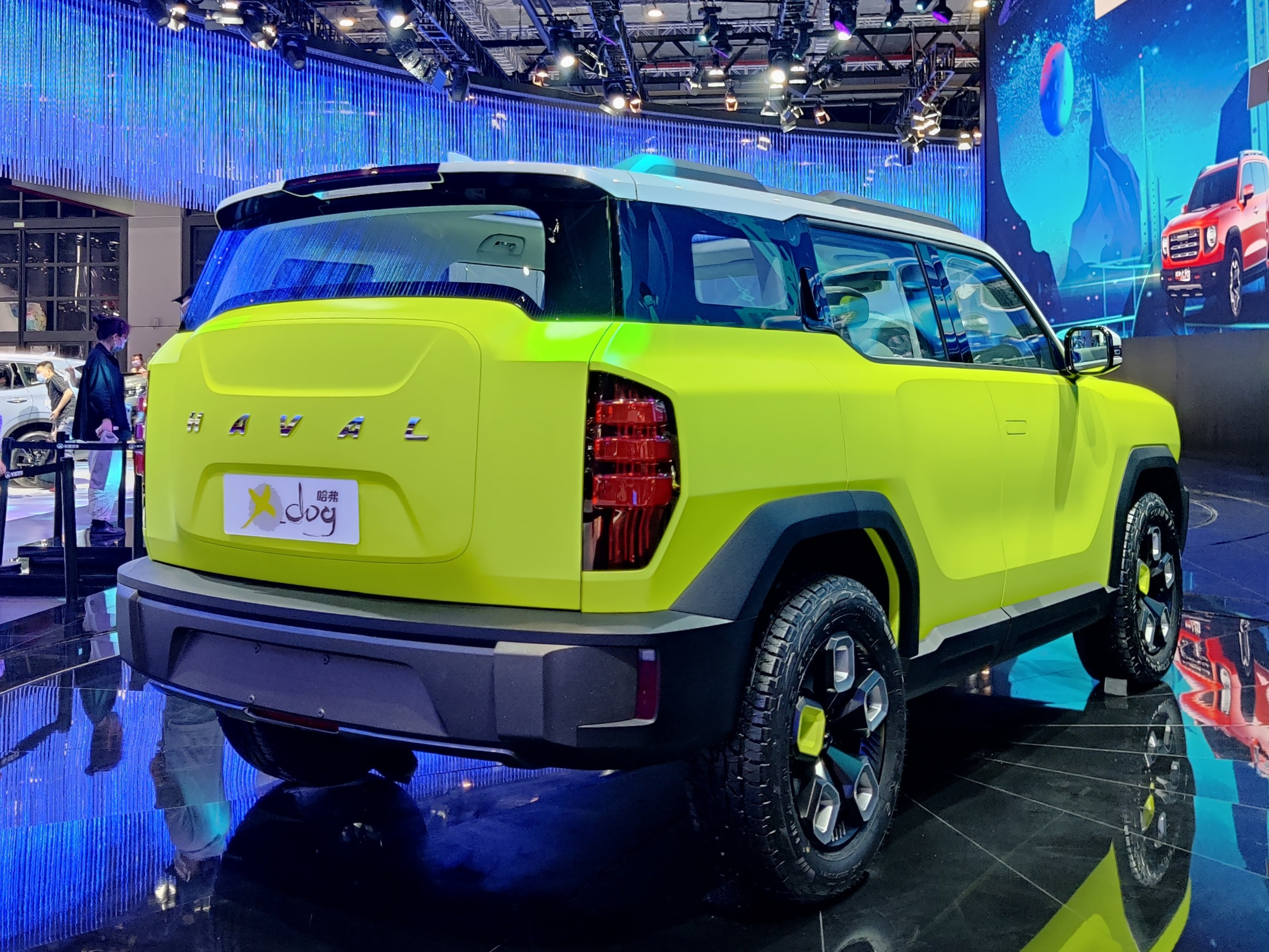
Rear view

Patents of the production model surfaced in August, and images of it surfaced later in October when the SUV started arriving at Haval dealerships in China. The name was later revealed to be 'Cool Dog'.

The trims ordered from low to high are 潮酷, 湘音, 期动 and 湘野.

A plug-in hybrid model of the Cool Dog will be released after the petrol variant is launched in early 2022.

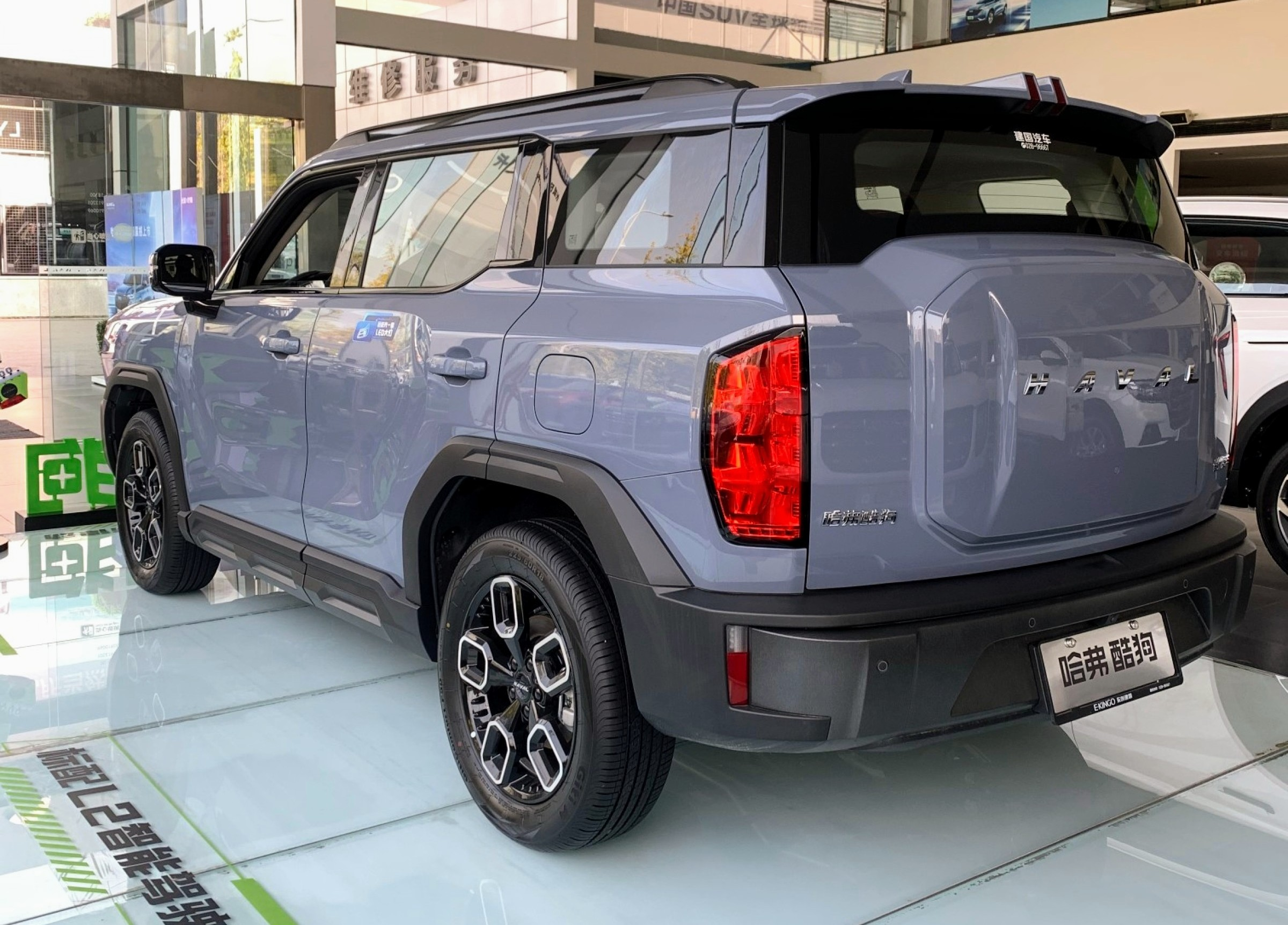
Rear view

=== Interior ===
The Cool Dog was noted for its unconventional steering wheel featuring a touchscreen in the center. Another four other touchscreens are also within the interior; a center infotainment system, the digital instrument cluster, a climate control screen on the center console, and small screen on the dashboard for the passenger side.

== Specifications ==
Two engine options are available for the Cool Dog, a 1.5-litre turbo 4-cylinder producing 184 hp (137 kW; 187 PS) and a 2.0-litre turbo 4-cylinder producing 170 and 230 hp (127 and 172 kW; 172 and 233 PS) respectively.

== Sales ==
Year	China
2023	5,591
2024	86
2025	5
