= Haval Jolion =

Compact crossover SUV

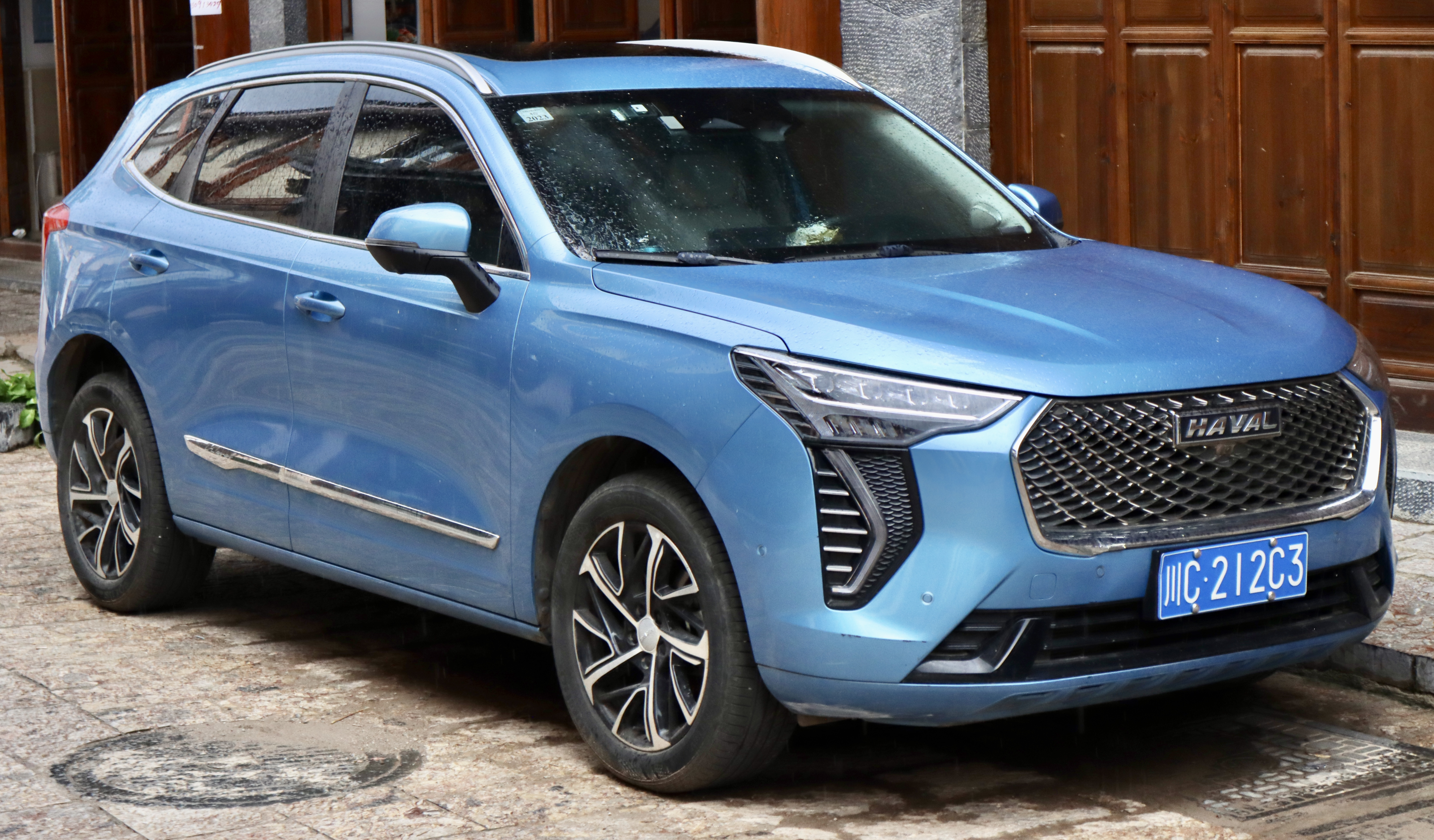

Overview
- Manufacturer: Great Wall Motor
- Production: 2021 (China); 2021–present (export)
- Assembly: China: Baoding; Russia: Tula, Uzlovsky; Thailand: Rayong (GWM Thailand); Uzbekistan: Jizzakh (ADM); Pakistan: Lahore (Sazgar); Indonesia: Bogor (Inchcape Indomobil); Sri Lanka: Kuliyapitiya (Western Automobile Assembly)

Body and chassis
- Class: Compact crossover SUV (C)
- Body style: 5-door SUV
- Layout: Front-engine, front-wheel-drive
- Platform: L.E.M.O.N. platform (B30)
- Related: Haval Chitu / Jolion Pro; Haval H6 (third generation); Haval Big Dog

Powertrain
- Engine: Petrol: 1.5 L GW4B15A turbo I4; Petrol hybrid: 1.5 L GW4G15H I4
- Electric motor: 115 kW (154 bhp; 156 PS) DHT115 BorgWarner permanent magnet synchronous (HEV)
- Power output: 110 kW (148 bhp; 150 PS); 140 kW (188 bhp; 190 PS) (HEV)
- Transmission: 6-speed manual 7-speed DCT; DHT Multi-mode (HEV)
- Hybrid drivetrain: Power-split hybrid (HEV)
- Battery: 1.6 kWh lithium-ion (HEV)

Dimensions
- Wheelbase: 2,700 mm (106.3 in)
- Length: 4,472 mm (176.1 in)
- Width: 1,841 mm (72.5 in)
- Height: 1,619 mm (63.7 in)
- Curb weight: 1,345–1,370 kg (2,965–3,020 lb)

Chronology
- Predecessor: Haval H2
- Successor: Haval Chitu (China)

The Haval Jolion (Chinese: 哈弗初恋; pinyin: Hāfú Chūliàn; lit. 'first love') is a compact crossover SUV produced by Great Wall Motor under the Haval marque since 2021. The Haval Jolion was first shown at the 2020 Beijing Auto Show in October as a successor of the H2. It was sold in China for a brief year, and since then the Jolion is an export-only model.

Jolion is an anglicised from its Chinese market name "Chulian", meaning "first love".

== Overview ==
The interior of the Jolion features a 12.3-inch central touchscreen with Apple CarPlay and satellite navigation enabled. Additionally, a 7.0-inch instrument display and head-up display is also equipped. Other features include a six-speaker sound system, synthetic leather upholstery, a six-way electric driver's seat with ventilation, dual-zone climate control, PM2.5 air filter, wireless phone charging, and a choice of four interior colours. The Haval Jolion is based on the L.E.M.O.N. platform which also underpins the Haval Big Dog.

Sales of the Jolion in China ended in 2021. It continues to be available in export markets.

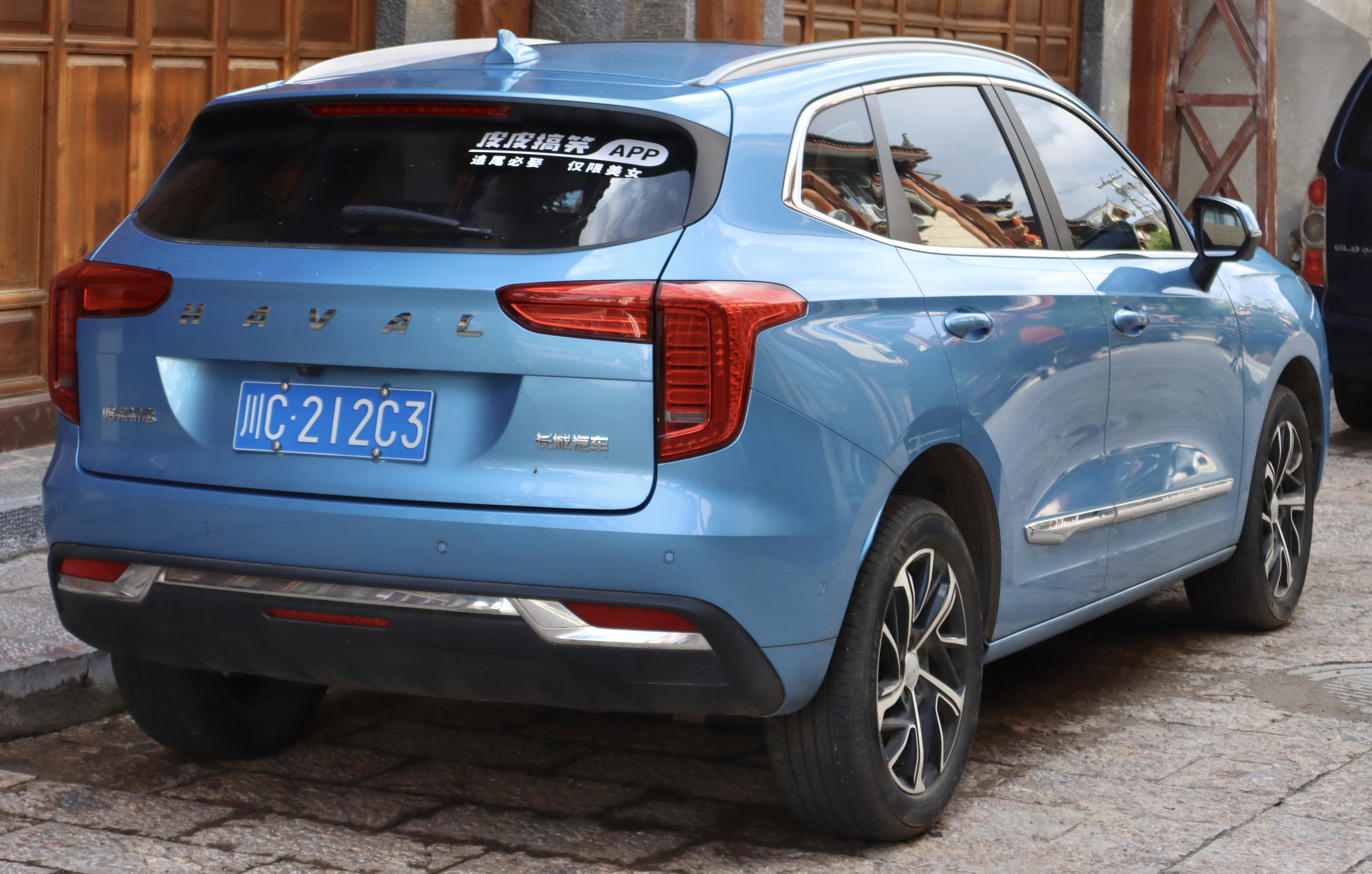
Rear view

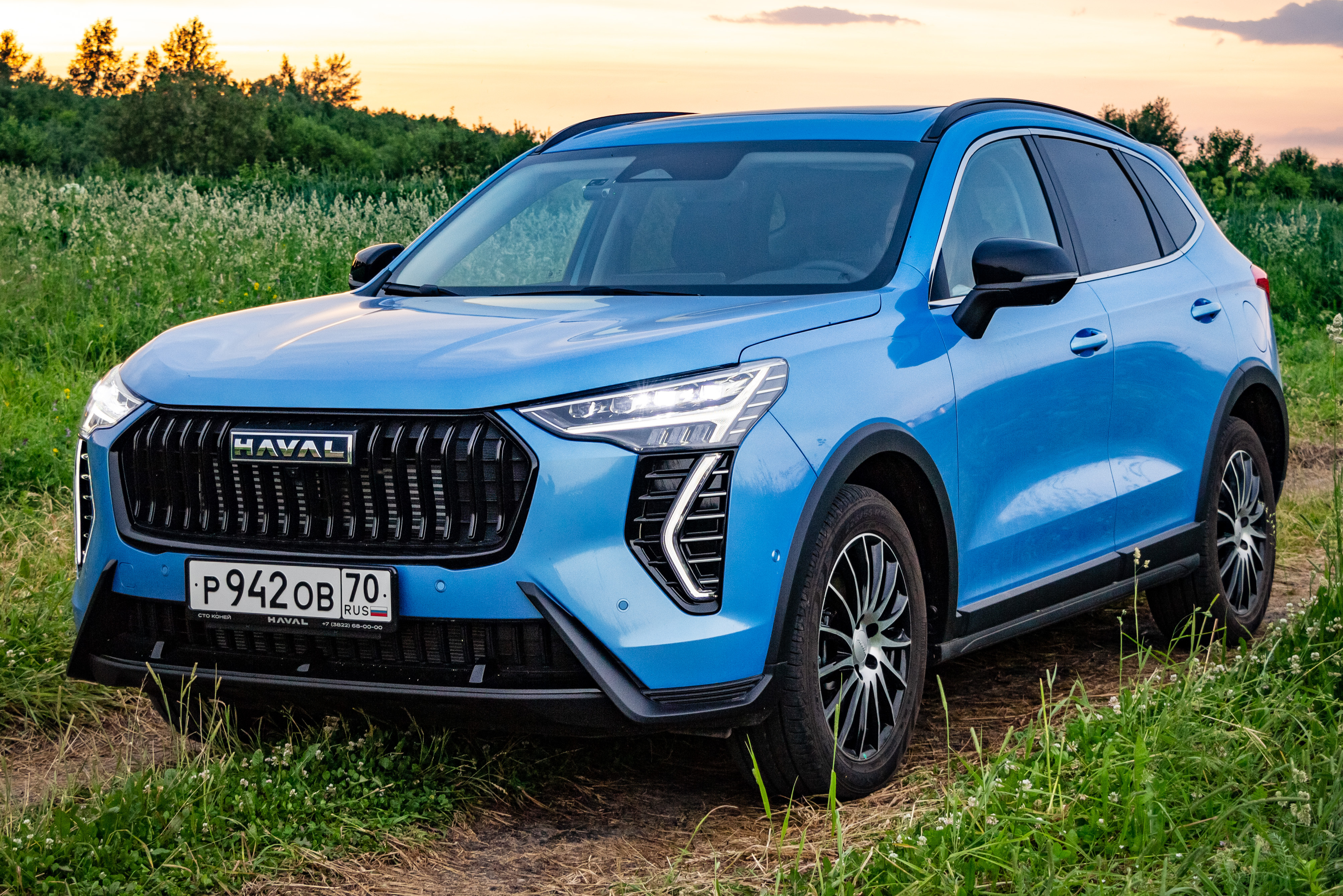
2024 facelift

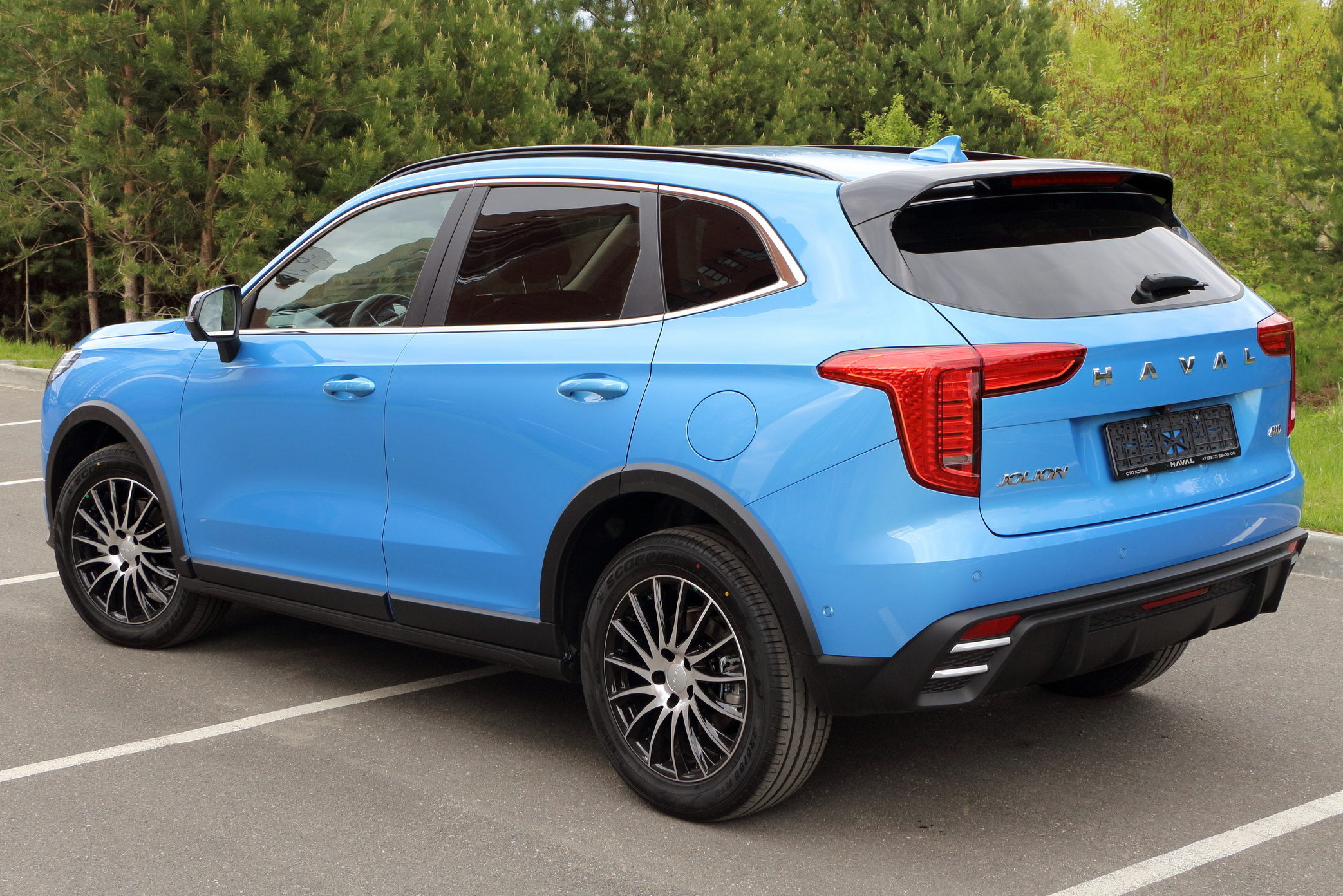
2024 facelift

== Powertrain ==
The Haval Jolion is powered by a 1.5-litre turbocharged petrol engine producing 105 kW (141 hp; 143 PS) and 210 N⋅m (150 lb⋅ft; 21 kg⋅m) of torque since the 2024 facelift. It previously produced 110 kW (150 hp; 150 PS) and 220 N⋅m (160 lb⋅ft; 22 kg⋅m) of torque The Jolion also has a 7-speed dual-clutch transmission and front-wheel drive.

== Jolion Hybrid ==
The Jolion Hybrid debuted in Thailand in November 2021. The front end design of the Haval Jolion Hybrid is different from the regular model, with changes made to the headlights, turn signals, front bumper, front grille and rear bumper. It is powered by a 1.5-litre GW4G15H engine and electric motor which has combined output of 140 kW (188 hp; 190 PS) and 375 N⋅m (277 lb⋅ft; 38 kg⋅m) paired to a DHT (Dedicated Hybrid Transmission).

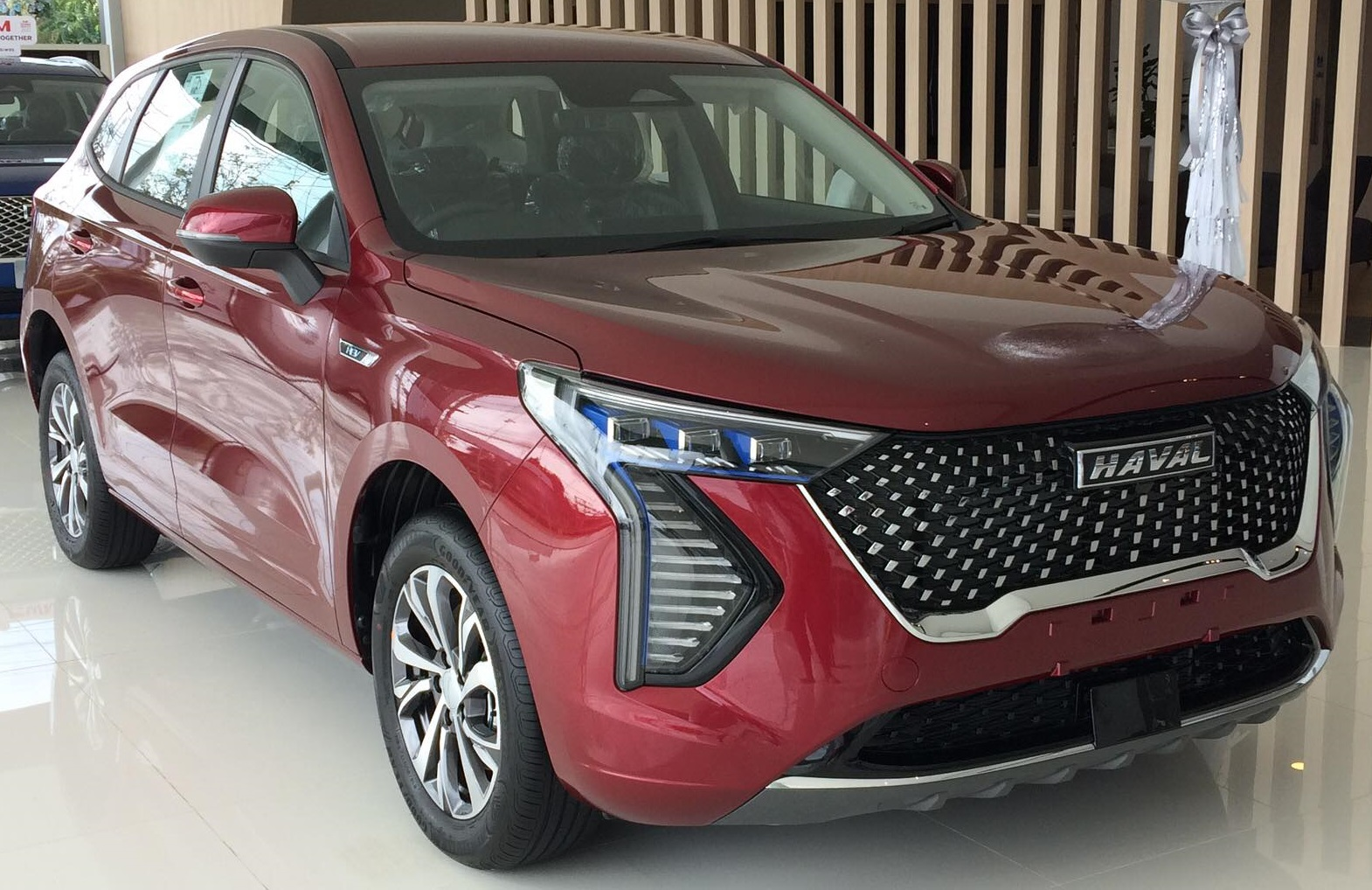
Jolion HEV (Thailand)

== Jolion Pro ==
In April 2024, GWM South Africa introduced the Haval Jolion Pro, which is the export version of the Haval Chitu. It slots in above the Jolion, and will replace the mid-spec Premium and Luxury Jolion trim levels. In June 2024, this model was introduced in Australia as a hybrid model, replacing the previous Jolion HEV. It retains the Jolion Pro badging, but GWM Australia will market it simply as the Jolion HEV to reduce confusion. Instead of using the dashboard design from the Chitu, the Jolion Pro shares the same dashboard with the Jolion. For the 2025 model year, GWM Australia introduced the petrol version of the Jolion Pro, marketed as the Jolion Ultra.

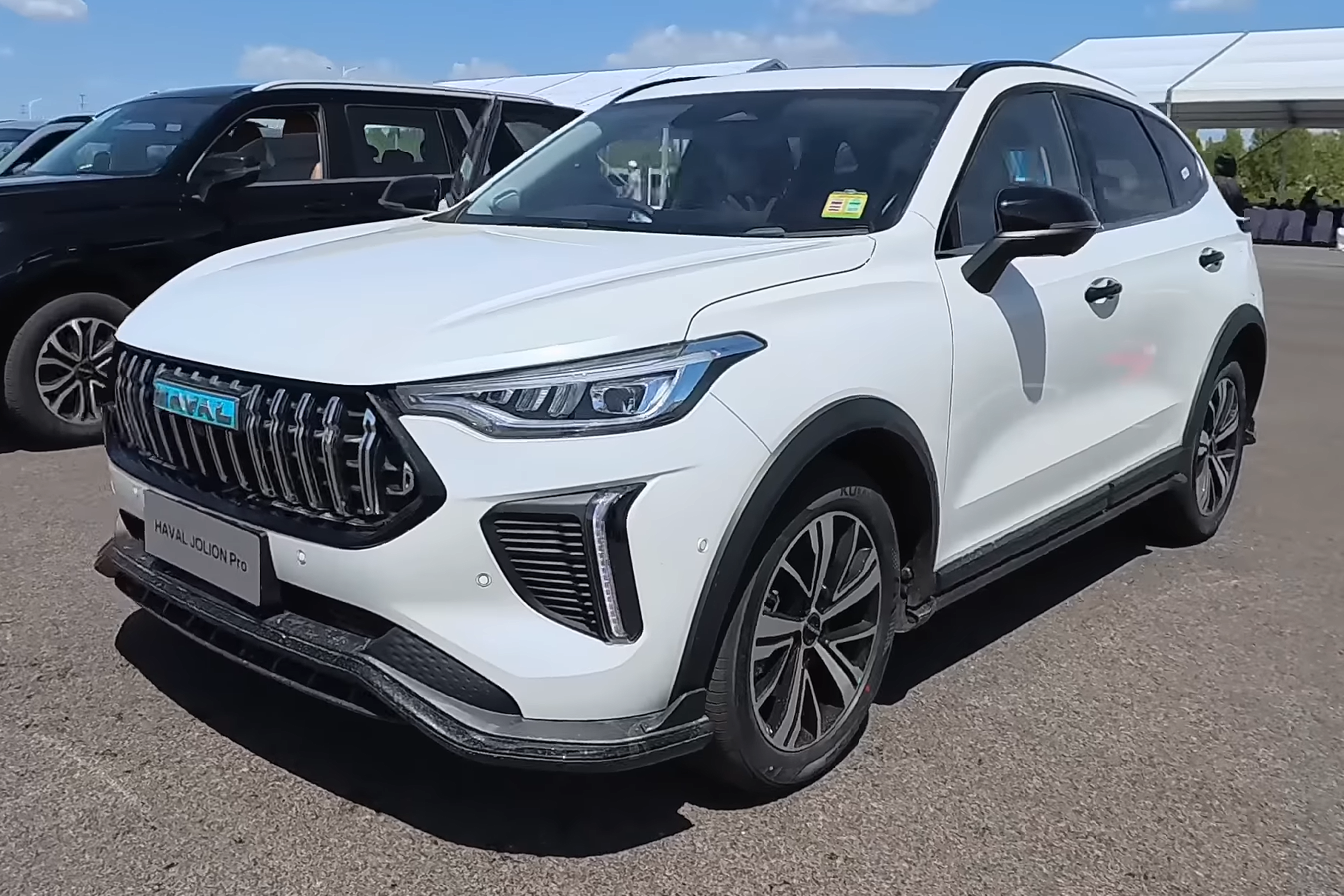
2024 Jolion Pro Hybrid

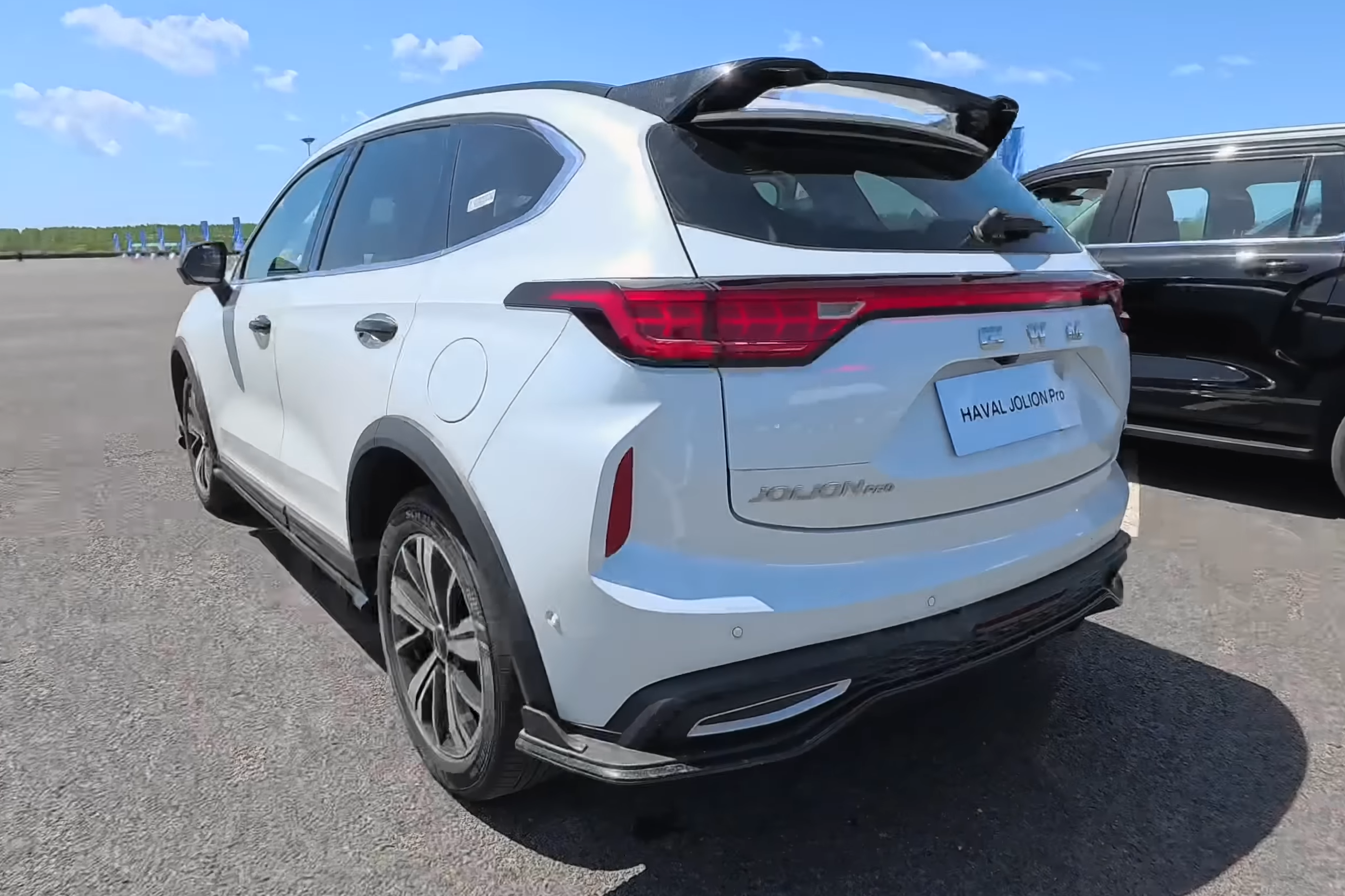
Rear view

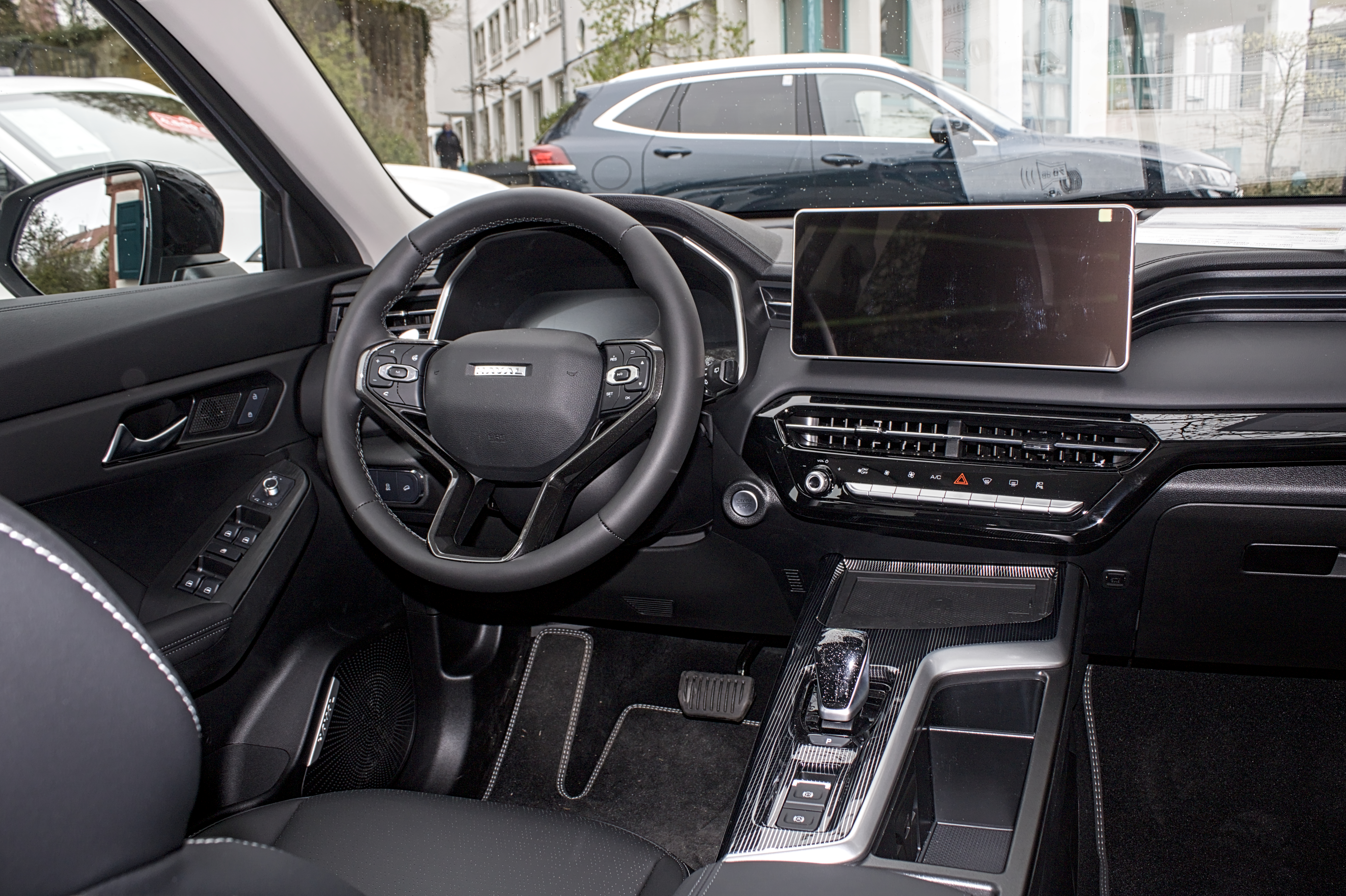
Interior

== Markets ==
=== Asia ===
==== Indonesia ====
The Jolion made its Indonesian debut on 17 July 2024 at the 31st Gaikindo Indonesia International Auto Show alongside the Tank 300, with deliveries commenced in October 2024. It comes in a sole variant and powered only with a 1.5-litre HEV petrol hybrid powertrain. The Ultra variant equipped with the Advanced Driver Assistance System (ADAS) safety package was added in February 2025.

==== Pakistan ====
The Jolion was launched as a fully imported model from China in Pakistan in 2021. The local assembly in Pakistan commenced later in May 2023. Initially, it was offered in only one trim powered by a 1.5-litre turbocharged petrol engine. It comes with 7-speed DCT. The hybrid variant of the Jolion was launched in March 2024, it is powered by a 1.5-litre HEV petrol hybrid powertrain.

==== Philippines ====
The Jolion was launched in the Philippines on 11 April 2023, as part of GWM's entry to the Philippines. The Jolion is available in three trim levels: Plus, Max and Supreme, powered by either turbocharged petrol or HEV powertrains.

==== Thailand ====
The Jolion was launched in Thailand on 25 November 2021, with three trim levels: Tech, Pro and Ultra, powered only with a 1.5-litre HEV petrol hybrid powertrain. The Sport trim was added to replace both the Tech and Pro trims in July 2023.

==== Vietnam ====
The Jolion went on sale in Vietnam on 11 March 2025, with two trim levels: Pro and Ultra, powered only with a 1.5-litre HEV petrol hybrid powertrain.

=== Australia ===
The Jolion was launched in Australia on 2 July 2021, with three trim levels: Premium, Lux and Ultra, it is powered by a 1.5-litre turbocharged petrol engine. The HEV powertrain was added based on the flagship Ultra trim in August 2022. A few months later, the Jolion HEV became available in a more affordable Lux trim. The sportier S trim was added in November 2022.

In June 2024, the HEV trims were replaced with a HEV model based on the Chitu, or alternatively the Jolion Pro in other markets. In November 2024, the Ultra petrol variant was reintroduced based on the Chitu model.

In October 2025, the Ultra variants were replaced with the Vanta variants and the non-hybrid variants became equipped with an automatic engine stop/start system to comply with the New Vehicle Efficiency Standard (NVES) regulations.

=== Europe ===
The Jolion Pro was released in Europe in December 2024, starting in the United Kingdom, as part of the introduction of the Haval brand to the European market and Great Wall Motors strategic shift to marketing combustion-engine and hybrid electric vehicles in the region. In Europe, it is available with three trim levels: Premium, Lux and Ultra, and it is only available with the 1.5-litre HEV petrol hybrid.

=== Mexico ===
The Jolion was launched in Mexico on 16 November 2023, being the second product from GWM to be introduced in Mexico. It is available in two trim levels: Premium and Luxury, both trims are powered by either turbocharged petrol or HEV powertrains.

=== South Africa ===
The Jolion was launched in South Africa on 21 April 2021, with four trim levels: City, Premium, Luxury and Super Luxury, it is powered only by a 1.5-litre turbocharged petrol engine paired to either a 6-speed manual or a 7-speed DCT. The flagship S trim was added and the HEV powertrain was added in January 2023.

In June 2024, the Jolion range was restructured into two models: City and Pro. The City is the standard model available in two trim levels: City and City Plus, it is powered only by a 1.5-litre turbocharged petrol engine paired to either a 6-speed manual or a 7-speed DCT. The Pro is the sportier model based on the Haval Chitu, available in four trim levels: Premium, Super Luxury, Ultra Luxury, and S Ultra Luxury, it is available with either a 1.5-litre turbocharged petrol or a 1.5-litre HEV petrol hybrid powertrains.

In February 2026, the Pro LTD variant based on the Super Luxury trim powered by a 1.5-litre turbocharged petrol engine was introduced as a limited edition variant.

== Safety ==
ANCAP test results GWM Haval Jolion (2022, aligned with Euro NCAP)
Test	Points	%
Overall:	5 /5 stars	
Adult occupant:	34.53	90%
Child occupant:	41.18	84%
Pedestrian:	35.05	64%
Safety assist:	14.87	92%

Global NCAP 2.5 test results (Africa) Haval Jolion (2026, similar to Latin NCAP 2019)
Test	Score	Stars
Adult occupant protection	30.33/34.00	2 /5 stars
Child occupant protection	31.52/49.00	3 /5 stars

== Sales ==
Year	China	Australia	South Africa	Thailand	Russia	Mexico	Pakistan	Total production
2021	27,934	4,069	5,417		9,877	—	600	69,590
2022	0	9,092	9,068	3,155	17,112	—	1,700	51,794
2023	0	11,252	8,064	3,203	58,229	53	1,100	98,269
2024	0	14,238	9,213	1,828	83,828	6,374	3,800	135,274
2025		19,143				7,113	6,000	
