= Haval H2 =

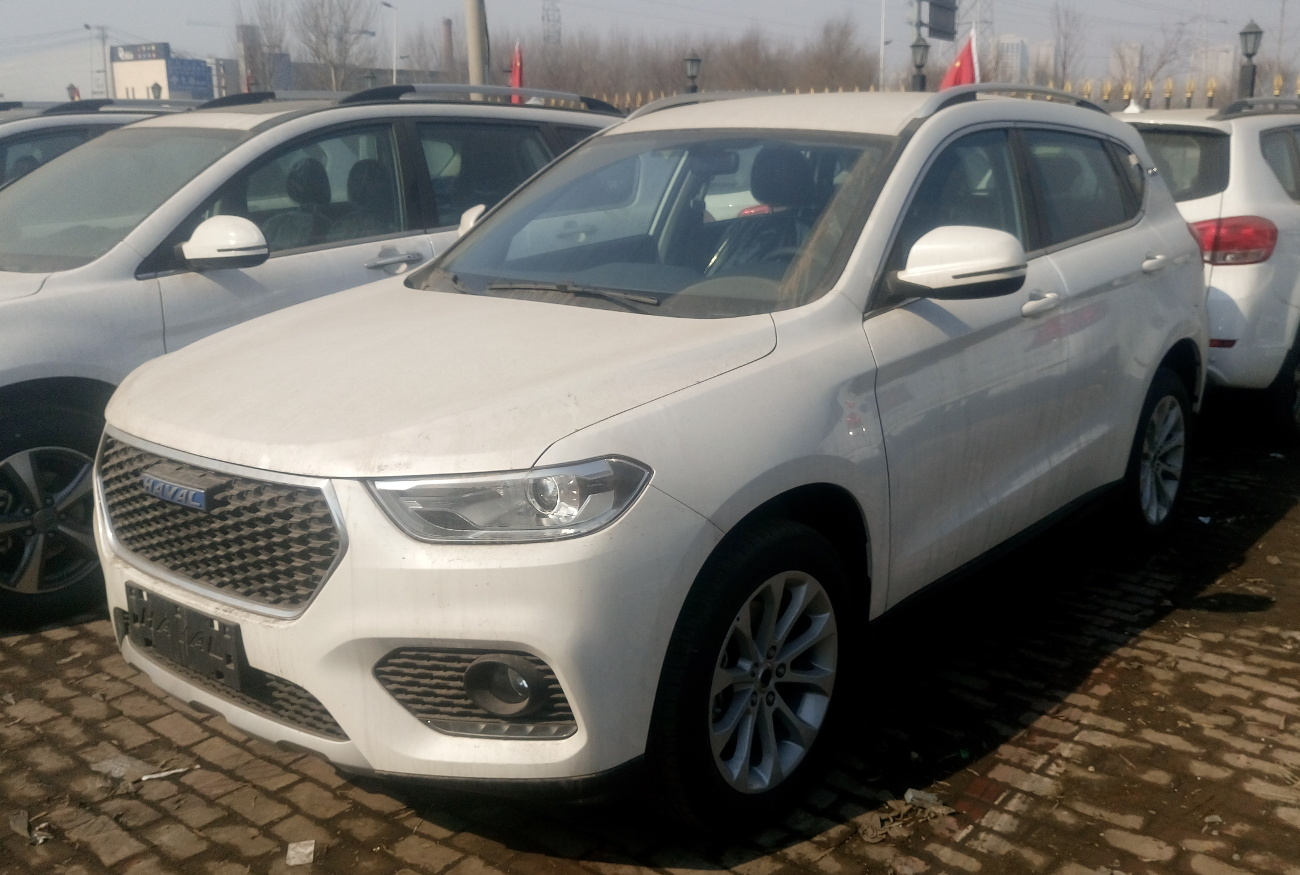

Overview
- Manufacturer: Haval (Great Wall Motor)
- Production: 2014–2021 (Red Label); 2016–2021 (Blue Label)
- Assembly: China

Body and chassis
- Class: Subcompact crossover SUV (B)
- Body style: 5-door SUV
- Layout: Front-engine, front-wheel-drive; Front-engine, four-wheel-drive

Powertrain
- Engine: Petrol: 1.5 L GW4G15B I4
- Transmission: 6-speed manual; 6-speed automatic; 7-speed dual-clutch

Dimensions
- Wheelbase: 2,560 mm (100.8 in)
- Length: 4,335 mm (170.7 in)
- Width: 1,814 mm (71.4 in)
- Height: 1,695 mm (66.7 in)

Chronology
- Successor: Haval Chitu; Haval Jolion

The Haval H2 is a subcompact crossover SUV produced by the Chinese manufacturer Great Wall Motor.

In China, the car was offered in two versions: "Blue Label" and "Red Label", which differed from each other in the design of the front end and interior. In addition to its home market in China, the model was sold in Malaysia and Iran, and in 2019, appeared in Italy. After being shown at the Moscow Motor Show, the model has been sold in Russia since 2015, In five years of presence on the market, it has found only 2,700 buyers. In 2021, the company's model range was replaced by the Haval Jolion compact crossover.

The engine is a 1.5-liter, turbocharged, 4-cylinder petrol engine with 110 kW (148 hp) and 210 N⋅m (155 lb⋅ft) of torque.

== Overview ==
The Haval H2 Red Label debuted at the 2014 Beijing Auto Show. Despite having a Red Haval badge, the crossover was launched before the Red and Blue label market strategy. The Haval H2 Blue Label was revealed later at the 2016 Chengdu Auto Show, making the H2 the first Haval to be sold with both red and blue labels. While being priced similarly and having the same powertrain and performance, Red Label cars usually feature more conservative styling and Blue Label cars feature more aggressive styling and is aimed at younger markets.

The Haval H2 is powered by a turbocharged, 1.5-liter four-cylinder petrol engine producing 110 kW (148 hp) and 210 N⋅m (150 lb⋅ft) of torque and mated to a six-speed automatic transmission.

In 2017, ANCAP tested the Haval H2 in its Australasian configuration which received the maximum safety ranking, five stars.

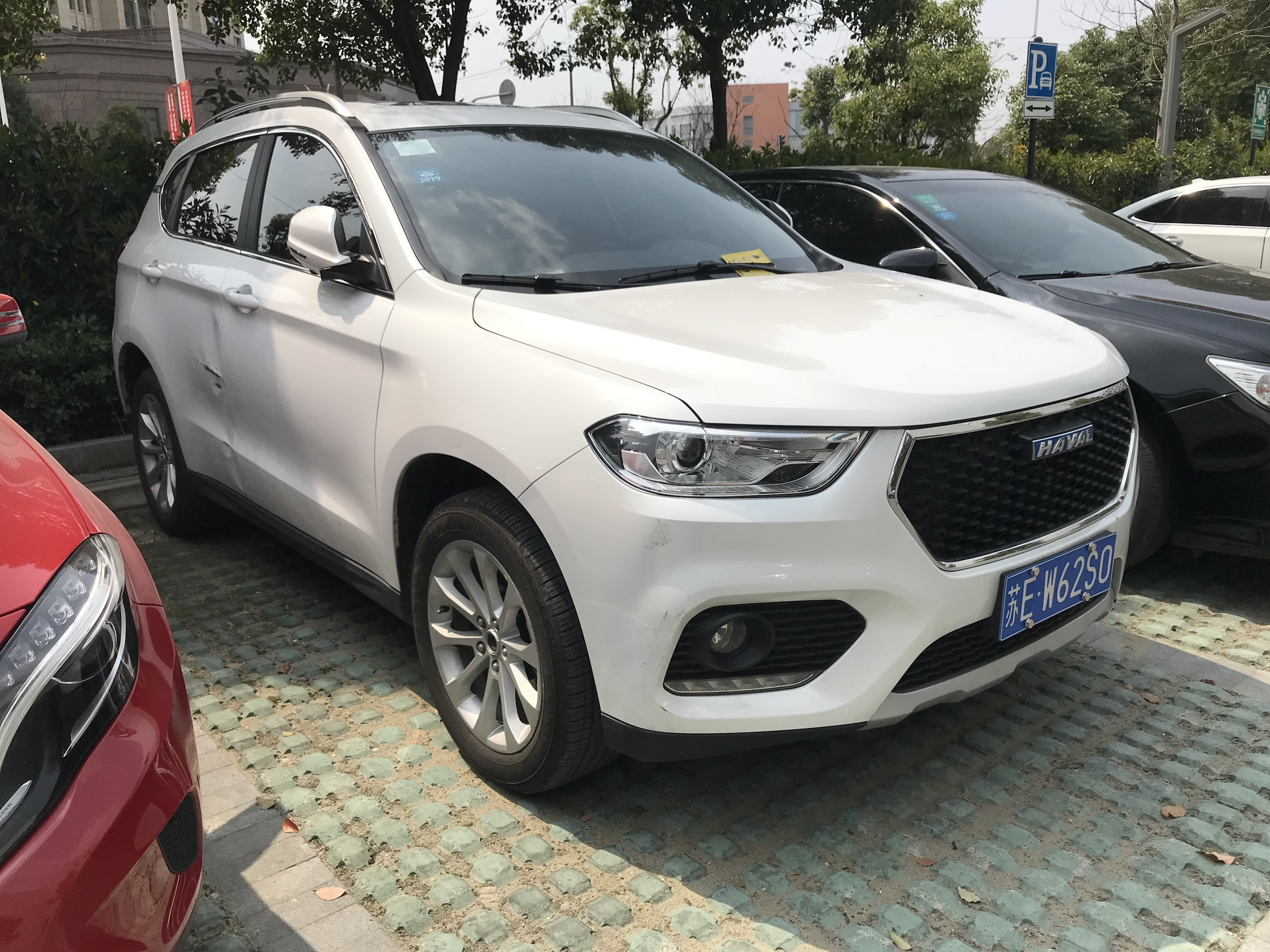
Haval H2 Blue Label front.

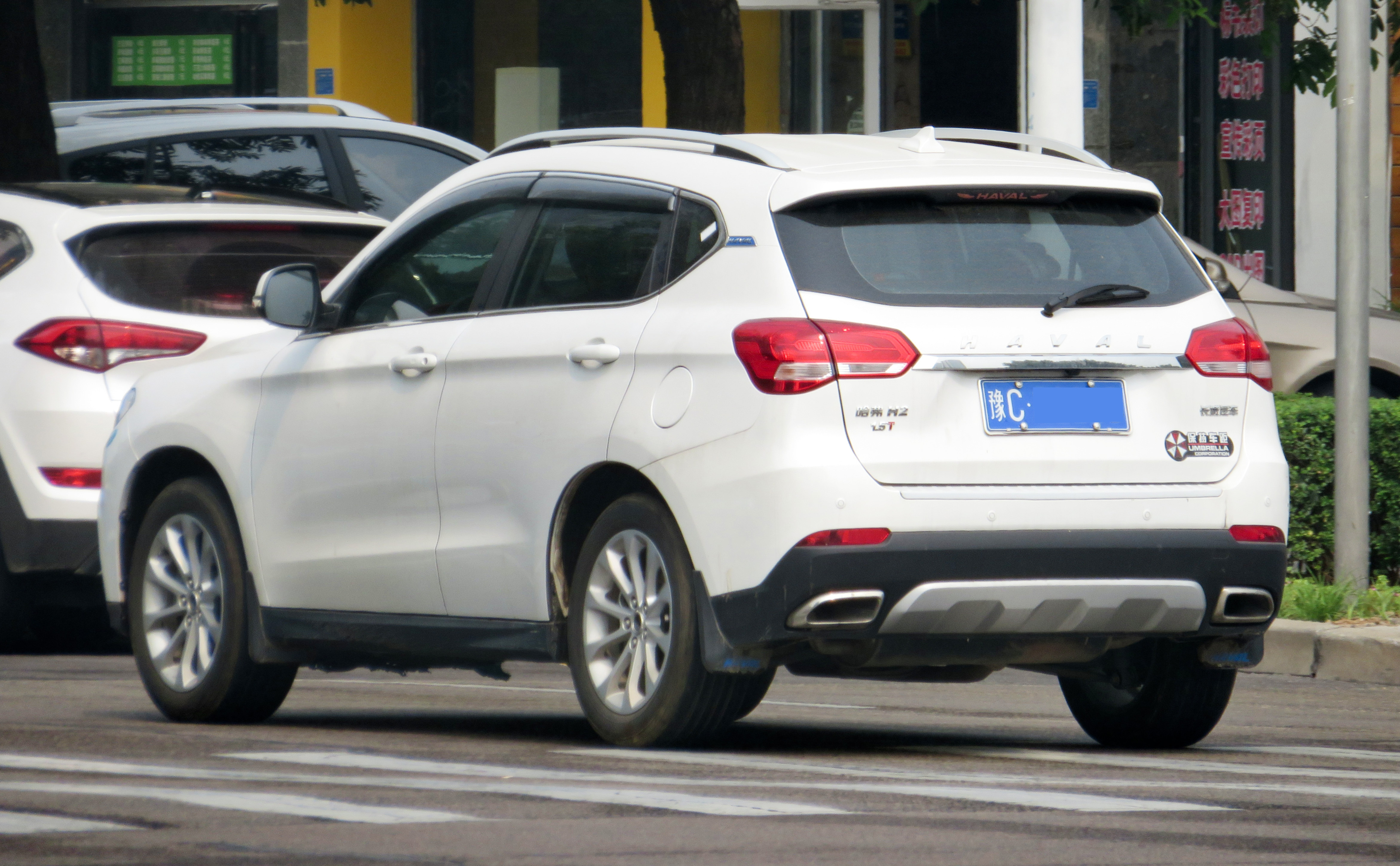
Haval H2 Blue Label rear.

=== Safety ===
ANCAP test results* GWM Haval H2 (2017)
Test	Score
Overall	5 /5 stars
Frontal offset	13.88/16
Side impact	16/16
Pole	2/2
Seat belt reminders	0/3
Whiplash protection	Good
Pedestrian protection	Adequate
Electronic stability control	Standard

== Overseas markets ==
=== Malaysia ===
The Haval H2 was launched in Malaysia in May 2016 with three variants available: Standard, Comfort and Premium. The Standard could only be had with a six-speed manual gearbox while the Comfort and Premium variants could only be had with a six-speed automatic unit. Early models were fully imported from China with locally assembled models officially available as of September 2016. Only two locally assembled models were available: Comfort and Premium.

=== Iran ===
The Haval H2 was presented in the 2017 Tehran Automotive Show in Iran by Bahman Group, the builder of the car in Iran.

=== Europe ===
In June 2019, Great Wall start the export in Italy of the H2 Red Label with 1.6 Turbo 146 HP petrol or biofuel LPG homologated Euro 6D-Temp.

=== Australia ===
The Haval H2 was released in Australia under Great Wall (not imported by Ateco) in 2014 only in front wheel drive and the 1.5-litre turbo engine derived from Mitsubishi. It was release alongside other Haval SUVs of various sizes such as the H6, H8 and H9. The model was discontinued in 2021 and replaced by the Jolion along with the H6 update.

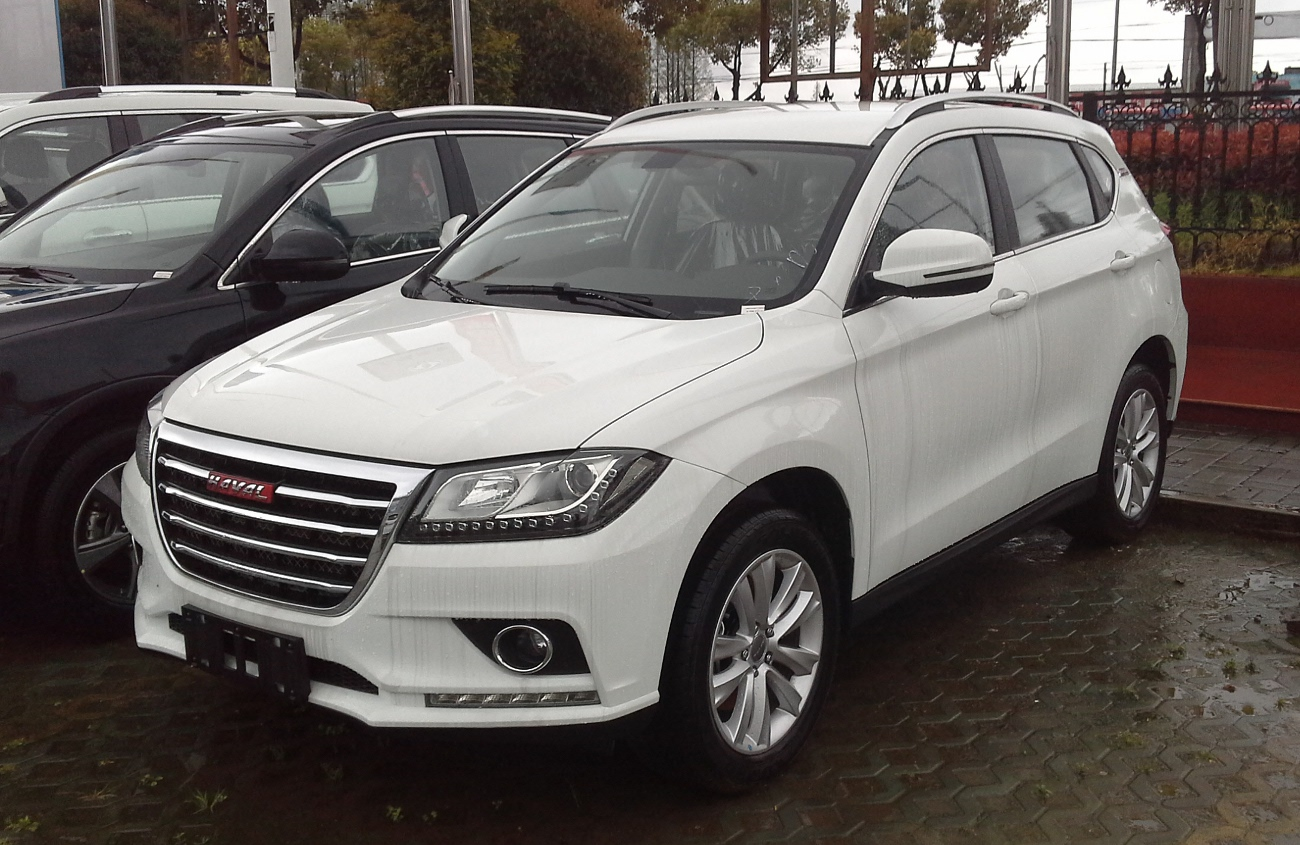
Haval H2 Red Label.

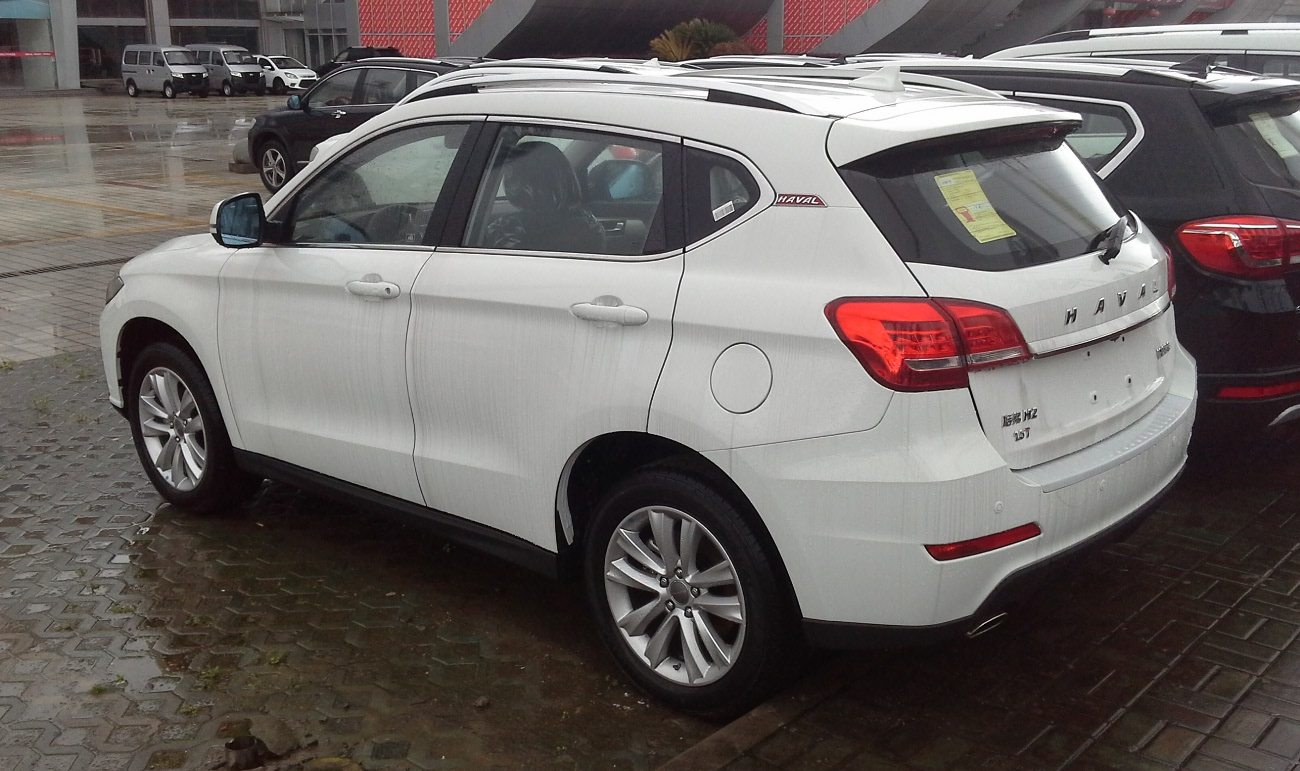
Haval H2 Red Label rear.
