= Hii King Chiong =

Malaysian businessman (born 1957)

- Born: 30 November 1957 (age 68); Sibu, Sarawak, Malaysia
- Occupation: Businessman
- Known for: Philanthropist
- Political party: Sarawak United Peoples' Party (SUPP) part of Barisan Nasional
- Website: www.hiikingchiong.com

Hii King Chiong (simplified Chinese: 许庆璋; traditional Chinese: 許慶璋; pinyin: Xǔ Qìng Zhāng; Jyutping: Heoi2 Hing3 Zoeng1; Pe̍h-ōe-jī: Khó͘ Khèng-chiong; born 30 November 1957 in Sibu, Sarawak, Malaysia) is a businessman and philanthropist. In recognition of his meritorious philanthropic activities and contributions to the State of Sarawak, government, and the people, he was conferred with Ahli Bintang Sarawak (A.B.S.) – Member of the Order of the Star of Sarawak by The Governor of Sarawak.

== Early life and education ==
Hii King Chiong is a Malaysian Chinese and of Foochow descent. He is married with Madam Ting Hua Eng with whom they had a son and a daughter. His father, YBhg. Datuk Hii Yii Peng who is a businessman in Sibu, always teach him the importance of contributing back to the society once successful. This has become his main life perspective. He was educated at Methodist Primary School and Sacred Heart Secondary School in Sibu. Upon his high school graduation, he took GCE 'O' Level at St. Patrick's Secondary School, Singapore, followed by GCE 'A' Level at Acton Technical College, London, United Kingdom. King Chiong graduated with Diploma in Business Studies, from University of Wolverhampton, England, UK. He further study to deepen his business knowledge, and obtained a Master of Business Administration.

Following his return to Sarawak, he applies what he learned from his university to expand the family business, into another stage of success.

== Political career ==
He joined Sarawak United Peoples' Party (SUPP), Sibu Branch in 2006. He supports the party continuously by helping to campaign and making financial contributions. Hii served on the SUPP Piasau Branch Committee and as the Pro Tem chairman from 2012 to 2014. Hii's success in his political career is based largely on his accessibility to the community in Miri.

In 2016 he filed an election petition in Pujut, claiming that opposing candidate, Dr Ting Tiong Choon was ineligible to run in the election as he had dual citizenship. Despite this, Hii lost the election, but regularly campaigns on behalf of BN candidates in the region.

== Offices Commitment ==
Hii King Chiong has over numerous years, involved himself in different responsible capacities in various social bodies, including but not limited to schools, social associations, and so forth. He set-ups two service centres in Miri, recruited volunteers and has since solved many problems faced by the Miri Society.

Hii's philanthropy is focused on Chinese education, he works together with associations to negotiate the best for Chinese education and hoped that one day it would have the kind of recognition enjoyed by government schools. The association board of management continues to bear heavy financial constraints to solve problems, such as old and dilapidated wooden building. He however, upon losing in the Sarawak State Election 2016 for the seat of Pujut, refused to concede although losing by wide margin and challenged the results which was rejected by election court. He appealed to the Federal Court, hoping the court would declare him as winner by disqualifying Dr Ting Tiong Choon of DAP on dual citizenship technicalities.

The below shows some known offices held under the nomination by the associations.

1. Hii & Chin Service Centre – Advisor 2012
2. East Malaysia United Hawkers Association – Advisor 2012
3. Sarawak United Association of Chinese Primary Aided Schools Miri and Limbang Division. – Advisor 2012
4. Miri Foochow Association – Chairman 2007–2011; Deputy chairman 2011–2012.
5. Sarawak Chinese Education Consultative Committee – Member 2012
6. Miri Division Koh Yang Xu Clan Association – Chairman 2008–2012; Honorary Advisor 2012–2013
7. Miri Badminton Association – Honorary Advisor 2011
8. Miri Chinese Calligraphy & Cultural Society – Honorary Advisor 2011
9. Miri Chinese Association – Life Advisor – 2011
10. Che Sing Khor Moral Uplifting Society – Advisor 2009
11. Riam Road Secondary School, Miri – Honorary chairman 2006
12. SMK Sacret Heart, Sibu – Board of Management committee member 2005
13. SMK St. Elizabeth, Sibu – Board of Management committee member 2005
