= Haval Big Dog =

Chinese compact SUV

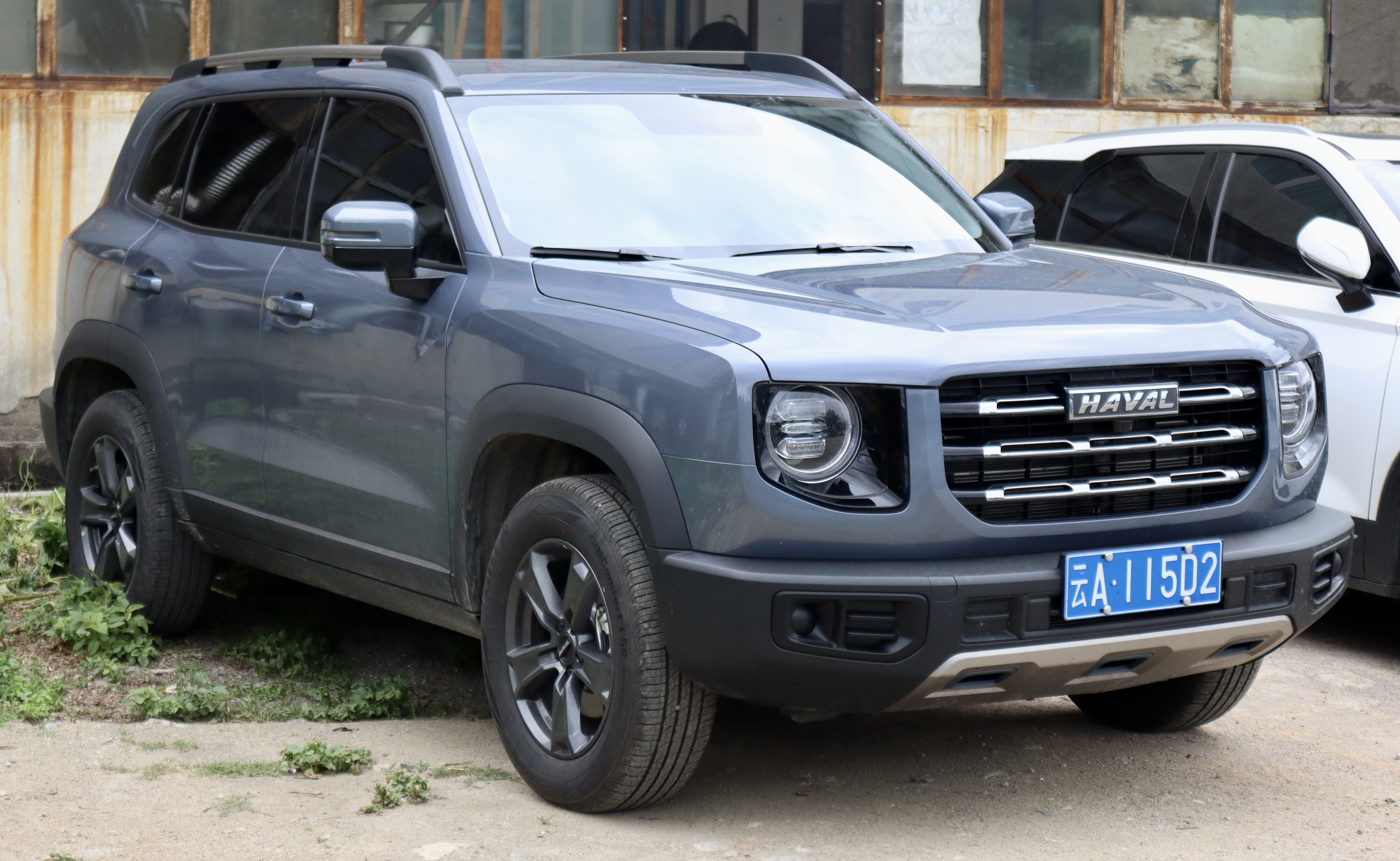
- Haval Big Dog (first generation)

Overview
- Manufacturer: Great Wall Motor
- Production: 2020–present

Body and chassis
- Class: Compact crossover SUV
- Body style: 5-door SUV
- Layout: Front-engine, front-wheel-drive Front-engine, four-wheel-drive
- Chassis: Unibody

The Haval Big Dog (Chinese: 哈弗大狗; pinyin: Hāfú Dàgǒu), or Haval Dargo in export markets, is a compact crossover SUV produced by the Chinese manufacturer Great Wall Motor under the Haval brand since 2020.

Its Chinese-language name "大狗" (Dàgǒu), meaning "Big Dog", was chosen in an online poll written out by Haval. The body colours and trim levels are also named after dog breeds, starting from the entry 'Husky' trim level up to the top 'Belgian Shepherd' trim.

In 2023, a larger version named the Haval Second Generation Big Dog, or Haval H7 in export markets, was introduced to be sold alongside the standard Big Dog.

== First generation (2020) ==
First generation
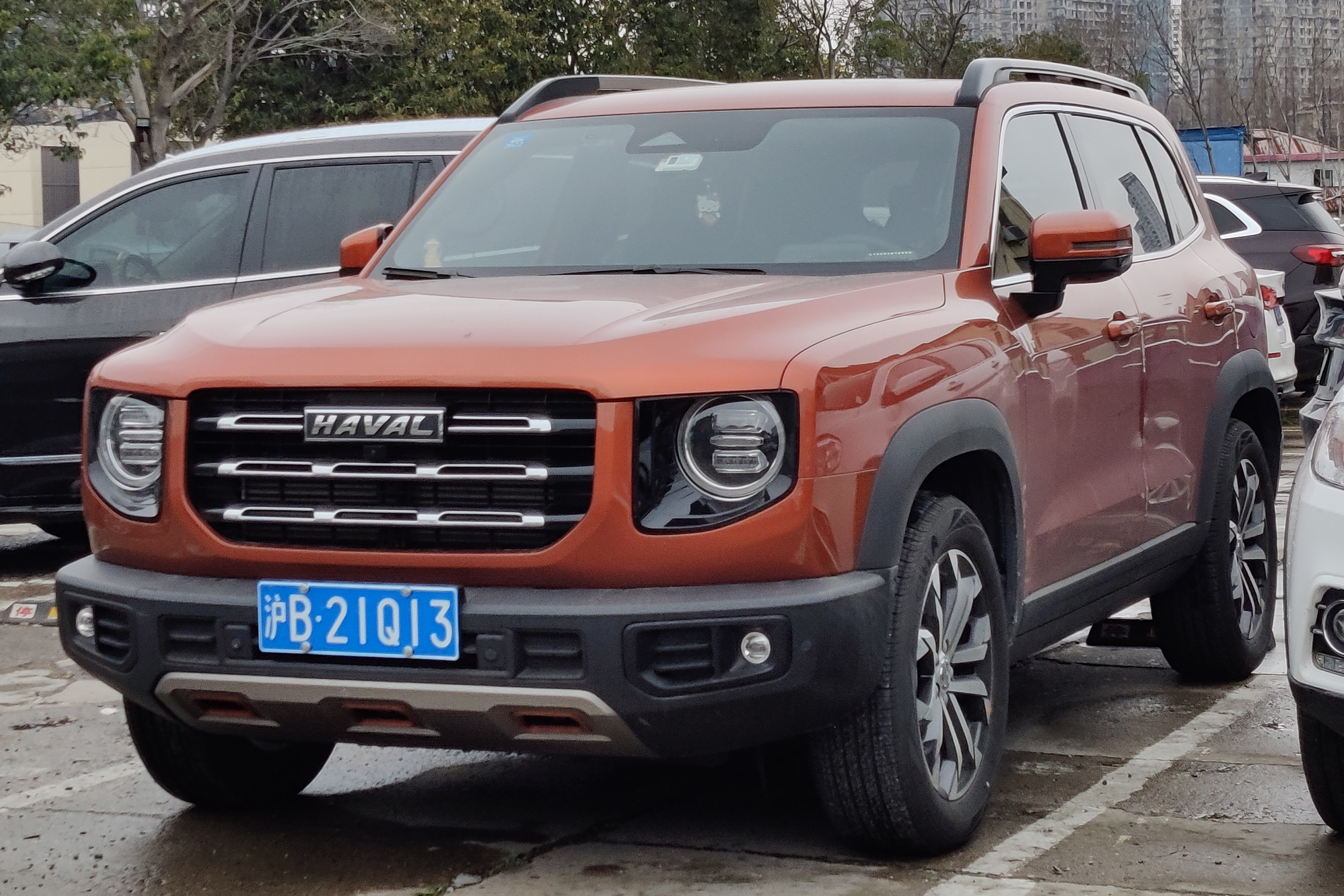

Overview
- Also called: Haval Dargo
- Production: 2020–present
- Assembly: China: Tianjin (Great Wall Motor Co., Ltd. Tianjin Branch); Russia: Tula (Haval Motor Rus, LLC)
- Designer: Phil Simmons

Body and chassis
- Platform: L.E.M.O.N. platform (B30)

Powertrain
- Engine: Petrol: 1.5 L GW4B15A I4 turbo; 2.0 L GW4N20 I4 turbo
- Transmission: 7-speed DCT

Dimensions
- Wheelbase: 2,738 mm (107.8 in)
- Length: 4,620 mm (181.9 in)
- Width: 1,890 mm (74.4 in)
- Height: 1,780 mm (70.1 in)

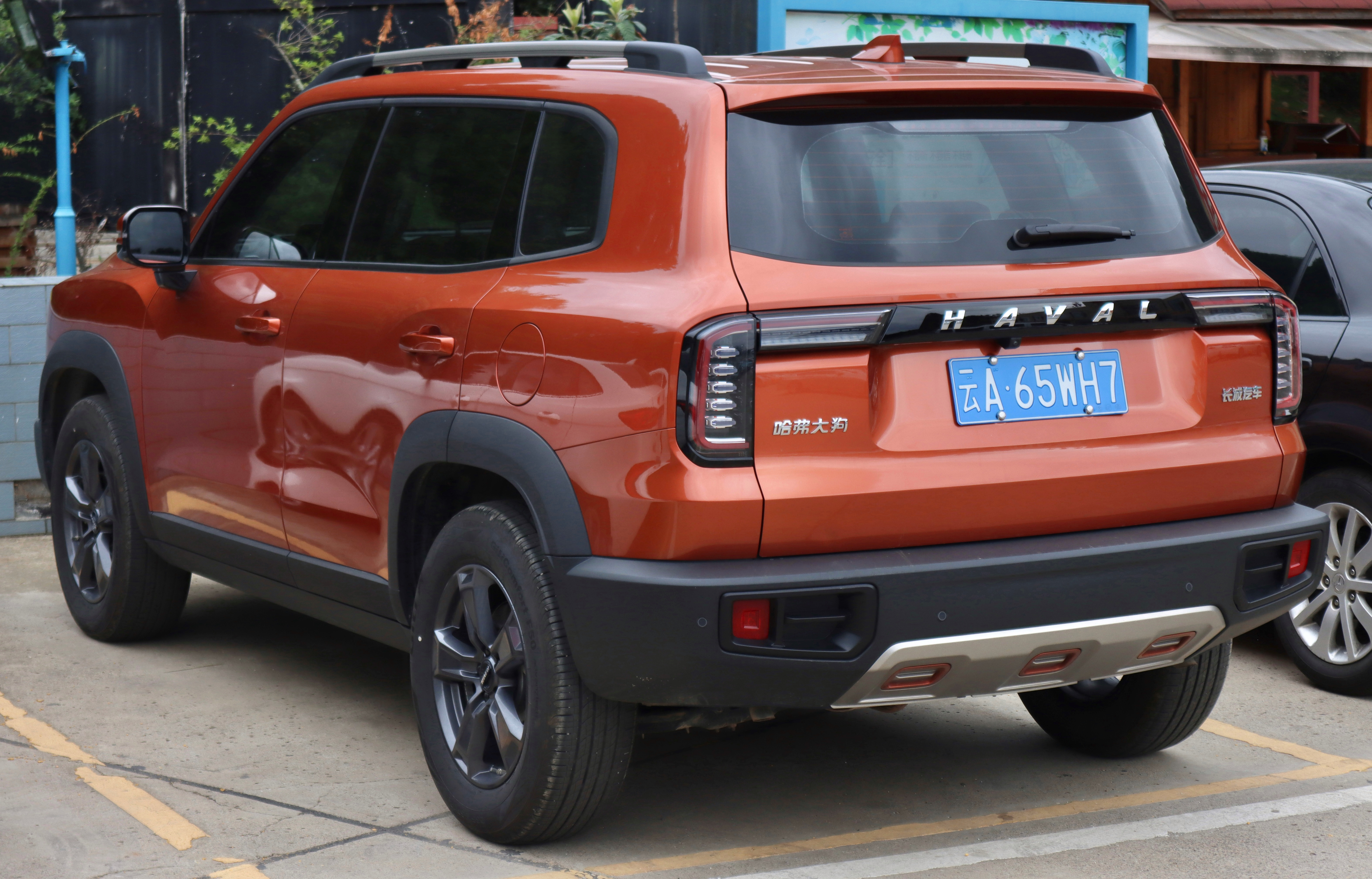
Rear view

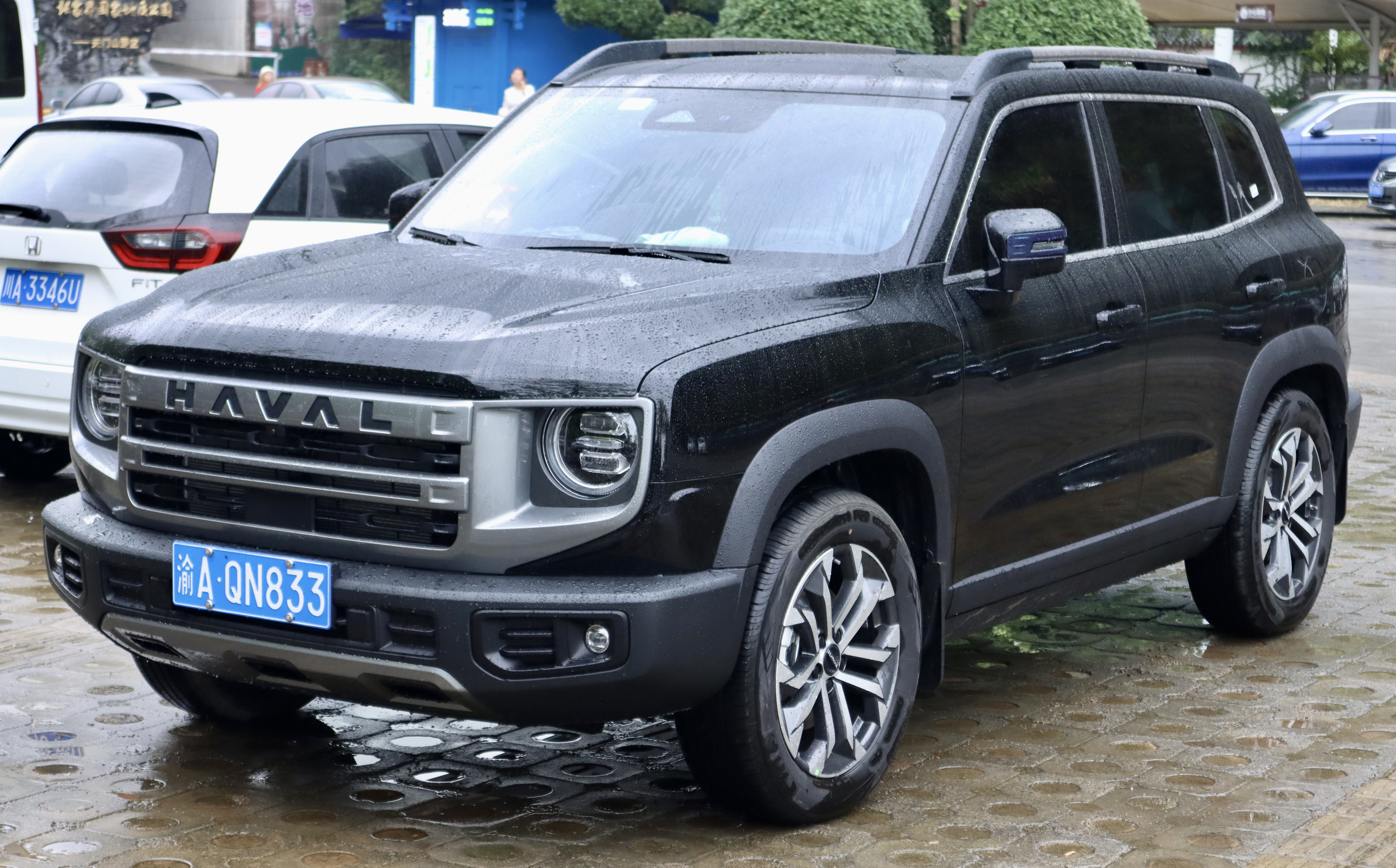
Facelift model

The Haval Big Dog was unveiled at the 2020 Chengdu Auto Show, offered with both front-wheel-drive and four-wheel-drive drivetrain. Despite the Big Dog being the successor of the Haval H5, the Big Dog is a crossover SUV built on the unibody L.E.M.O.N. platform shared with the third generation Haval H6 and Haval Jolion instead of the older Haval H5's body-on-frame platform. The Big Dog uses a transversely mounted engine, and it uses MacPherson suspension for the front axle and multi-link suspension for the rear axle.

In terms of engine and power, the Haval Big Dog is powered either by a 1.5-litre turbocharged engine code-named GW4B15A producing 169 hp (126 kW; 171 PS) and 285 N⋅m (210 lb⋅ft; 29.1 kg⋅m) of torque, or a 2.0-litre turbocharged engine code-named GW4N20 producing 211 hp (157 kW; 214 PS) and 325 N⋅m (240 lb⋅ft; 33.1 kg⋅m) of torque. The former is only offered in front-wheel-drive, while the latter is only offered in four-wheel-drive. The Big Dog also offers a variety of driving modes and off-road specifications and features such as two differential locks, tank U-turn, and Computer-controlled four-wheel drive.

The Big Dog is available with a choice of six exterior colours: Orange, Red, Grey, Green, Black and White; and three rim packages: Five spoke star 19 inch, Double five spoke wind turbine 18 inch and Five spoke drill 18 inch. Four interior options are also available: Black, Blue-Green, Rice-Brown and Black-Orange.

=== Big Dog Hunting Edition ===
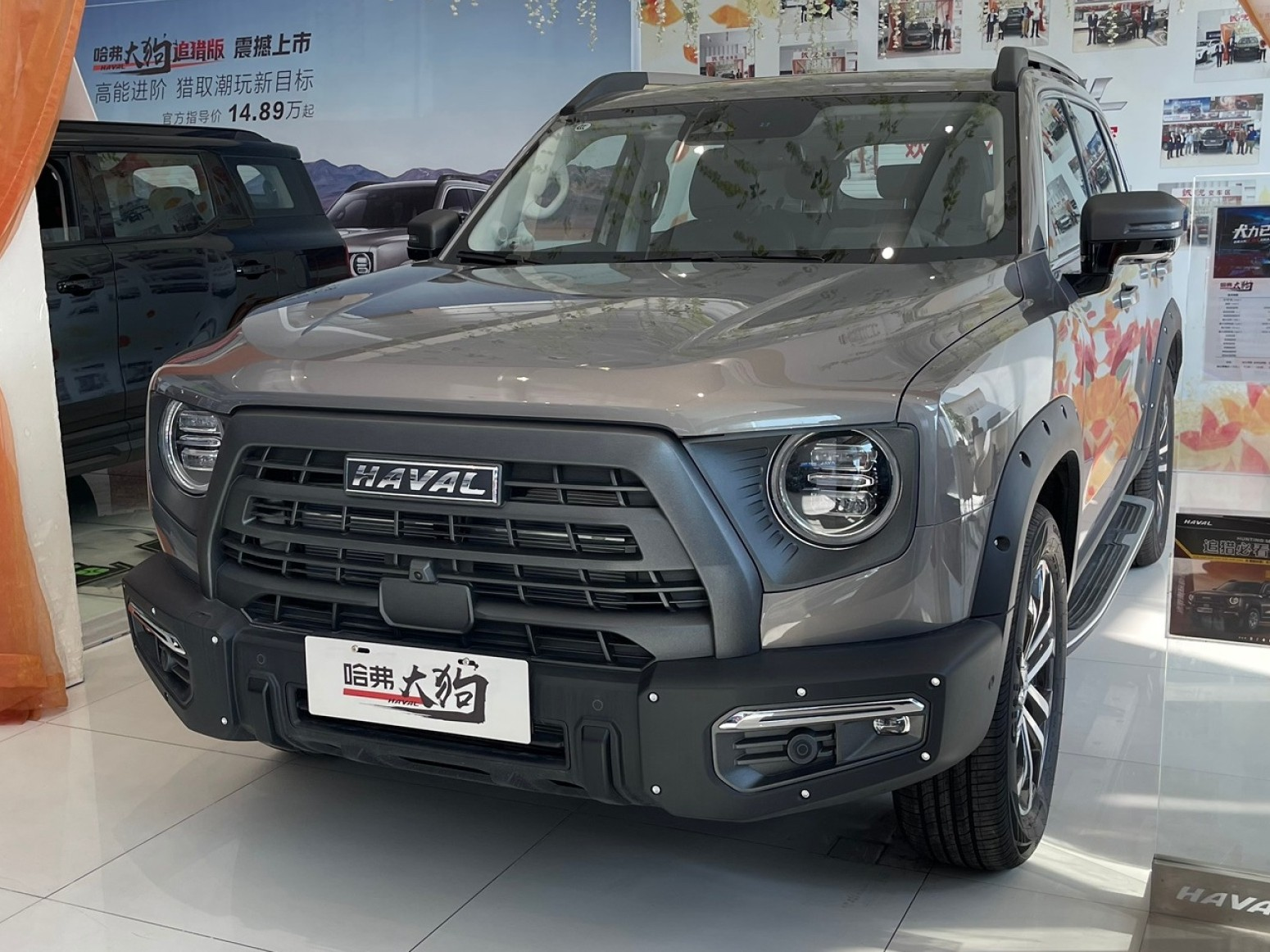
Haval Big Dog Hunting Edition

In 2022, the company announced the new Big Dog Hunting Edition. The Hunting Edition features a more rugged appearance with redesigned bumpers, a restyled grille, larger wheels, running boards, and extra wide wheel arch extensions with exposed bolts.

=== Markets ===
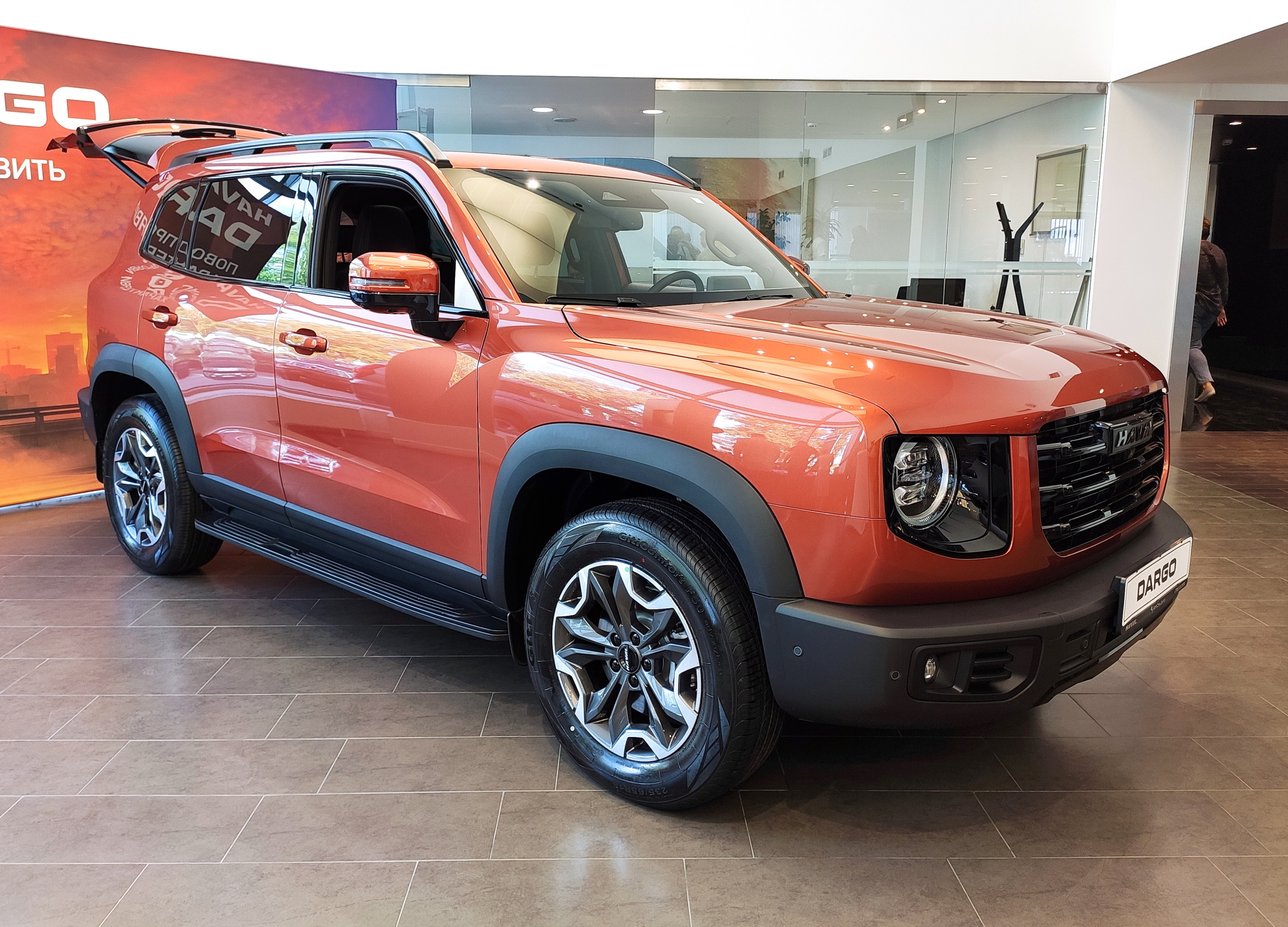
Haval Dargo (Russia)

The Haval Dargo is the name for the Big Dog for overseas markets.

==== Saudi Arabia ====
The Dargo is available in two trims, Sport and Adventure, it is powered by a 2.0-litre 4-cylinder engine.

== Second generation (2023) ==
Second generation
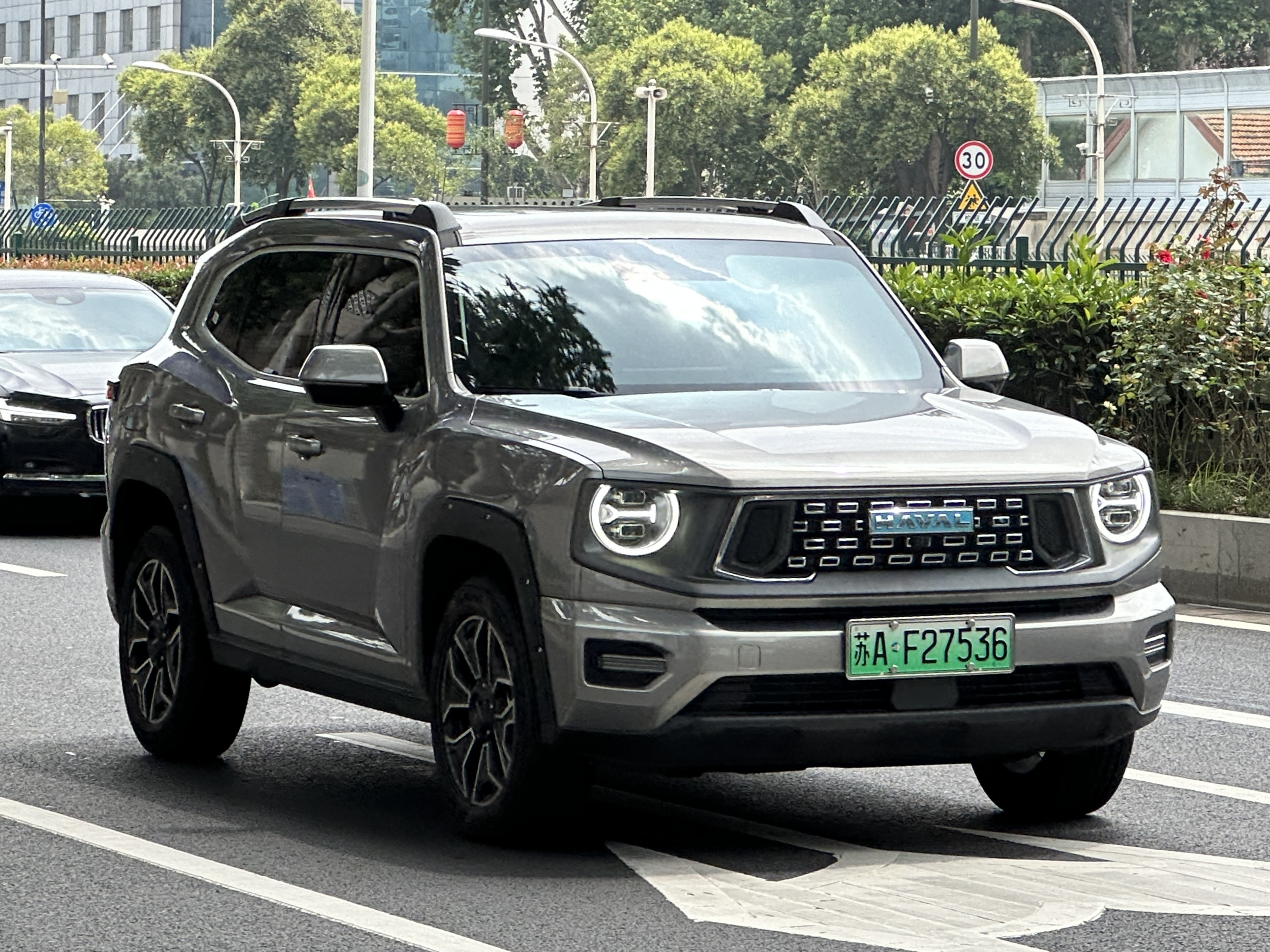

Overview
- Also called: Haval H-Dog; Haval Dargo X; Haval H7 (Australia, South Affrica); Haval Big Dog Plus (China, 2025–present)
- Production: 2023–present
- Assembly: China: Tianjin (Great Wall Motor Co., Ltd. Tianjin Branch); Russia: Tula (Haval Motor Rus, LLC)

Body and chassis
- Platform: L.E.M.O.N. platform (B30)
- Related: Haval Cool Dog

Powertrain
- Engine: Petrol: 1.5 L GW4B15A I4 turbo (HEV); 2.0 L GW4N20 I4 turbo
- Transmission: 9-speed DCT; 2-speed DHT (HEV)

Dimensions
- Wheelbase: 2,810 mm (110.6 in)
- Length: 4,705 mm (185.2 in)
- Width: 1,908 mm (75.1 in)
- Height: 1,780 mm (70.1 in)

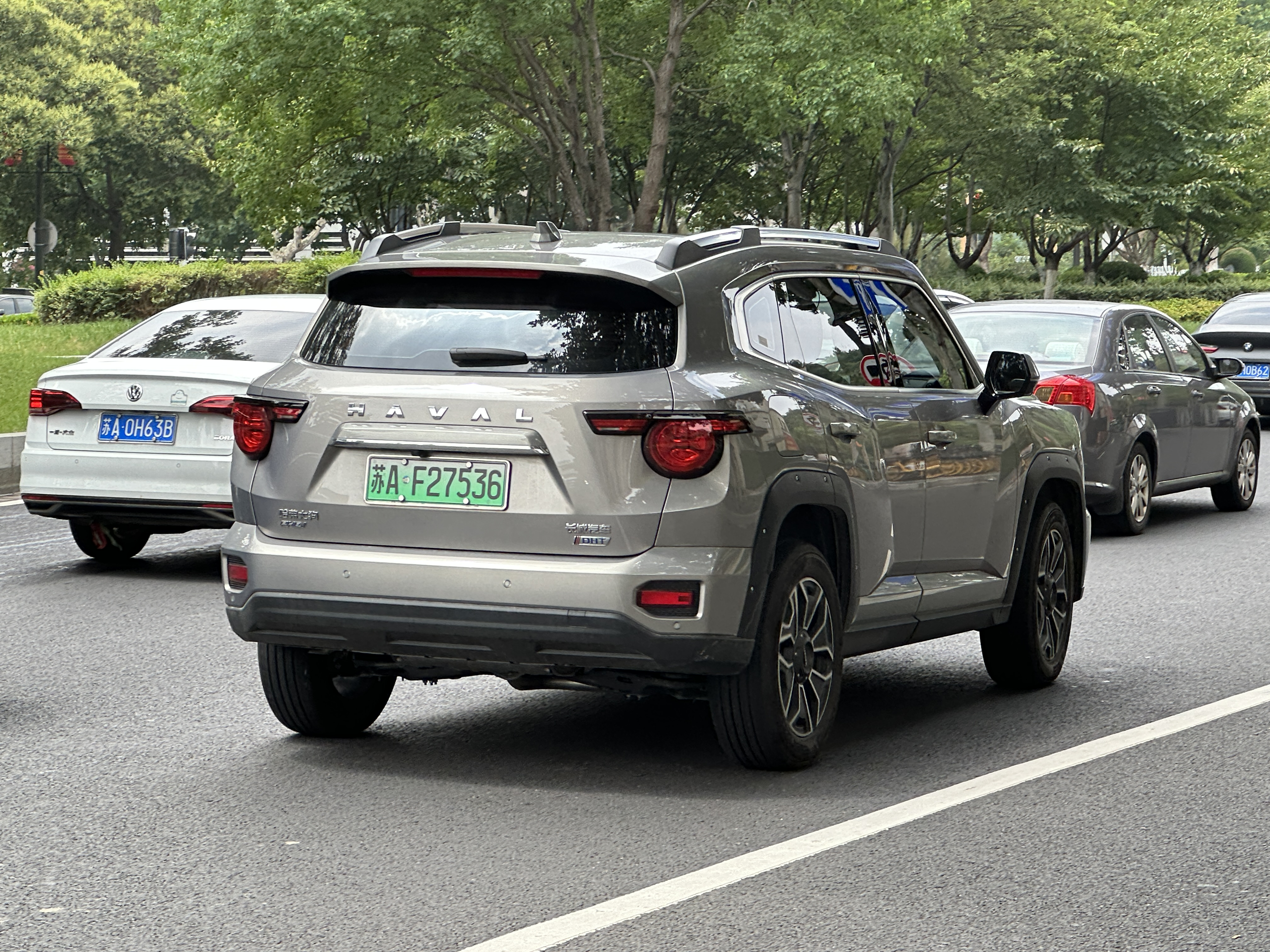
Rear view

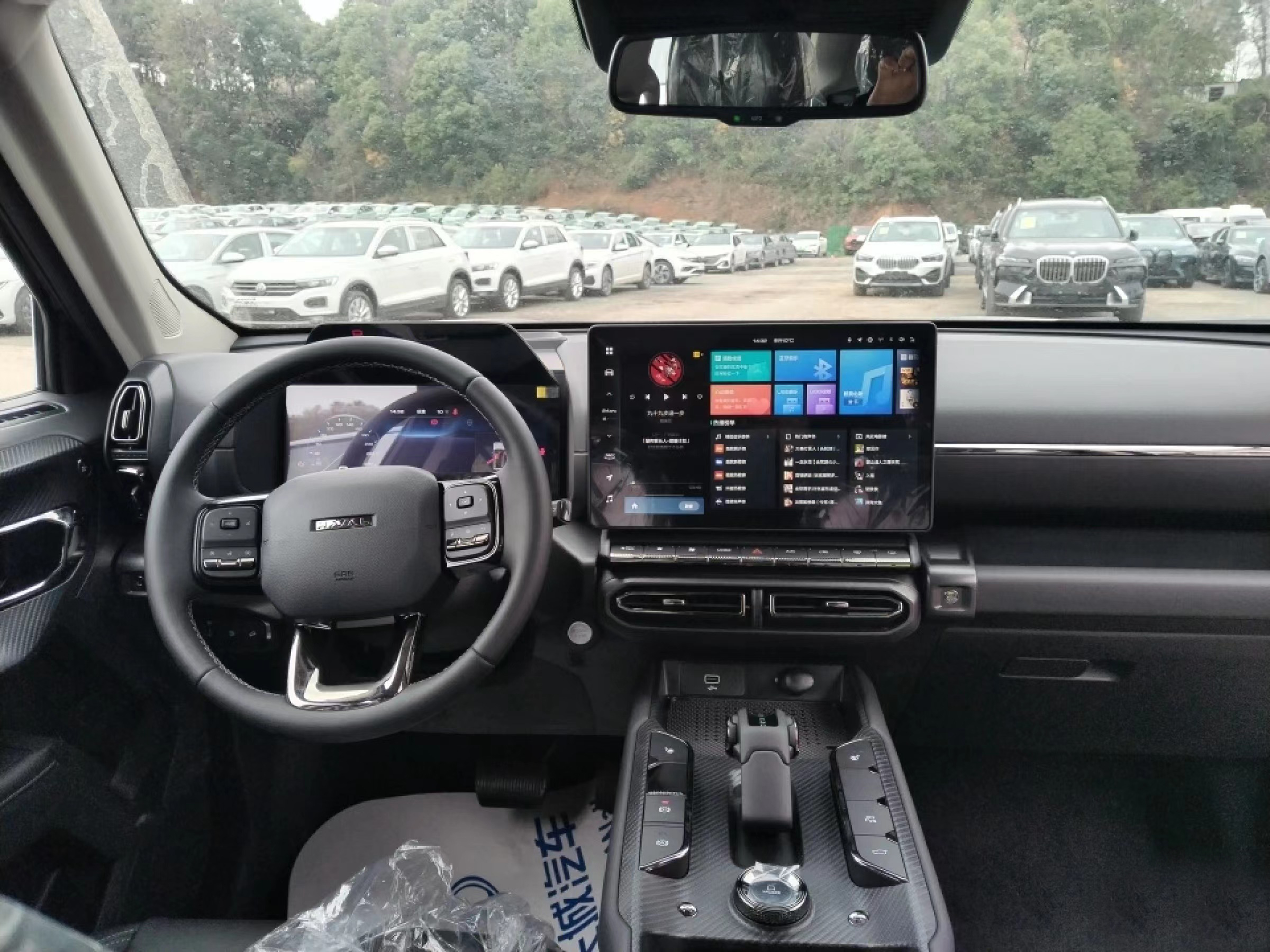
Interior

The Second Generation Big Dog was originally previewed as the Haval H-Dog PHEV at the 2022 Guangzhou Auto Show that opened on 30 December 2022, and is available in both PHEV and petrol versions. The Second Generation Big Dog is a larger and more expensive vehicle compared to the Big Dog, which will continue to be sold alongside the Second Generation Big Dog.

The interior sports a symmetrical design with a full LCD instrument panel and a central control screen.

=== Powertrain ===
The second-generation Haval Big Dog PHEV uses a 1.5-litre turbocharged four-cylinder engine paired with a 2-speed DHT powertrain that outputs a combined 240 kW (326 PS; 322 hp) and 530 N⋅m (391 lb⋅ft) with a pure electric cruising range of 50 to 150 kilometres (31 to 93 mi). It is equipped with a BorgWarner electronically controlled four-wheel drive system, 2 differential locks, and 9 all-terrain modes. Haval claims fuel consumption on the CLTC cycle is 1.85 L/100 km (54 km/L; 153 mpg_{‑imp}; 127 mpg_{‑US}) for a combined cruising range of 1,000 kilometres (621 mi).

The petrol version is equipped with a 2.0-litre turbo four-cylinder gasoline engine with a maximum output of 175 kW (238 PS; 235 hp), mated to a 9-speed dual clutch transmission. The entry level version comes with front-wheel drive and the high-end trim levels are available with four-wheel drive.

=== Markets ===
==== Australia ====
The second-generation Big Dog was launched in Australia as the Haval H7 on 21 July 2025, in the sole Vanta trim, powered by the 1.5-litre turbocharged petrol hybrid.

==== South Africa ====
The second-generation Big Dog was launched in South Africa as the Haval H7 on 15 January 2025, with two trim levels: Luxury and Super Luxury. It is powered by either a 2.0-litre turbocharged petrol or 1.5-litre turbocharged petrol hybrid powertrains.

=== Safety ===
ANCAP test results GWM Haval H7 (2025, aligned with Euro NCAP)
Test	Points	%
Overall:	5 /5 stars	
Adult occupant:	35.93	89%
Child occupant:	44.78	91%
Pedestrian:	51.12	81%
Safety assist:	14.48	80%

== Sales ==
Year	China		
Year	Big Dog	Plus	Plus PHEV
2023	74,466	37,452	19,727
2024	89,151	35,971	10,232
2025	104,670	34,089	5,279
