= Mimi Hii =

British chemist

- Born: King Kuok Hii; 23 December 1969 (age 56)
- Education: University of Leeds
- Known for: Study of Catalysis and Rapid Analysis
- Scientific career
- Fields: Chemistry
- Workplaces: Imperial College London
- Doctoral advisor: Bernard L. Shaw

King Kuok "Mimi" Hii (born 23 December 1969) is a chemist whose fields of research include application of catalysis to organic synthesis. She is the Director of Imperial College London's Centre for Rapid Online Analysis of Reactions (ROAR).

== Academic career ==
Hii studied for both her BSc and PhD at The University of Leeds investigating multidentate ligand metal complexes under the supervision of Bernard L. Shaw. Postdoctoral studies at Oxford University in John M. Brown's group were followed by independent research at University of Leeds, King's College London and in Imperial College London. In 2016 she was awarded a Professorship in Catalysis and in 2018 became the Director of the Centre for Rapid Online Analysis of Reactions.

== Research interests ==
Hii has investigated catalysis during her research career. In Oxford, she characterised intermediates of the Heck reaction. Hii also studied this reaction at King's College London. Hii has continued with this field of study producing over a hundred articles, reviews, book chapters and patents. These include articles, reviews and books on sustainable chemistry methods. In 2010 Hii joined the Steering Group of the Engineering and Physical Sciences Research Council Dial-a-Molecule Grand Challenge network and became a Co-Investigator on phase III of the project in 2016. Hii has been awarded many grants, most notably a multi-million award from the Engineering and Physical Sciences Research Council in 2017 which, together with money from Imperial College London and industrial partners funded the set up of Imperial College London's Centre for Rapid Online Analysis of Reactions (ROAR).

== Awards and honours ==
In 2013, the Federation of Asian Chemistry Societies recognised Hii as an Asian Rising Star. Hii was also elected as a Fellow of the Royal Society of Chemistry. In 2016 Hii became co-editor in chief of the open access Chemistry Central Journal. In 2019 Mimi Hii was shortlisted for an Asian Women of Achievement Award.
