= V80 =

V80 may refer to:

== Automobiles ==
- Great Wall Voleex V80, a MPV
- Jiabao V80, a microvan
- Maxus V80, a commercial van

== Other uses ==
- DB Class V 80, a locomotive
- ITU-T V.80, a videoconferencing standard
- Kamov V-80, a Soviet helicopter design
- NEC V80, a microprocessor
- German submarine V-80
