= Toyota NZ engine =

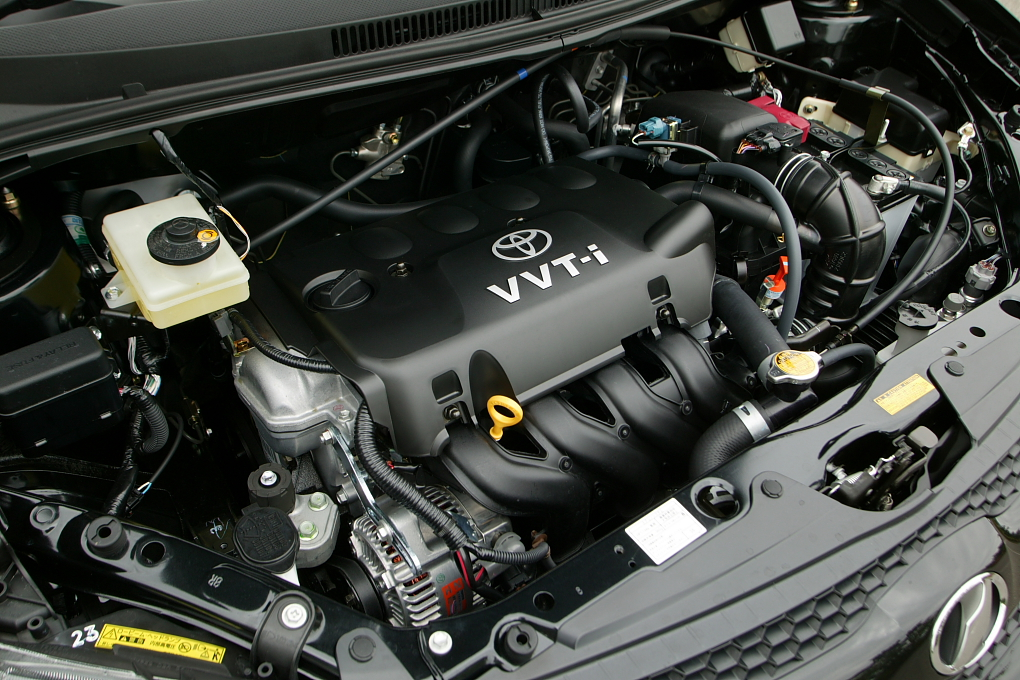

Overview
- Manufacturer: Toyota
- Designer: Yasushi Nouno; Hiroshi Tada; Toshifumi Takaoka
- Production: 1NZ-FXE: December 1997–present; 1NZ-FE: July 1999–present; 1NZ-FE Turbo: 2003–2013; 1NZ-FNE: April 2003–August 2014; 1NZ-FXP: 2017–present; 2NZ-FE: October 1999–January 2020

Layout
- Configuration: Straight-4
- Displacement: 1,298 cc (1.3 L); 1,497 cc (1.5 L)
- Cylinder bore: 75 mm (3.0 in)
- Piston stroke: 73.5 mm (2.89 in); 84.7 mm (3.3 in)
- Cylinder block material: Aluminium
- Cylinder head material: Aluminium
- Valvetrain: DOHC 4 valves per cylinder with VVT-i
- Valvetrain drive system: Timing chain
- Compression ratio: 9.5:1–13.4:1 (hybrid); 10.5:1 (turbocharged); 10.5:1–11.0:1 (naturally aspirated); 12.0:1 (CNG)

RPM range
- Idle speed: 550–750 rpm
- Max. engine speed: 6400 rpm

Combustion
- Turbocharger: IHI RHF4 with intercooler
- Fuel system: Multi-point fuel injection
- Fuel type: Petrol; LPG (1NZ-FXP); CNG (1NZ-FNE)
- Oil system: Wet sump
- Cooling system: Water-cooled

Output
- Power output: 58–152 PS (43–112 kW; 57–150 hp)
- Torque output: 102–206 N⋅m (75–152 lb⋅ft; 10–21 kg⋅m)

Chronology
- Predecessor: Toyota 5A-FE (for select markets in Asia); Toyota E engines; Toyota 2SZ-FE engine (for 2NZ-FE in China)
- Successor: Toyota NR engine (for emerging markets); Toyota 2SZ-FE engine (for 2NZ-FE in Europe); Toyota M15 engines (for 1NZ engines)

The Toyota NZ engine family is a straight-4 piston engine series. The NZ series uses aluminium open deck engine blocks and DOHC cylinder heads. It also uses sequential multi-point fuel injection, and has 4 valves per cylinder with VVT-i.

The engines are produced by Toyota's Kamigo Plant in Toyota, Aichi, Japan; by Siam Toyota Manufacturing in Chonburi, Thailand (1NZ-FE for Yaris and Vios); and by Indus Motor Company in Karachi, Pakistan (2NZ-FE for Corolla).

From the second half of 2003, the cylinder head of the Japanese market 1NZ-FE engine was revised and became the base of the post-2006 1NZ-FE Turbo and LPG-hybrid 1NZ-FXP engines.

== 1NZ-FXE (1997–present) ==
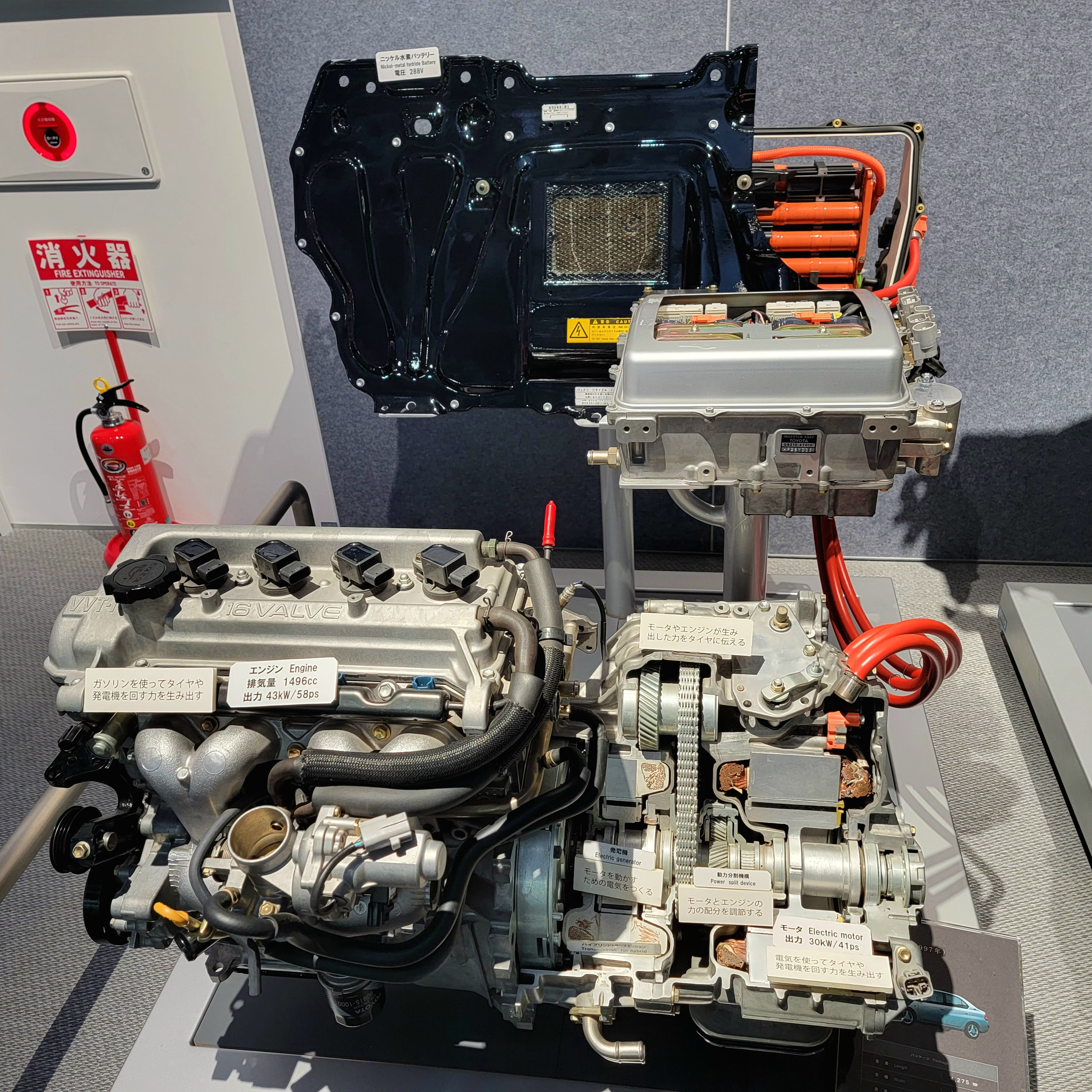
First generation 1NZ-FXE engine and 1CM electric motor (1997–2000 specification)

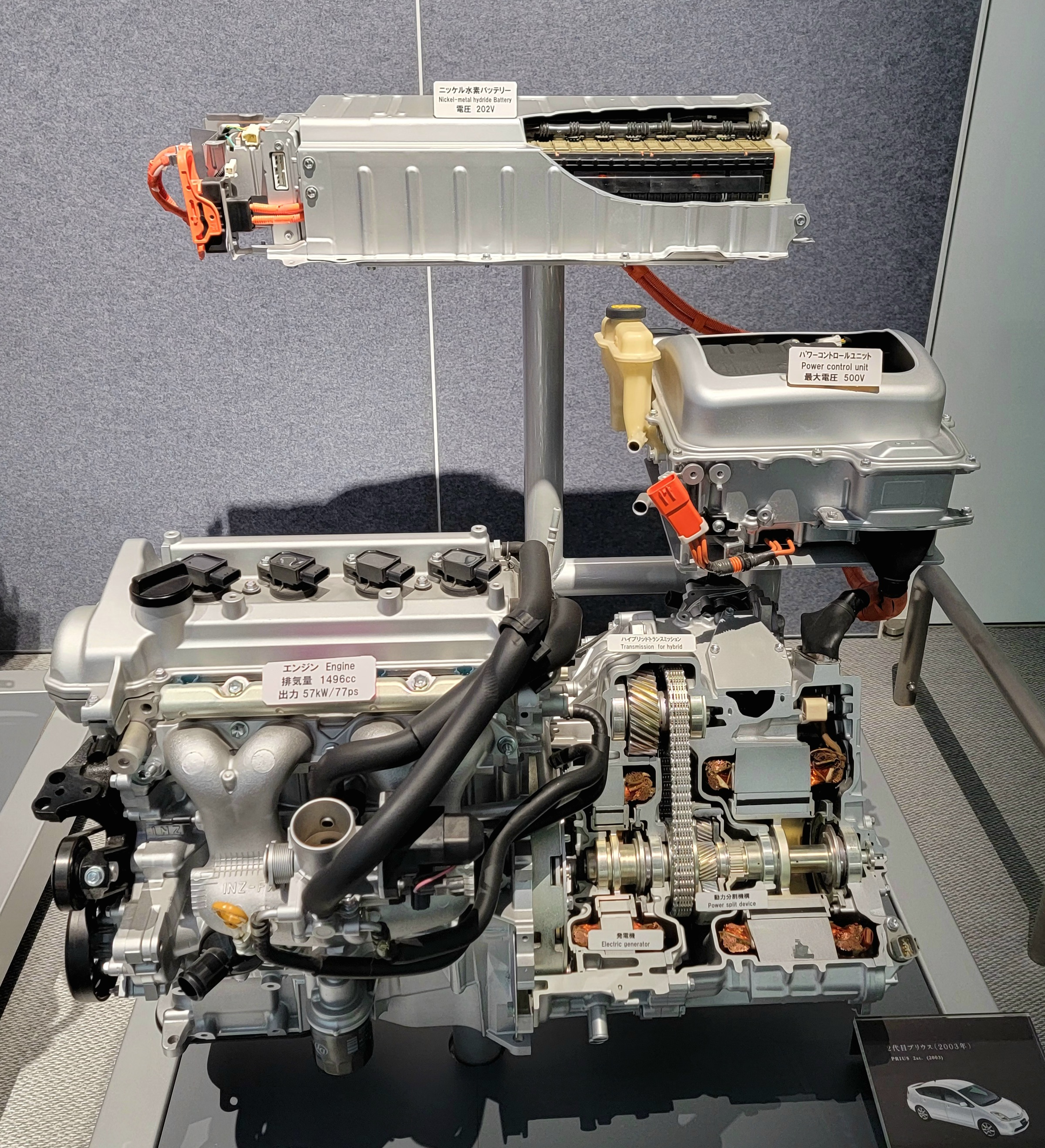
Second generation 1NZ-FXE engine and 3CM electric motor

The 1NZ-FXE is a hybrid 1.5 L (1,497 cc) version. Bore and stroke is 75 mm × 84.7 mm (2.95 in × 3.33 in). It features forged steel connecting rods and an aluminum intake manifold. The engine has a high physical compression ratio of 13.0:1, but the closing of the inlet valve is delayed, for an effective compression ratio of 9.5:1. The net result is that the engine has a greater effective expansion than compression—making it a simulated Atkinson cycle, rather than a conventional Otto cycle.

The reduction in cylinder charge means reduced torque and power output, but efficiency is increased. This combination makes the 1NZ-FXE suitable for use with the Hybrid Synergy Drive, where peak torque and power demands can be met by the electric motor and battery. Originally, the engine produces 58 PS (43 kW; 57 hp) at 4000 rpm with 102 N⋅m (75 lb⋅ft; 10 kg⋅m) of torque at 4000 rpm. In the 2000 update, the engine output was increased to 72 PS (53 kW; 71 hp) at 4500 rpm with 115 N⋅m (85 lb⋅ft; 12 kg⋅m) of torque at 4200 rpm. The power output was increased again to 77 PS (57 kW; 76 hp) at 5000 rpm for the second generation Prius. Peak thermal efficiency is about 37%.

In 2011, upon the arrival of the Prius c/Aqua and the XP130 Yaris Hybrid, an improved version was introduced. Without any belt-driven accessories (equipped with an electric water pump), implementation of exhaust gas recirculation (EGR) system and a physical compression ratio of 13.4:1. The new version delivers an output of 74 PS (54 kW; 73 hp) at 4800 rpm with 111 N⋅m (82 lb⋅ft; 11 kg⋅m) of torque at 3600–4400 rpm.

The 1NZ-FXE Hybrid Synergy Drive in the Toyota Prius has won several International Engine of the Year awards:

- Best Eco-friendly 2000
- Best Eco-friendly 2001
- Best Fuel Economy 2005
- Best 1.4-litre to 1.8-litre 2005
- Best Fuel Economy 2006
- Best 1.4-litre to 1.8-litre 2006

This engine was discontinued for international markets in 2020 and was replaced by the M15A-FXE engine. However, as of September 2026, the 1NZ-FXE engine is still available in Japan in the Toyota Probox and Mazda Familia.

Transmissions (eCVT): P110 (1997–2000), P111 (2000–2003), P112 (2003–2009) and P510 (2011–present)

=== Applications ===
- Toyota Corolla Axio/Fielder Hybrid NKE165 (2013–2025)
- Toyota Prius
  - NHW10/NHW11 (1997–2003)
  - NHW20 (2003–2009)
- Toyota Prius c/Aqua NHP10 (2011–2021)
- Toyota Probox Hybrid NHP160V (2018–present, also sold as Succeed Hybrid until 2020 and as Mazda Familia Van Hybrid (NHP160M) from 2018)
- Toyota Sienta Hybrid NHP170G (2015–2022)
- Toyota Yaris Hybrid NHP130 (2012–2020, Europe)/Vitz Hybrid NHP130 (2017–2019, Japan)
- Mitsuoka Ryugi Hybrid (2014–2025, based on Corolla Axio/Fielder Hybrid NKE165)

== 1NZ-FE (1999–present) ==
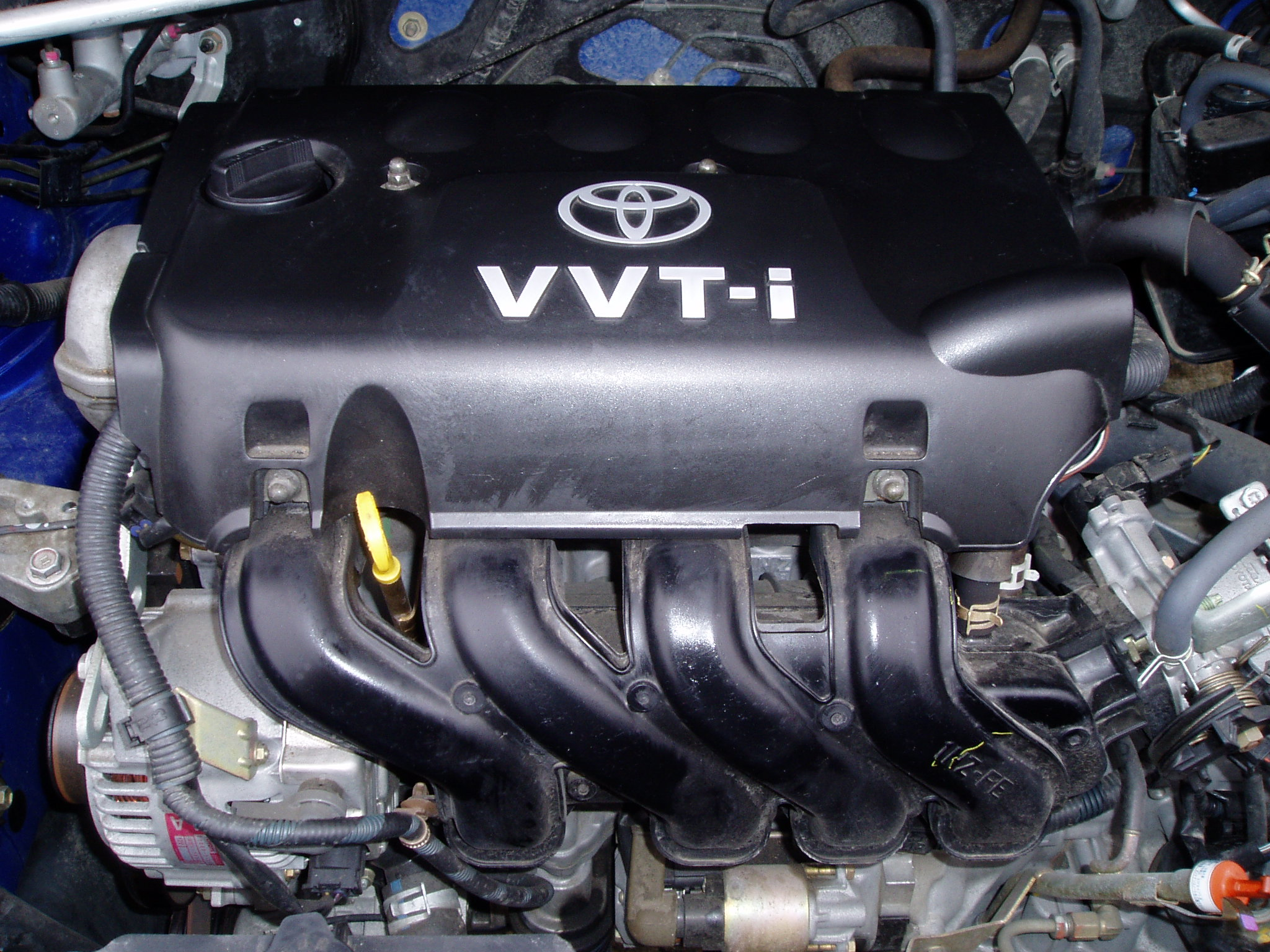
1NZ-FE engine

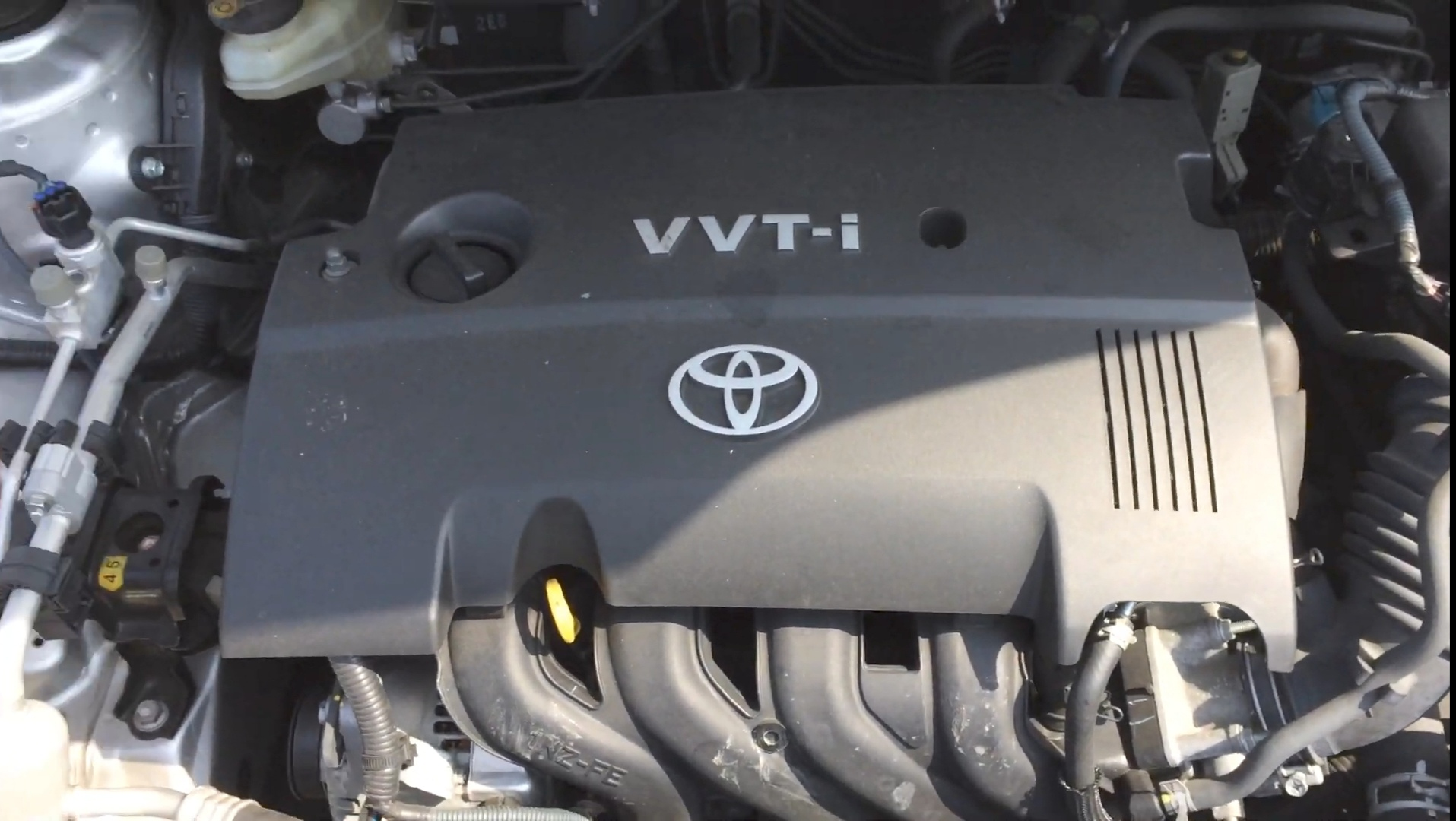
Updated 1NZ-FE engine with different plastic engine cover

The 1NZ-FE is a 1.5 L (1,497 cc) conventional Otto-cycle variant of the 1NZ-FXE with VVT-i on the intake camshaft. The engine block is found in many Toyota models assembled in Japan and Asian countries. It retains the same bore and stroke, but the compression ratio is lowered to 10.5:1. Output is 98–110 PS (72–81 kW; 97–108 hp) at 6000 rpm with 127–143 N⋅m (94–105 lb⋅ft; 13–15 kg⋅m) of torque at 4200–4800 rpm. This engine was introduced to replace 5A-FE and 5E-FE 1.5 L engines.

A new version of 1NZ-FE with major revision in the cylinder head was introduced exclusively for the Japanese market in September 2003, fitted first in the front-wheel drive model of XP80 Sienta. This new version now features a new valve train mechanism with roller rocker arms and hydraulic lash adjuster (HLA), as opposed to bucket tappet mechanism in the older version, which also reduced the valves angle from 33 to 21⁰. The oil path was also modified for better lubrication in the reworked cylinder head, implementation of EGR system and a later opening thermostat (raised from 82 to 88°C). This revised engine can be identified by the use of a different plastic engine cover. Other Japanese market models received this version during the full model change starting with the XP90 Vitz in February 2005, except for the popular E120 Corolla when it was implemented in the April 2004 facelift. Another update was occurred in 2012, the compression ratio was increased to 11.0:1. The 4-speed automatic transmission was also replaced by CVT, designed for this reworked engine. The revised engine was also offered in limited markets such as in Hong Kong, Macau and New Zealand.

The 1NZ-FE engine was discontinued earlier in 2005 in Europe without a direct replacement. For emerging markets, the Dual VVT-i 2NR-FE engine was introduced as replacement in 2016. In the first half of 2020, the 1NZ-FE engine was replaced by M15A-FXS engine in Australia and New Zealand. In Japan, the older version was officially discontinued in September 2014, along with the first generation Probox/Succeed wagons. However, as of July 2025, the updated version is still in use for the Japanese market.

Transmissions:

- Manual (5-speed): C50, C50F (AWD), C51, C54, C56, C150 and C154
- Automatic (4-speed): U340E and U340F (AWD, 2000–2014)
- CVT: K210 (2003–2015; Ractis, Sienta and Vitz), K310 (2006–2012), K310F (AWD, 2006–present) and K312 (2012–present)

=== Applications ===
* = Models powered by the original version

- Toyota Allion/Premio
  - NZT240 (2001–2007)*
  - NZT260 (2007–2021)
- Toyota Auris (Japan only)
  - NZE151H/NZE154H (2006–2012)
  - NZE181H/NZE184H (2012–2018)
- Toyota bB NCP31/NCP35 (2000–2005, also sold as Scion xB with this engine in the United States from 2003 to 2007)*
- Toyota Corolla
  - NZE121/NZE124 (2000–2006, including Japanese market Allex/Corolla RunX hatchbacks)* (Note: The front-wheel drive model of Japanese market Corolla (NZE121) received new 1NZ-FE engine in April 2004 facelift, while the all-wheel drive model (NZE124) continued with the older version.)
  - NZE141 (2007–2013, RHD "General Specification" market such as Bangladesh, Hong Kong, Jamaica, Trinidad and Tobago, etc)*
- Toyota Corolla Axio/Fielder
  - NZE141/NZE144 (2006–2012) (Note: The wagon version was officially sold in New Zealand from 2007 to 2012 with the updated engine.)
  - NZE161/NZE164 (2012–2025) (Note: The updated engine was also offered for limited export markets. The sedan was officially sold in Hong Kong and Macau with this engine from 2012 to 2015, while the wagon was available in New Zealand from 2012 to 2019.)
- Toyota Corolla Rumion NZE151N (2007–2016)
- Toyota Corolla Spacio NZE121N (2001–2007)*
- Toyota ist
  - NCP61/NCP65 (2002–2007, also sold as the xA in the Middle East and as Scion xA with this engine in the United States from 2003 to 2007)*
  - NCP110/NCP115 (2007–2016)
- Toyota Platz/Echo sedan/Yaris sedan NCP12 (1999–2005)*
- Toyota Porte
  - NNP11/NNP15 (2004–2011)*
  - NCP141/NCP145 (2011–2020, also sold as Spade)
- Toyota Probox
  - NCP51V/NCP55V/NCP58G/NCP59G (2002–2014)*
  - NCP160V/NCP165V (2014–present, also sold as Succeed until 2020 and as Mazda Familia Van (NCP160M) from 2018)
- Toyota Ractis
  - NCP100/NCP105 (2005–2010)* (Note: Only the front-wheel drive model powered by the updated engine.)
  - NCP120/NCP122/NCP125 (2010–2016, also sold as Subaru Trezia) (Note: Offered with the updated engine in Hong Kong and Macau.)
- Toyota Raum NCZ20/NCZ25 (2003–2011)*
- Toyota Sienta
  - NCP81G/NCP85G (2003–2015)*
  - NCP175G (2015–2022) (Japan only)
- Toyota Succeed NCP51V/NCP58G/NCP59G (2002–2014)*
- Toyota Vios*
  - NCP42 (2002–2007, up to 2014 in Taiwan)
  - NCP93 (2007–2013, also sold as Yaris sedan up to 2016 in Australia and Mexico)
  - NCP150 (2013–2016, also sold as Yaris sedan)
- Toyota Yaris hatchback (international)/Vitz (Japan)*
  - NCP13 (1999–2005, also sold as Echo hatchback in several markets)
  - NCP91 (2005–2013) (Note: Only Japanese market Vitz received the updated engine.)
  - NCP131 (2010–2020)
  - NCP150 (2013–2017, not marketed as Vitz)
- Toyota Yaris Verso/FunCargo NCP21/NCP25 (1999–2005)*
- Mitsuoka Galue 204/Classic (2008–2012, based on Corolla Axio NZE141)
- Mitsuoka Nouera 602 (2008–2012, based on Corolla Axio/Fielder NZE141)
- Mitsuoka Ryugi (jp) (2014–2025, based on Corolla Axio/Fielder NZE161/NZE164)
- Tommykaira Baby Gang (2001, based on Vitz NCP13)*
- Tommykaira ist (2002, based on ist NCP61 and tuned with supercharger)*
- WiLL Cypha NCP75 (2002–2005)*
- WiLL VS NZE127 (2001–2004)*

== 1NZ-FNE (2003–2014) ==
A compressed natural gas (CNG) version of 1NZ-FE engine, introduced in April 2003 and produced exclusively for the first generation Probox van until its discontinuation in August 2014. It has 12.0:1 compression ratio, output is 92 PS (68 kW; 91 hp) at 6000 rpm with 125 N⋅m (92 lb⋅ft; 13 kg⋅m) of torque at 4000 rpm. This engine was only combined with a sole 4-speed U340E automatic transmission.

Application:

- Toyota Probox DX NCP52V (2003–2014)

== 1NZ-FE Turbo (2003–2013) ==
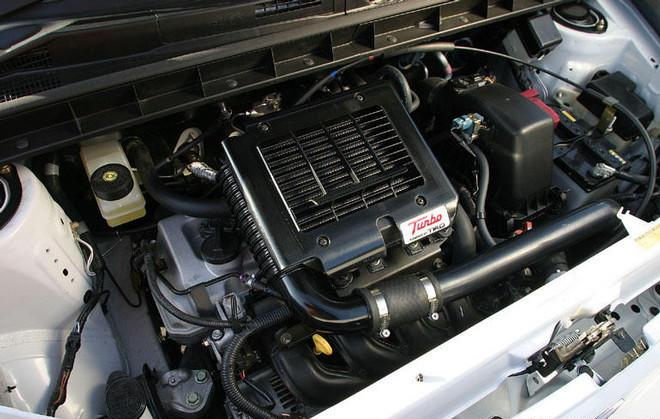
Early version with the original direct acting valve train mechanism

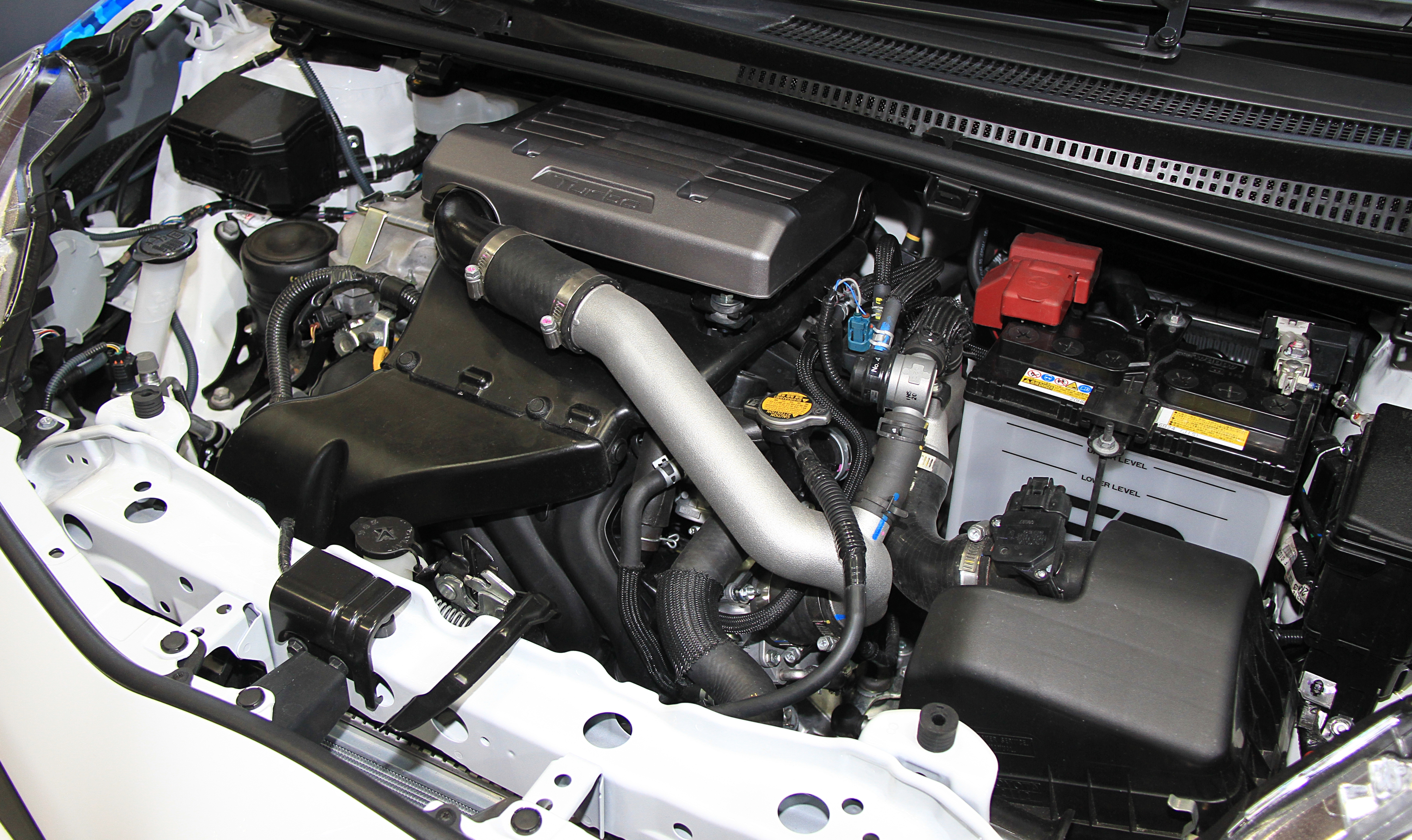
Final version with the rocker arms valve train mechanism

The 1NZ-FE Turbo (unofficially called 1NZ-FTE or 1NZ-FET) is a 1.5 L (1,497 cc) with an air-to-air intercooler turbocharged conventional Otto-cycle variant of the 1NZ-FE with VVT-i, combined with a IHI RHF4 turbocharger, providing 63.7 kPa (0.6 bar; 9.2 psi) of boost pressure. This engine was not created in-house by Toyota, but converted with bolt-on turbocharger kits developed by Toyota Racing Development (TRD). The engine block is the same as the naturally aspirated 1NZ-FE engine, found in many Toyota models. It retains the same 10.5:1 compression ratio as the naturally aspirated sibling. Output is 143–152 PS (105–112 kW; 141–150 hp) at 6000 rpm with 196–206 N⋅m (145–152 lb⋅ft; 20–21 kg⋅m) of torque at 4000–4800 rpm, depending on the model.

In Japan, this unique engine was available through modified Toyota cars (tuned by TRD, Modellista or Gazoo Racing) and sold officially as complete car at Toyota Netz Store dealerships. The turbocharger kits is also available for sale at selected Toyota Netz Store dealerships or TRD official stores. This turbocharger kits was introduced first in May 2003, originally for the NCP13 Vitz RS. Later in January 2004, TRD launched "TRD Turbo Tuning Plan", a turbocharger conversion program for NCP31 bB, XP61 ist and NCP13 Vitz RS owners. The fully converted bB and ist with turbocharger and additional TRD kits were also offered at the selected Netz Store dealerships. The turbocharger conversion program was terminated in July 2007 with the discontinuation of XP60 ist.

Starting in August 2007, this turbocharged engine was updated to the new 1NZ-FE engine, which was first introduced in the Vitz RS TRD Turbo M, modified by Modellista based on the regular NCP91 Vitz RS. TRD released a slightly different 1NZ-FE Turbo engine exclusively for NZE141 Corolla Axio/Fielder GT TRD Turbo in October 2009 and March 2010. The final application of this engine was in August 2013, with Gazoo Racing (GR) releasing the Vitz GRMN Turbo and it was also the only model officially released by Toyota in Japan. The older version was also offered in several European countries and Thailand, but only in limited numbers.

This engine is commonly combined with C56 5-speed manual transmission, except for Corolla Axio/Fielder GT which had C51 transmission. The U340E 4-speed automatic transmission was only available for the TRD fully converted bB and ist complete cars or from several converted Vitz RS with automatic transmission owned by customers.

=== Applications ===
* = Models powered by the updated version

- Toyota bB TRD Turbo NCP31 (2004–2005, tuned by TRD)
- Toyota Corolla Axio/Fielder GT TRD Turbo NZE141 (2009–2012, tuned by TRD)*
- Toyota ist TRD Turbo NCP61 (2004–2007, tuned by TRD)
- Toyota Soluna Vios Turbo NCP42 (2005, limited edition of 600 units for Thai market, tuned by TRD)
- Toyota Vitz/Yaris
  - Vitz RS Turbo Powered by TRD NCP13 (2003, tuned by Modellista)
  - Yaris TS Turbo NCP13 (2003, limited to 400 units for European market, tuned by TRD)
  - Vitz TRD Turbo M NCP91 (2007–2009, tuned by Modellista)*
  - Vitz GRMN Turbo NCP131 (2013, limited edition of 200 units, tuned by Gazoo Racing)*

== 1NZ-FXP (2017–present) ==
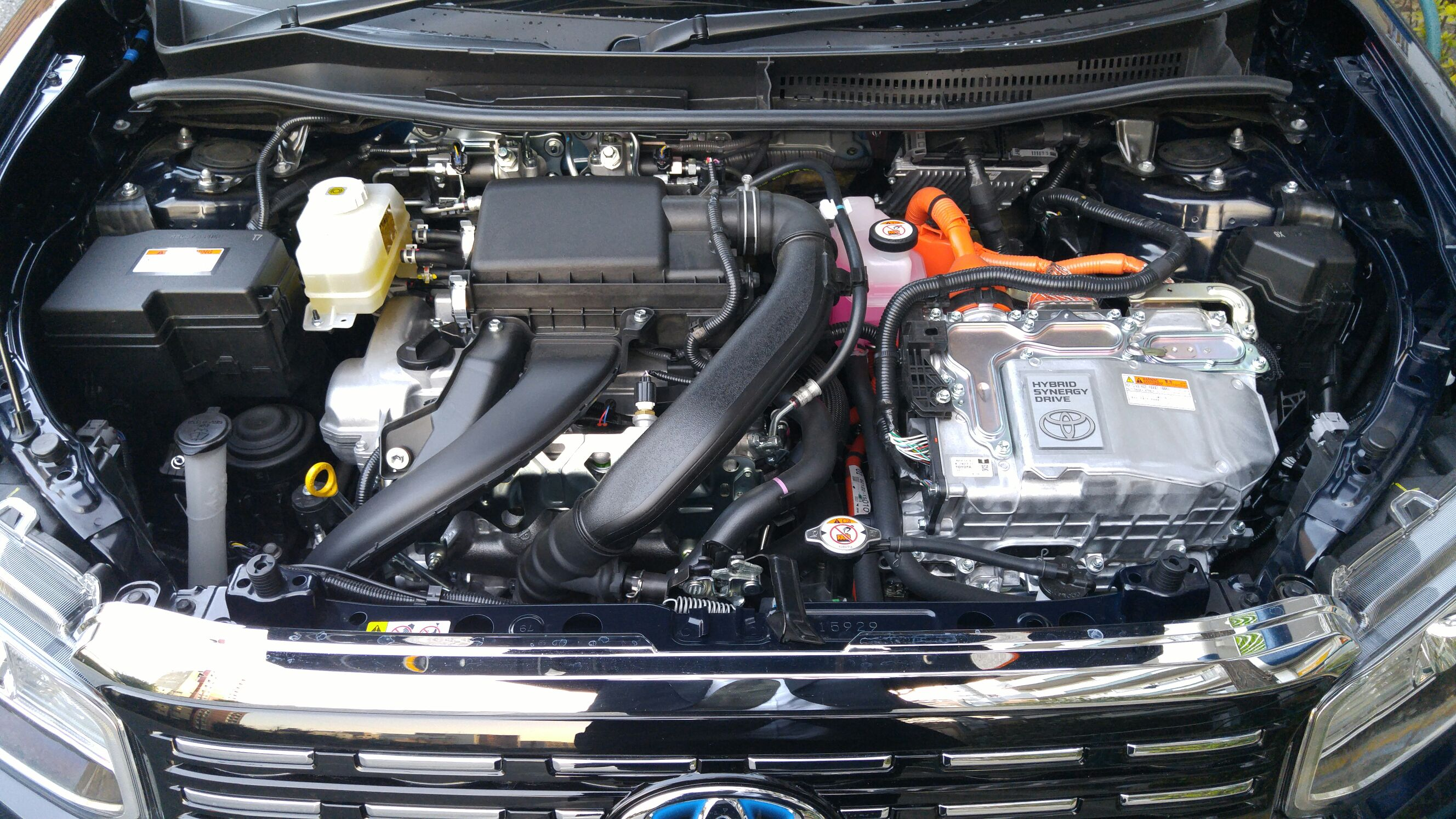
1NZ-FXP engine

The 1NZ-FXP is a hybrid 1.5 L (1,497 cc) version. Bore and stroke is 75 mm × 84.7 mm (2.95 in × 3.33 in). This engine is based on the third generation 1NZ-FXE engine but converted to run on liquefied petroleum gas (LPG) fuel and using the roller rockers arms valve train mechanism like the updated 1NZ-FE engine. The engine has a high physical compression ratio of 13.0:1, but the closing of the inlet valve is delayed, for an effective compression ratio of 9.5:1. The net result is that the engine has a greater effective expansion than compression—making it a simulated Atkinson cycle, rather than a conventional Otto cycle.

The reduction in cylinder charge means reduced torque and power output, but efficiency is increased. This combination makes the 1NZ-FXP suitable for use with the Hybrid Synergy Drive, where peak torque and power demands can be met by the electric motor, battery and LPG-hybrid system. Output is 74 PS (54 kW; 73 hp) at 4800 rpm with 111 N⋅m (82 lb⋅ft; 11 kg⋅m) of torque at 2800–4400 rpm. Peak thermal efficiency is about 37%. This engine is mated to P510 eCVT transmission, same as the third generation 1NZ-FXE engine.

Application:

- Toyota JPN Taxi/Comfort Hybrid NTP10 (2017–present)

== 2NZ-FE (1999–2020) ==
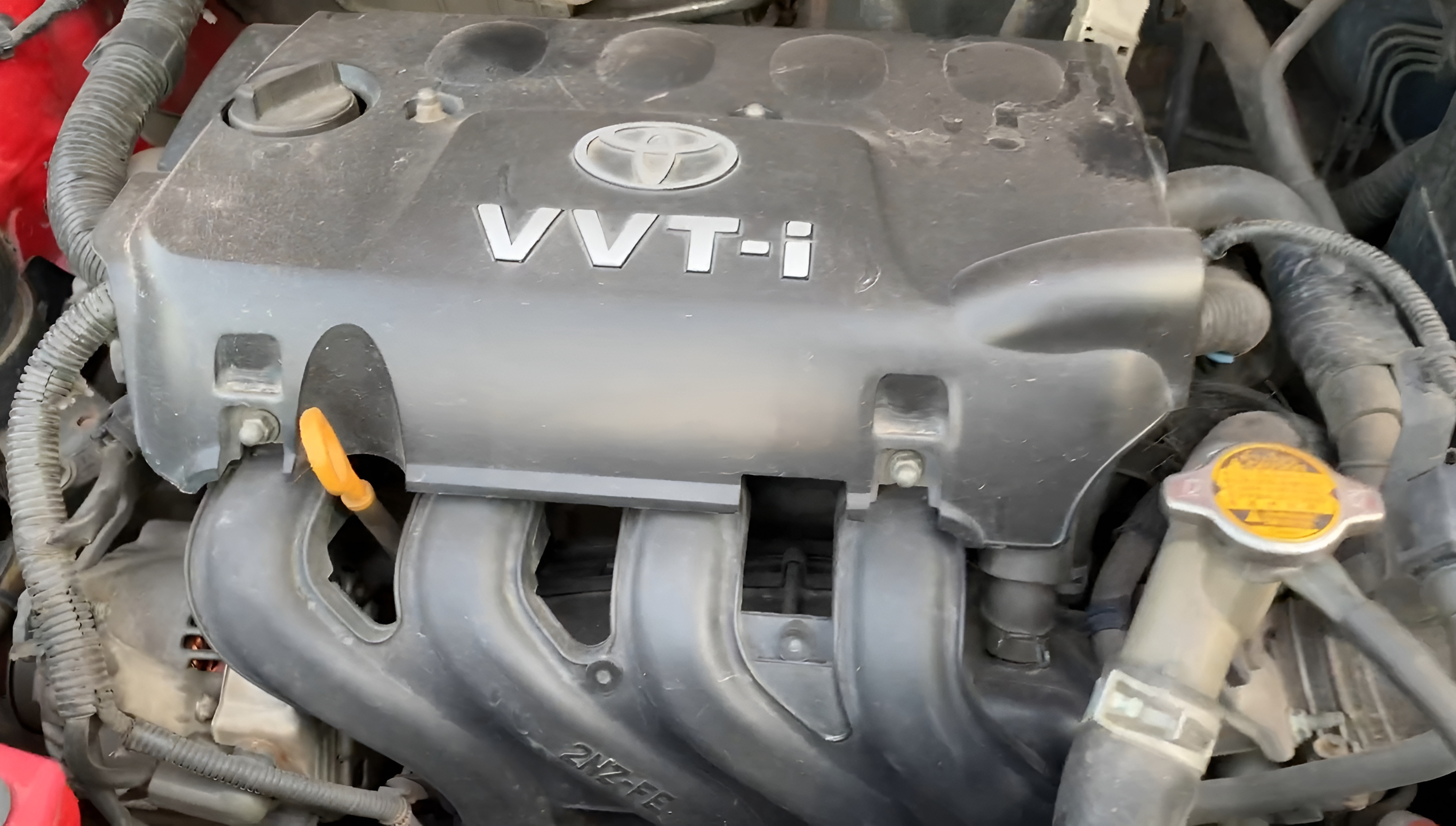
2NZ-FE engine

The 2NZ-FE is a 1.3 L (1,298 cc) version. Bore and stroke is 75 mm × 73.5 mm (2.95 in × 2.89 in), with a compression ratio of 10.5:1. Output is 86–88 PS (63–65 kW; 85–87 hp) at 6000 rpm with 121–123 N⋅m (89–91 lb⋅ft; 12–13 kg⋅m) of torque at 4400 rpm. Visually, this engine is identical to the 1NZ-FE, but can be identified by the 2NZ-FE mark on the intake manifold.

For specific regions with leaded petrol, the 2NZ-FE was not equipped with VVT-i. This version produces 81 PS (60 kW; 80 hp) at 6000 rpm with 119 N⋅m (88 lb⋅ft; 12 kg⋅m) of torque at 4400 rpm. The later version produces 87 PS (64 kW; 86 hp) at 6000 rpm with 120 N⋅m (89 lb⋅ft; 12 kg⋅m) of torque at 4200 rpm.

In 2000, it won the International Engine of the Year award in the 1-litre to 1.4-litre category.

This engine is the successor of 2E and 4E-FE 1.3 L engines. In China, it replaced the 2SZ-FE engine, together with the introduction of XP90 Vios/Yaris in 2008. The opposite case happened in Europe, like the 1.5 L 1NZ-FE engine, the 2NZ-FE engine was discontinued earlier in 2005, but succeeded by 2SZ-FE engine for the XP90 Yaris. In 2013, the exclusive Dual VVT-i 4NR-FE (for FAW Toyota) and 6NR-FE (for GAC Toyota) 1.3 L engines were introduced as the replacement for Chinese market XP150 Vios/Yaris. Later in 2016, the global version of those engines, called 1NR-FE, was introduced as the successor of 2NZ-FE engine for emerging markets XP150 Vios/Yaris. The last use of 2NZ-FE engine was in Australasia and Pakistan, where it was discontinued in the first half of 2020.

Transmissions:

- Manual (5-speed): C50, C50F (AWD), C54, C150 and C154
- Automatic (4-speed): U441E and U441F (AWD)

=== Applications ===
- Toyota bB NCP30 (2000–2005)
- Toyota Corolla
  - NZE120 (2000–2008, Africa, Japan, Middle East, Pakistan and Vietnam)
  - NZE140 (2008–2014, Pakistan only)
  - NZE170 (2014–2020, Pakistan only)
- Toyota FunCargo/Echo Verso/Yaris Verso NCP20 (1999–2005)
- Toyota ist NCP60 (2002–2007)
- Toyota Platz/Echo sedan/Yaris sedan NCP11/NCP16 (1999–2005)
- Toyota Porte NNP10 (2004–2012)
- Toyota Probox NCP50V (2002–2014)
- Toyota Vios
  - NCP41 (2003–2007, Philippines only)
  - NCP92/NCP96 (2005–2013, also sold as Belta in Japan and Yaris sedan elsewhere)
  - NCP151 (2013–2016, also sold as Yaris sedan)
- Toyota Yaris (international)/Toyota Vitz (Japan)
  - NCP10/NCP15 (1999–2005, also sold as Echo hatchback)
  - NCP90/NCP95 (2005–2010, up to 2016 in China)
  - NCP130 (2010–2020, only available for Australasian, Middle Eastern and Latin American markets)
  - NCP151 (2013–2016, not marketed as Vitz)
- WiLL Vi NCP19 2000–2001
- WiLL Cypha NCP70 2002–2005

== Great Wall Motor version ==
In May 2008, Chinese automobile manufacturer Great Wall Motor (GWM) introduced 1.3 and 1.5 L engines codenamed GW4G13 and GW4G15. Despite the similar codes, they have nothing to do with 4G13 and 4G15 engines from the Mitsubishi Orion engine family, but instead derived from NZ design. For example, the NZ engines are using timing chain to connect the crankshaft and camshafts, while the Mitsubishi Orion engines are using the less durable timing belt. Visually, this engine looks similar to the NZ engines and mechanically also shares similarities such as the same bore x stroke size, engine displacement and interchangeable parts.

No statement from GWM or Toyota regarding the confirmation if these engines are officially licensed by GWM. But according to the official press release by GWM in 2009, these GW4G1x engines were independently developed by themselves. There are also no reports of Toyota taking legal action against GWM regarding the intellectual property rights of NZ engines or even their copied vehicles, such as the Deer truck (N140 Hilux) or the Coolbear hatchback (XP30 bB). Only 1.3 L 2NZ-FE and 1.5 L 1NZ-FXE engines were officially available in China. The former was fitted inside the locally assembled XP90 Vios sedan (FAW Toyota)/Yaris hatchback (GAC Toyota) from 2008 to 2013, while the latter was offered for the locally assembled XW20 Prius (FAW Toyota).

The turbocharged variants of the 1.5 L engine called GW4G15T was introduced in 2011 and then followed by the higher output GW4G15B in the following year. These engines were discontinued in 2019, replaced by the cleaner GW4G15F which comply with China's National V emission standard. Further new variants which comply with National VI emission standard codenamed GW4G15K, GW4G15M and the naturally aspirated hybrid GW4G15H are also introduced. Unlike the naturally aspirated version, these turbocharged/hybrid engines are distinguishable by their black cylinder head covers and distinct top shape.

=== GW4G13 ===
Power: 92 PS (68 kW; 91 hp) at 6,000 rpm
Torque: 118 N⋅m (87 lb⋅ft; 12 kg⋅m) at 4,200 rpm

Applications:

- Great Wall Florid (2008–2013)
- Great Wall Peri/Haval M1 (2008–2010)
- Great Wall Voleex C10 (2010–2014)

=== GW4G15 ===
Power: 106 PS (78 kW; 105 hp) at 6,000 rpm
Torque: 138 N⋅m (102 lb⋅ft; 14 kg⋅m) at 4,200 rpm

Applications:

- Great Wall Coolbear/Haval M2 (2009–2015)
- Great Wall Florid (2008–2013)
- Great Wall M4/Haval H1/Voleex C20R (2012–2021)
- Great Wall Voleex C10 (2010–2014)
- Great Wall Voleex C30 (2010–2016)

=== GW4G15T ===
Power: 133 PS (98 kW; 131 hp) at 5,600 rpm
Torque: 188 N⋅m (139 lb⋅ft; 19 kg⋅m) at 2,000–4,500 rpm

Applications:

- Great Wall Voleex C50 (2012–2016)
- Great Wall Voleex V80 (2013–2015)

=== GW4G15B ===
Power: 150 PS (110 kW; 148 hp) at 5,600 rpm
Torque: 210 N⋅m (155 lb⋅ft; 21 kg⋅m) at 2,200–4,500 rpm

Applications:

- Haval H2 (2014–2021)
- Haval H2s (2016–2019)
- Haval H6 (2012–2018)
- Haval H6 Coupe (2016–2018)
- Haval M6 (2017–2019)

=== GW4G15F ===
Power: 150 PS (110 kW; 148 hp) at 5,600–6,000 rpm
Torque: 210 N⋅m (155 lb⋅ft; 21 kg⋅m) at 1,800–4,400 rpm

Applications:

- Haval H4 (2020)
- Haval H6 (2019–2020)
- Haval H6 Coupe (2020–2021)
- Haval F5 (2020)
- Haval M6 (2021–2023)

=== GW4G15K ===
Power: 143–150 PS (105–110 kW; 141–148 hp) at 5,500–6,000 rpm
Torque: 210–220 N⋅m (155–162 lb⋅ft; 21–22 kg⋅m) at 2,000–4,400 rpm

Applications:

- Haval Chitu (2022–present)
- Haval Jolion (2021–present)

=== GW4G15M ===
Power: 143–150 PS (105–110 kW; 141–148 hp) at 5,500–6,000 rpm
Torque: 210–218 N⋅m (155–161 lb⋅ft; 21–22 kg⋅m) at 1,800–4,400 rpm

Applications:

- Haval Chitu (2023–present)
- Haval Cool Dog/H3 (2022–present)
- Haval H6 (2022–present)
- Haval M6 (2023–2024)

=== GW4G15H ===
Power:
95 PS (70 kW; 94 hp) (engine)
150 PS (110 kW; 148 hp) (electric motor)
189 PS (139 kW; 186 hp) (combined)
Torque:
125 N⋅m (92 lb⋅ft; 13 kg⋅m) (engine)
250 N⋅m (184 lb⋅ft; 25 kg⋅m) (electric motor)
375 N⋅m (277 lb⋅ft; 38 kg⋅m) (combined)

Applications:

- Haval Chitu Hybrid (2022–present)
- Haval Jolion Hybrid (2021–present, export market)
- Haval Xiaolong PHEV (2023–present)

== See also ==
- List of Toyota engines
