= Great Wall Coolbear =

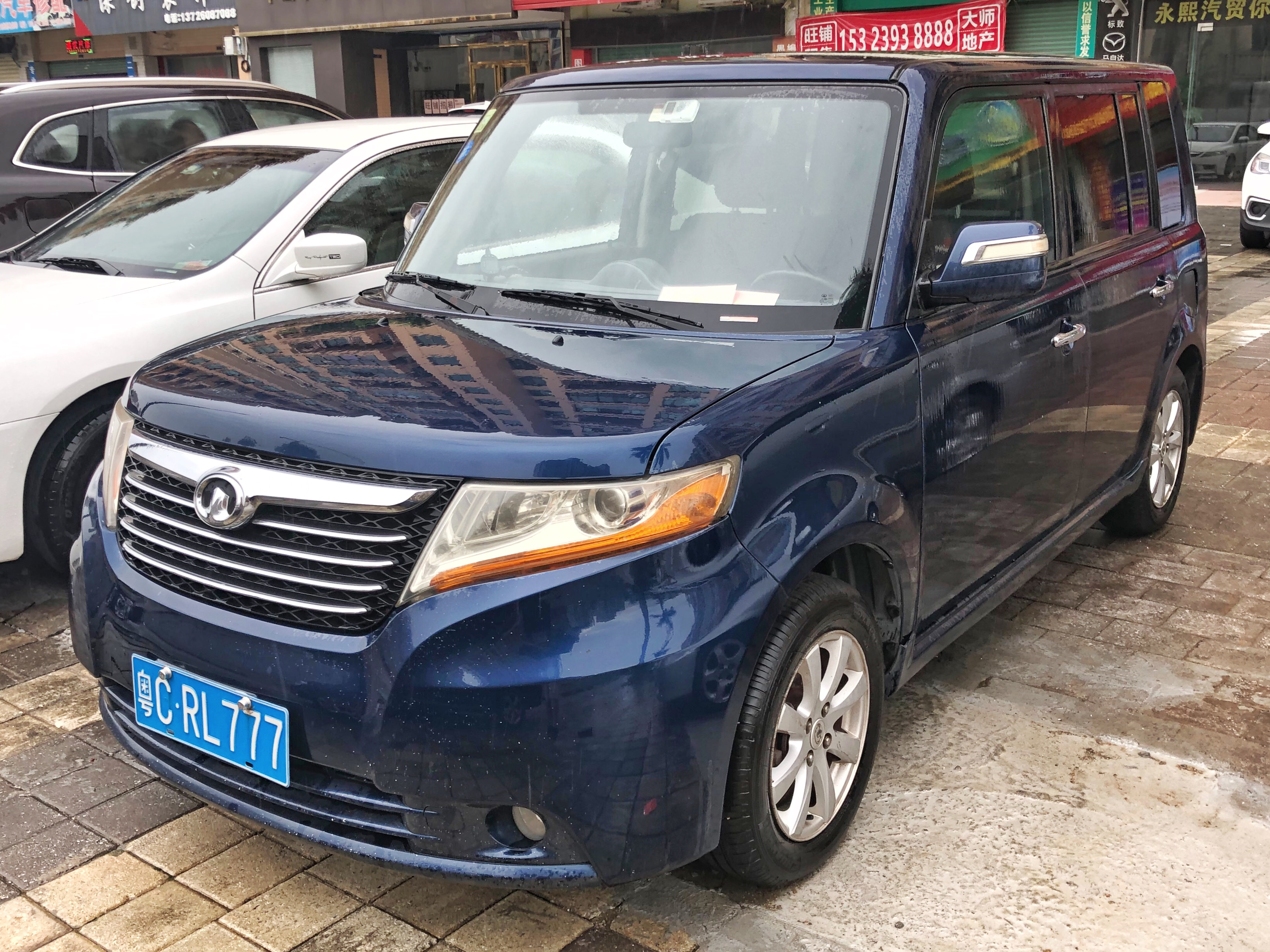

Overview
- Manufacturer: Great Wall Motors
- Also called: Great Wall Haval M2
- Production: 2009–2015
- Model years: 2010–2015
- Designer: TJ Innova Engineering & Technology

Body and chassis
- Class: Subcompact car (B)
- Body style: 5-door hatchback

Powertrain
- Engine: Petrol: 1.3 L GW4G13 I4; 1.5 L GW4G15 I4
- Transmission: 5 speed manual CVT

Dimensions
- Wheelbase: 2,499 mm (98.4 in)
- Length: 3,968 mm (156.2 in)
- Width: 1,695 mm (66.7 in)
- Height: 1,634 mm (64.3 in)
- Curb weight: 1,125–1,155 kg (2,480–2,546 lb)

The Great Wall Coolbear (Chinese: 长城酷熊; pinyin: Chángchéng Kùxióng) is a subcompact car designed with a high seating position. Its competitors include Kia Soul, Scion xB, and Nissan Cube.

== Design ==
The Coolbear's design is a copy of many Scion models. The side and rear is similar to a first generation Scion xB, and the front is also a close copy of the Toyota F3R concept car. The Coolbear comes in with choice of two petrol engines: 1.3 L and 1.5 L.

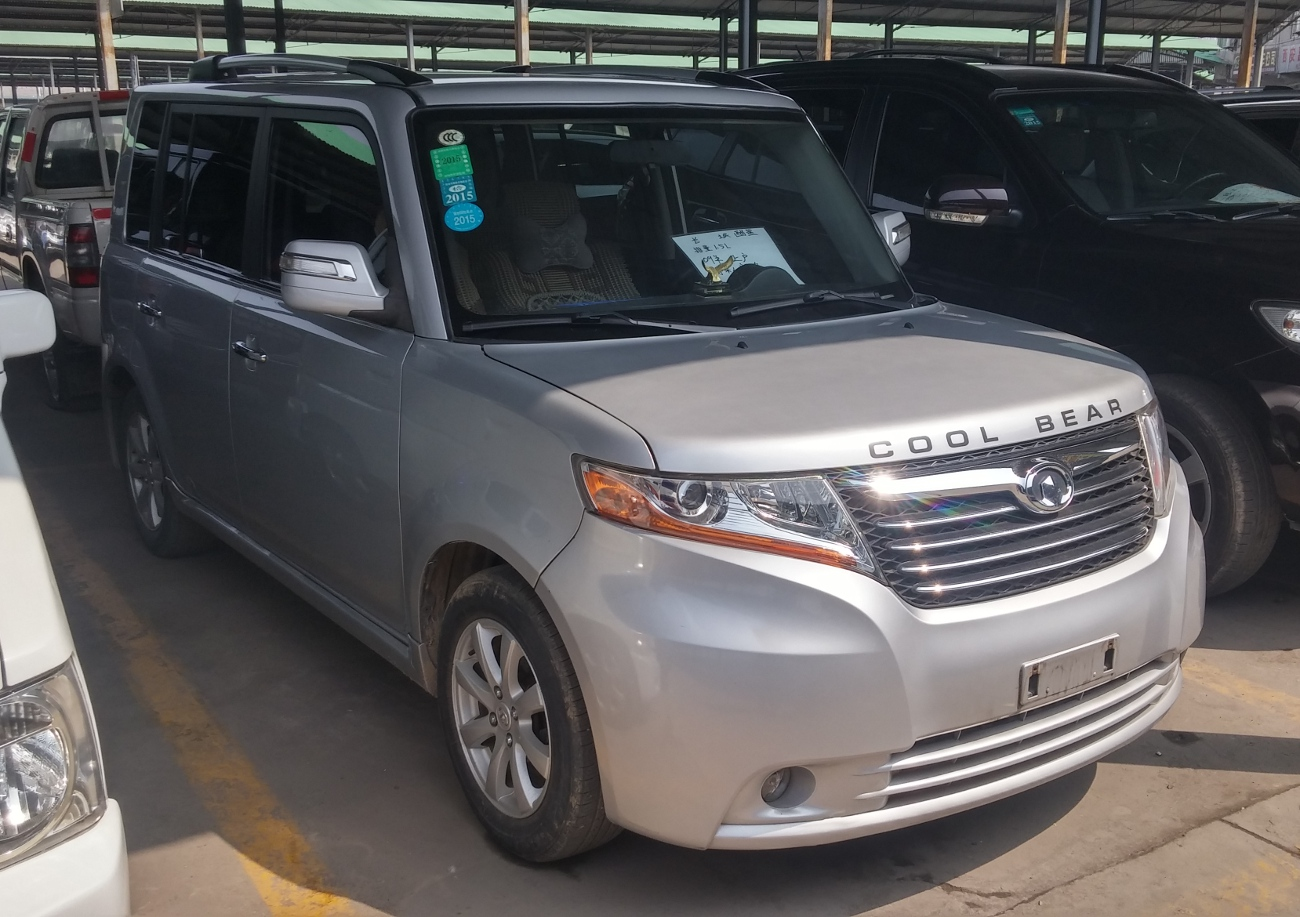
Pre-facelift version of the Great Wall Coolbear.

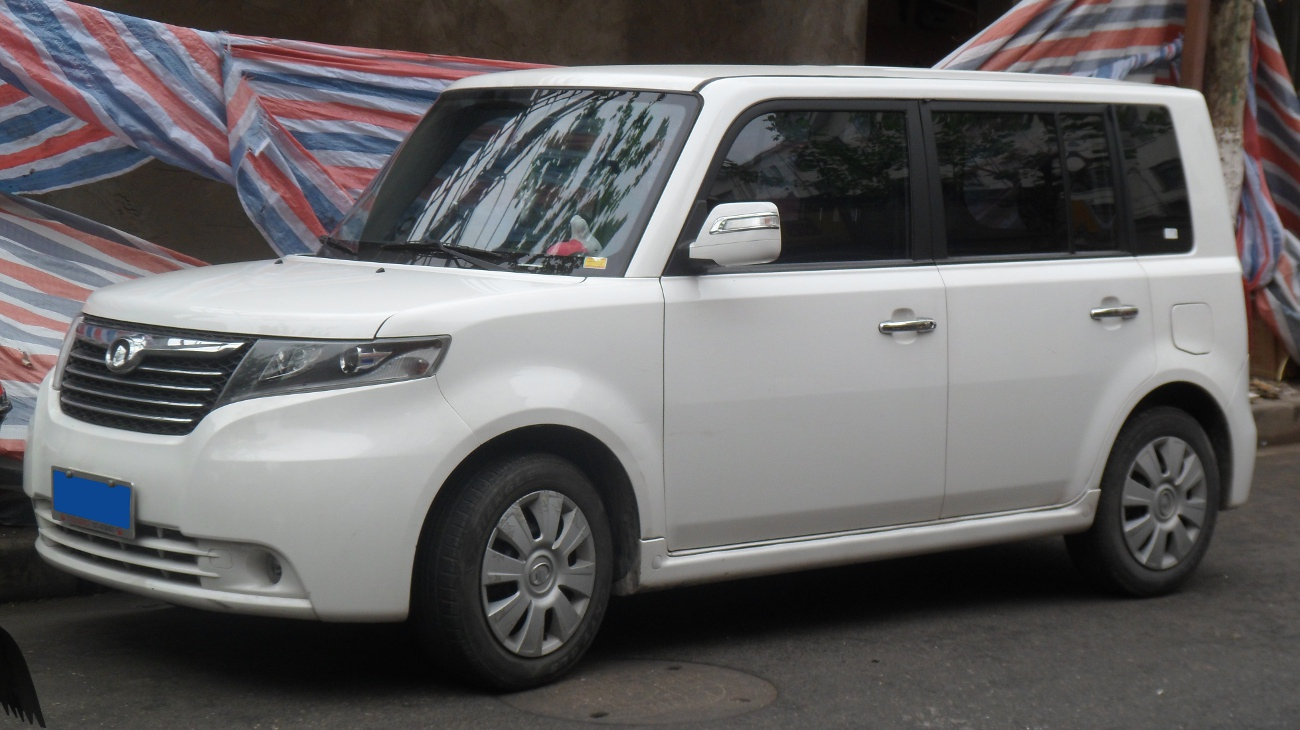
The front view of the Great Wall Coolbear.

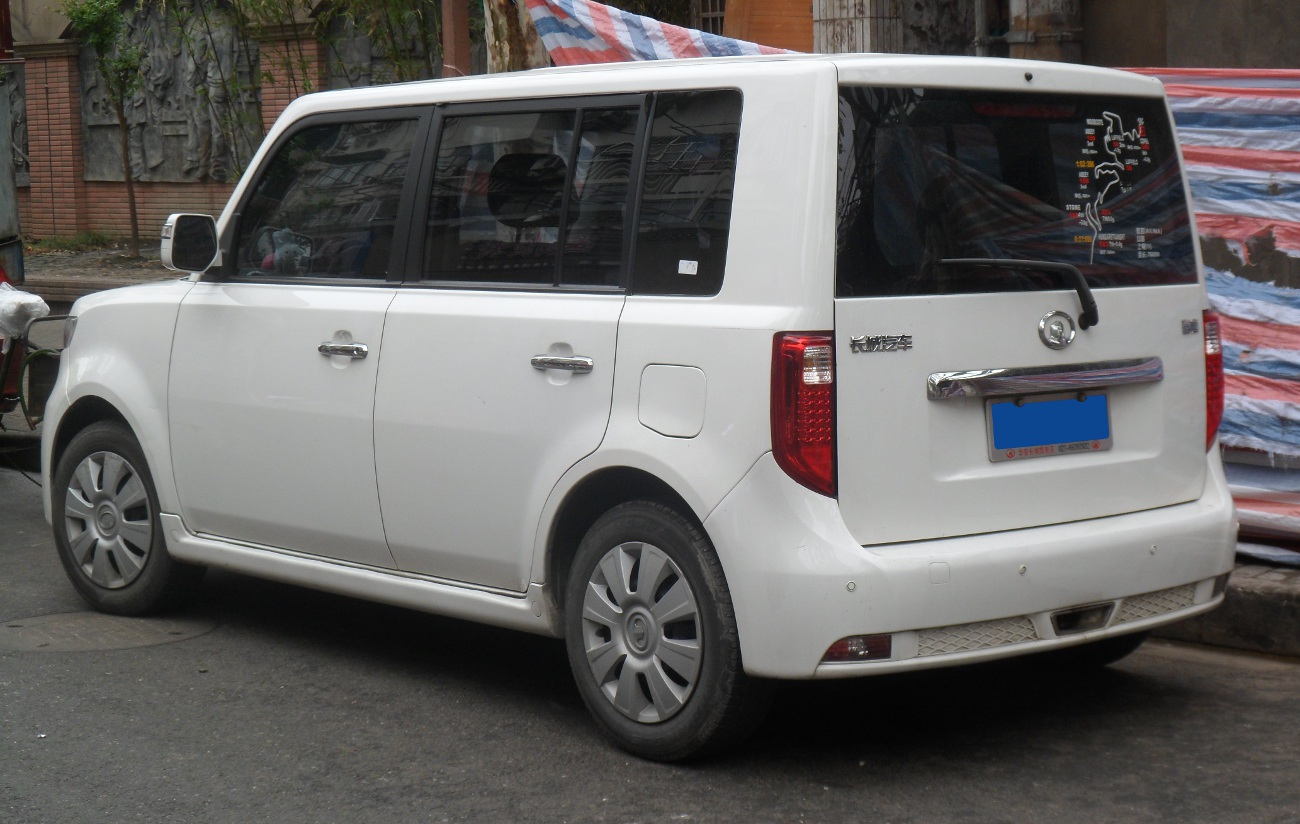
The rear view of the Great Wall Coolbear.

== Great Wall Haval M2 ==
The Great Wall Haval M2 is the lifted crossover version of the Great Wall Coolbear. It was launched after a few years and was marketed under the Haval sub-brand.

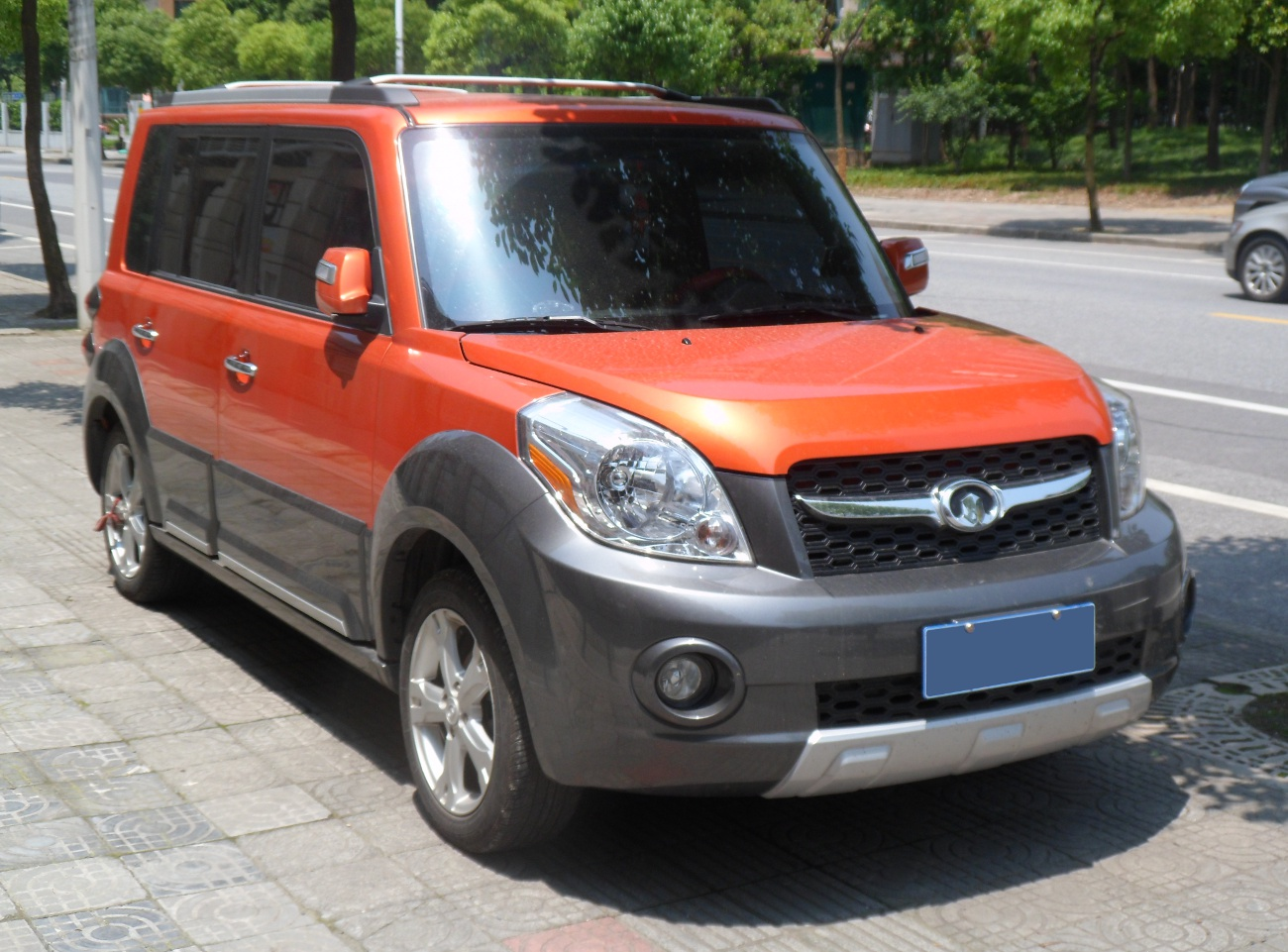
The front view of the Great Wall Haval M2.

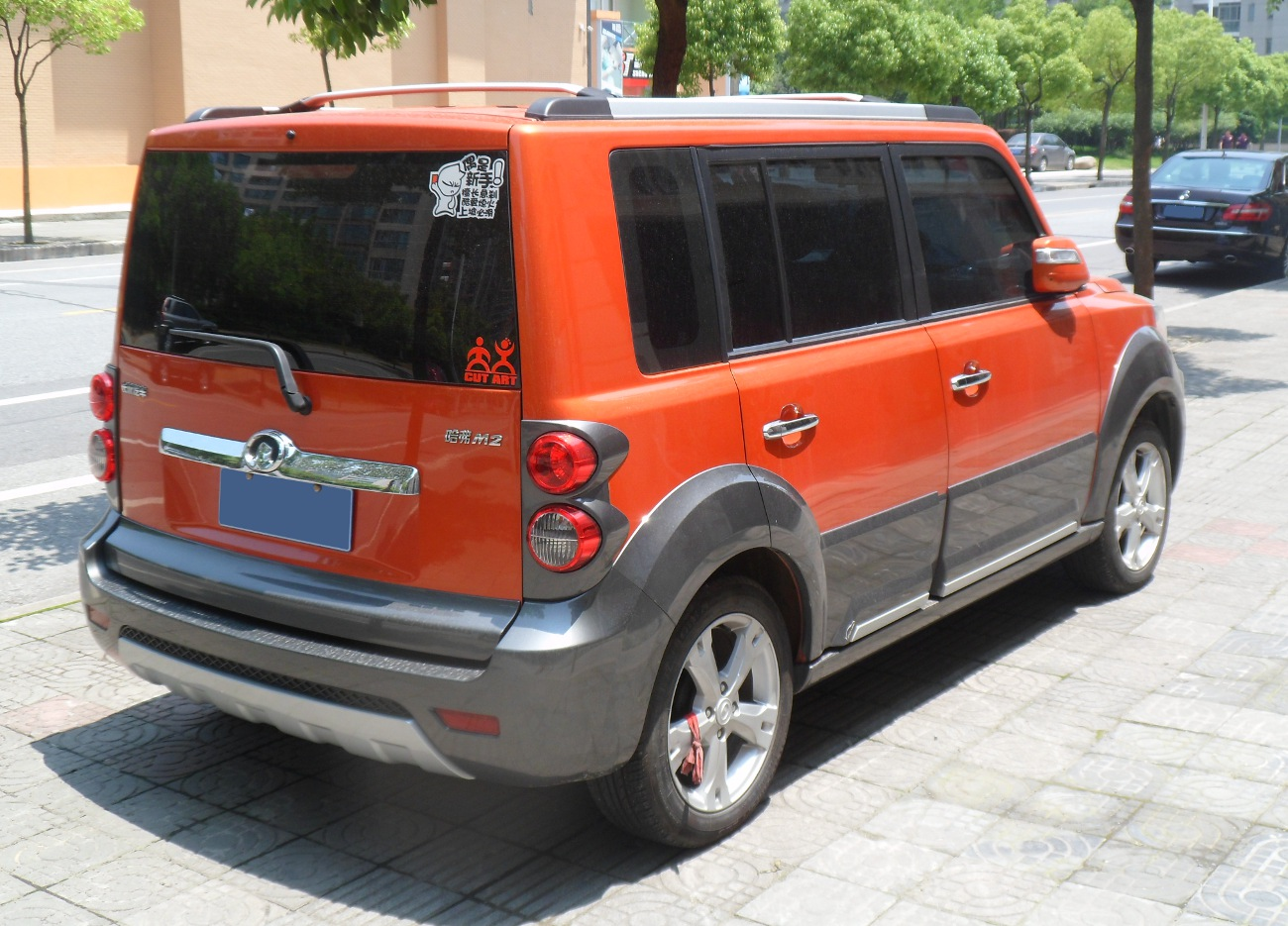
The rear view of the Great Wall Haval M2.
