= Great Wall Voleex C50 =

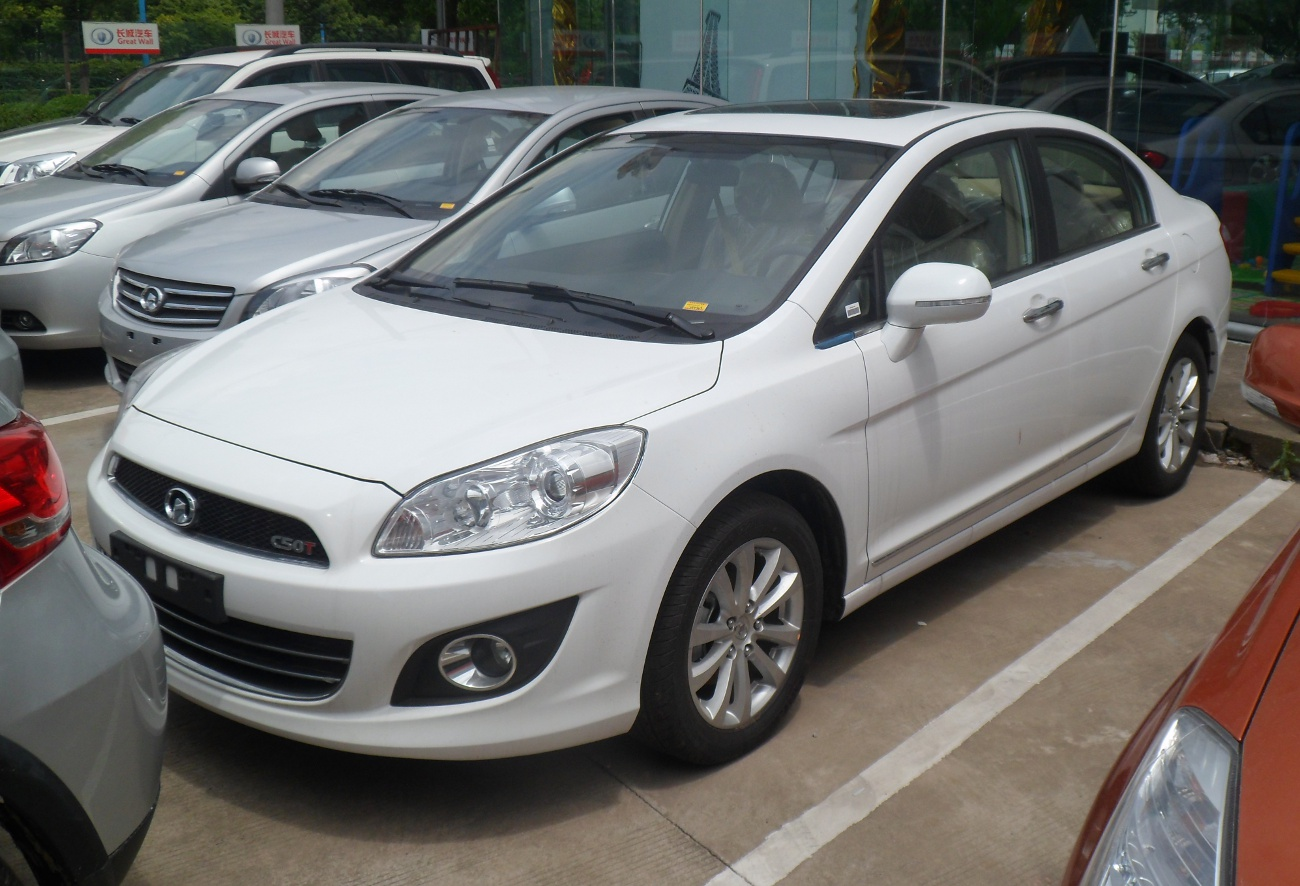

Overview
- Manufacturer: Great Wall Motors
- Production: 2012–2016
- Assembly: Baoding, China

Body and chassis
- Class: compact car
- Body style: 4-door sedan
- Layout: Front-engine, front-wheel-drive

Powertrain
- Engine: Petrol: 1.5 L GW4G15T I4 turbo
- Transmission: 5-speed manual

Dimensions
- Wheelbase: 2,700 mm (106.3 in)
- Length: 4,650 mm (183.1 in)
- Width: 1,775 mm (69.9 in)
- Height: 1,455 mm (57.3 in)
- Curb weight: 1,255 kg (2,767 lb)

The Great Wall Voleex C50 is a compact car manufactured by the Chinese company Great Wall Motors from 2012 to 2016.

== Overview ==
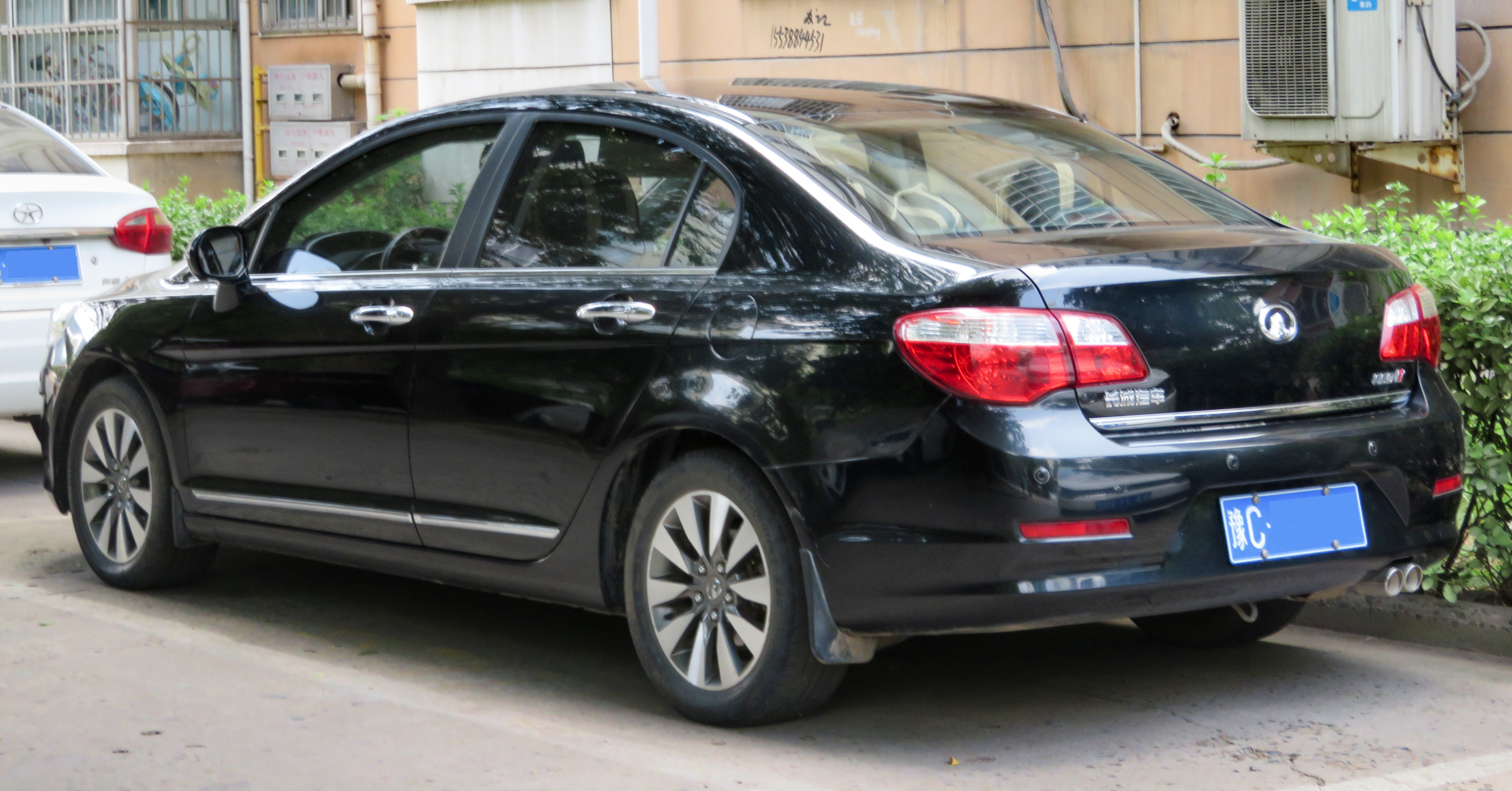
Great Wall Voleex C50 rear

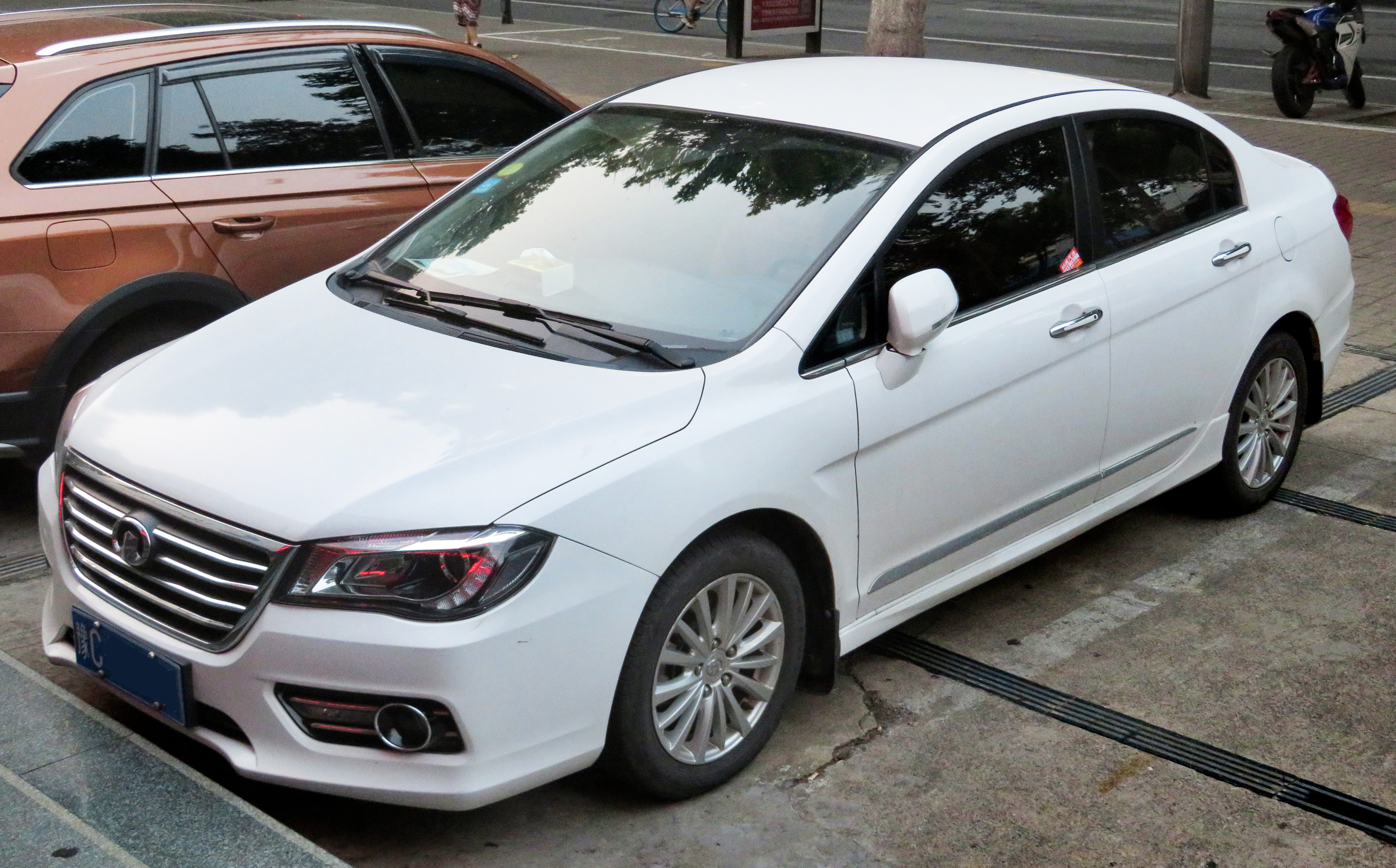
Great Wall Voleex C50 facelift front

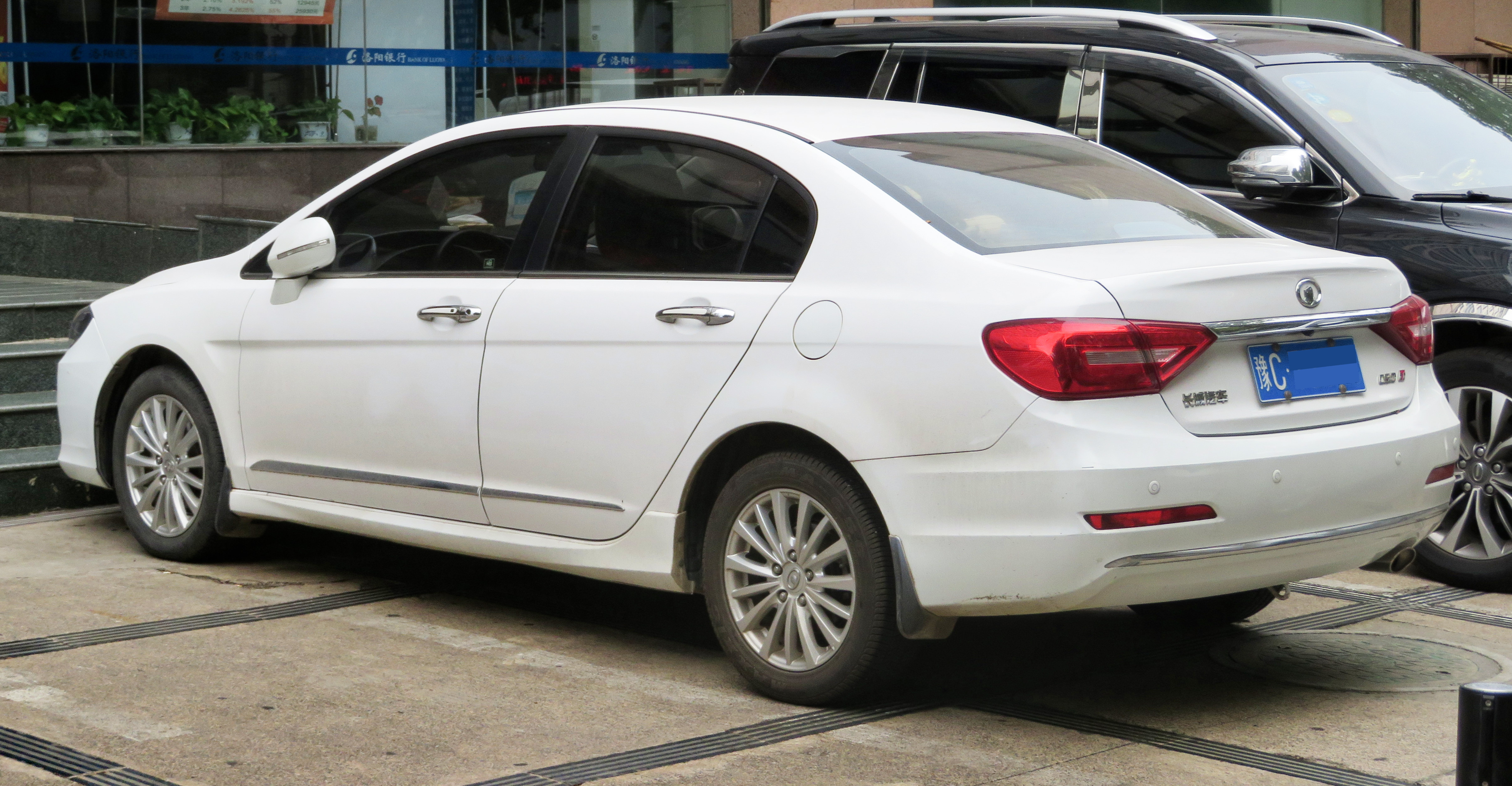
Great Wall Voleex C50 facelift rear

The Voleex C50 was launched at the 2011 Guangzhou International Motor Show. The styling of the side profile of the Great Wall Voleex C50 heavily resembles an Eighth generation Honda Civic sedan.

== Features ==
The car is powered by a 1.5-litre turbocharged petrol engine, delivering up to 131 hp (98 kW) at 5600 rpm, with a peak torque of 188 N⋅m (19 m⋅kgf; 139 lb⋅ft) between 2000 and 4500 rpm. It is the first turbocharged model of the Chinese manufacturer. The combined fuel consumption is 6.9 L/100 km (41 mpg_{‑imp}; 34 mpg_{‑US}) and the top speed is 185 km/h (115 mph). It complies with the Euro IV emission standards.

It comes with standard front airbags, ABS, EBD, ESP, trip computer, and optionally can be equipped with electric sunroof, leather seats, side and curtain airbags, cruise control or rear parking sensors.

== Safety ==
In December 2012, it was awarded five stars by China-NCAP, the Chinese New Car Assessment Program, in a session that used newer, revised standards. It scored a total of 52.5 points. This result included: 14.68 points in the frontal 100% crash test, 14.54 points in the frontal offset 40% crash test, 17.37 points in the side crash test, 2.73 points in the seat whiplash test, and 3 bonus points.
