= Great Wall Cowry =

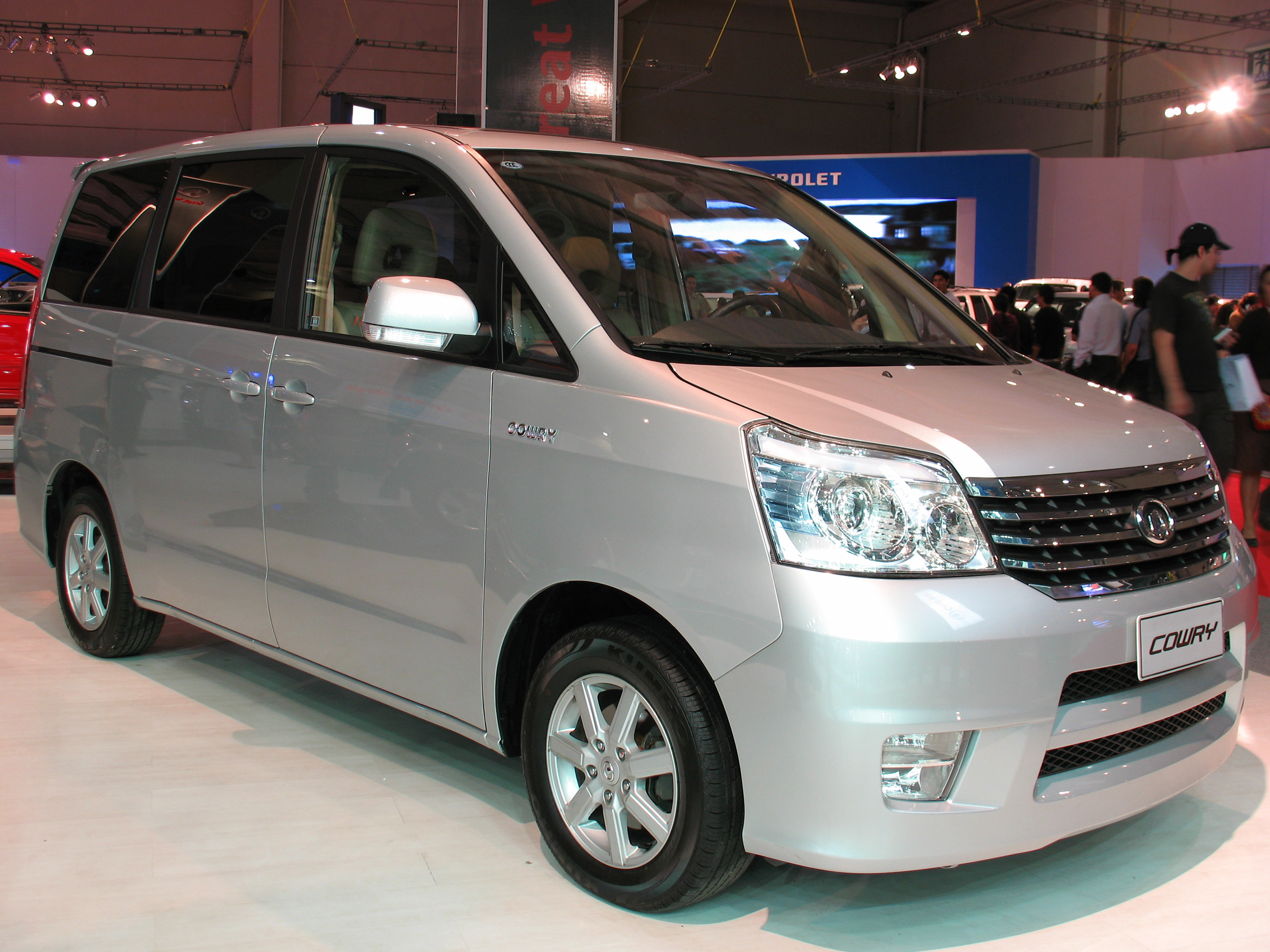

Overview
- Manufacturer: Great Wall Motors
- Also called: Great Wall Voleex V80
- Production: 2007–2015

Body and chassis
- Class: Minivan
- Body style: 5-door Minivan

Powertrain
- Engine: Petrol: 1.5 L GW4G15T I4 turbo 2.0 L 4G63S4M/N I4; 2.4 L 4G69S4M I4
- Transmission: 5 speed manual 4 speed automatic

Dimensions
- Wheelbase: 2,825 mm (111.2 in)
- Length: 4,574 mm (180.1 in)
- Width: 1,704 mm (67.1 in)
- Height: 1,845 mm (72.6 in)

The Great Wall Cowry (Chinese: 长城嘉誉; pinyin: Chángchéng Jiāyù), also known as the Great Wall Voleex V80, is a minivan made by the Chinese automaker Great Wall Motors. The styling of the Great Wall Cowry heavily resembles the Toyota Noah AZR60 (2001-2007).

== Specification ==
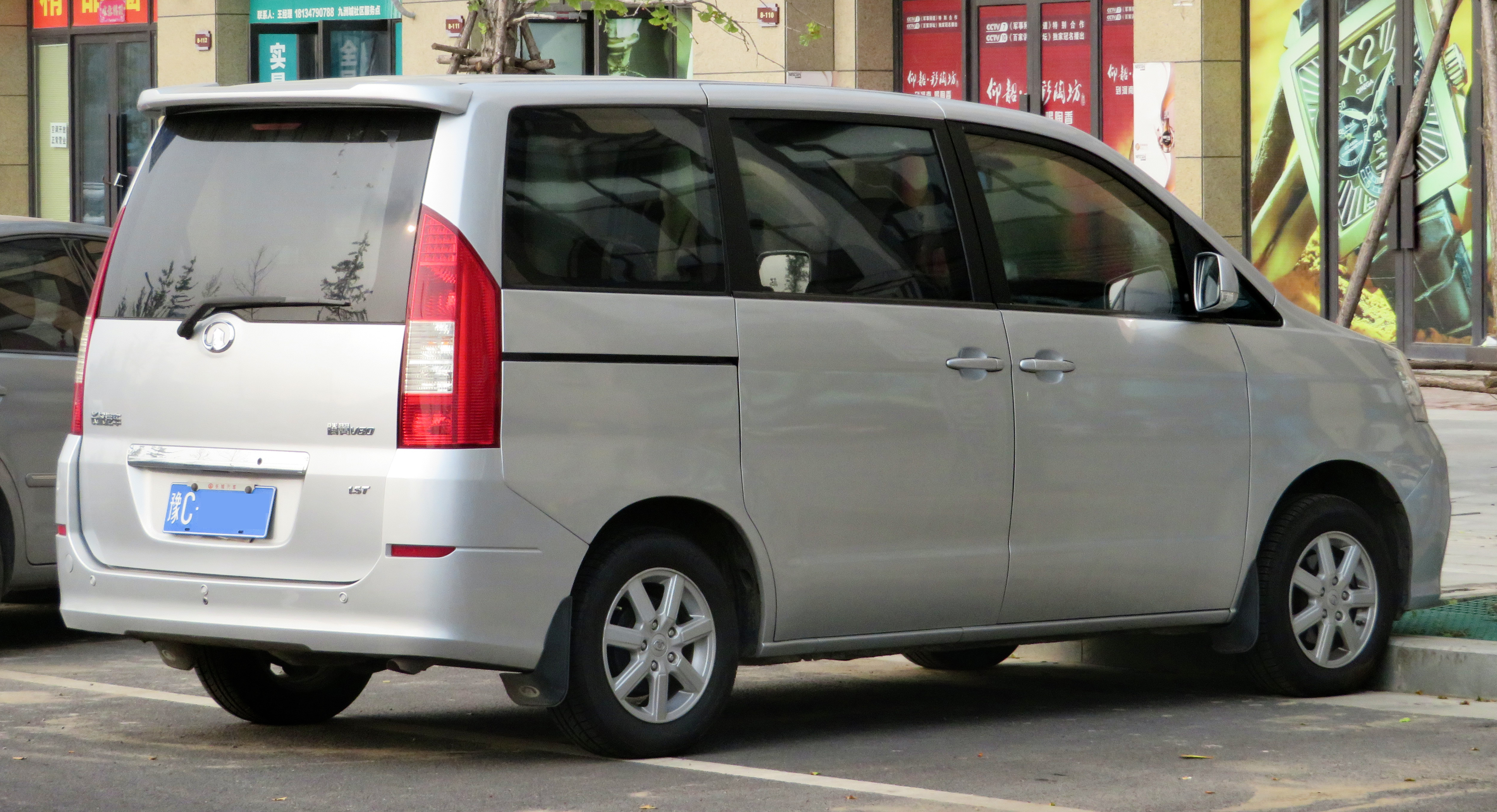
Great Wall Voleex V80; rear view

It comes with a choice of 2.0L or 2.4L inline-4 petrol engines producing 105 kW (143 PS; 141 bhp) and 120 kW (163 PS; 161 bhp) respectively. It is powered by a front-wheel drive system, and has a 5-speed manual transmission, with automatic only with the 2.4L. The Cowry has a kerb weight of 1510 kg. From 2013 appeared new 1.5L turbo engine

It offers double sliding middle doors, double sliding moon roofs as well as GPS navigation. The Cowry is available in three versions, Comfort, Luxury, and Super Luxury. It is priced between $15,500 to $19,400.
