= Haval M6 =

Compact crossover SUV produced by Great Wall Motor

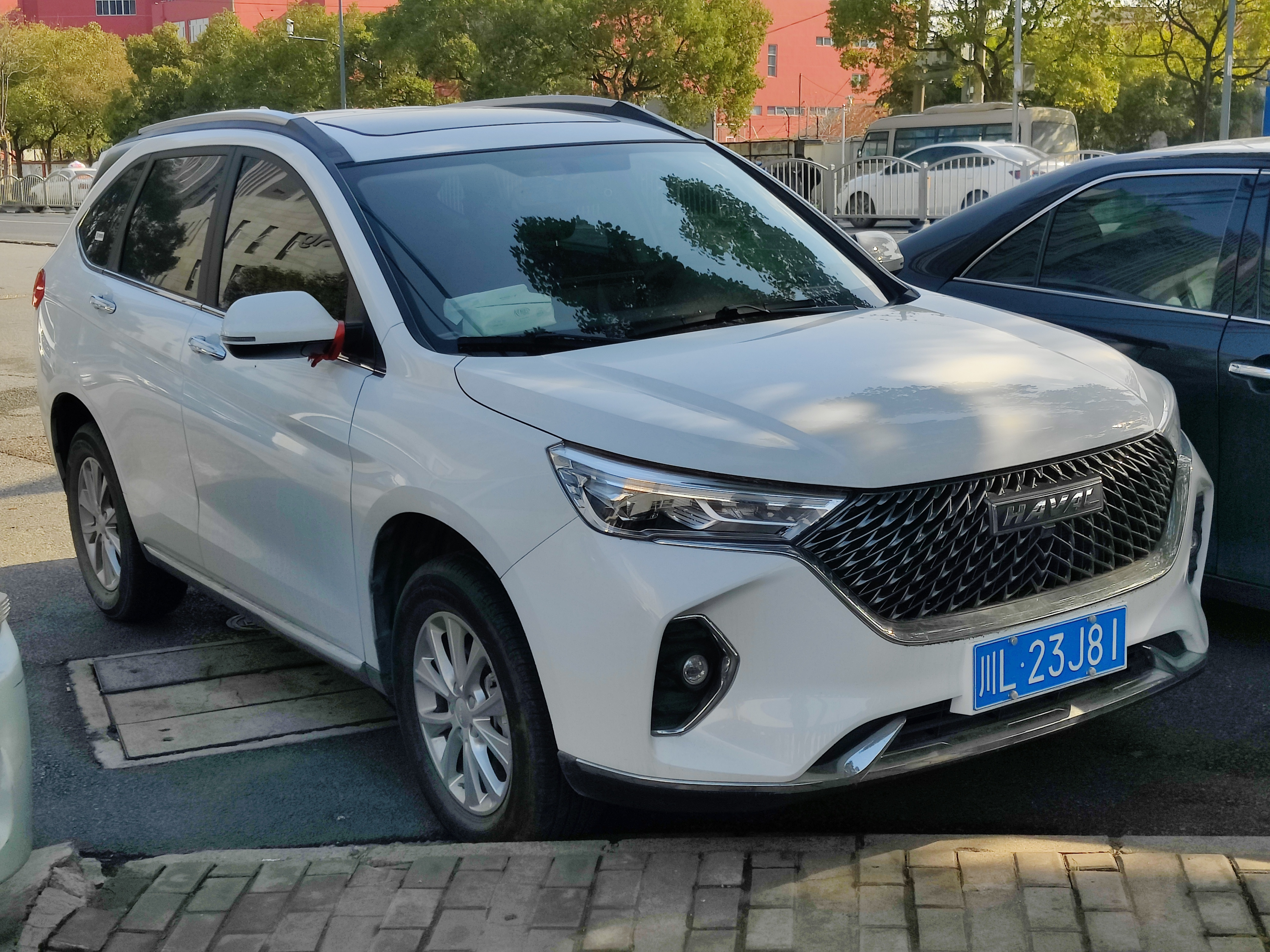
- 2021 Haval M6 Plus

Overview
- Manufacturer: Great Wall Motor
- Production: 2017–2025 (China); 2022–present (export)
- Model years: 2017–present
- Assembly: China: Tianjin

Body and chassis
- Class: Compact crossover SUV (C)
- Body style: 5-door SUV
- Layout: Front-engine, front-wheel-drive; Front-engine, four-wheel-drive
- Related: Haval H6

The Haval M6 is a compact crossover SUV produced by the Chinese manufacturer Great Wall Motor under the Haval sub-brand from 2017. The M6 shares the same platform and serves as a sporty variant of the first generation Haval H6, and a second generation model called the Haval M6 Plus was launched in 2021 while still riding on the same platform shared with the first generation Haval H6.

== First generation (2017, M6) ==
Haval M6
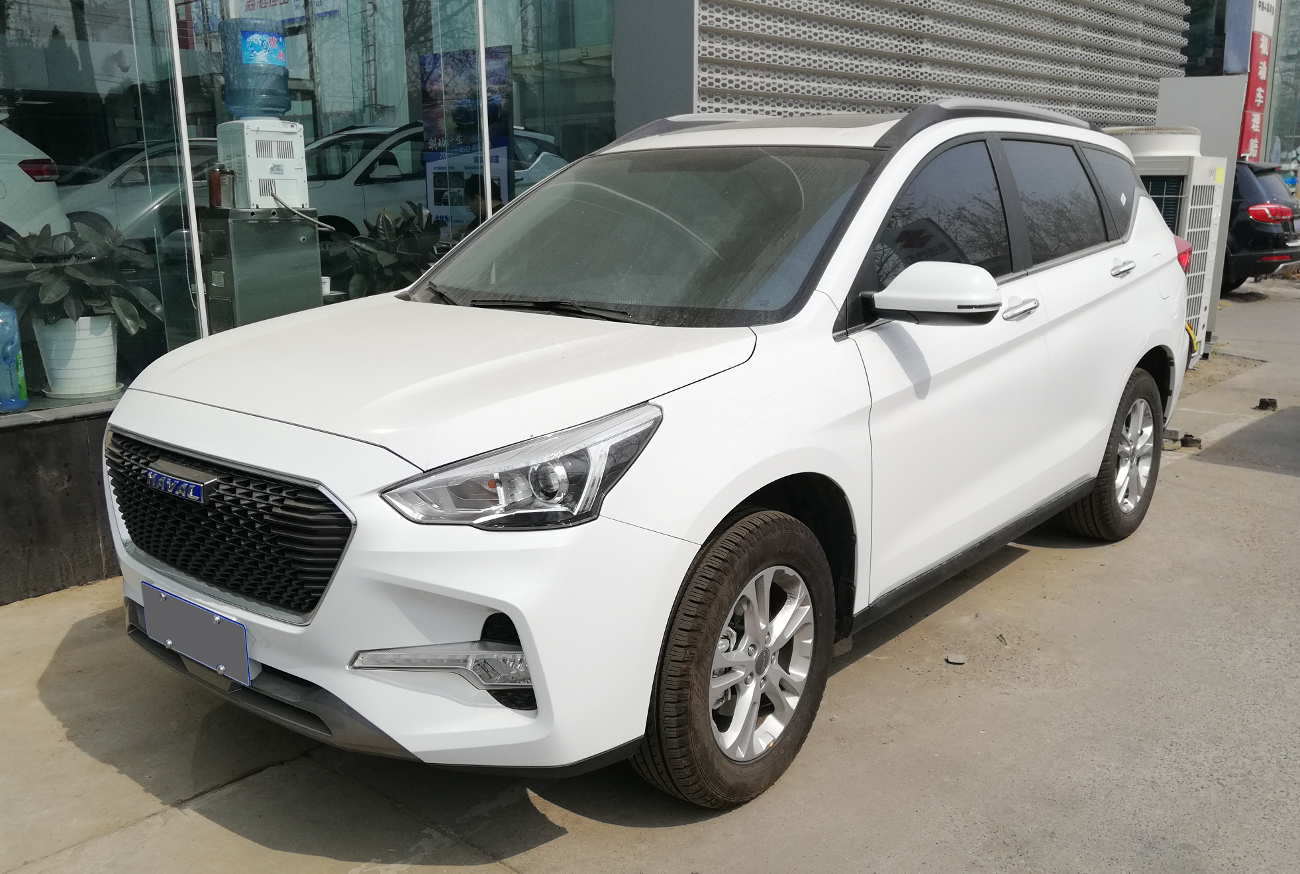

Overview
- Production: 2017–2021
- Model years: 2017–2021

Body and chassis
- Related: Haval H6 Coupe

Powertrain
- Engine: Petrol: 1.5 L 4G15 I4 turbo
- Transmission: 6-speed manual; 6-speed automatic; 7-speed dual-clutch

Dimensions
- Wheelbase: 2,680 mm (105.5 in)
- Length: 4,649 mm (183.0 in)
- Width: 1,830 mm (72.0 in)
- Height: 1,705 mm (67.1 in)

Chronology
- Predecessor: Haval H6 Sport

The M6 shares the same platform and serves as a sporty variant of the first generation Haval H6. Pricing starts from 89,800 yuan to 112,800 yuan.

The engine of the Haval M6 is the same as the first generation Haval H6 that it was based on which is a 1.5-liter turbo engine producing 110 kW (150 hp).

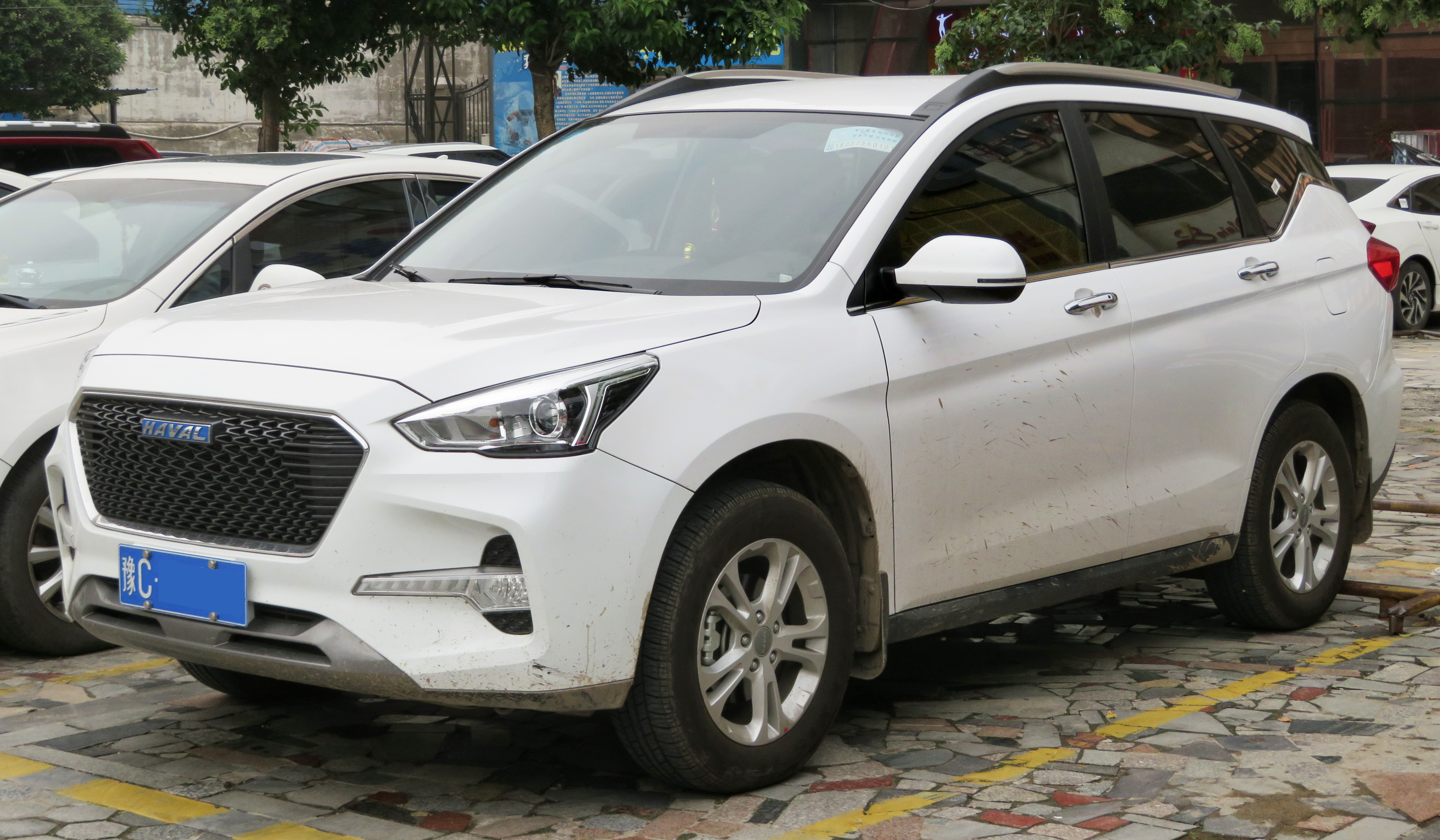
Haval M6 front

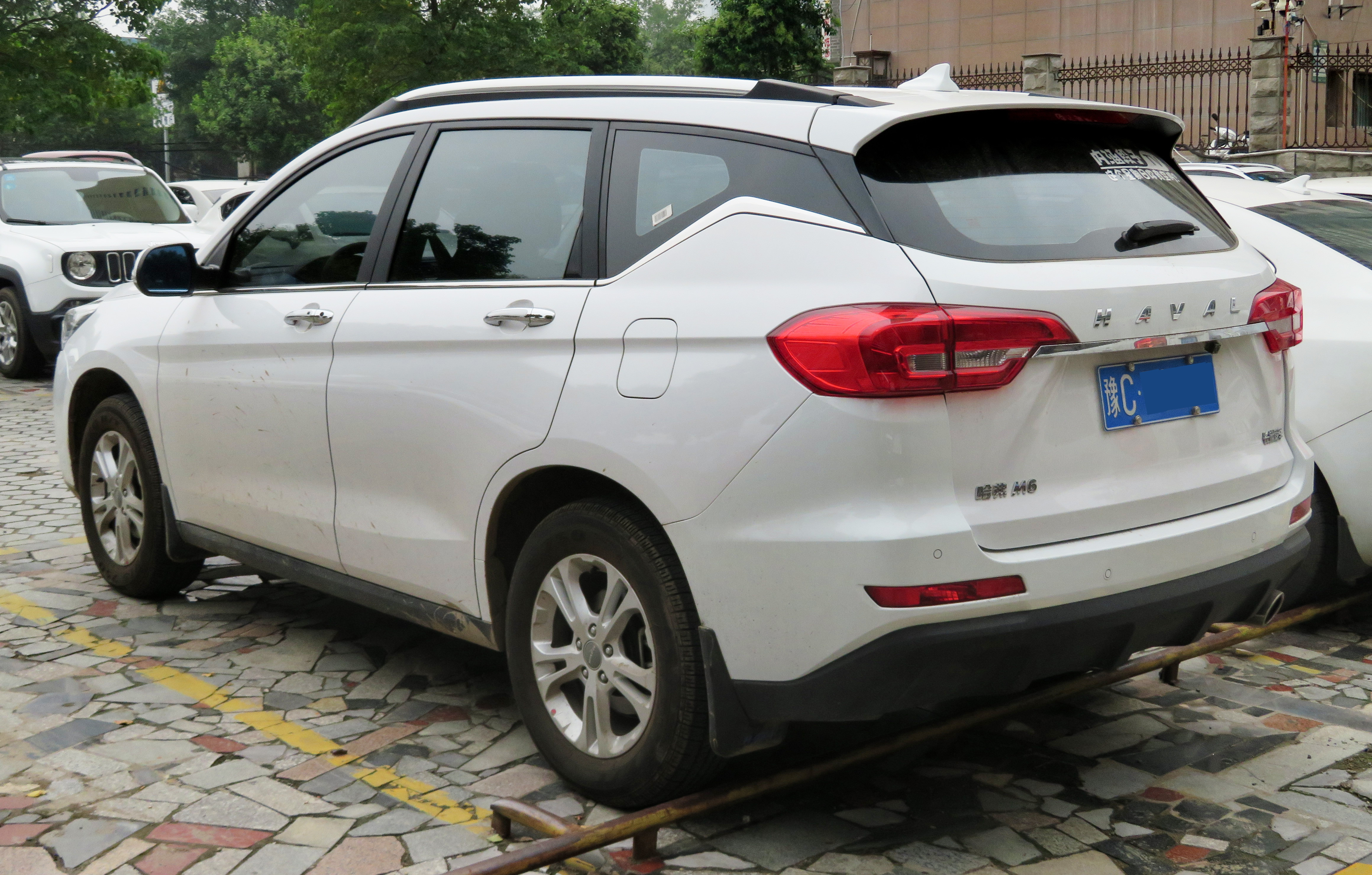
Haval M6 rear

=== 2019 facelift ===
A facelift for the 2019 model year Haval M6 was launched in June 2019 featuring a redesigned front end. The updated model wears the updated black Haval logo and fulfills the National V and VI emissions standard. The powertrain remains to be the same 1.5 liter turbo engine producing 110 kW (150 hp) and 210 N⋅m (155 lb⋅ft), with an addition of a 7-speed wet dual-clutch transmission added to the transmission options. The fuel economy is 6.8L/100km according to Haval officials.

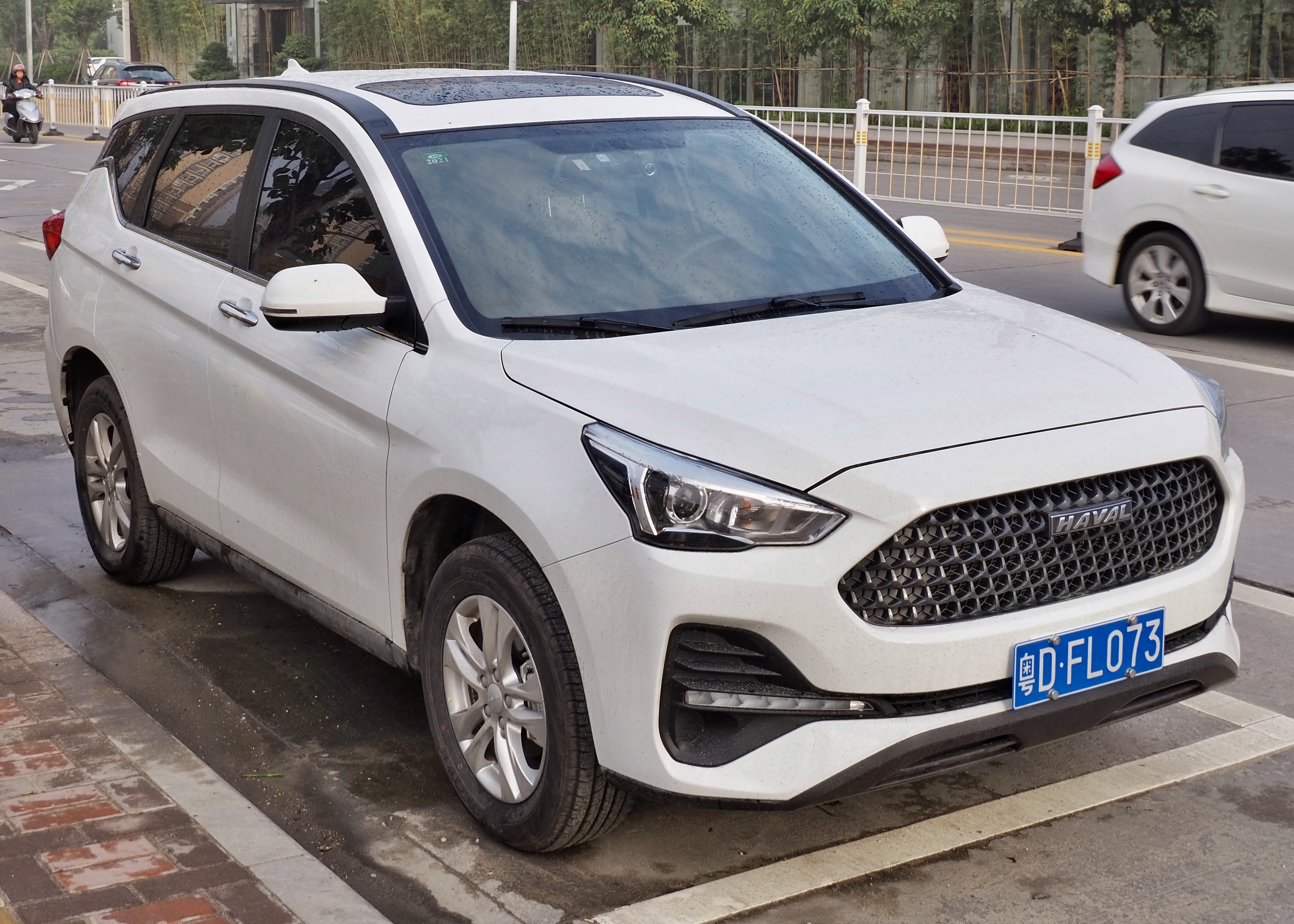
Haval M6 facelift

== Second generation (2021, M6 Plus) ==
Haval M6 Plus
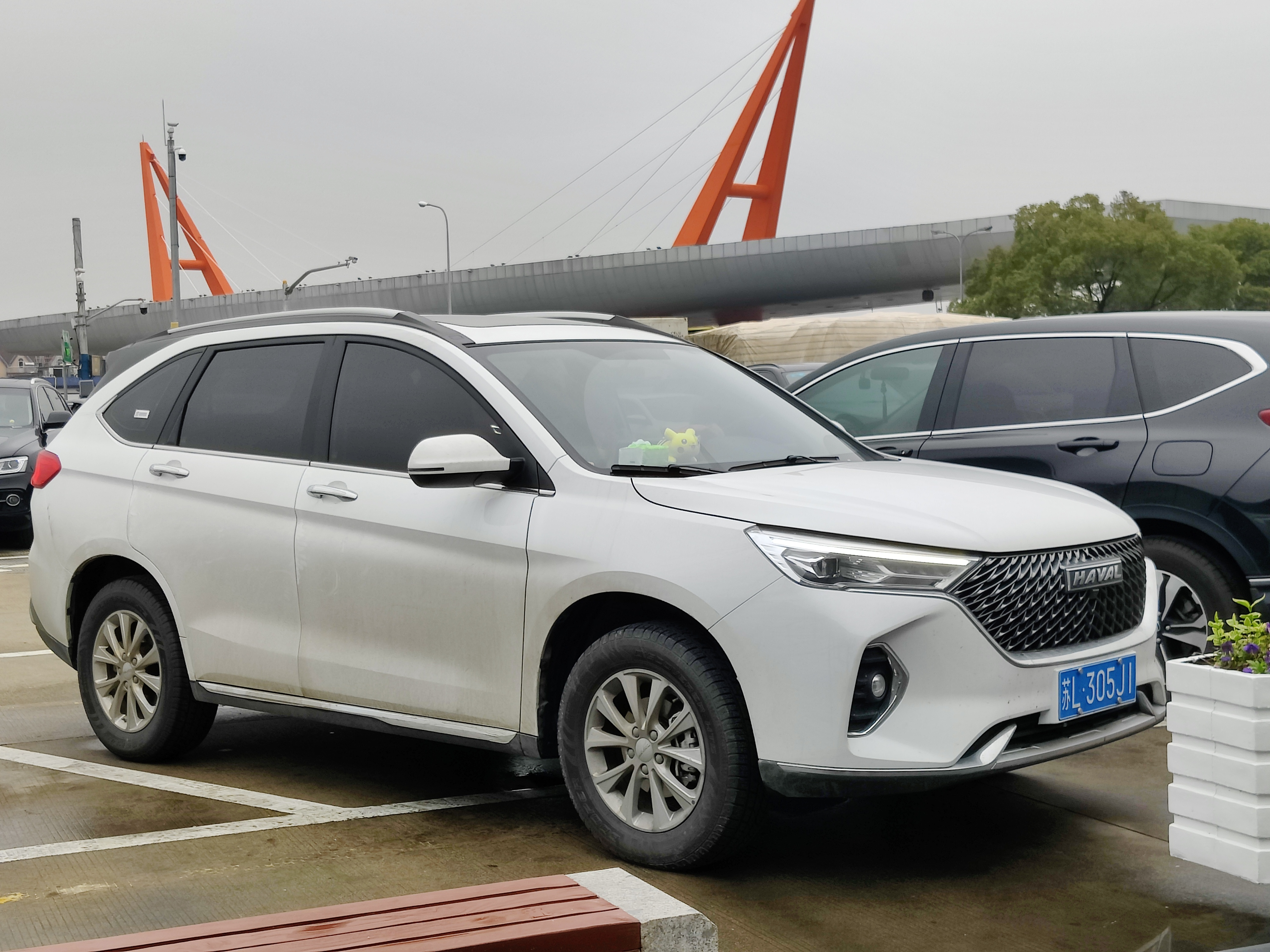

Overview
- Production: 2020–2025 (China); 2022–present (export)
- Model years: 2021–present

Powertrain
- Engine: Petrol: 1.5 L GW4G15F I4 turbo
- Transmission: 6-speed manual; 6-speed dual-clutch

Dimensions
- Wheelbase: 2,680 mm (105.5 in)
- Length: 4,664 mm (183.6 in)
- Width: 1,830 mm (72.0 in)
- Height: 1,729 mm (68.1 in)

Chronology
- Predecessor: Haval M6 (2017–2021)

The second generation Haval M6 was sold as the Haval M6 Plus in China from January 2021. The M6 Plus model received a complete makeover compared to the first generation model despite it still riding on the same platform as the first generation model. The interior of the M6 Plus is completely redesigned. The M6 Plus is powered by a 1.5-litre turbo engine codenamed GW4G15F producing a maximum output of 110 kW (150 hp) and 210 N⋅m (155 lb⋅ft). Transmission options include a 6-speed manual transmission and a 6-speed dual-clutch transmission.

The Haval M6 was officially launched in Russia and Kazakhstan in 2023. The car is offered with a 1.5-litre turbo engine rated at 107 kW (143 hp).

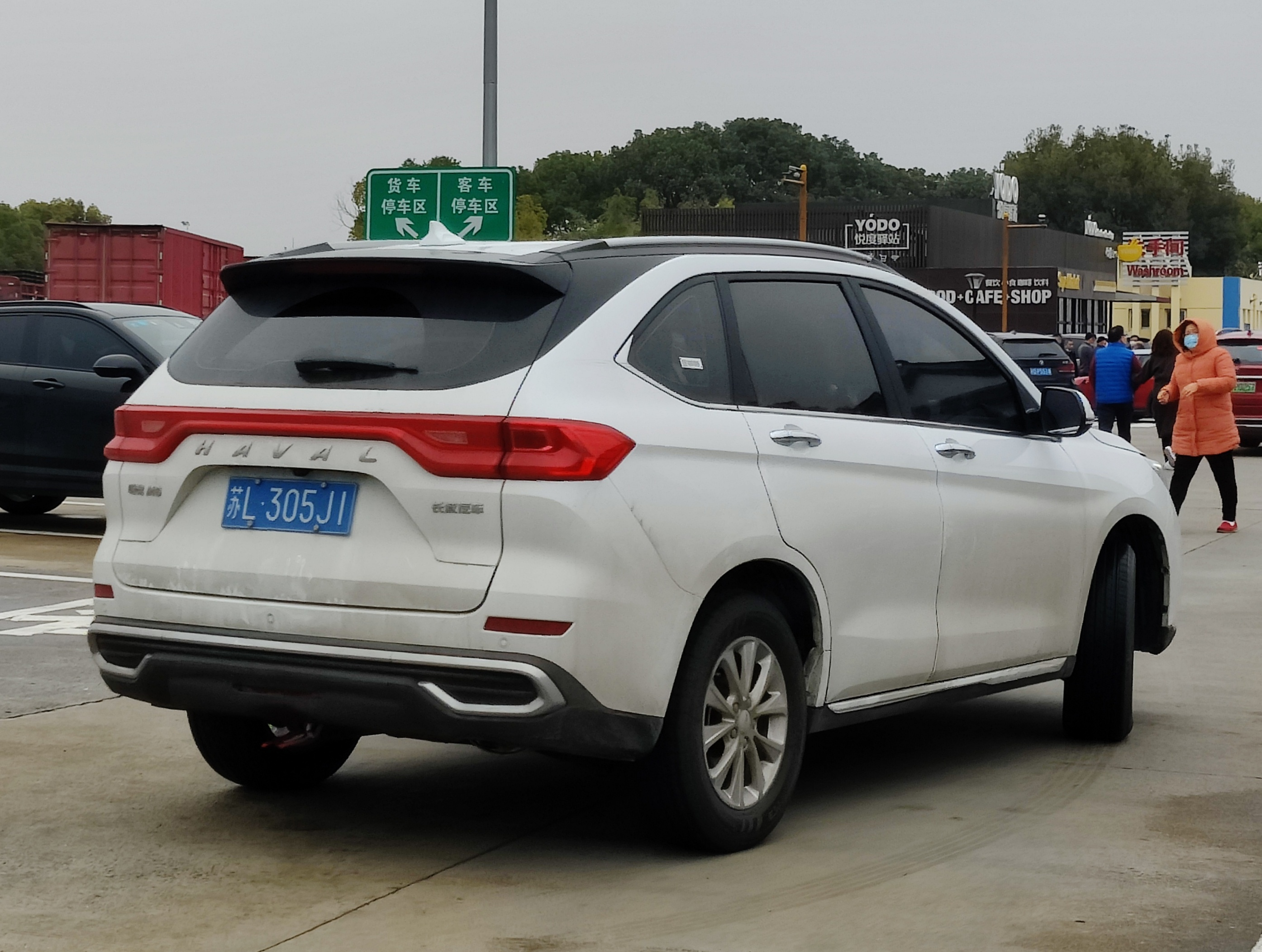
Haval M6 II rear

== Sales ==
Year	China
2023	58,451
2024	24,343
2025	2,580
