= List of Great Wall Motor vehicles =

This is a list of current and former automobiles produced by Chinese automaker Great Wall Motor, under its brands of Haval, Wey, Ora, Tank, and GWM Trucks.

== Current vehicles ==
=== Haval ===
Haval (Chinese: 哈弗; pinyin: Hāfú) is GWM's SUV brand. The Haval name was first used by the Great Wall Haval CUV (initially romanised as Hover, later renamed to Haval H3), which was introduced in April 2005. Haval was spun-off from a product line of GWM to a standalone brand in March 2013.

Image	Models	Chinese name	Export name	Introduction	Generation	Vehicle description
SUV
	H5	哈弗H5	-	2010	2nd	Full-size SUV
	H6	哈弗H6	-	2011	3rd	Compact SUV, ICE/PHEV/HEV
	H6L	哈弗H6L	-	2025	1st	Mid-size SUV, ICE variant of Xiaolong Max
	H9	哈弗H9	-	2014	2nd	Full-size SUV
	H10	长城H10	-	2026	1st	Full-size SUV, PHEV
	Big Dog Big Dog Plus	哈弗大狗 哈弗大狗PLUS	Haval Dargo Haval Dargo X Haval H7	2020	2nd	Compact SUV, ICE/PHEV
	Xiaolong Max	哈弗枭龙MAX	-	2023	1st	Mid-size SUV, ICE/PHEV
	Raptor	哈弗猛龙	Haval H7; Haval V7	2023	1st	Compact SUV, ICE/PHEV
	Raptor Plus	长城猛龙Plus	-	2026	1st	Mid-size SUV, PHEV

=== Haval (exported or built outside China only) ===
Image	Models	Chinese name	Export name	Introduction	Generation	Vehicle description
SUV
	Chitu	哈弗赤兔	Haval Jolion Pro/Hybrid	2021	1st	Compact SUV, ICE/PHEV, sales in the Chinese market ended in 2025, exports only.
	Shenshou	哈弗神兽	Haval F7/F7x	2021	1st	Compact SUV, ICE/PHEV, sales in the Chinese market ended in 2025, exports only.
	Cool Dog	哈弗酷狗	Haval H3	2022	1st	Compact SUV, ICE/PHEV, sales in the Chinese market ended in 2024, exports only.
	Xiaolong	哈弗枭龙	Haval Jolion Max	2023	1st	Compact SUV, PHEV, sales in the Chinese market ended in 2025, exports only.
	Jolion	哈弗初恋	-	2020	1st	Compact SUV, ICE/HEV, sales in the Chinese market ended in 2021, exports only.
	M6	哈弗M6	-	2017	2nd	Compact SUV, sales in the Chinese market ended in 2025, exports only.
	H6S	哈弗H6S	Haval H6 GT	2021	3rd	Compact coupe SUV, coupe variant of H6, sales in the Chinese market ended in 2024, exports only.

=== Wey ===
Wey (Chinese: 魏牌; pinyin: Wèipái) is GWM's luxury marque, focusing on SUVs and MPVs. Launched in 2017, it is named after GWM chairman Wei Jianjun.

Image	Models	Chinese name	Export name	Introduction	Generation	Vehicle description
SUV
	Lanshan	魏牌蓝山		2023	2nd	Full-size SUV, PHEV
	Mocha	魏牌摩卡	Wey Coffee 01; GWM Wey 05	2021	1st	Mid-size SUV, PHEV
	V8X	魏牌V8X		2026	1st	Mid-size SUV, PHEV/BEV
	V9X	魏牌V9X		2026	1st	Full-size SUV, PHEV/HEV/BEV
MPV
	Gaoshan	魏牌高山		2023	2nd	Full-size MPV, PHEV

=== Wey (exported or built outside China only) ===
Image	Models	Chinese name	Export name	Introduction	Generation	Vehicle description
SUV
	Latte	魏牌拿铁	GWM Wey 03	2021	1st	Compact SUV, PHEV, sales in the Chinese market ended in 2025, exports only.

=== Ora ===
Image	Models	Chinese name	Export name	Introduction	Generation	Vehicle description
Car
	Ballet Cat	欧拉芭蕾猫		2022	1st	Compact hatchback, BEV
	Good Cat	欧拉好猫	Ora Funky Cat; GWM Ora 03; GWM Ora	2020	1st	Compact hatchback, BEV
	Lightning Cat	欧拉闪电猫	GWM Ora 07	2022	1st	Mid-size sedan, BEV
Station wagon
	7	欧拉7		2026	1st	Mid-size wagon, BEV
SUV
	5	欧拉5	GWM Ora 5	2025	1st	Compact SUV, ICE/HEV/PHEV/BEV
	5 Wagon	欧拉5旅行	GWM Ora 5 Plus	2026	1st	Mid-size SUV, HEV/BEV

=== Tank ===
Tank (Chinese: 坦克; pinyin: Tǎnkè) is GWM's luxury off-road marque. Originally a sub-brand under Wey, the brand specialises in off-road oriented SUVs.

Image	Models	Chinese name	Introduction	Generation	Vehicle description
SUV
	300	坦克300	2020	2nd	Compact SUV, PHEV
	400	坦克400	2023	1st	Mid-size SUV, ICE/PHEV
	500	坦克500	2022	1st	Mid-size SUV, ICE/PHEV/HEV
	700	坦克700	2024	1st	Full-size SUV, PHEV

=== Great Wall/GWM Trucks ===
Image	Models	Chinese name	Export name	Introduction	Generation	Vehicle description
Pickup
	King Kong Cannon	长城金刚炮		2021	1st	Mid-size pickup
	Shanhai Cannon	长城山海炮	GWM Poer Sahar; GWM Cannon Alpha	2022	1st	Mid-size pickup
	Pao	长城炮	Poer P11/P12; GWM P-Series; GWM Ruman/Sucan; GWM Ute	2019	1st	Mid-size pickup
	Wingle 5	长城风骏5		2010	1st	Full-size pickup
	Wingle 7	长城风骏7		2018	1st	Mid-size pick-up

== Discontinued vehicles ==
=== Great Wall/GWM Trucks ===
Image	Models	Chinese name	Introduction (cal. year)	Discontinued (cal. year)	Generation	Vehicle description
Car
	Peri	长城精灵	2007	2010	1st	City car
	Voleex C20R Voleex C10/Great Wall Phenom	长城腾翼C20R 长城凌傲	2010	2014	1st	Subcompact car
	Coolbear	长城酷熊	2009	2015	1st	Subcompact car
	Florid	长城炫丽	2008	2013	1st	Subcompact car
	Voleex C30/C30	长城腾翼C30/长城C30	2010	2016	1st	Subcompact sedan
	Voleex C50/C50	长城腾翼C50/长城C50	2012	2016	1st	Compact sedan
SUV
	Haval M1	长城哈弗M1	2007	2010	1st	Mini SUV, variant of Peri
	Haval M2	长城哈弗M2	2010	2015	1st	Subcompact SUV, variant of Coolber
	Haval M4	长城哈弗M4	2012	2013	1st	Subcompact SUV, variant of Florid
	Hover/Haval H3	长城哈弗CUV/哈弗H3	2005	2012	1st	Compact SUV
	Pegasus	长城赛骏	2003	2008	1st	Compact SUV, variant of SoCool
	Safe	长城赛弗	2002	2009	1st	Compact SUV, variant of Deer
	Sing	长城赛影	2005	2008	1st	Full-size SUV, variant of Sailor
MPV
	Cowry/Voleex V80	长城嘉誉/腾翼V80	2007	2015	1st	Compact MPV
Pickup
	Deer	长城迪尔	1996	2013	1st	Compact/mid-size/full-size pickup
	SoCool	长城賽酷	2003	2010	1st	Compact pickup
	Sailor	长城賽鈴	2001	2010	1st	Full-size pickup
	Wingle 3	长城风骏3	2006	2010	1st	Full-size pickup
	Wingle 6	长城风骏6	2014	2021	1st	Full-size pickup

=== Haval ===
Image	Models	Chinese name	Introduction (cal. year)	Discontinued (cal. year)	Generation	Vehicle description
SUV
	F5	哈弗F5	2018	2020	2nd	Compact coupe SUV
	F7 F7X	哈弗F7 哈弗F7X	2018	2024	1st	Compact SUV Coupe SUV variant
	H1	哈弗H1	2013	2021	2nd	Subcompact SUV
	H2	哈弗H2	2014	2021	1st	Subcompact SUV
	H2s	哈弗H2s	2016	2019	1st	Subcompact SUV
	H4	哈弗H4	2017	2020	1st	Compact SUV
	H6 Coupe	哈弗H6 Coupe	2015	2021	Succeeded by H6 GT as 3rd generation currently	Compact coupe SUV
	H7	哈弗H7	2015	2021	1st	Mid-size SUV
	H8	哈弗H8	2013	2018	1st	Mid-size SUV

=== Wey ===
Image	Models	Chinese name	Introduction (cal. year)	Discontinued (cal. year)	Generation	Vehicle description
SUV
	Macchiato	魏牌玛奇朵	2021	2023	1st	Compact SUV, ICE/PHEV
	VV5	魏牌VV5	2017	2021	1st	Compact SUV
	VV6	魏牌VV6	2018	2021	1st	Compact SUV
	VV7 VV7 GT P8	魏牌VV7 魏牌VV7 GT 魏牌P8	2017 2017 2018	2021 2021 2020	1st	Mid-size SUV Coupe SUV variant PHEV variant

=== Ora ===
Image	Models	Chinese name	Introduction (cal. year)	Discontinued (cal. year)	Generation	Vehicle description
Car
	Mecha Dragon	机甲龙	2022	2024	1st	Full-size sedan, BEV
	R1/Black Cat	欧拉黑猫	2019	2022	1st	City car, BEV
	R2/White Cat	欧拉白猫	2020	2022	1st	City car, BEV
	iQ	欧拉iQ	2018	2020	1st	Compact car, BEV
