= Haval H7 =

Mid-size crossover SUV

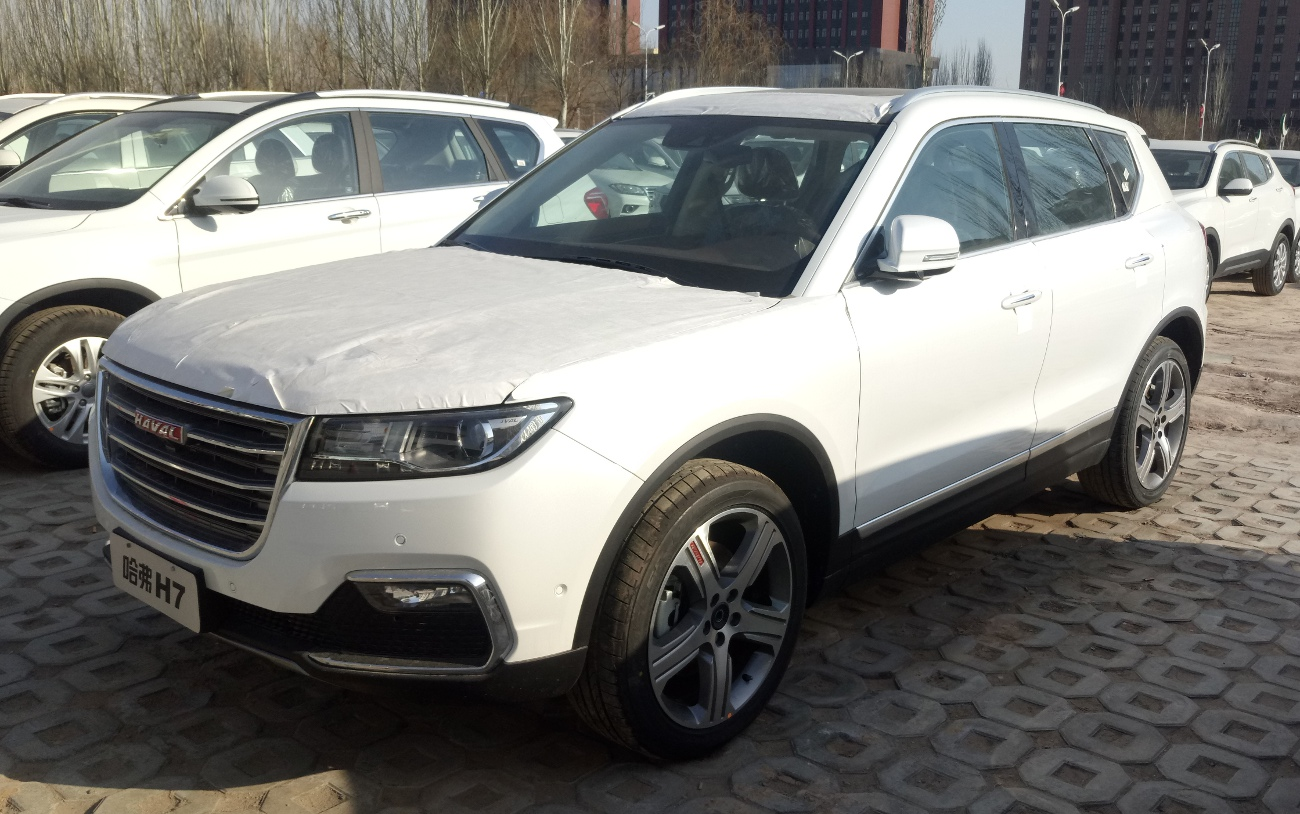
- Haval H7 Red Label

Overview
- Type: SUV
- Manufacturer: Haval (Great Wall Motor)
- Model code: CHB041 (2016-2017 H7); CHB042 (2018 H7); CHB071 (H7L)
- Also called: Great Wall Haval H7
- Production: 2015–2021 (China); 2023–present (Middle East, Asia-Pacific); 2025–present (South Africa & Australia)
- Model years: 2015–2021
- Assembly: Tianjin, China

Body and chassis
- Class: Compact SUV (H7); Mid-size SUV (H7L)
- Body style: 5-door wagon
- Layout: Front-engine, front-wheel-drive
- Related: Haval H7L

Powertrain
- Engine: 2.0 L GW4C20A used in model year 2016-2018 I4 (turbo petrol) 2.0 L GW4C20B used in model year 2019-2021 I4 (turbo petrol)
- Power output: 170 kW (231 HP) with GW4C20A models; 168 kW (227 HP) with GW4C20B models
- Transmission: 6-speed DCT used in model year 2016-2018; 7-speed DCT used in model year 2019-2021

Dimensions
- Wheelbase: 2,850 mm (112.2 in)
- Length: 4,715 mm (185.6 in) (H7); 4,900 mm (192.9 in) (H7L)
- Width: 1,925 mm (75.8 in)
- Height: 1,718 mm (67.6 in) (H7); 1,785 mm (70.3 in) (H7L)
- Curb weight: 1978 Kg (H7); 2108 Kg (H7L)

Chronology
- Successor: Haval Big Dog; Haval Raptor

The Haval H7 is a mid-size crossover SUV by Haval that was launched on the Chinese car market in early 2016. The first generation model, which was in production since 2016, was discontinued in 2021.

Since then, the H7 name was discontinued in Chinese market. Though the H7 name was used in several models as declaration name in application submitted to the Ministry of Industry and Information Technology of China, it was never used as a dedicated model name again. It's spiritual successor in Chinese market is Haval Big Dog.

== Origins ==
The Haval H7 was first revealed to the Chinese market on Nov 23, 2015 at Guangzhou Auto Show. Debuted with blue badge variants only, the H7 SUV was originally ment to fill the gap between the brand's hot-selling H6 and luxury-positioned H8, as a "high quality mid-sized SUV". The official annoucement of the HAVAL H7 came on April 2016 on beijing auto show, with three different trim and a starting price of RMB 149.8k.

Later at 2017 model year, HAVAL introduced new red label variant and the new H7L variant to the H7 family, as the red label symbolise a more sporty styling and the H7L provides a 7-seater choice in this market segment.

At the time of launch, The Haval H7 and Haval H7L came with 2.0-liter petrol turbocharged straight-four engine,code name GW4C20A. It produces 170 kW (230 hp) and 355 N⋅m (262 lb⋅ft). It is paired with a 6DCT451 six-speed dual-clutch transmission from Getrag.

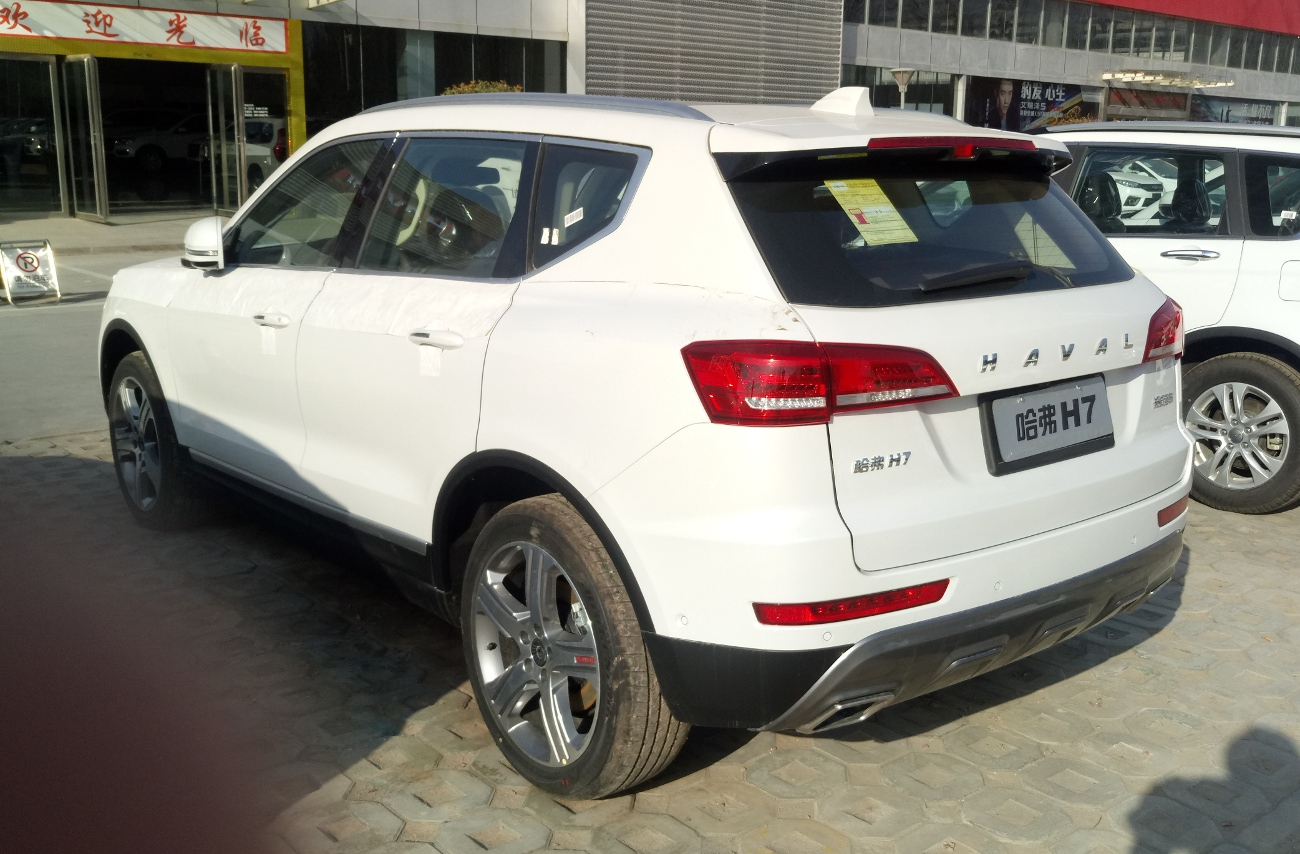
2017 Haval H7 Red Label (rear)

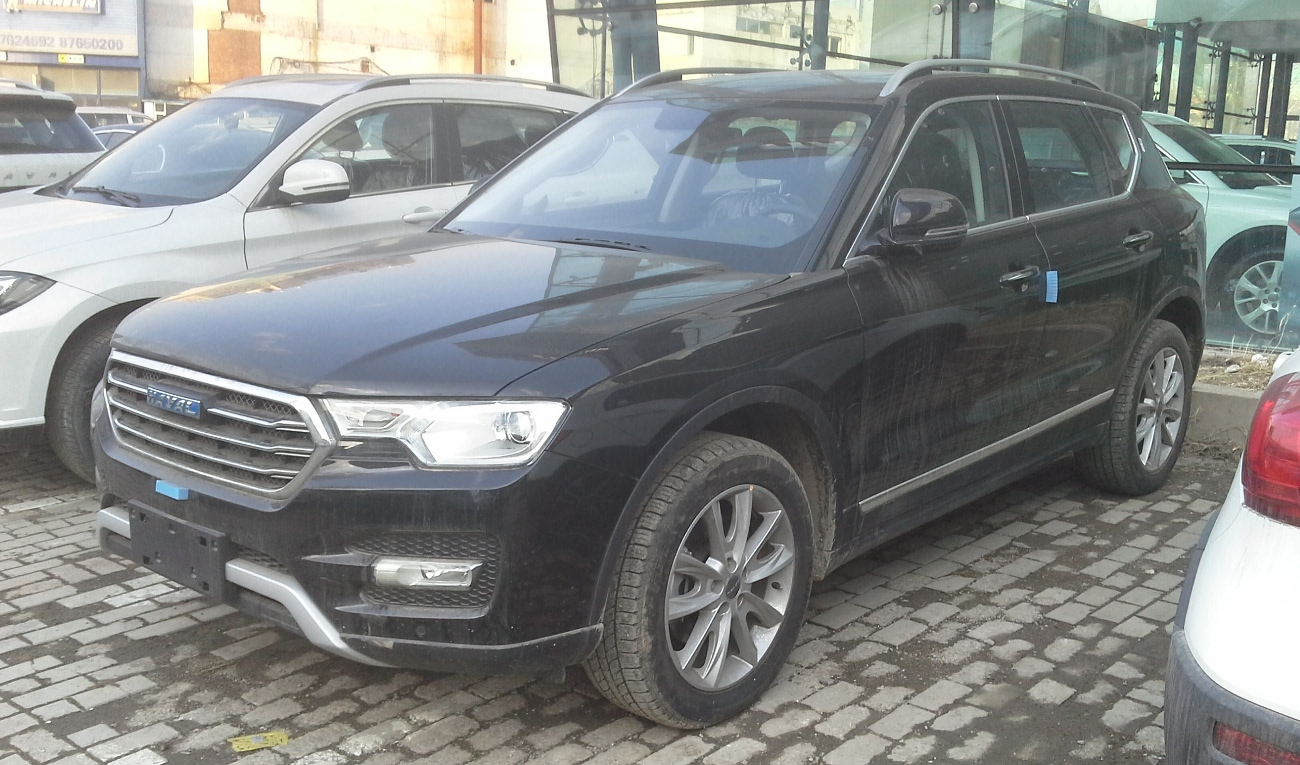
2016-17 Haval H7 Blue Label (front)

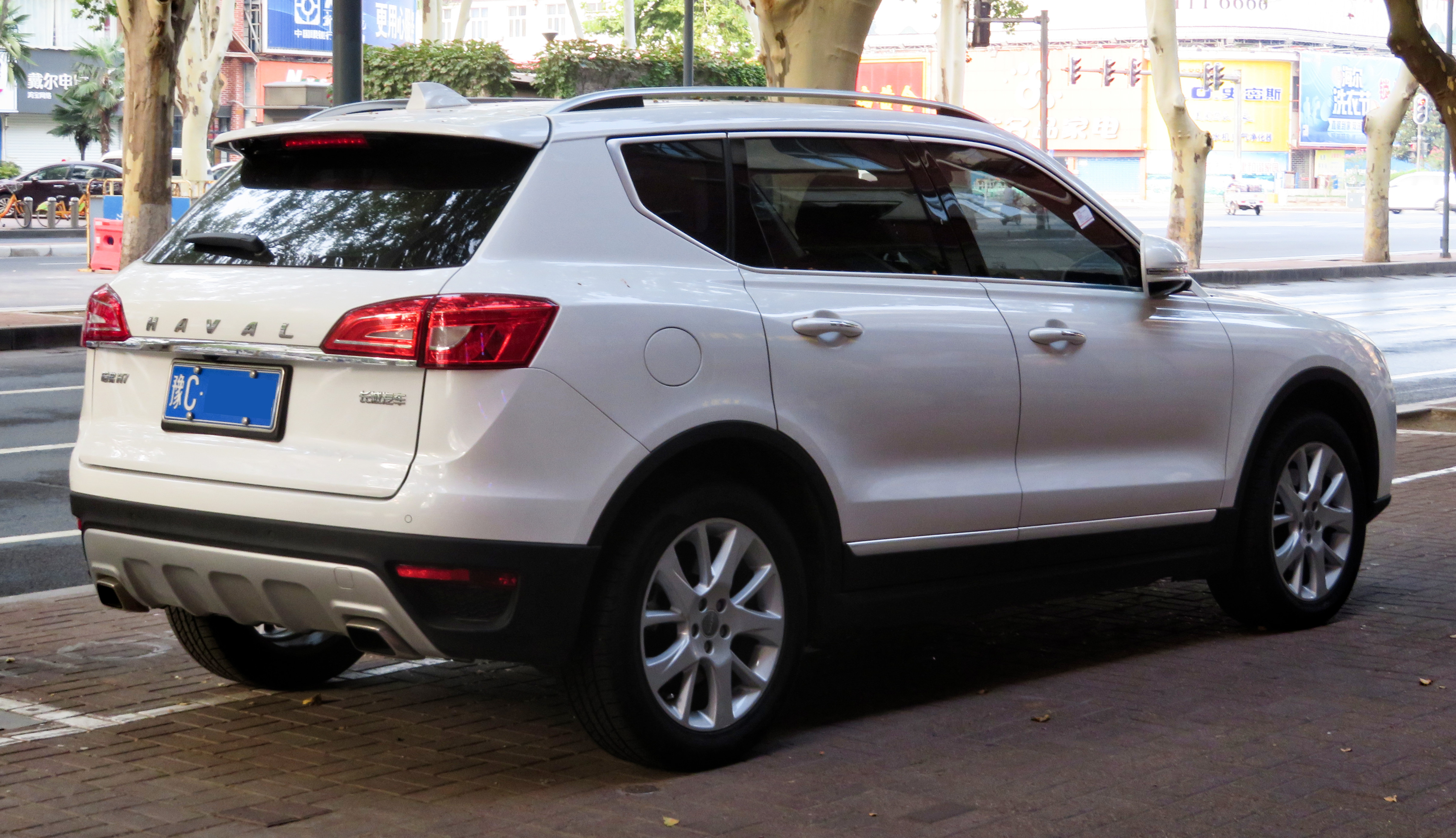
2016-17 Haval H7 Blue Label (rear)

== Global Market ==
=== Australian market ===
The Australian market Haval H7 debuted in the first quarter of 2018. While the Haval H7 was unveiled in five-seat H7 and seven-seat H7L (Long) models for the domestic Chinese market. Only the seven-seat version called H7 is offered in Australia, losing the "Long" moniker for the Australian market. Only the front-wheel drive version of the Haval H7 is available in Australia. The top-of-the-line LUX trim of the H7 is fully loaded with features including a panoramic sunroof, automatic tailgate, 12.3-inch instrument panel display, and semi-autonomous parking.

Safety features of the Haval H7 for the Australian market include blind-spot monitors, lane-changing assist, rear cross-traffic alert sensors, autonomous emergency braking, forward collision warning, and a 360-degree camera.

Wheels offered for the H7 include either 19- or 20-inch alloys, depending on the trim levels. The H7 is also running 235/55 R19 or 255/45 R20 tires.

=== Haval H7L ===
A seven-seater mid-size Haval H7L was also available in Red Label trim shortly after, with almost 200 mm (7.9 in) of extra length.

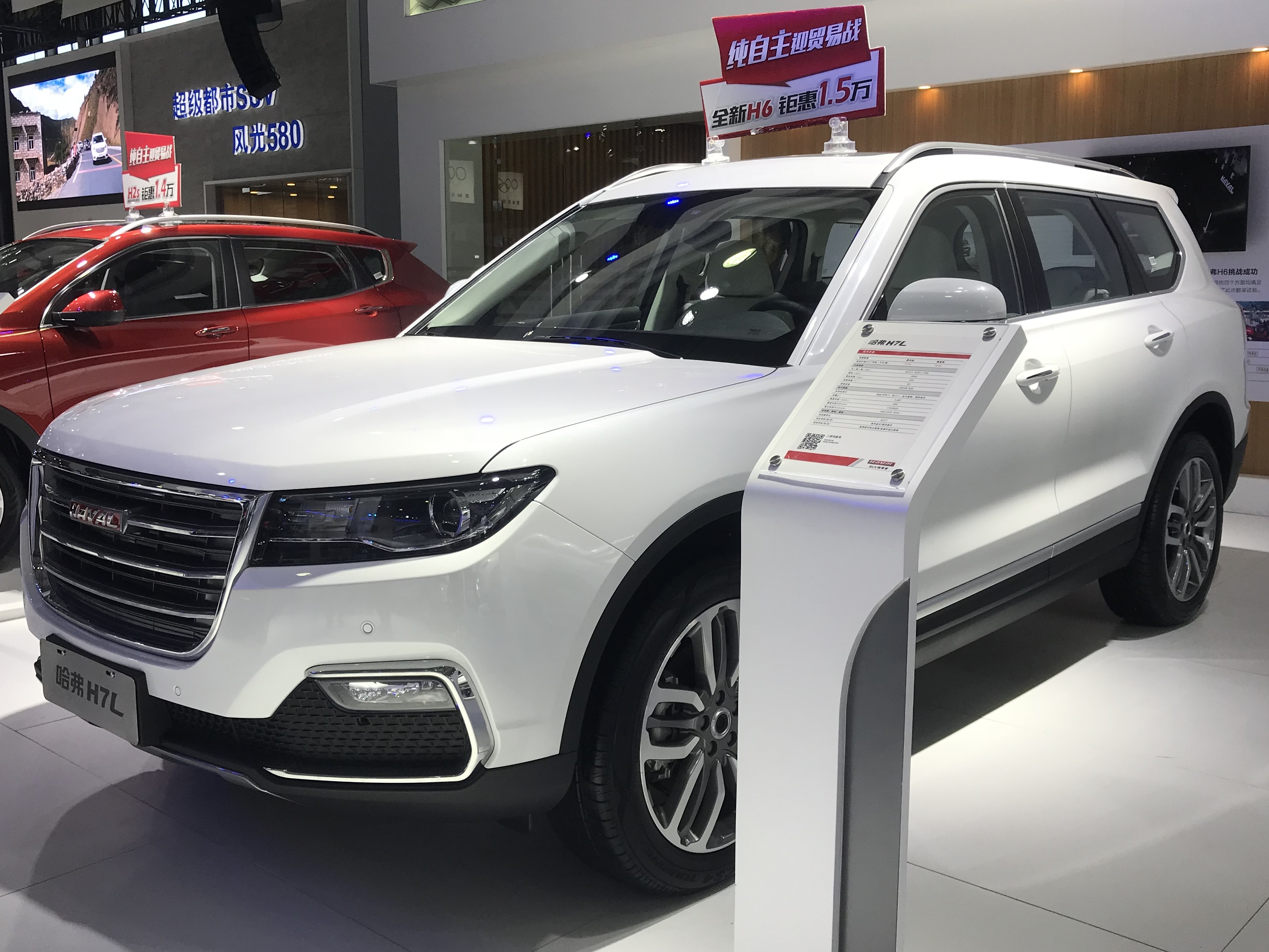
Haval H7L Red Label front

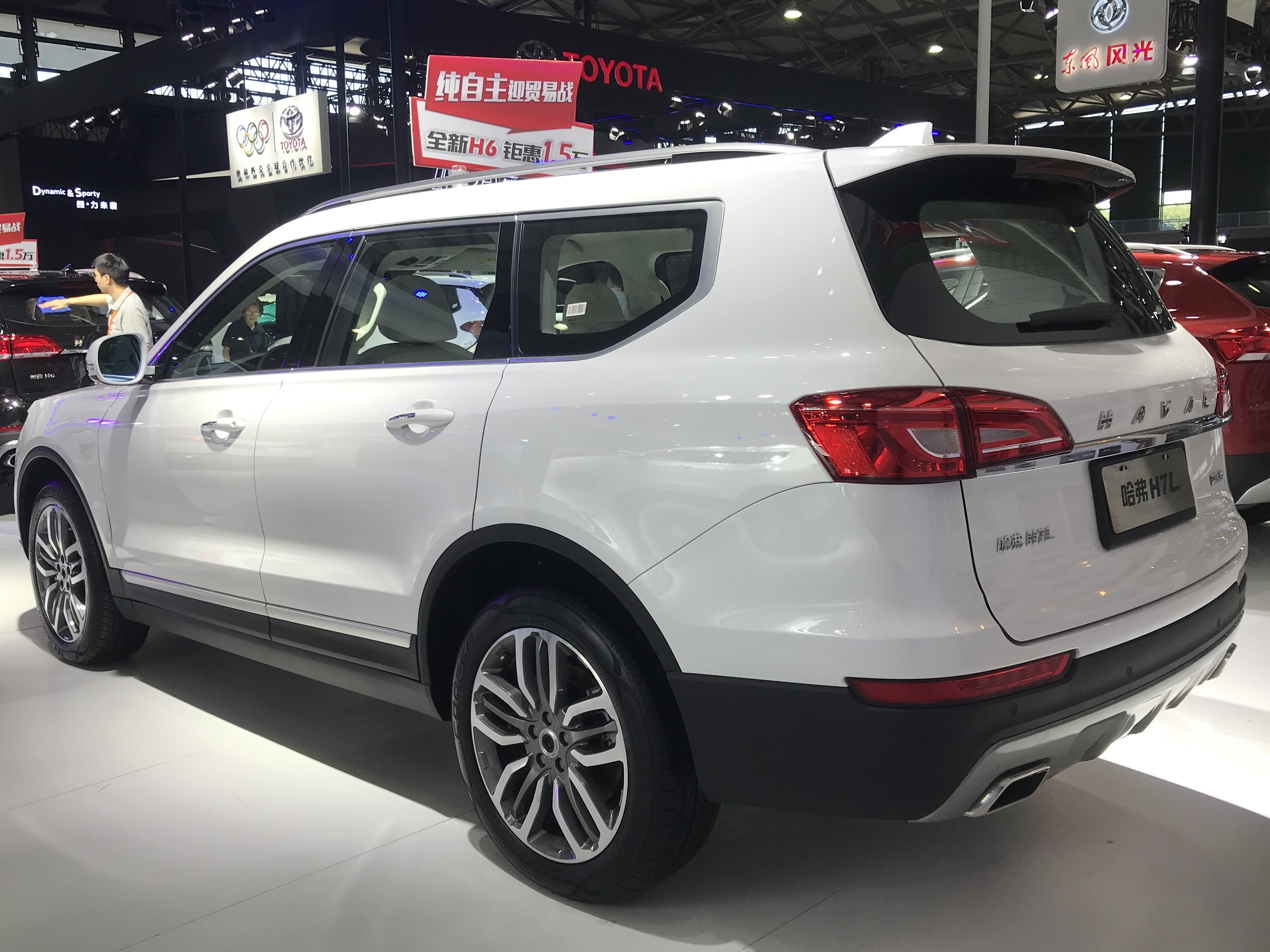
Haval H7L Red Label rear

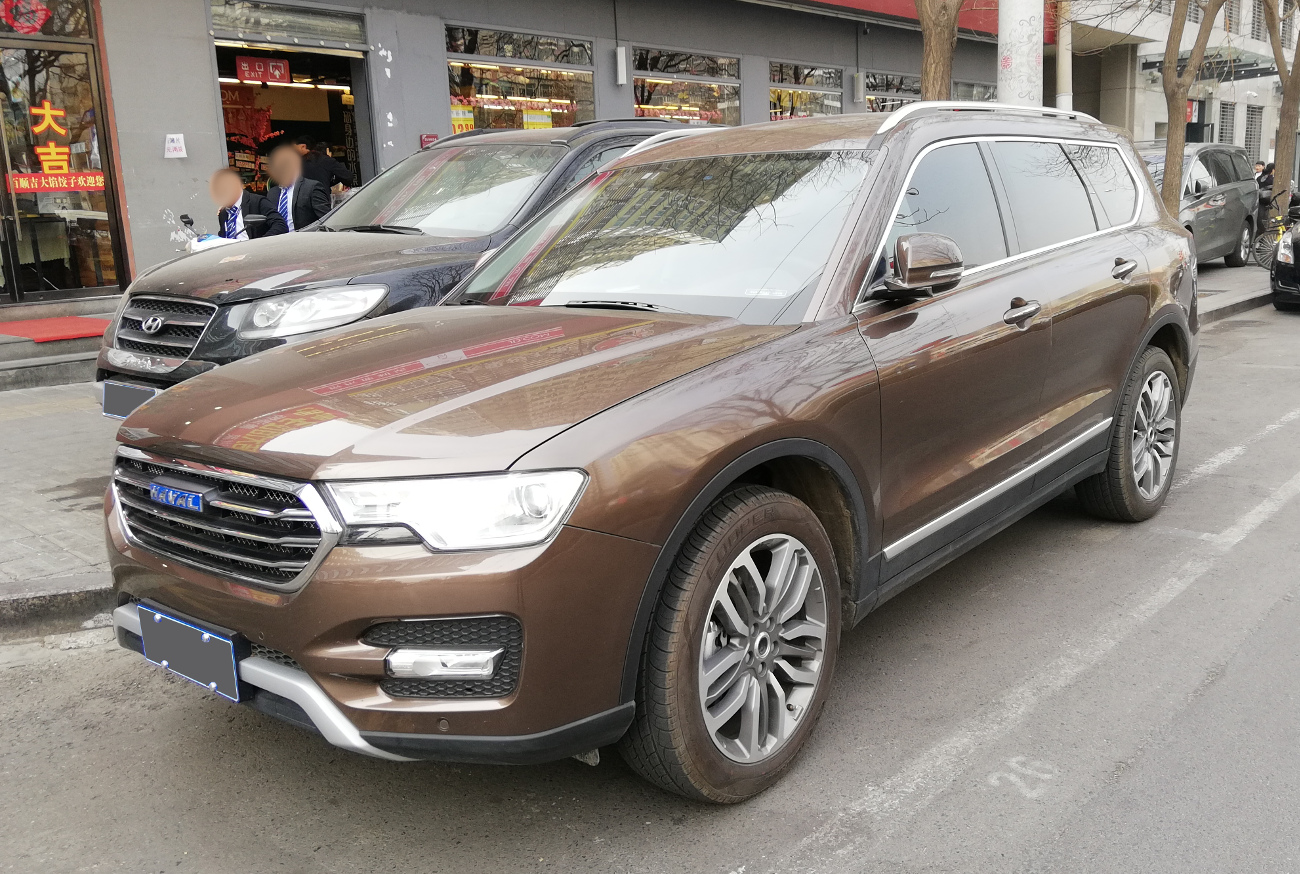
Haval H7L Blue Label front

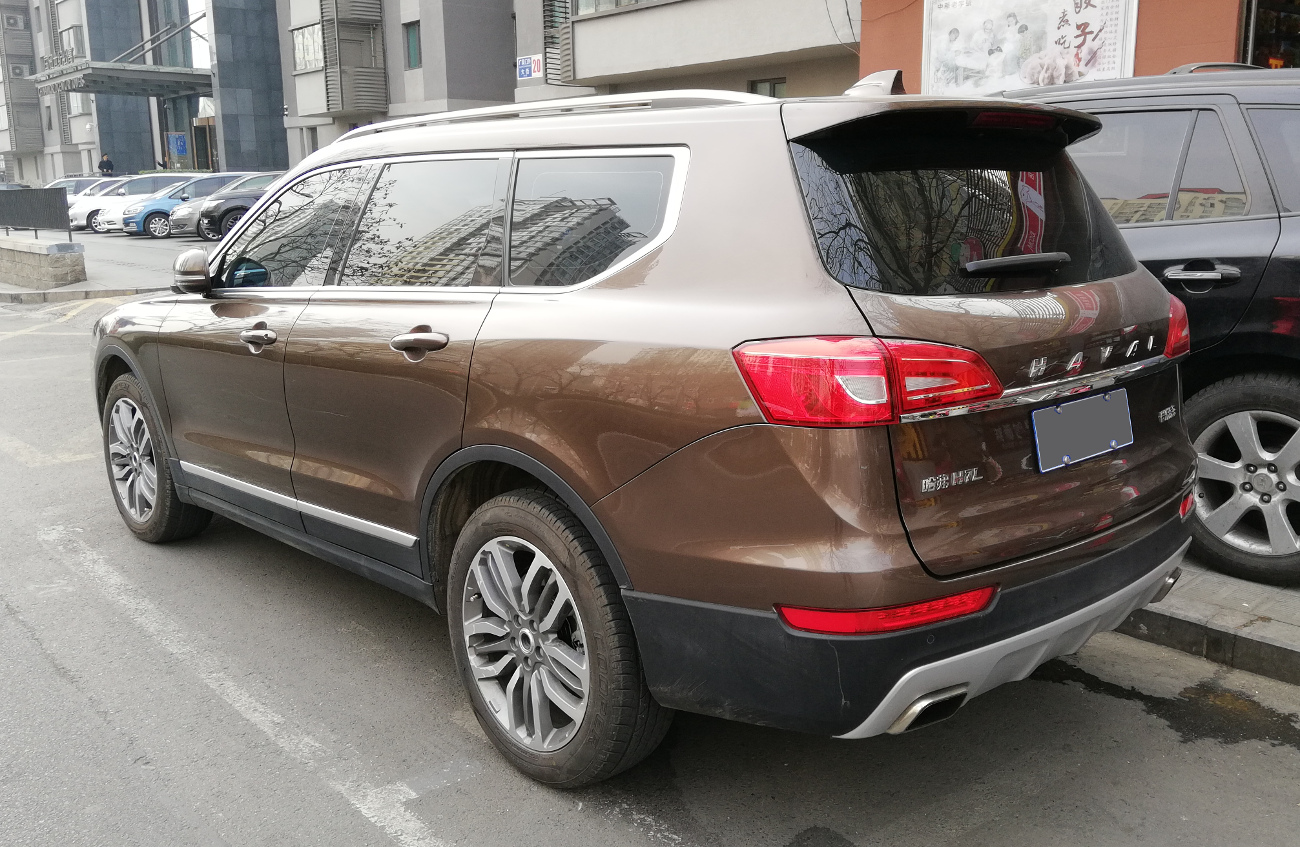
Haval H7L Blue Label rear

== Second generation ==
News of the second generation H7 model surfaced in October 2024 with the model being now heavily based on the Haval Xiaolong Max.
