= Haval Xiaolong =

Plug-in hybrid compact crossover SUV

Overview
- Manufacturer: Haval
- Also called: Haval Jolion Max (export)
- Production: 2023–2025 (China); 2026–present (export)
- Assembly: China: Tianjin

Body and chassis
- Class: Compact crossover SUV
- Body style: 5-door SUV
- Layout: Front-engine, front-wheel-drive or four-wheel-drive
- Related: Haval Xiaolong Max

Powertrain
- Engine: Petrol plug-in hybrid: 1.5 L GW4G15H I4
- Electric motor: BorgWarner DHT115 permanent magnet synchronous motor
- Power output: Engine: 74 kW (99 bhp; 101 PS) & 132 N⋅m (97 lb⋅ft; 13 kg⋅m); Electric motor: 115 kW (154 bhp; 156 PS) & 250 N⋅m (184 lb⋅ft; 25 kg⋅m); Combined: 185 kW (248 bhp; 252 PS) & 375 N⋅m (277 lb⋅ft; 38 kg⋅m)
- Transmission: 2-speed DHT
- Hybrid drivetrain: Power-split Hybrid; Plug-in hybrid
- Battery: 9.4 or 19.27 kWh (33.8 or 69.4 MJ)

Dimensions
- Wheelbase: 2,710 mm (106.7 in)
- Length: 4,600 mm (181.1 in)
- Width: 1,877 mm (73.9 in)
- Height: 1,675 mm (65.9 in)
- Curb weight: 1,740–1,810 kg (3,836–3,990 lb)

The Haval Xiaolong (Chinese: 哈弗枭龙) is a plug-in hybrid compact crossover SUV produced by Great Wall Motor under the Haval brand.

== Overview ==
Rear view

Originally codenamed A07 during development, the Xiaolong was launched in March 2023.

== Powertrain ==
The Xiaolong is only available with a naturally aspirated 1.5-litre four-cylinder plug-in hybrid powertrain and mated to a 2-speed dedicated hybrid transmission (DHT). It is available with a choice of 9.41 or 19.27 kWh (33.9 or 69.4 MJ) battery packs with claimed WLTP pure electric range of 44 or 86 kilometres (27 or 53 mi) (52 or 110 kilometres (32 or 68 mi) in NEDC), respectively. The fuel consumption of the Haval Xiaolong is 5.3 L/100 km (18.9 km/L; 53.3 mpg_{‑imp}; 44.4 mpg_{‑US}).

== Sales ==
Year	China
2023	1,419
2024	2,342
2025	1
