= Haval H9 =

Full-size SUV made by Great Wall Motor

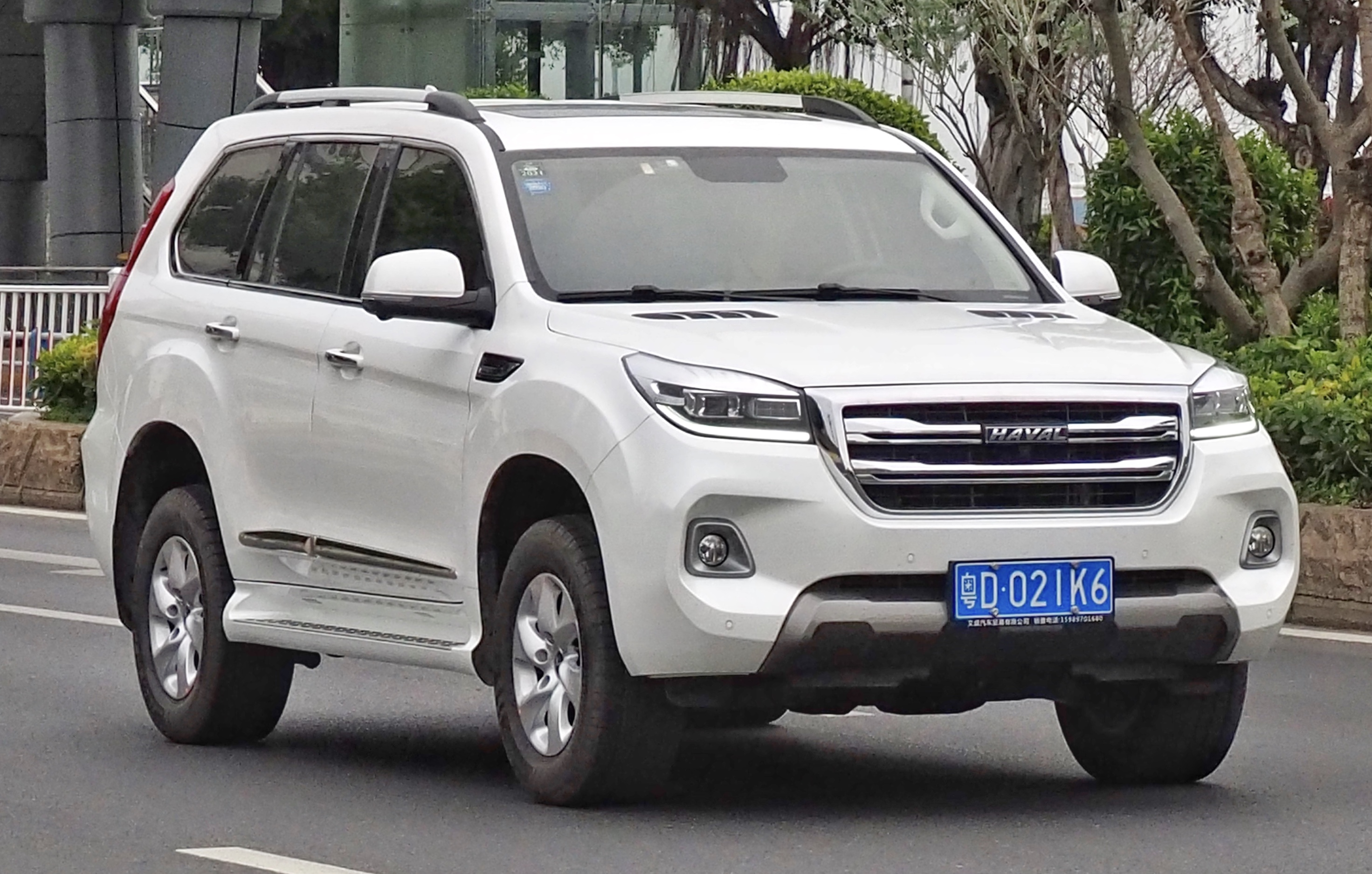
- First generation Haval H9 facelift

Overview
- Manufacturer: Great Wall Motor
- Production: 2014–present

Body and chassis
- Class: Full-size SUV
- Layout: Front-engine, four-wheel-drive
- Chassis: Body-on-frame

Chronology
- Predecessor: Haval H8
- Successor: Haval H10

The Haval H9 is a four-wheel drive vehicle produced by the Chinese automobile manufacturer Great Wall Motor under the Haval brand. It was first launched in 2014 with the second generation being introduced in early 2024.

At the time of its introduction, the Haval H9 is the largest vehicle ever developed by Great Wall Motors with the drivetrain being a new all-wheel drive system, and is the second brand new SUV with a body-on-frame chassis developed by Haval, following the Haval H3 and Haval H5. It competes with the likes of the Toyota Land Cruiser Prado and Mitsubishi Pajero. The H9 is available in both 5-seater and 7-seater configurations.

== First generation (2014) ==
First generation
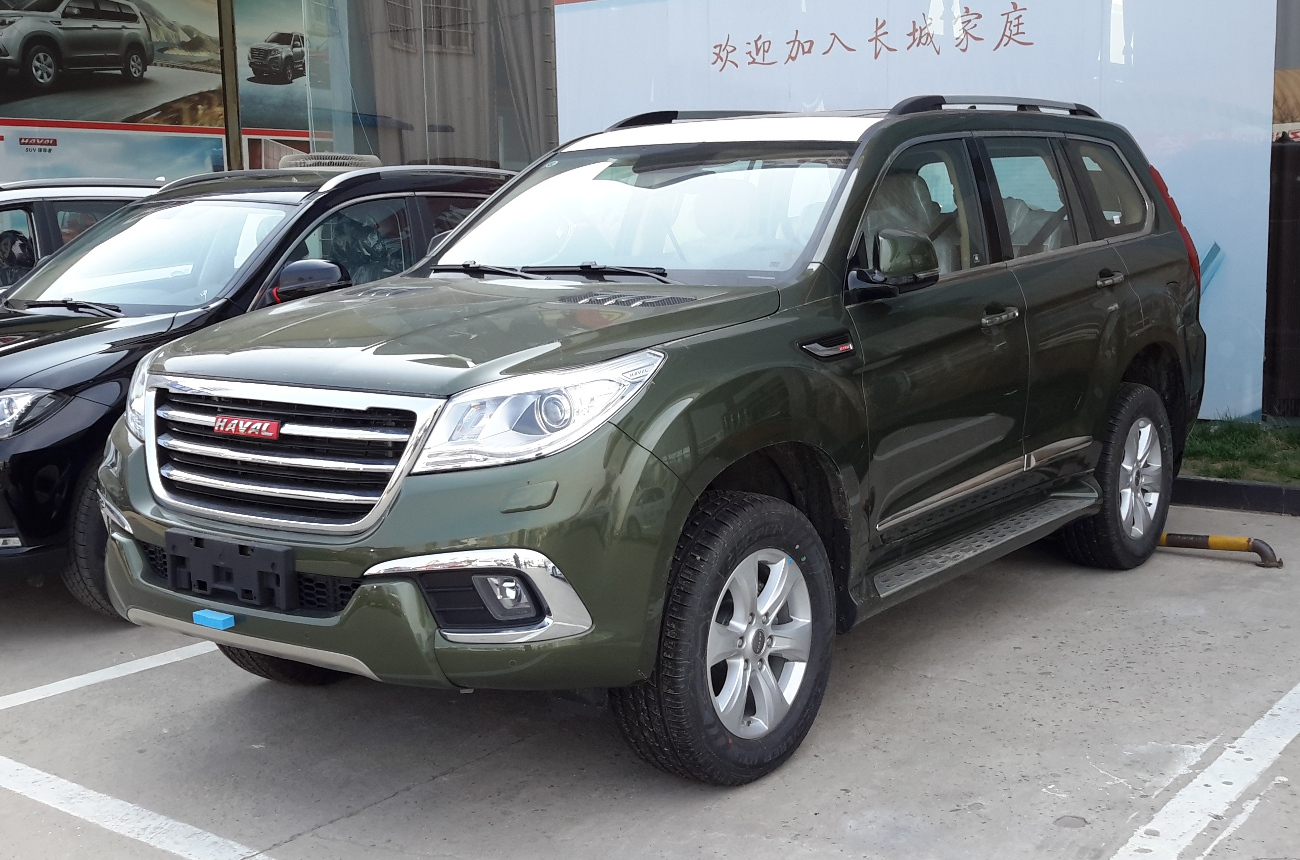

Overview
- Also called: Great Wall Haval H9; Pyeonghwa Ppeokkugi 2019 (North Korea)
- Production: 2014–2024
- Model years: 2015–2024
- Assembly: China: Baoding; Russia: Uzlovaya (Tula plant)

Body and chassis
- Layout: Front-engine, all-wheel drive; Front-engine, four-wheel drive (2019–present)

Powertrain
- Engine: Petrol: 2.0 L GW4C20A turbo I4 (2014–2018); 2.0 L GW4C20B turbo I4 (2019–present); Diesel: 2.0 L GW4D20T twin-turbo I4 (2016–2018)
- Transmission: 6-speed automatic (2014–2015); 8-speed ZF 8HP automatic (2016–present)

Dimensions
- Wheelbase: 2,800 mm (110.2 in)
- Length: 4,856 mm (191.2 in) (interior spare wheel); 5,090 mm (200.4 in) (exterior spare wheel)
- Width: 1,926 mm (75.8 in)
- Height: 1,900 mm (74.8 in)
- Kerb weight: 2,250 kg (4,960 lb)

Chronology
- Predecessor: Great Wall Sing

The Haval H9 is a full-size SUV produced by Haval, a sub-brand of Great Wall Motor debuted on the 2014 Beijing Auto Show and commenced production in November 2014.

Construction is a body-on-frame chassis underpinned with double-wishbone front suspension, and a multi-link solid axle at the rear. Initial H9's were powered by a turbocharged 2.0-litre I4 petrol engine with 214 hp (160 kW; 217 PS) at 5500 rpm, and 260 lb⋅ft (353 N⋅m; 36 kg⋅m) of torque between 2000 and 4000 rpm with power being sent through a 6-speed automatic transmission. In 2017, the 2.0L had been reworked to produce 241 hp (180 kW; 244 PS) at 5500 rpm, and 258 lb⋅ft (350 N⋅m; 36 kg⋅m) of torque between 1800 and 4500 rpm. A ZF 8-speed automatic transmission was also added to improve fuel efficiency and performance.

An All-Terrain four-wheel-drive control system is available and modulates engine response between various modes including Auto, Snow, Sand, Mud and 4 Low.

The H9 was given a facelift for 2019 onwards consisting of a new front end as well as the rear spare tyre moved from the rear door to the bottom of the car.

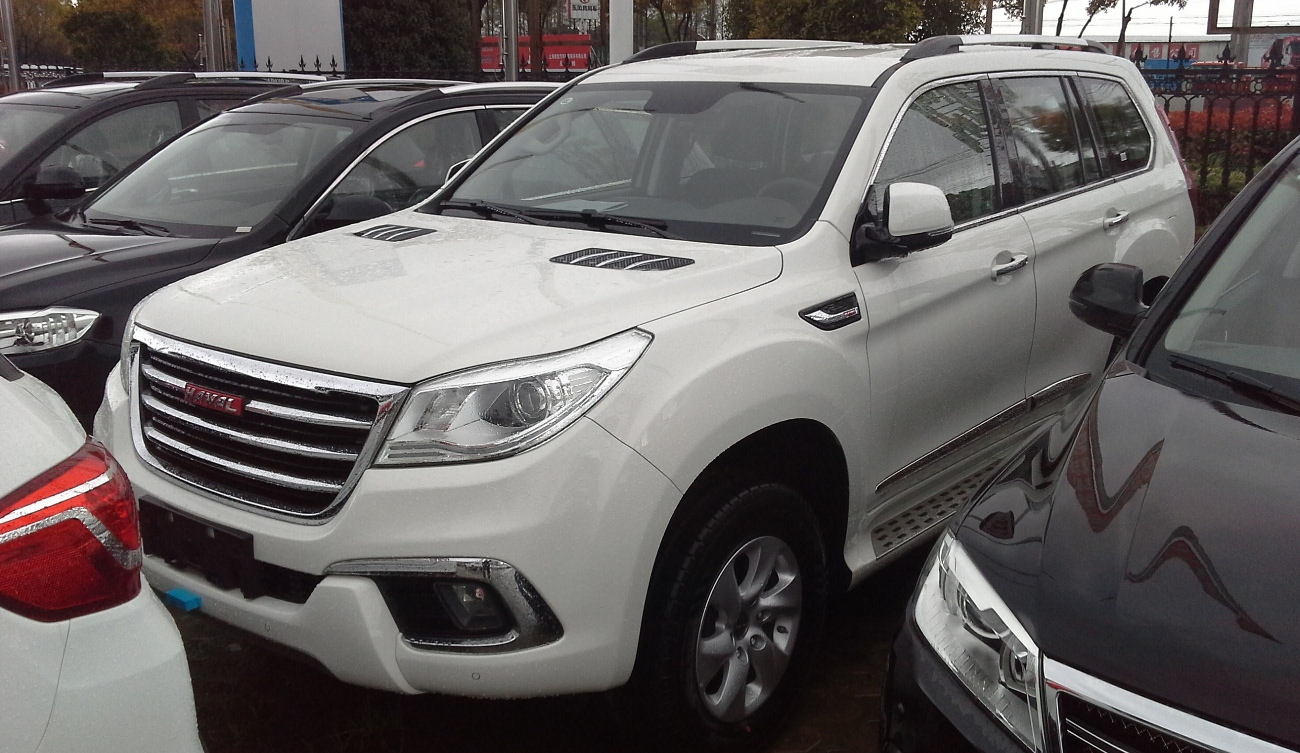
Haval H9 front

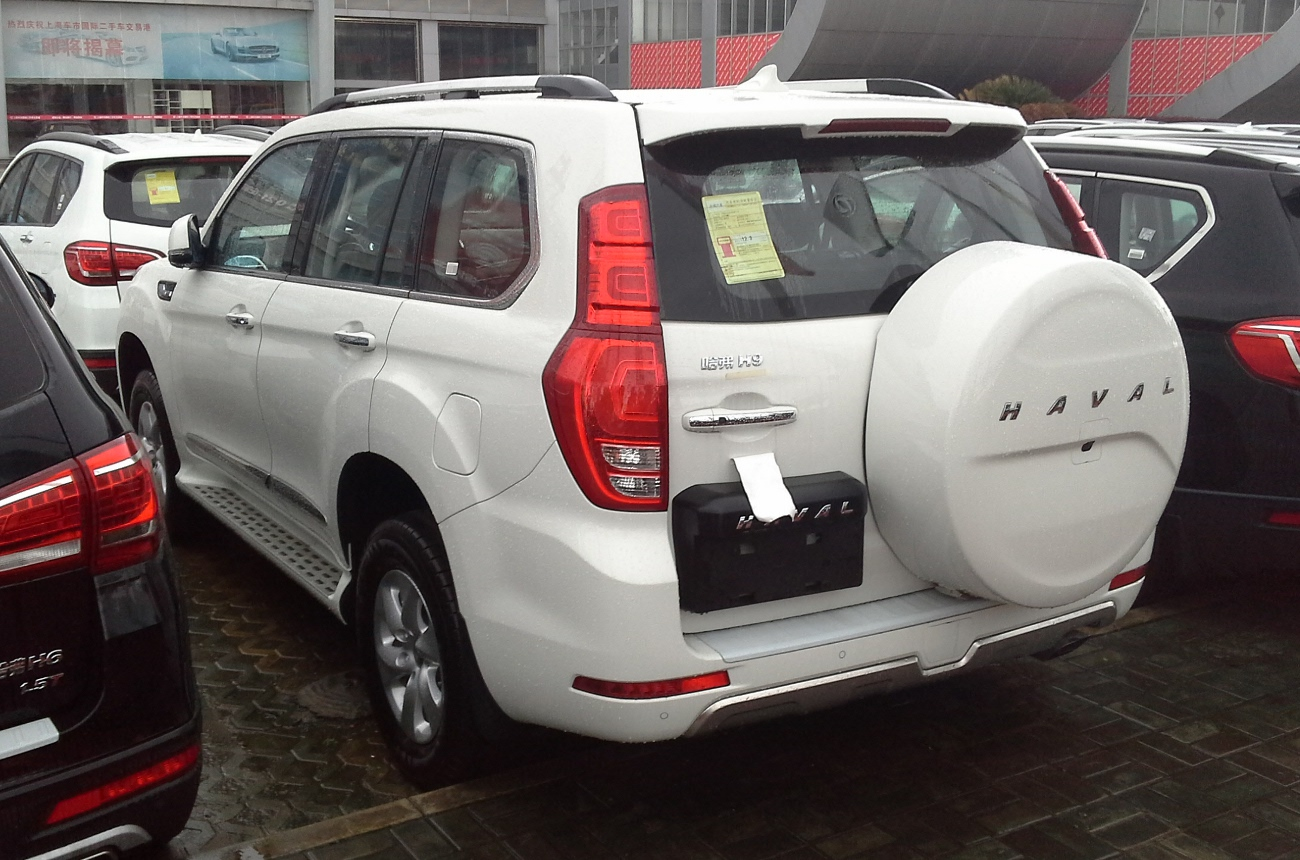
Haval H9 rear

Haval H9 2019 facelift front

Haval H9 2019 facelift rear

=== Australian market ===
The Haval H9 SUV was upgraded for the 2018 model year in the fourth quarter of 2017. The exterior features new grilles, fog lights and new alloy wheels, while the interior feature a new instrument panel with digital speedometer.

The main changes to the 2018 Haval H9, involves the engine and powertrain; with power from the 2.0-litre turbo-petrol four-cylinder engine tuned up from 160 to 180 kW (215 to 241 hp; 218 to 245 PS), while the torque has increased from 324 to 350 N⋅m (239 to 258 lb⋅ft; 33 to 36 kg⋅m). The six-speed automatic transmission was replaced by a ZF eight-speed transmission for the 2018 facelift and fuel economy has improved from 12.1 to 11 L/100 km (8.3 to 9.1 km/L; 19.4 to 21.4 mpg_{‑US}) as a result. Acceleration time from 0 to 100 km/h (0 to 62 mph) has decreased from 13.4 to 10.6 seconds. For the safety features of the 2018 model year Haval H9, Lane departure warning and blind spot monitoring are standard features, while the top of the trim LUX model comes with an additional panoramic sunroof. In terms of off-road performance, Haval Australia has also been working with Australian suspension company Ironman 4X4 to develop an exclusive Australian suspension tune for the Australian market Haval H9s. The results are heavier springs, upgraded shock absorber valving, and toe-in minor changes. All 2018 H9 models feature a new anti-lock brake system module with re-calibrated electronic stability control.

== Second generation (2024) ==
Second generation
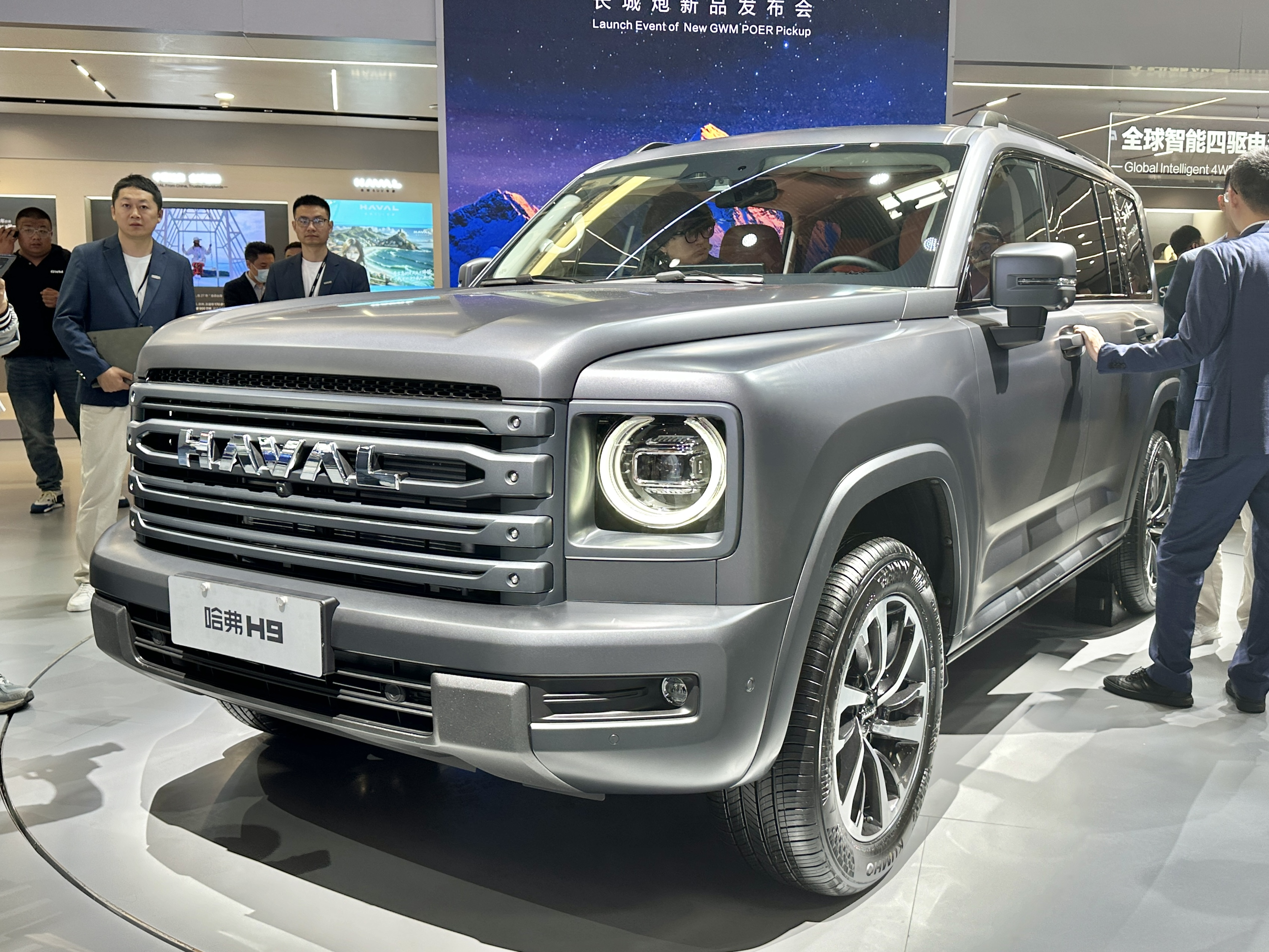

Overview
- Production: 2024–present
- Assembly: China: Baoding; Brazil: Iracemápolis; Uzbekistan: Jizzakh (ADM)

Body and chassis
- Layout: Front-engine, four-wheel drive
- Related: Haval Raptor

Powertrain
- Engine: Petrol: 2.0 L GW4C20B turbo I4; Diesel: 2.4 L GW4D24 turbo I4
- Transmission: 8-speed automatic; 9-speed automatic

Dimensions
- Wheelbase: 2,850 mm (112.2 in)
- Length: 4,950–5,070 mm (194.9–199.6 in)
- Width: 1,976 mm (77.8 in)
- Height: 1,930 mm (76.0 in)

The first images of the second-generation Haval H9 was unveiled in January 2024, showcasing a boxy and rugged-looking SUV. The powertrain continues to feature a 2.0-litre turbo engine paired with an 8-speed automatic transmission, along with an additional 2.4-litre turbo diesel engine paired with a 9-speed automatic transmission as an option.

Haval H9 II front view

Haval H9 II side view

Haval H9 II rear view

Haval H9 II and Haval Raptor

== Safety ==
In 2015, ANCAP rated the car with 4 stars out of five.

ANCAP test results GWM Haval H9 (2015)
Test	Score
Overall	4 /5 stars
Frontal offset	12.05/16
Side impact	16/16
Pole	Not Assessed
Seat belt reminders	2.6/3
Whiplash protection	Good
Pedestrian protection	Adequate
Electronic stability control	Standard

== Sales ==
Year	China
2024	11,009
2025	14,251
