= Haval H8 =

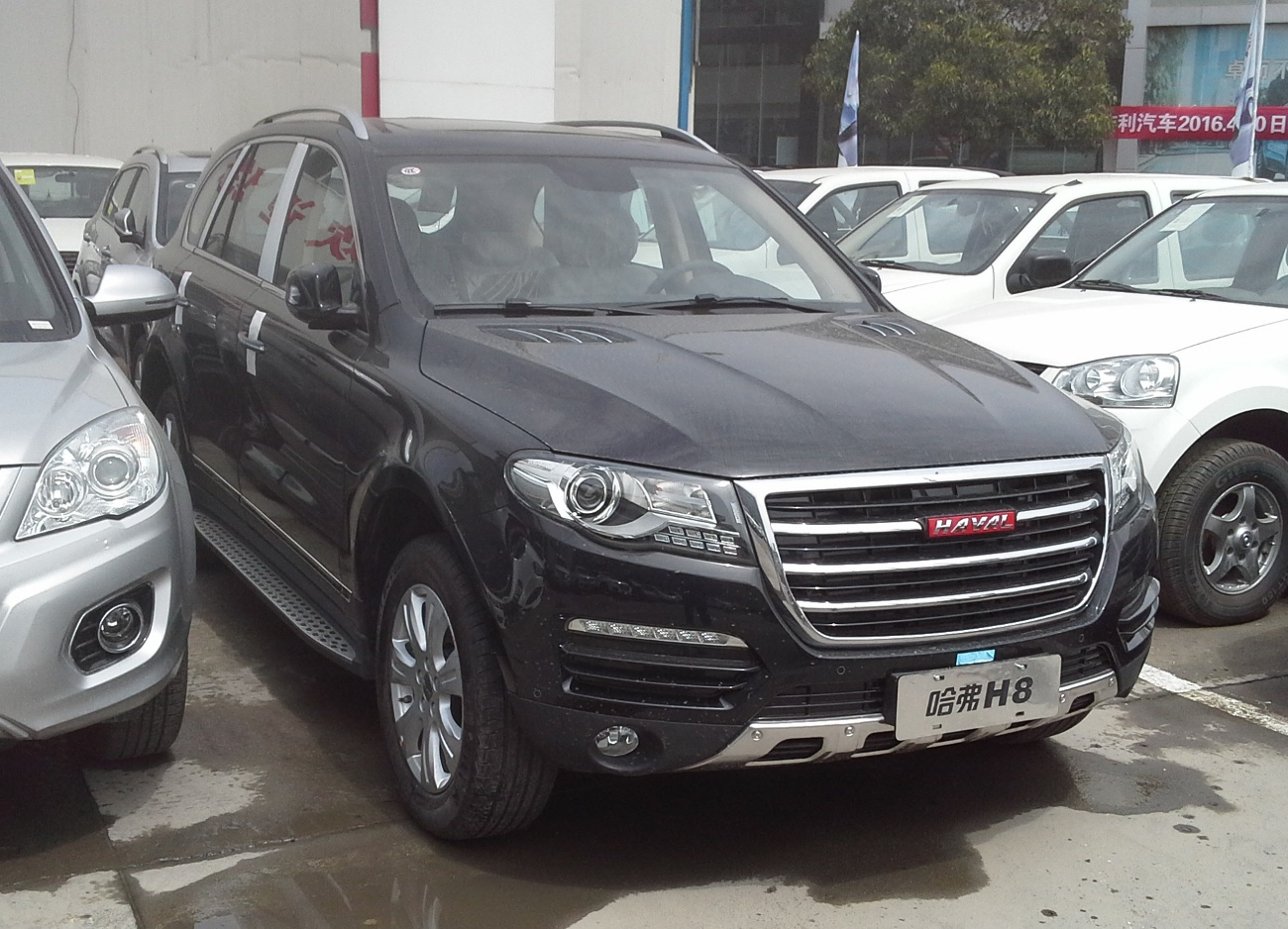

Overview
- Manufacturer: Great Wall Motor
- Production: 2013–2018
- Assembly: Baoding, China

Body and chassis
- Class: Mid-size crossover SUV
- Body style: 5-door SUV
- Layout: Front-engine, rear-wheel drive Front-engine, four-wheel drive
- Related: Haval H7

Powertrain
- Engine: 2.0 L GW4C20A I4 (turbo petrol); 2.0 L GW4D20 I4 (diesel)
- Transmission: 6 speed automatic 8 speed ZF 8HP automatic

Dimensions
- Wheelbase: 2,915 mm (114.8 in)
- Length: 4,806 mm (189.2 in)
- Width: 1,810 mm (71.3 in)
- Height: 1,975 mm (77.8 in)

Chronology
- Successor: Haval H9

The Haval H8 is a mid-size crossover SUV produced by Haval, a sub-brand of Great Wall Motor.

== Overview ==
The Haval H8 was previewed on the April 2012 Beijing Auto Show as the Great Wall Haval H7 concept; the production version was revealed on the Chinese car market during the 2013 Guangzhou Auto Show. Pricing of the Haval H8 SUV ranges from 183,800 to 231,800 yuan. The chassis of the H8 is a unibody, while suspension in the front is double-wishbone independent, with the rear being multi-link independent. Drive train options include both 4×2 and 4×4.

The Haval H8 is powered by a 2.0-litre turbo-petrol engine making 160 kW (215 hp) at 5500rpm and 324 N⋅m (239 lb⋅ft) of torque between 2000 and 4000rpm. The engine is mated to a ZF six-speed automatic gearbox. The torque is directed to the rear wheels by default, with a transfer case by Borg-Warner sending up to 50 per cent of torque to the front wheels when needed.

Haval H8 front view

Haval H8 rear view
