= Haval Xiaolong Max =

Plug-in hybrid mid-size crossover SUV

Overview
- Manufacturer: Haval
- Also called: Haval Max PHEV Hi4 (4WD version); Haval H6L (2025–present)
- Production: 2023–present
- Assembly: China: Tianjin

Body and chassis
- Class: Mid-size crossover SUV
- Body style: 5-door SUV
- Layout: Front-engine, front-wheel-drive or four-wheel-drive
- Related: Haval Xiaolong

Powertrain
- Engine: Petrol: 1.5 L I4; 1.5 L turbo I4
- Electric motor: 85 kW (114 hp; 116 PS) DHT100 BorgWarner permanent magnet synchronous motor; 113 kW (152 hp; 154 PS) DHT100 BorgWarner permanent magnet synchronous motor
- Power output: (Turbo Hybrid); (PHEV)
- Transmission: 7-speed DCT; Multi-mode DHT (hybrid)
- Hybrid drivetrain: Power-split Hybrid; Plug-in hybrid
- Battery: 9.4 or 19.27 kWh (33.8 or 69.4 MJ)

Dimensions
- Wheelbase: 2,800 mm (110.2 in); 2,810 mm (110.6 in) (facelift, H6L)
- Length: 4,758 mm (187.3 in); 4,780 mm (188.2 in) (facelift); 4,800 mm (189.0 in) (H6L)
- Width: 1,895 mm (74.6 in)
- Height: 1,725 mm (67.9 in); 1,800 mm (70.9 in) (H6L)
- Curb weight: 1,980–2,000 kg (4,365–4,409 lb)

The Haval Xiaolong Max (Chinese: 哈弗枭龙MAX) and Haval H6L (Chinese: 哈弗H6L) is a plug-in hybrid mid-size crossover SUV produced by Great Wall Motor under the Haval brand.

== Overview ==
Originally codenamed B07 during development, the Xiaolong Max was launched in March 2023.

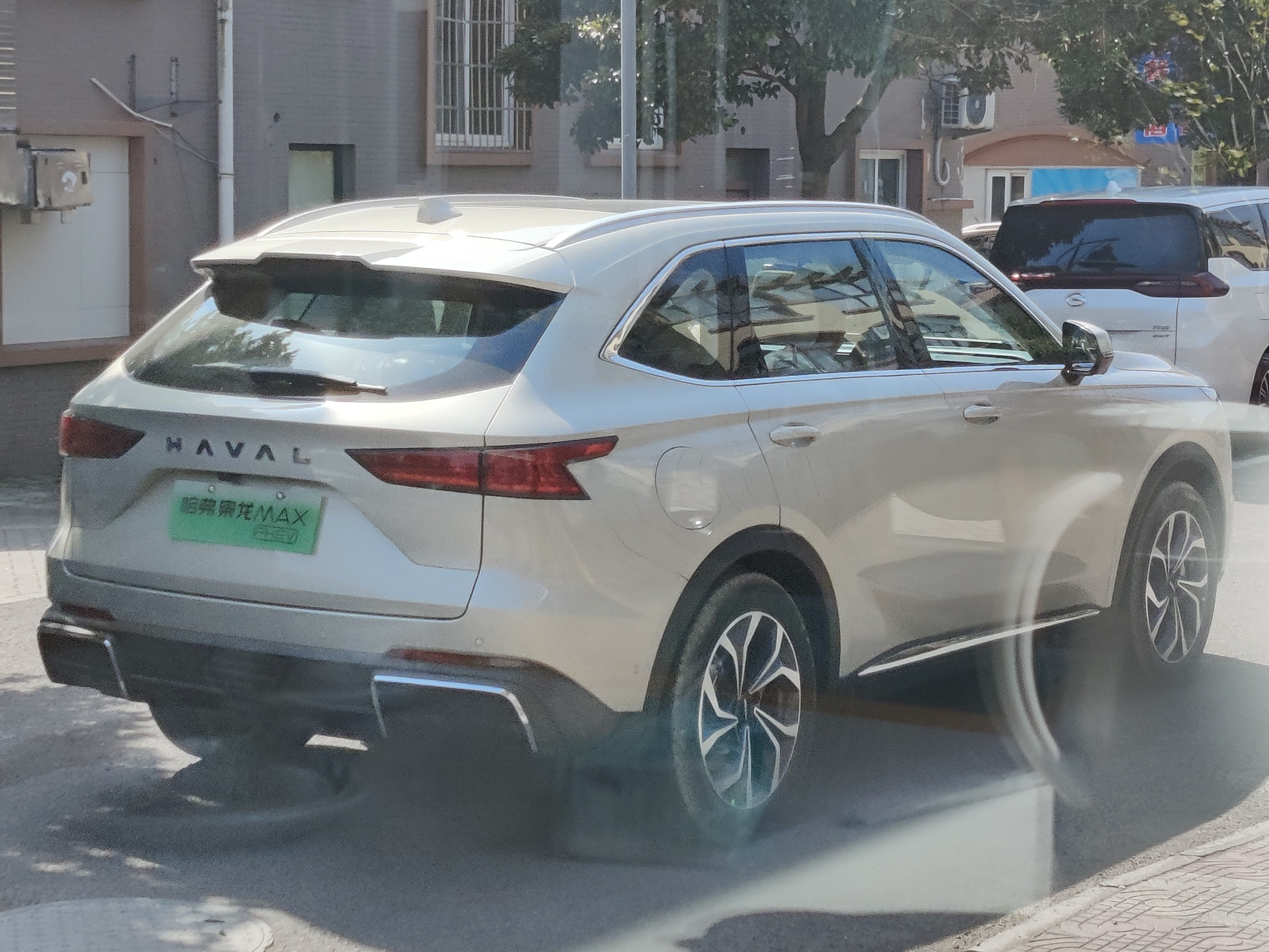
Rear view

=== 2025 (facelift) ===
The facelift of Xiaolong Max was launched on 11 March 2025.

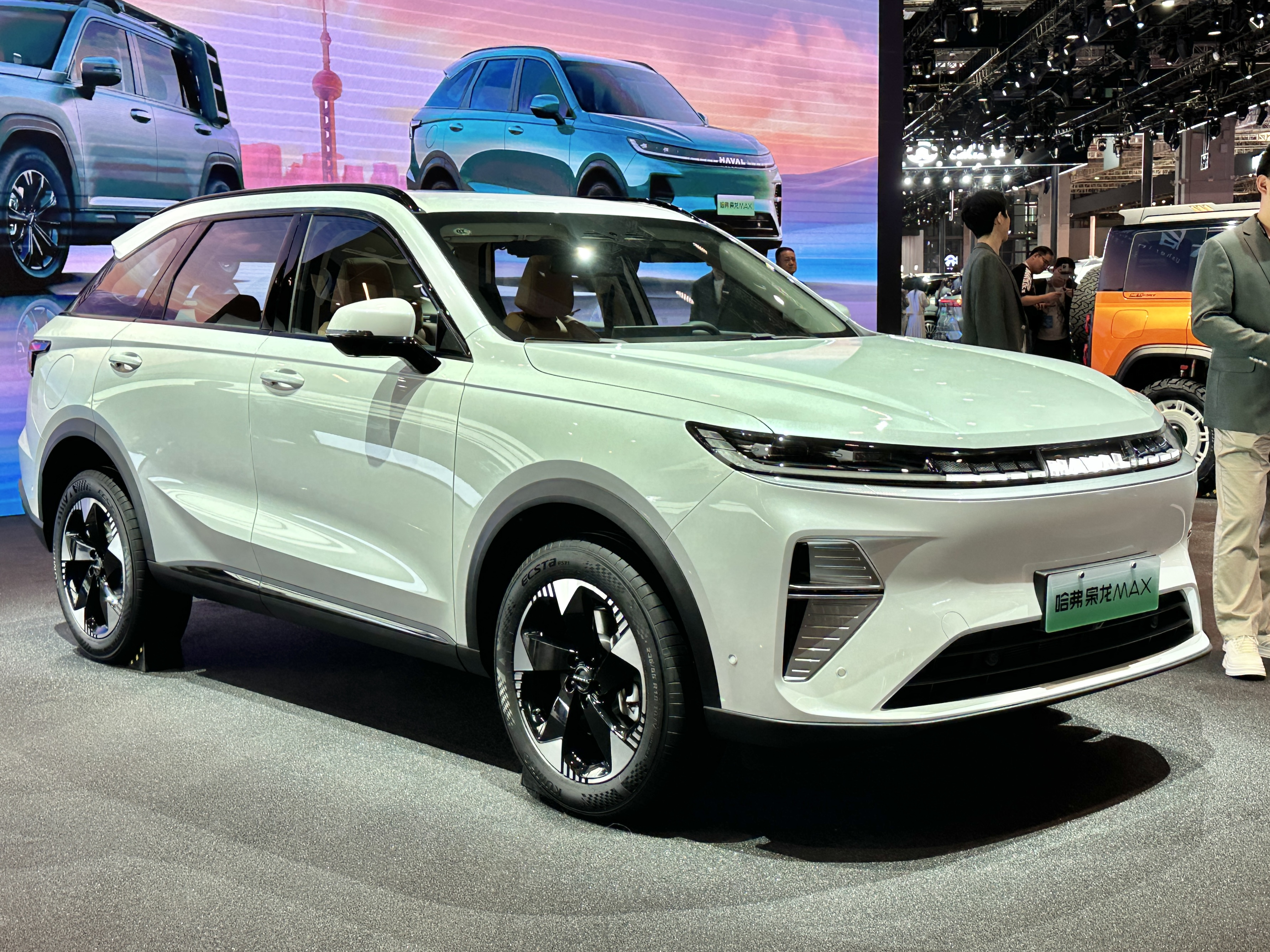
Haval Xiaolong Max 2025 (facelift)

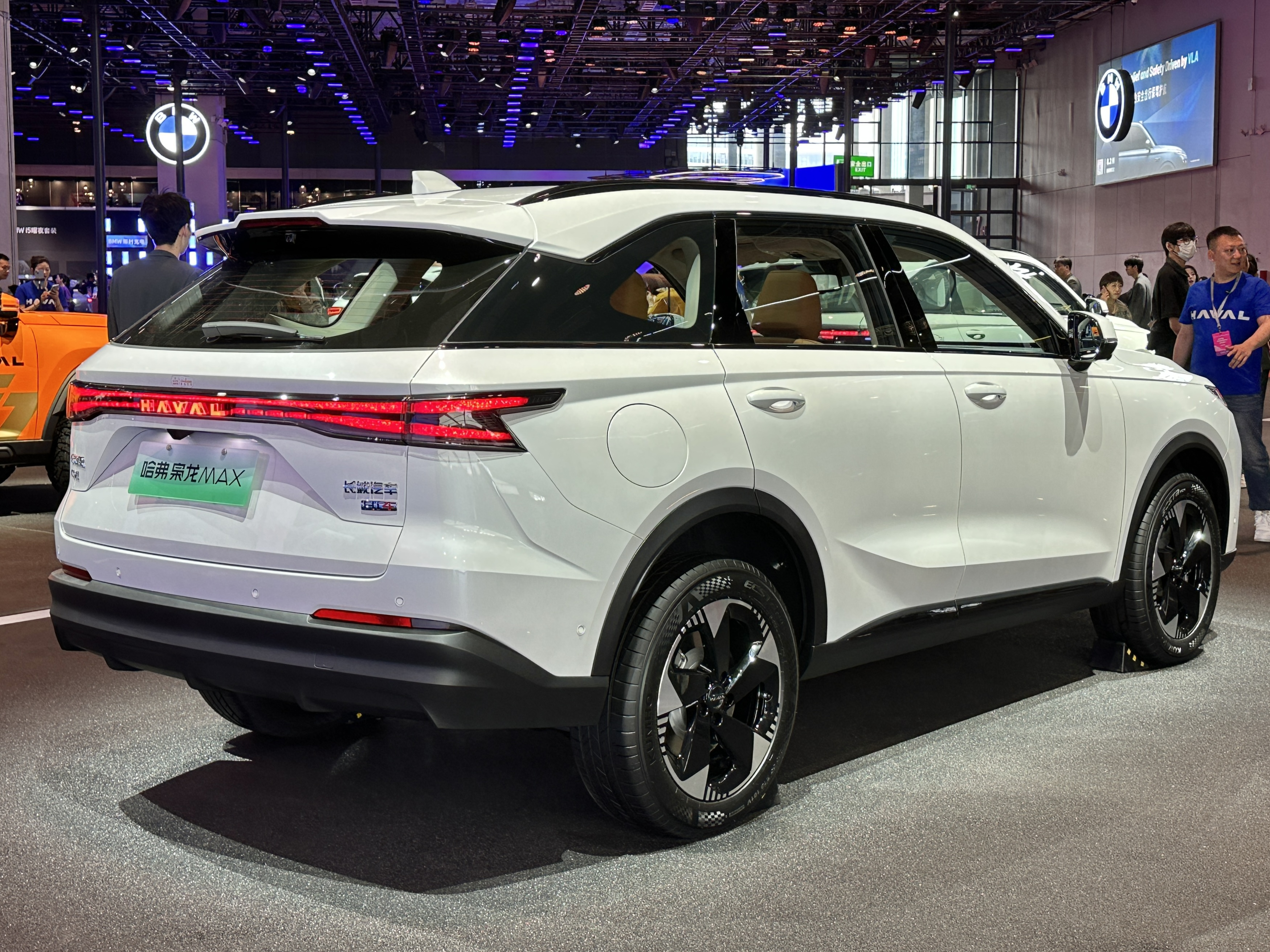
Rear view

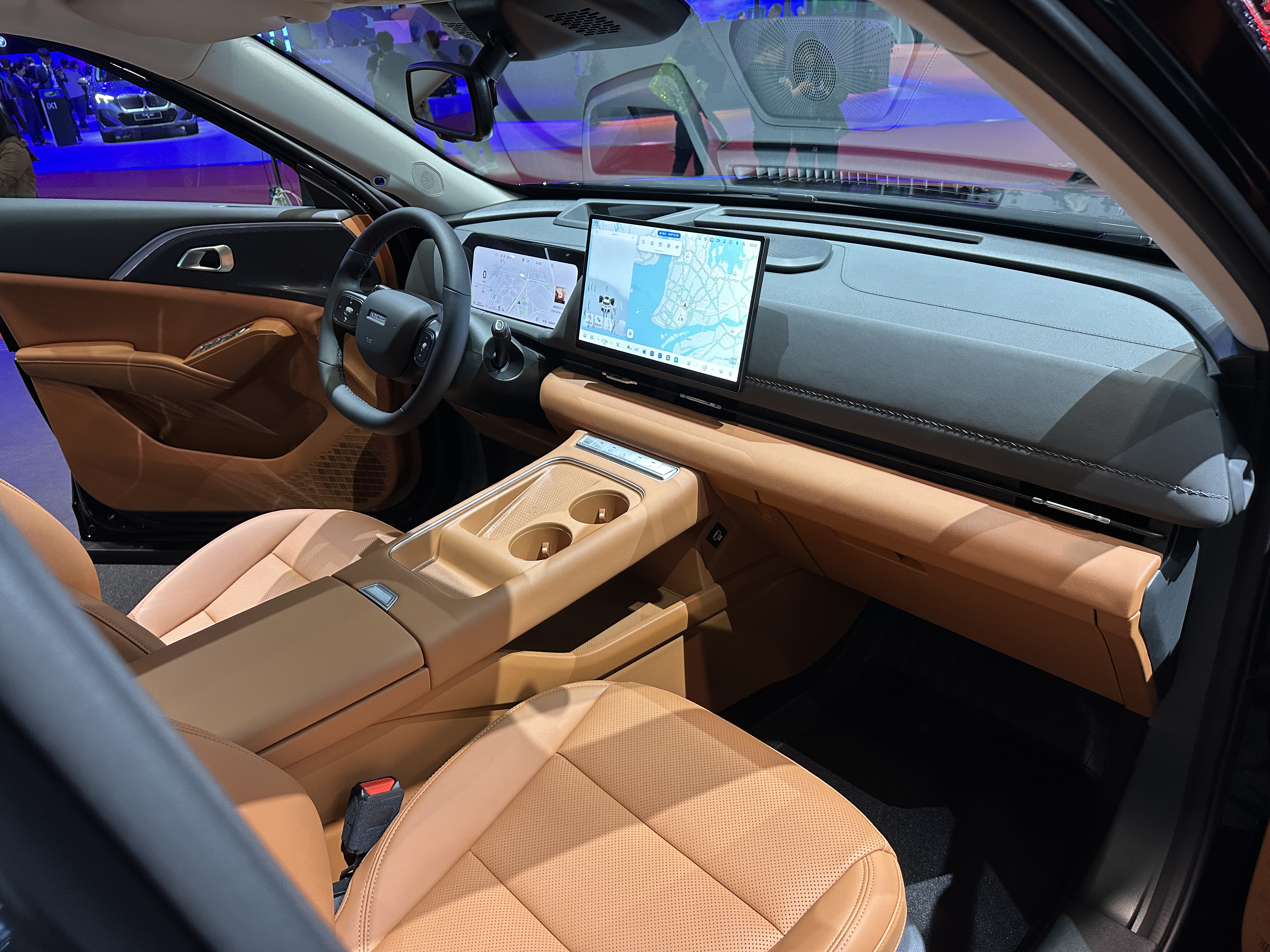
Interior

== Powertrain ==
The Xiaolong Max has two plug-in hybrid powertrains using either a 85-kilowatt (114 hp; 116 PS) naturally aspirated or a 113-kilowatt (152 hp; 154 PS) turbocharged 1.5-litre four-cylinder engine, with a choice of 9.41 and 19.27 kWh (33.9 and 69.4 MJ) battery packs with claimed WLTC pure electric range of 44 and 86 kilometres (27 and 53 mi), respectively. The fuel consumption of the Haval Xiaolong Max is 5.6 L/100 km (17.9 km/L; 50.4 mpg_{‑imp}; 42.0 mpg_{‑US}).

== Haval H6L ==
The H6L is the internal combustion engine variant of the Xiaolong Max. Sharing most of the exterior appearance of the 2025 model year Xiaolong Max, it was launched in November 2025 with the sixth generation Great Wall Motor engine technology, and was powered by a 2.0-liter turbo engine producing 175 kW (235 hp; 238 PS) and 385 N⋅m (284 lb⋅ft) mated to a 9-speed dual clutch transmission. 0 to 100 km/h (62 mph) acceleration time is 7.2 seconds and WLTC fuel consumption is 7.4 L/100 km (13.5 km/L; 38.2 mpg_{‑imp}; 31.8 mpg_{‑US}).

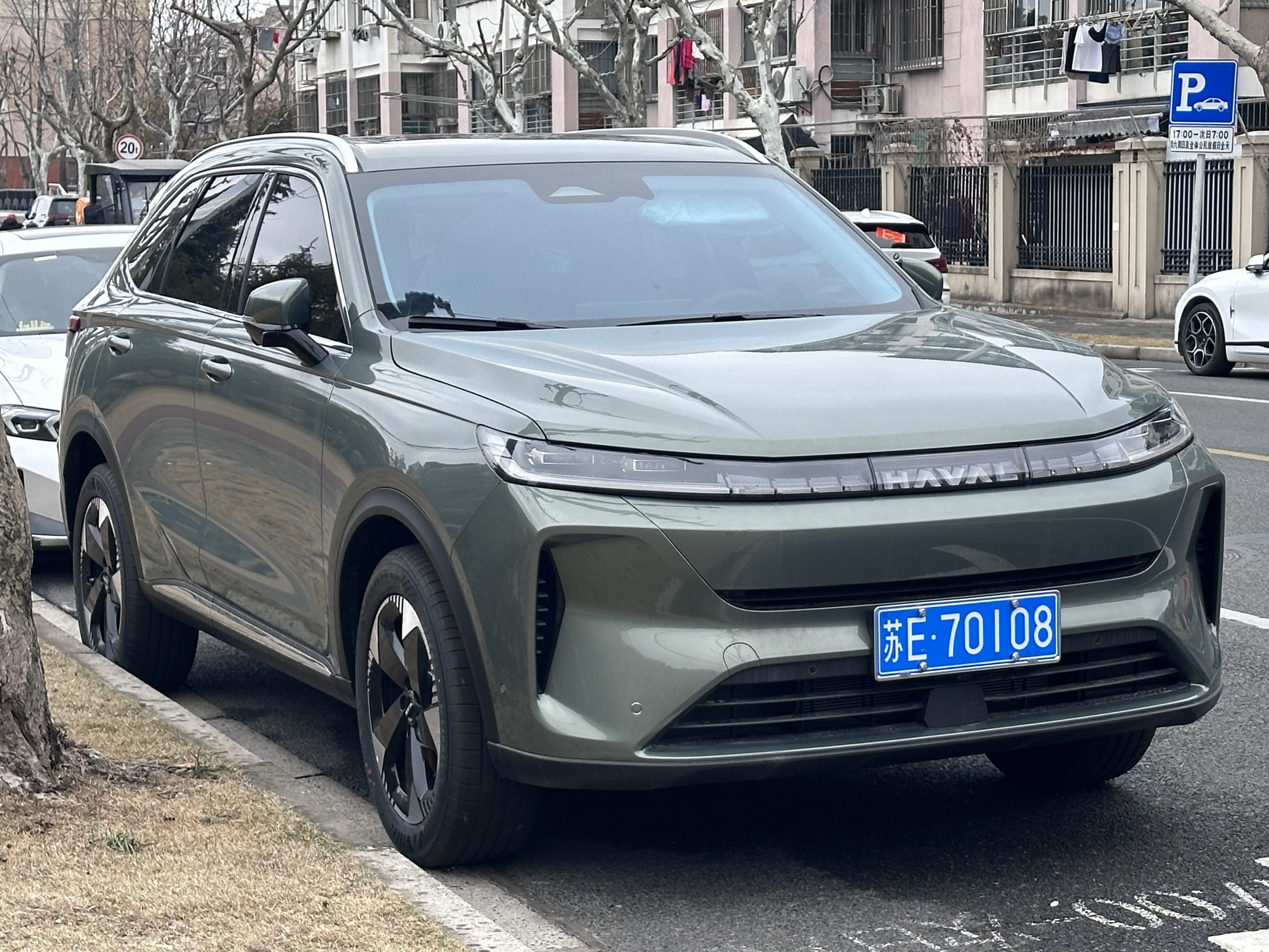
Haval H6L

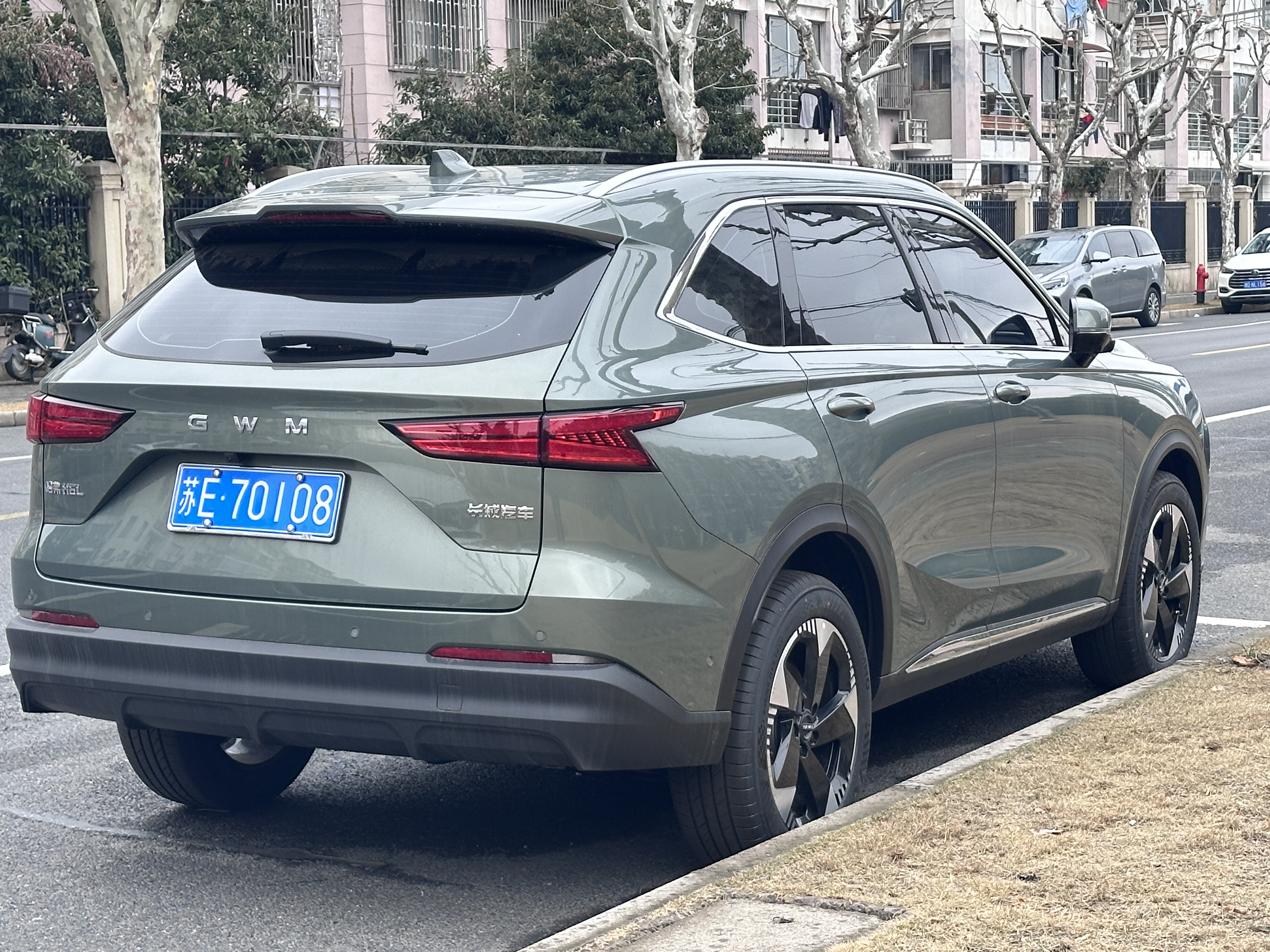
Rear view

== Sales ==
Year	China	
Year	Xiaolong Max	H6L
2023	20,246	—
2024	6,233	—
2025	28,174	4,105
