= Haval Raptor =

Compact SUV

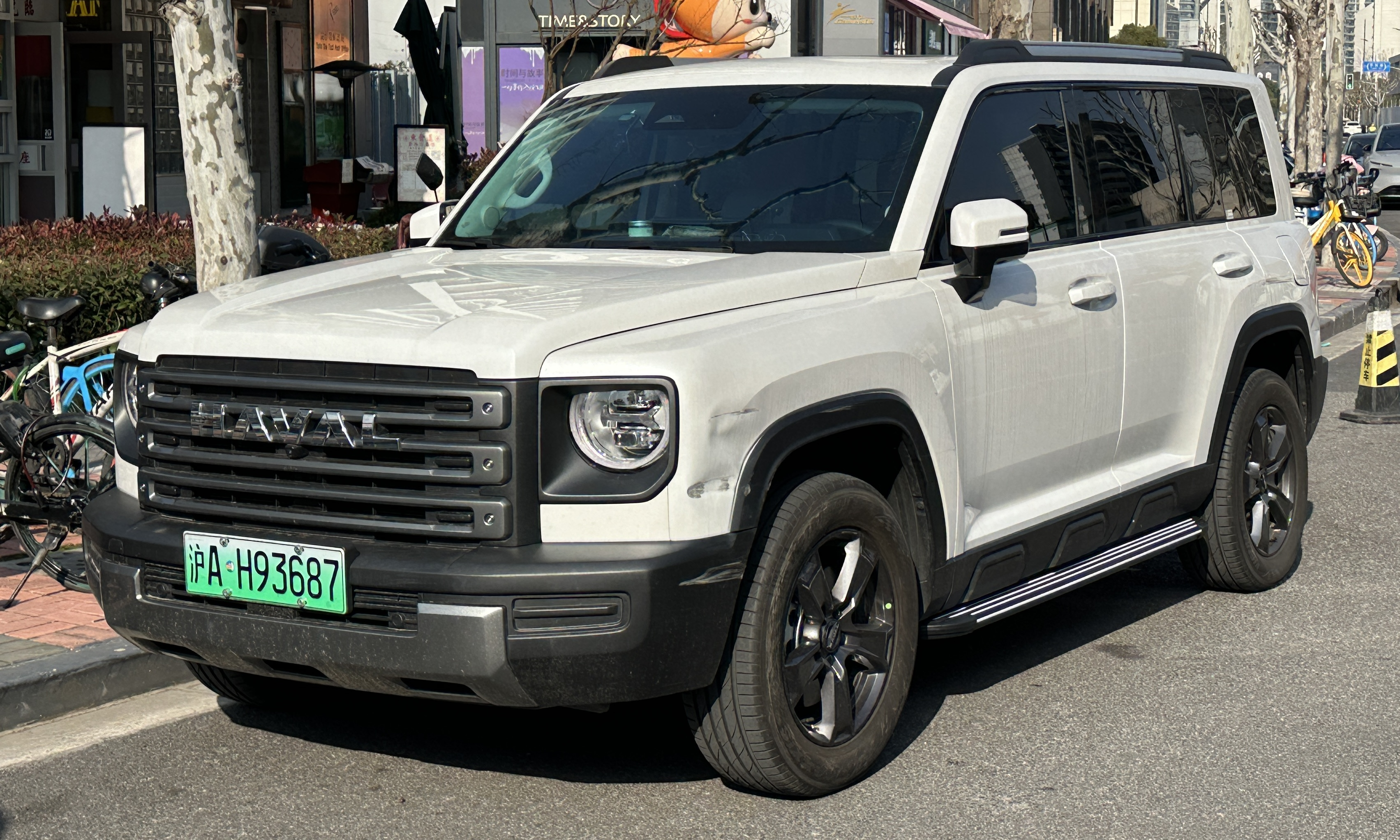
- Haval Raptor (PHEV)

Overview
- Manufacturer: Great Wall Motor
- Model code: B26
- Also called: Haval H7 (export); Haval V7 (Middle East)
- Production: 2023–present
- Assembly: China: Tianjin

Body and chassis
- Class: Compact SUV; Mid-size SUV (Plus)
- Body style: 5-door SUV
- Layout: Four-wheel-drive
- Related: Haval H9

Powertrain
- Engine: Petrol plug-in hybrid: 1.5 L I4; Petrol: 2.0 L turbo
- Power output: 278–282 kW (373–378 bhp; 378–383 PS)
- Transmission: 9-speed DCT (petrol); Multi-mode DHT (PHEV)
- Hybrid drivetrain: Plug-in hybrid
- Battery: 19.1 kWh LFP; 27.5 kWh LFP

Dimensions
- Wheelbase: 2,738 mm (107.8 in); 2,850 mm (112.2 in) (Plus)
- Length: 4,680–4,800 mm (184.3–189.0 in); 4,792–4,912 mm (188.7–193.4 in) (Plus)
- Width: 1,950 mm (76.8 in) (petrol); 1,916 mm (75.4 in) (PHEV)
- Height: 1,843 mm (72.6 in) (petrol); 1,822 mm (71.7 in) (PHEV)
- Curb weight: 1,830–2,135 kg (4,034–4,707 lb)

The Haval Raptor (Chinese: 哈弗猛龙) is a compact SUV produced by Great Wall Motor under the Haval brand. A slightly longer Haval Raptor Plus (Chinese: 长城猛龙Plus) classified as a 5 to 7-seater Mid-size SUV was added in 2026.

== Overview ==
After the Chinese Ministry of Industry and Information Technology was published initial information about the vehicle with the internal code B26 in June 2023, the Raptor was officially presented in August 2023. It went on sale in the Chinese market on 10 October 2023. The petrol-powered version was added later in May 2025, featuring restyled front grilles.

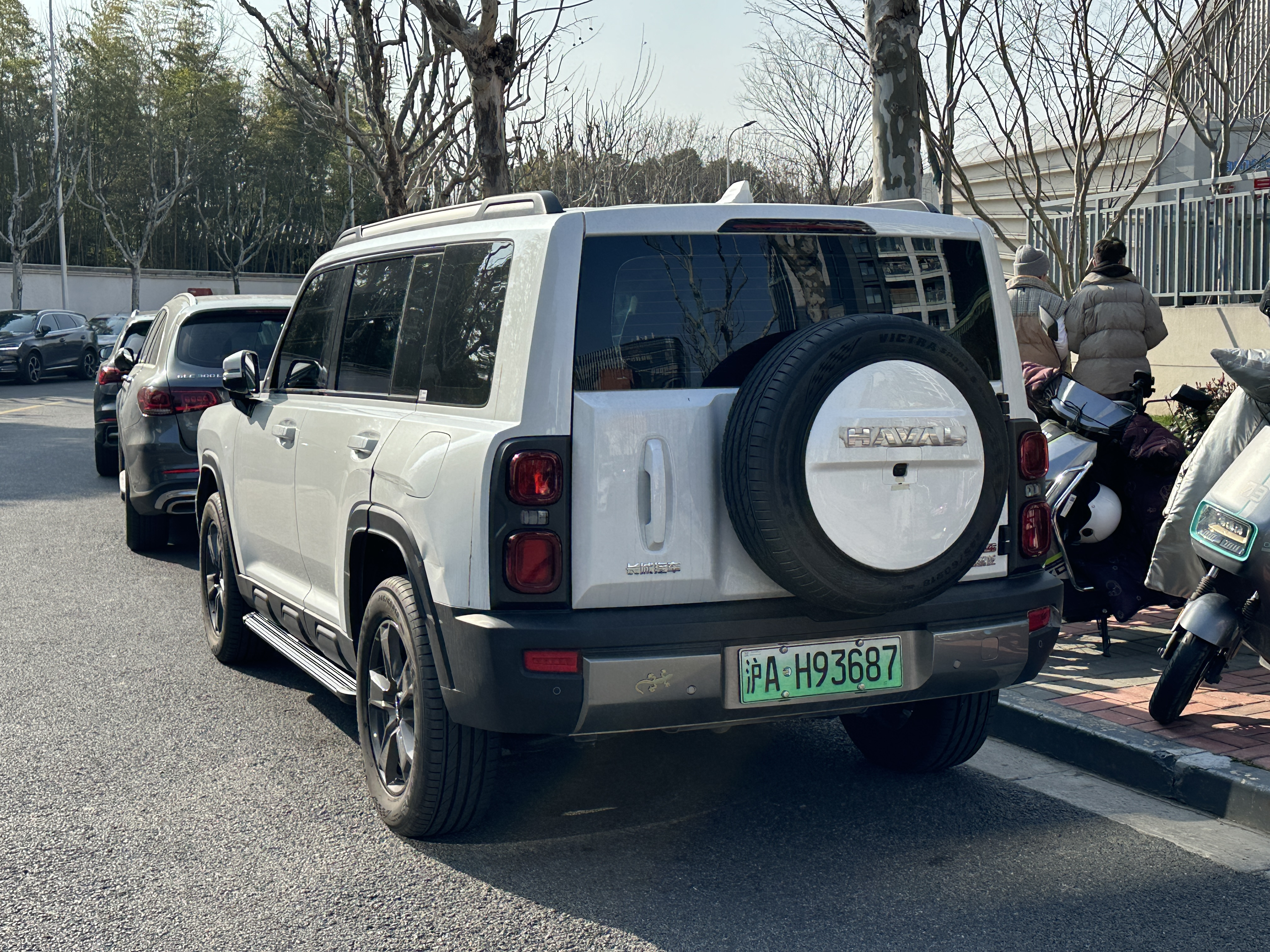
Rear view

Haval Raptor (petrol)

Rear view

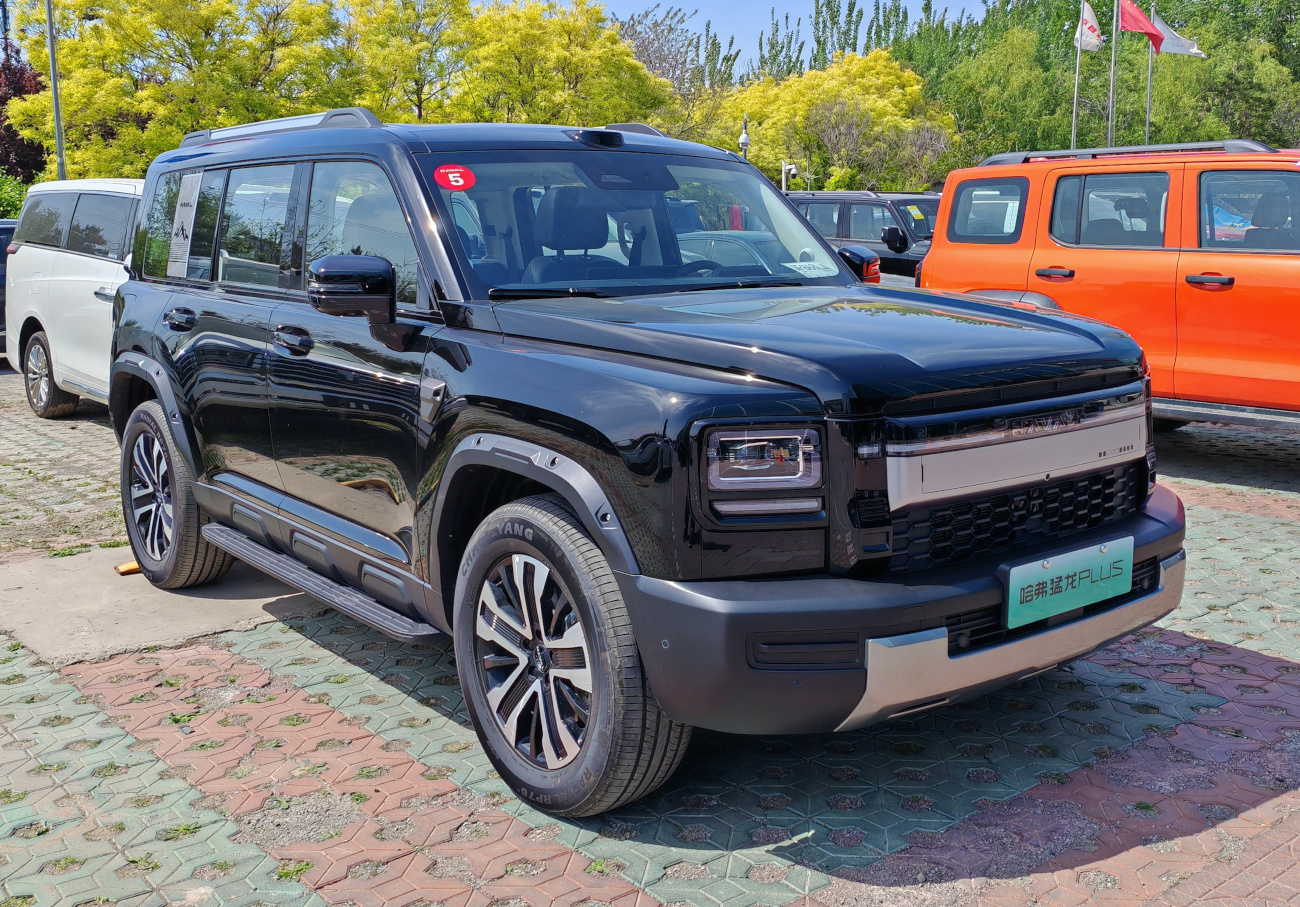
Haval Raptor Plus

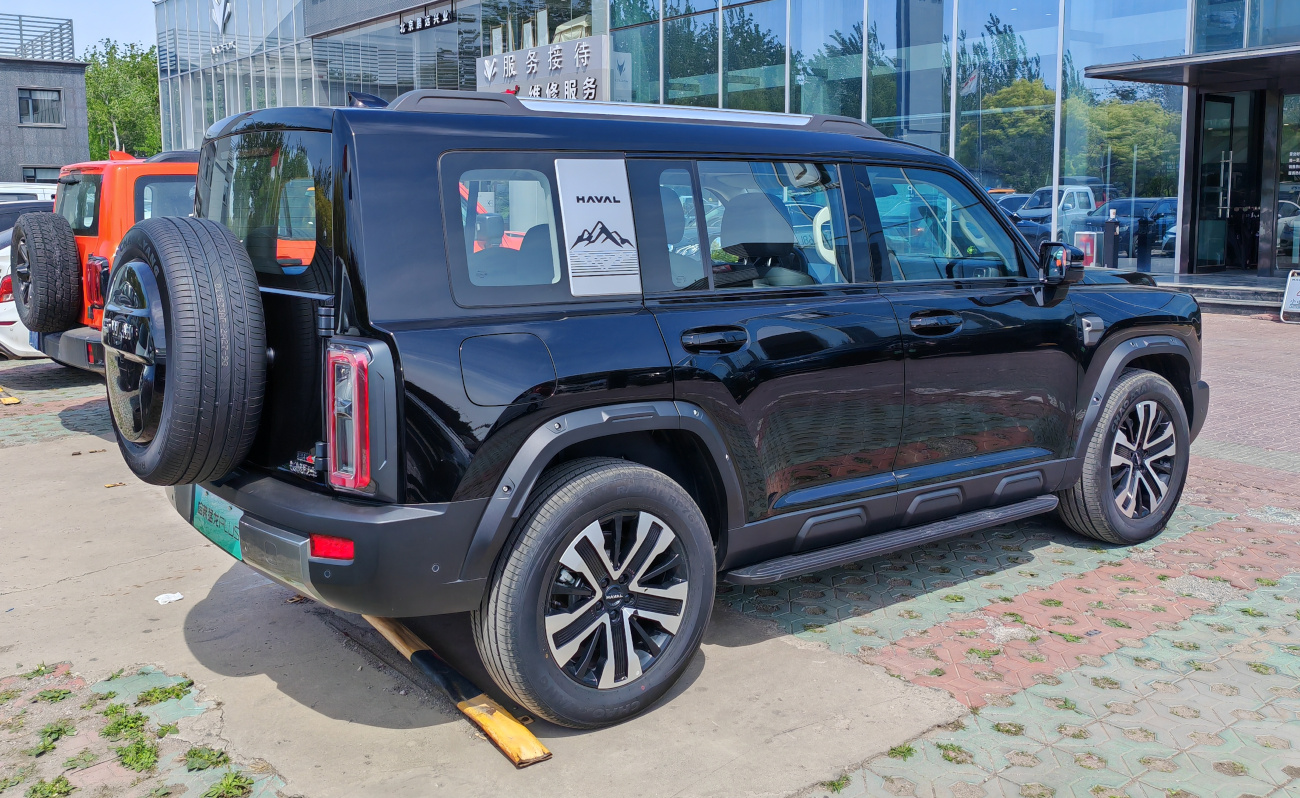
Rear view

== Markets ==
=== Brunei ===
The Raptor was launched in Brunei on 21 October 2026 as the Haval H7 and the model were offered in two variants: petrol (2.0-litre) and hybrid (1.5-litre HEV).

== Specifications ==
The five-seater Raptor is offered exclusively as a plug-in hybrid with all-wheel drive at launch in 2023. There are two variants to choose from. The cheaper one has a 19.1 kWh lithium iron phosphate battery and a system output of 278 kW (373 bhp; 378 PS), the top model has a lithium iron phosphate battery with 27.5 kWh and a system output of 282 kW (378 bhp; 383 PS).The vehicle's ground clearance is 20 centimeters and the fording depth is 56 centimeters. The approach angle is given as 24 degrees at the front and 30 degrees at the rear.

The petrol-powered version was added in May 2025, featuring a slightly revised front end styling. The powertrain is GWM's newly self-developed 2.0 liter turbo engine adopting Miller cycle and high compression ratio. The engine has a maximum power output of 175kW and WLTC combined fuel consumption of 8.65L/100km. It is matched with a 9DCT wet dual-clutch transmission. The 0-100km/h acceleration time is 8.1 seconds. The approach angle is given as 25 degrees at the front and 32 degrees at the rear. The ground clearance is 223mm and the maximum wading depth is 580mm.

In May 2026, the 7-seater Raptor Plus was added exclusively as a PHEV with the Hi4 powertrain.

== Sales ==
Year	China	
Year	PHEV	Petrol
2023	12,785	—
2024	63,025	—
2025	62,336	19,759
