= Haval (marque) =

Chinese automotive brand owned by Great Wall Motors

- Product type: Automobile
- Current owner: Great Wall Motor
- Country: China
- Introduced: 2013; 13 years ago
- Markets: Worldwide
- Ambassador: Zhao Yongpo (Haval brand CEO)
- Website: haval.com.cn (Chinese) gwm-global.com/brands/haval/haval-global.html (English)

Chinese name
- Simplified Chinese: 哈弗
- Hanyu Pinyin: Hāfú

Haval (Chinese: 哈弗; pinyin: Hāfú; stylized in all caps) is an automotive brand owned by the Chinese automaker Great Wall Motor (GWM) that specializes in crossovers and SUVs. Haval was spun-off from a product line of GWM to a standalone brand in March 2013. As of 2024, Haval is the most popular among all brands owned by GWM such as Tank, Ora, and Wey.

== History ==
Logo until 2023

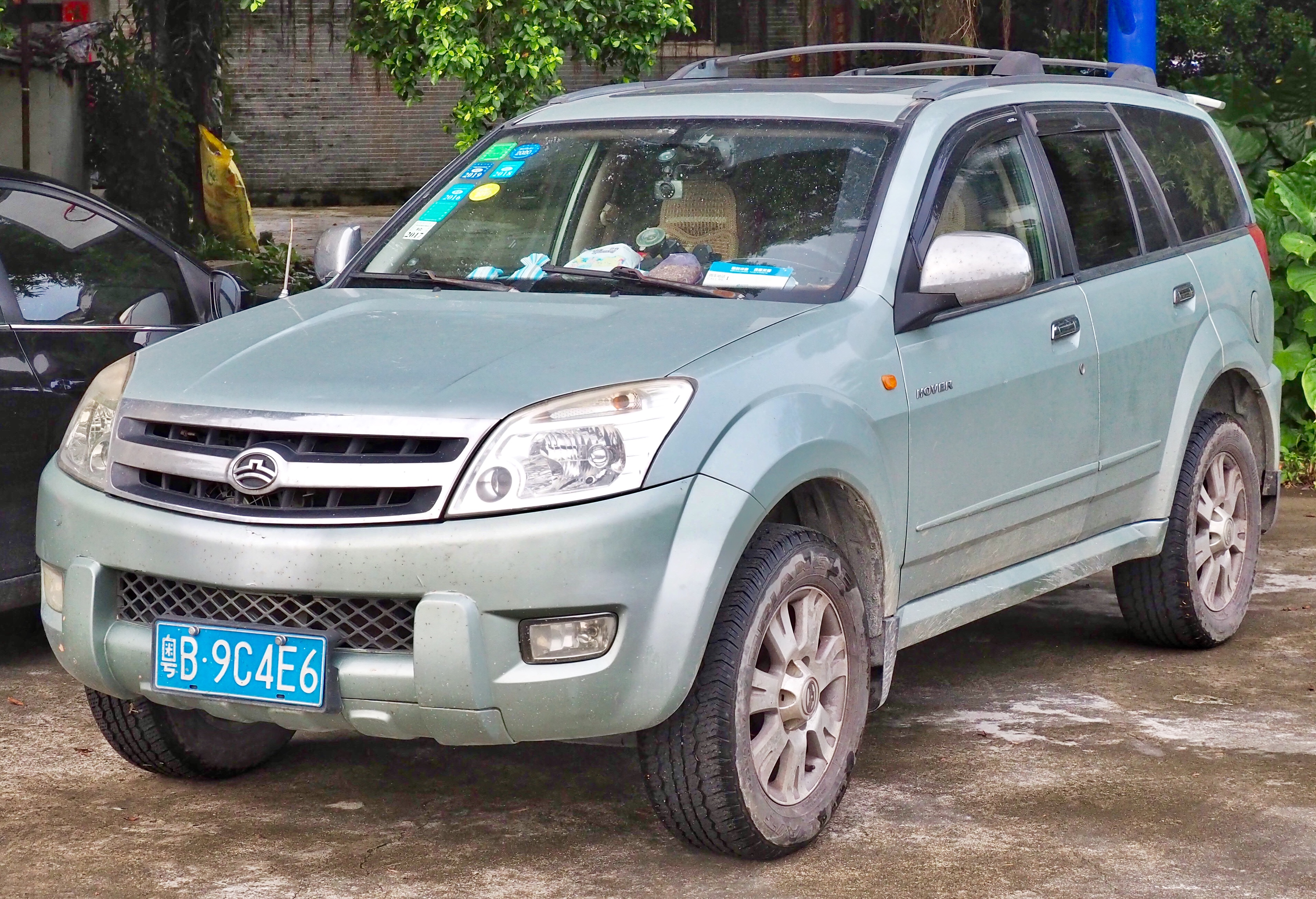
2006 Great Wall Hover. The Chinese name of Haval (哈弗; Hāfú) was initially romanised as 'Hover'.

The Haval name was first used by the Great Wall Haval CUV (initially romanized as Hover, later renamed to Haval H3), which was introduced in April 2005 as one of the early compact SUVs produced by local manufacturers. A successor to the Great Wall Safe, the Haval CUV adopts a more 'urban' design. Previously, Great Wall Motor (GWM) had mostly relied on pickup trucks and off-road-oriented SUVs. In September 2006, 500 units of Haval CUVs were exported to Italy for the first time, marking the first time a privately owned Chinese car company exported cars to Europe in large quantities.

The Great Wall Haval H6, which was introduced in 2011, gained popularity with its competitive price of about 100,000 yuan. Following its success, the Haval name was spun off as a standalone brand in March 2013 with its own logo, making it the second brand from GWM after the original Great Wall brand. The H6 family quickly branched out with a coupe SUV version, a diesel version, and four-wheel drive.

Since 2017, the Haval brand has been divided into the Red Label and Blue Label sub-brand, which uses red and blue logos respectively. Changes between the sub-brands are done in exterior styling, interior layout and materials, and are marketed through different dealership networks. The strategy was abandoned in 2019, when the Haval logo was reverted to black. In 2018, Haval introduced their F-series models that targeted younger customers. These models, such as the F5 and F7, adopted more streamlined designs.

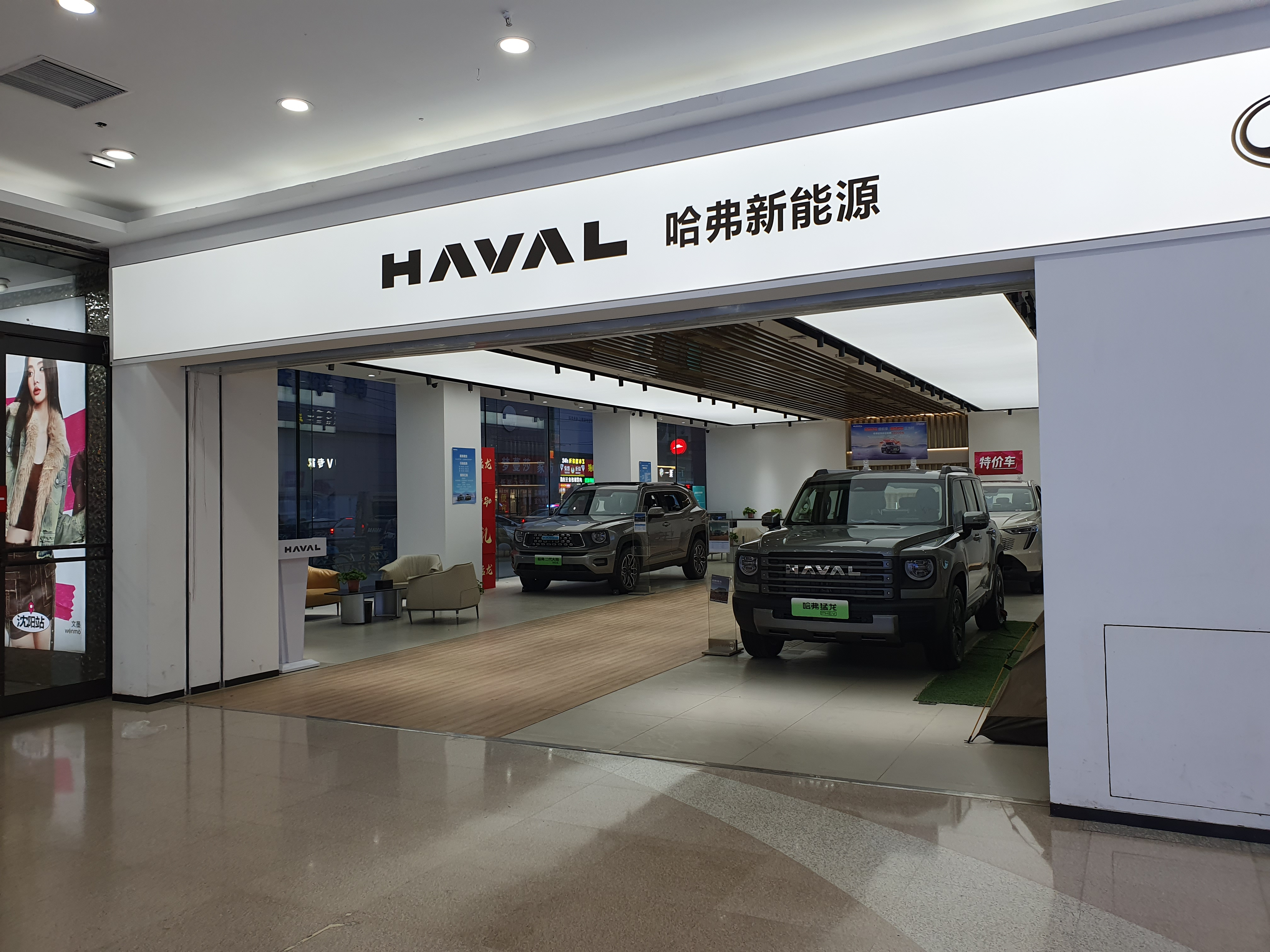
A Haval NEV showroom in a department store in Shenyang, China, 2024

By 2018, Haval has ranked first in China's SUV sales for nine consecutive years. The brand produced its 5 millionth vehicle in January 2019. At the same time, GWM founder Wei Jianjun outlined Haval's 5-2-1 globalization strategy, which means in five years the brand will achieve annual sales of 2 million and become the world's number one SUV brand.

In August 2022, for the first time, Haval introduced its new logo. Haval's new logo is made up of the brand name in capital letters, with a modern, angular design. The letters "A" and "V" have a triangular shape, giving the logo a dynamic and technological aspect.

=== Leadership ===
- Wen Fei (2020–2021)
- Li Xiaorui (2021–2023)
- Zhao Yongpo (2023–present)

== Markets ==
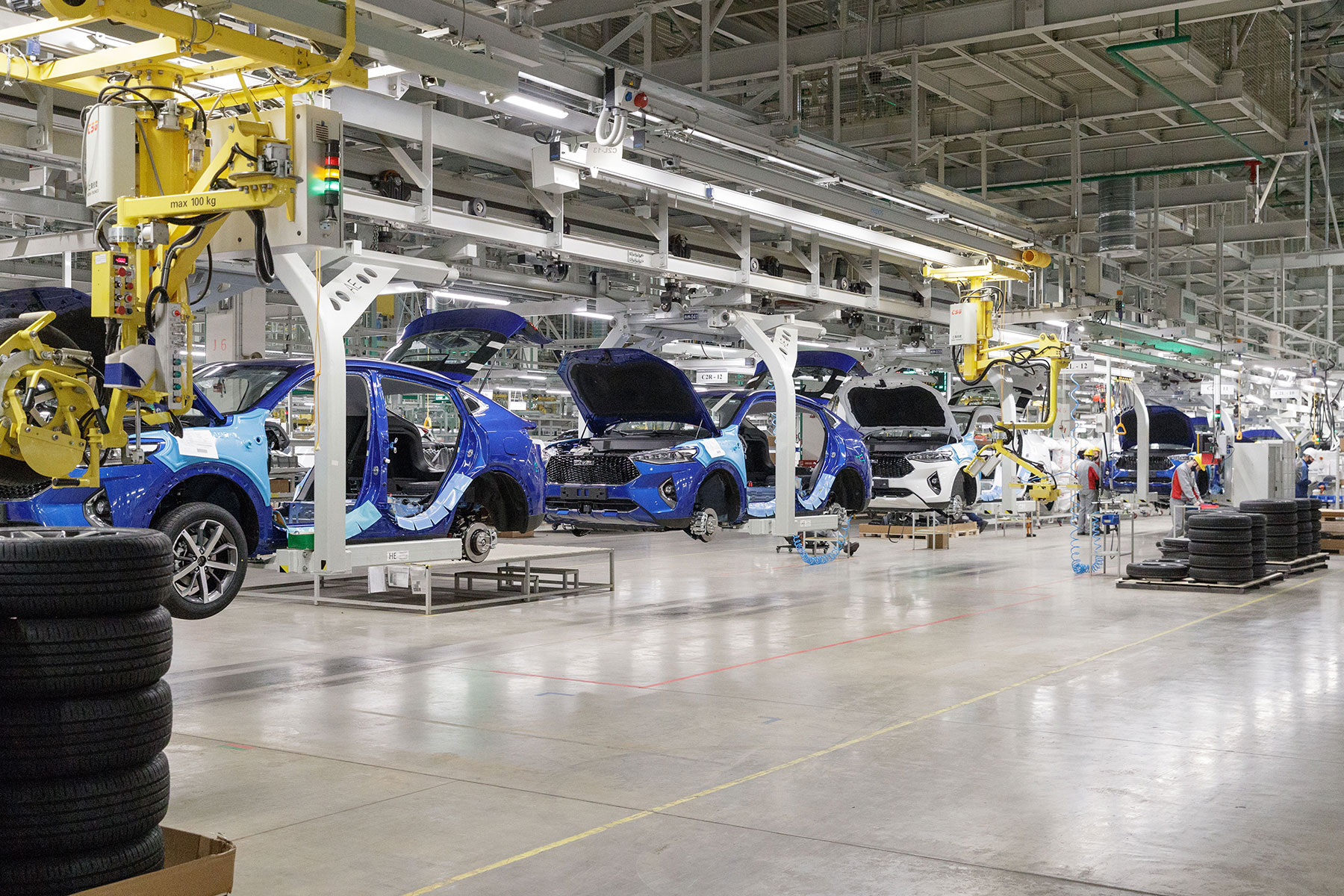
Assembly line at the Haval manufacturing plant in Russia

The Haval brand has been marketed in Australia, Argentina, Brazil, Bangladesh, Barbados, Bulgaria, New Zealand, Russia, South Africa, United Kingdom, Benin, Tunisia, Côte d'Ivoire, Chile, Paraguay, Ecuador, Egypt, Guatemala, Bolivia, Peru, Malaysia, Brunei, Saudi Arabia, México and the Philippines (since 2023), Zimbabwe, UAE, Pakistan, Iraq, Iran and other countries.

Haval entered the Australian market in March 2015 by introducing the H2, H8 and H9. Its Australian dealer network is 15 nationwide as of 2017, growing from four dealers at the brand's Australian launch in 2015. A further 10 dealers are expected to join the fold by the beginning of 2018 and Haval has grown its number of dealerships to 68 as of February 2024.

In June 2019, Haval started producing the F7 and H9 in Russia at its plant in the Uzlovaya industrial park in the Tula region.

In August 2025, Haval started producing the H6, H6 GT and H9 in Iracemapolis plant in São Paulo state in Brazil.

== Products ==
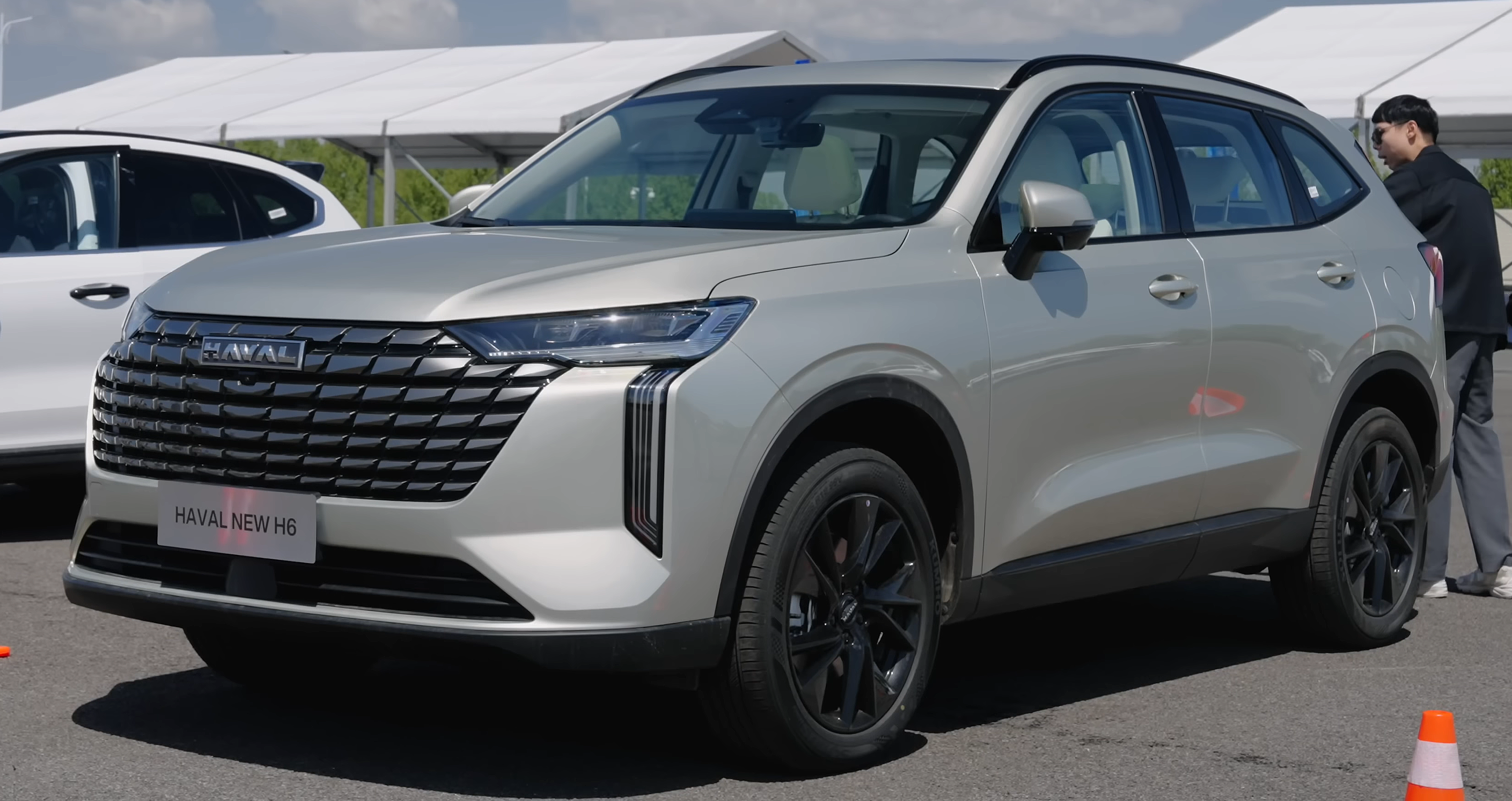
Haval H6

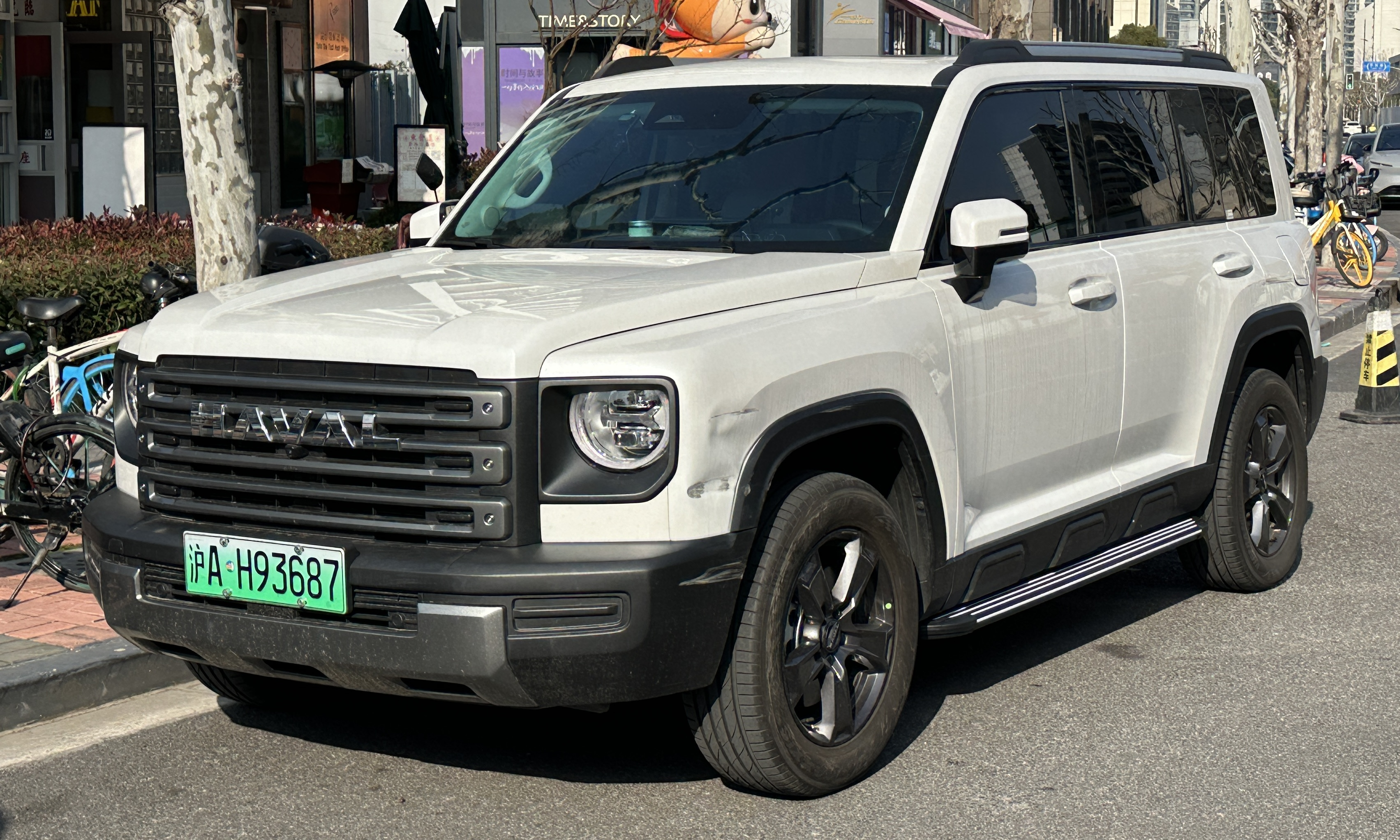
Haval Raptor

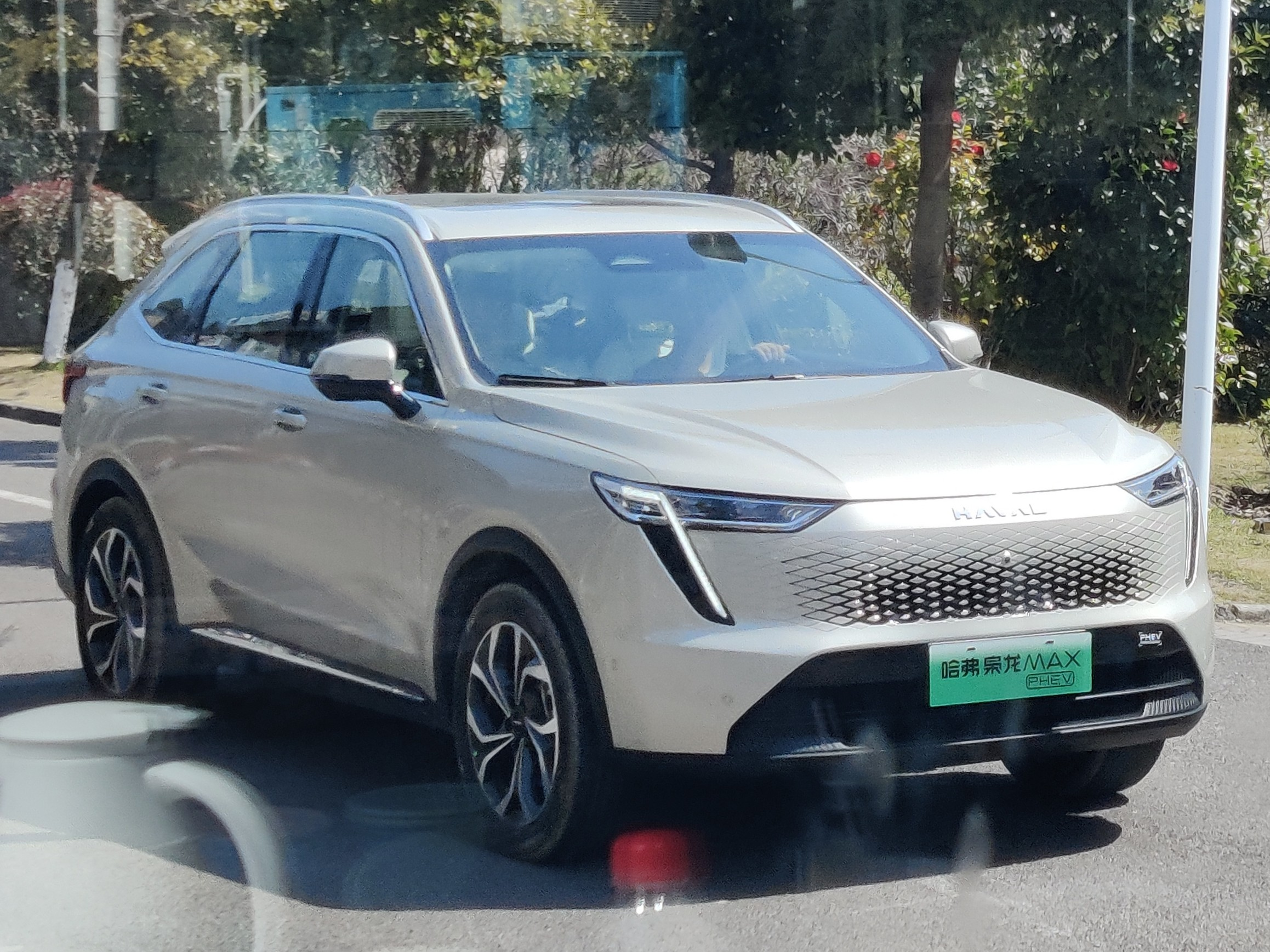
Haval Xiaolong Max

== Sales ==
Year	Global sales	China	Russia	Brazil	Saudi Arabia	South Africa	Thailand	Australia
2013	208,652							
2014	382,071							
2015	640,200		2,865			428		
2016	789,164					357		
2017	849,554		1,894			47		
2018	766,062		3,213			178		1,417
2019	769,454		12,284			109		3,107
2020	750,228		17,381			7,331		5,235
2021	770,008		39,126		5,622	7,532	795	18,384
2022	616,550	527,988	33,642		5,072	11,401	7,044	25,042
2023	599,732	493,642	118,826	10,563		13,936	6,908	36,397

== See also ==
- Great Wall Motor
- Ora
- Tank
- Wey
- Automobile manufacturers and brands of China
- List of automobile manufacturers of China
