= Wey P8 =

Chinese automobile

WEY P8
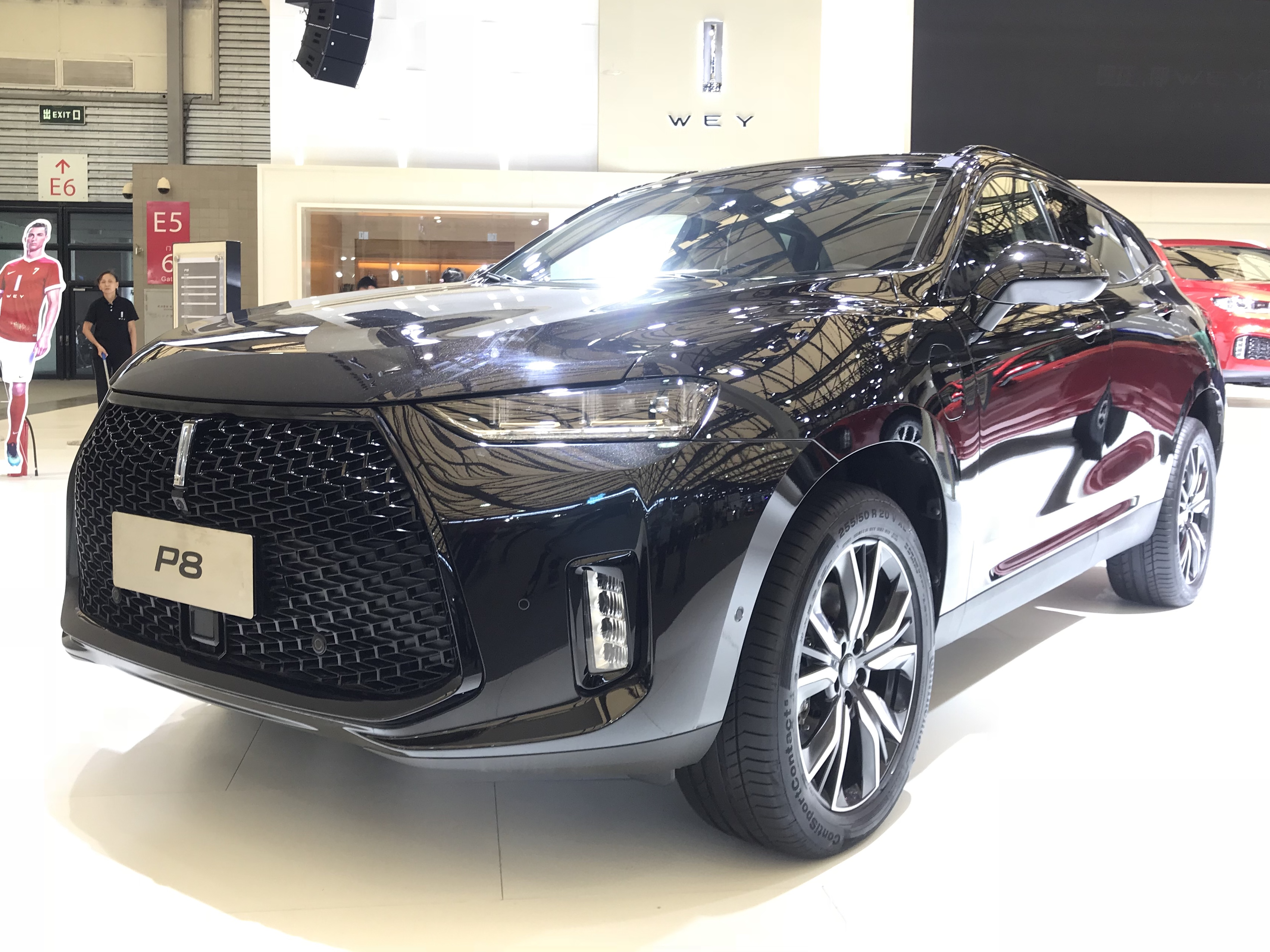
- WEY P8

Overview
- Manufacturer: Great Wall Motor
- Production: 2017–2020
- Assembly: China: Tianjin

Body and chassis
- Class: Mid-size crossover SUV
- Body style: 5-door SUV
- Layout: Front-engine, four-wheel-drive
- Related: WEY VV7; WEY VV5; Haval F5; Haval H6

Powertrain
- Engine: Petrol plug-in hybrid: 2.0 L GW4C20A I4 turbo
- Electric motor: 85 kW (114 bhp) Electric Motor
- Transmission: 6-speed DCT
- Hybrid drivetrain: Plug-in hybrid
- Range: 600 kilometres (373 mi)
- Electric range: 50 kilometres (31 mi)

Dimensions
- Wheelbase: 2,950 mm (116.1 in)
- Length: 4,760 mm (187.4 in)
- Width: 1,931 mm (76.0 in)
- Height: 1,655 mm (65.2 in)

The WEY P8 is a mid-size crossover SUV produced by Great Wall Motor under the premium brand, WEY, and is essentially the plug-in hybrid version of the WEY VV7.

== Overview ==
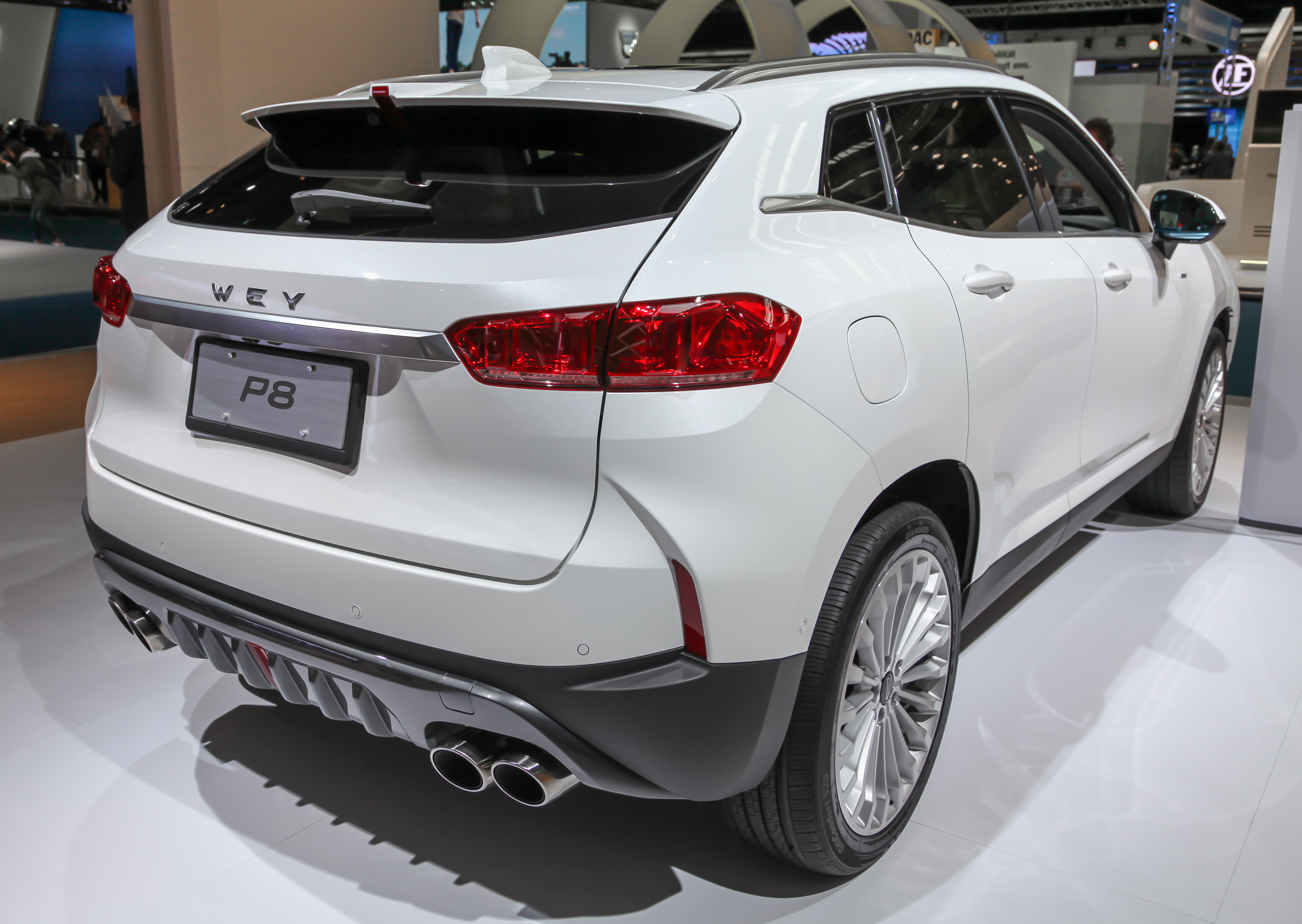
WEY P8 rear

The P8 was launched in 2018 producing 340 hp and 524 Nm of torque with prices ranging from 259,800 to 279,800 yuan.

WEY claimed an acceleration of 0–100 kilometres per hour (0–62 mph) in 6.5 seconds, a 50 kilometres (31 mi) electric range, a 600 kilometres (370 mi) combined range, and a fuel consumption of 2.3 liters per 100 kilometers.

As of July 2018, rumors told of a fastback version called the WEY P8 GT PHEV planned to be launched with similar performance as the regular WEY P8.

== WEY P8 GT ==
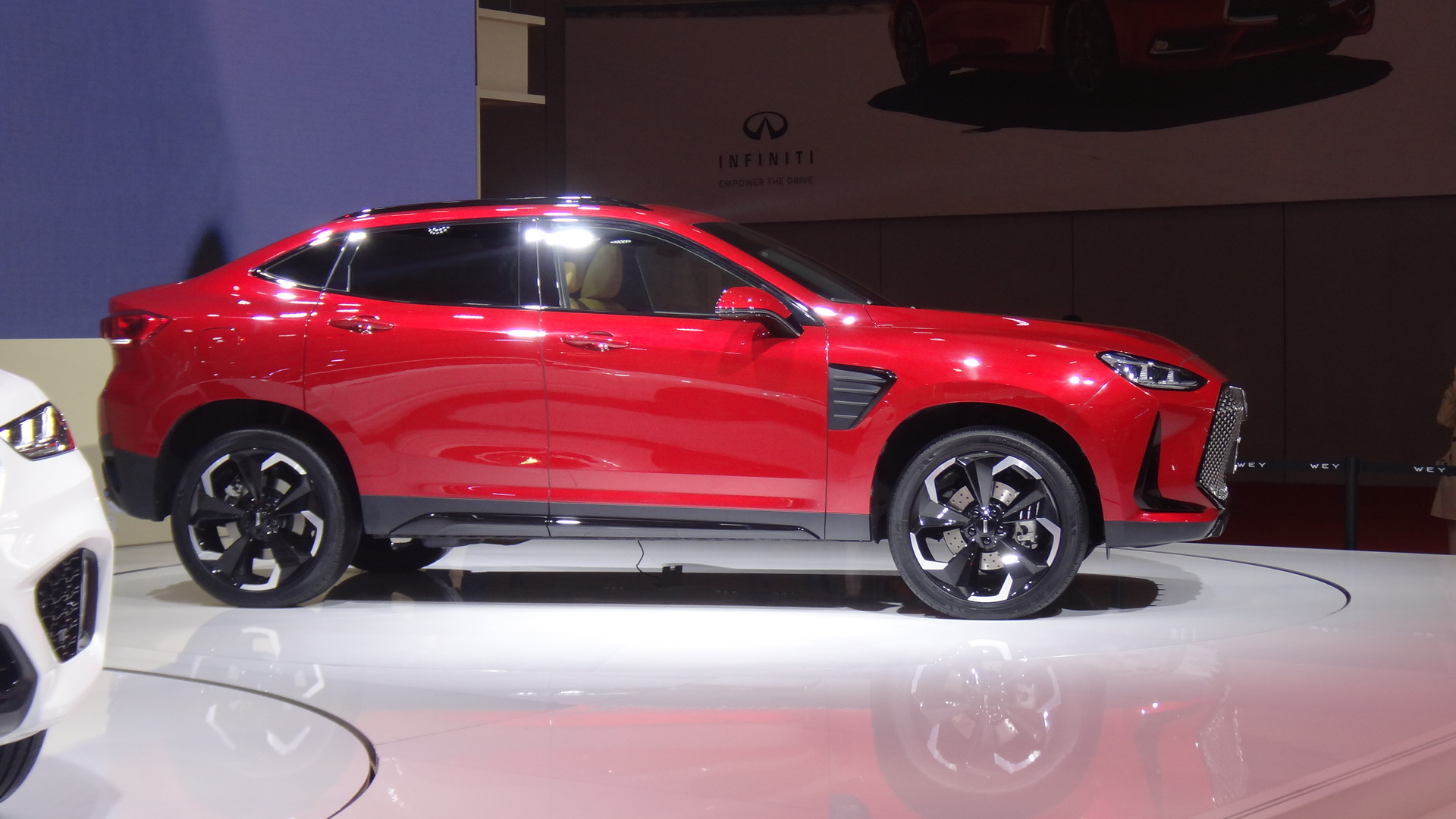
WEY P8 GT side

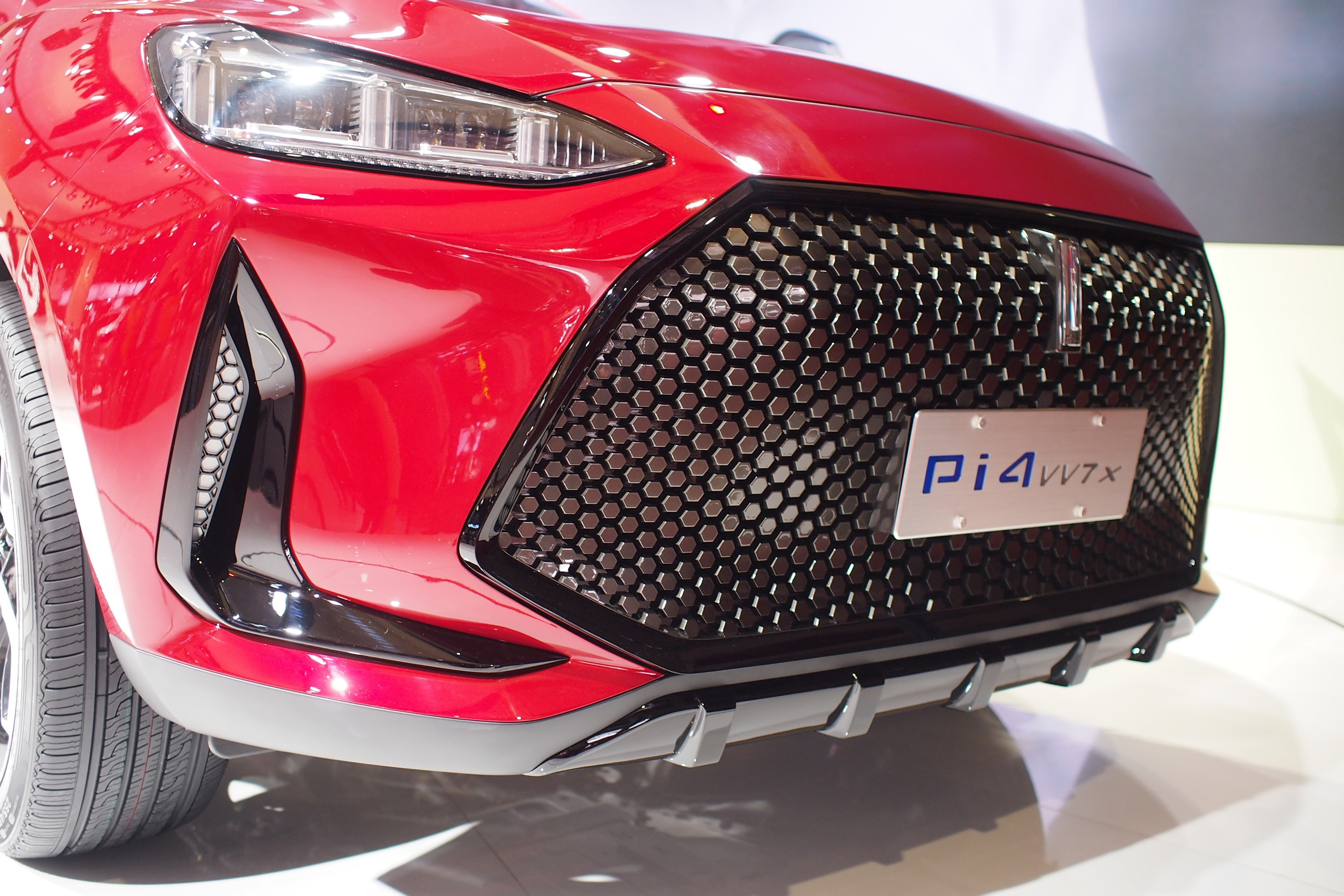
WEY P8 GT front details

Originally launched as the WEY Pi4 VV7x in 2017, the production version was launched in 2018 and was renamed to WEY P8 GT, and is essentially the fastback version of the WEY P8 while featuring a redesigned front fascia and different headlamps.
