= Wey VV6 =

Chinese automobile

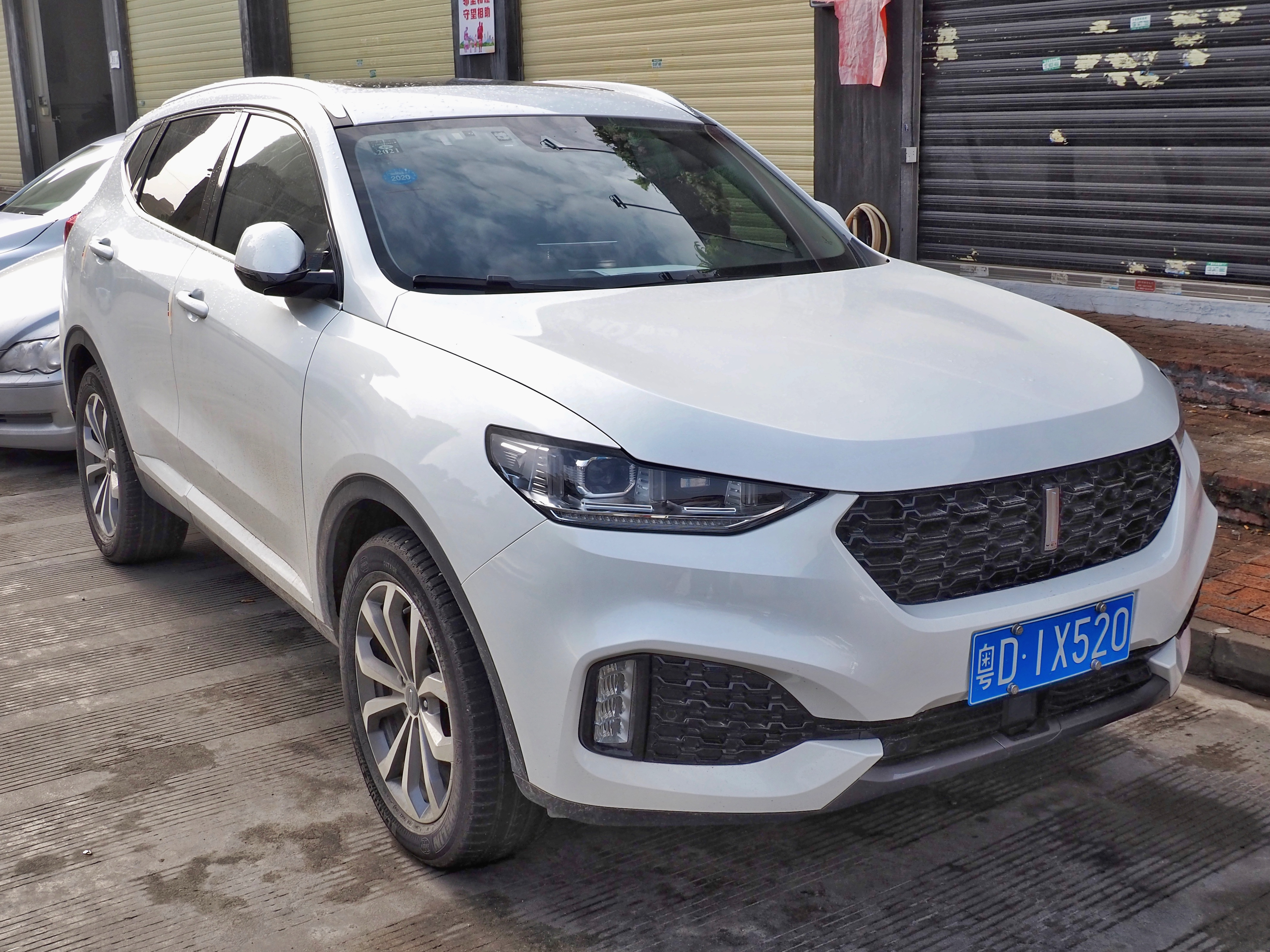

Overview
- Manufacturer: Great Wall Motor
- Production: 2018–2021
- Assembly: Tianjin, China (GWM Tianjin Branch)

Body and chassis
- Class: Compact luxury crossover SUV
- Body style: 5-door CUV
- Layout: Front-engine, front-wheel-drive Front-engine, four-wheel-drive
- Related: Wey VV7; Haval H6

Powertrain
- Engine: 2.0 L GW4C20NT I4 turbo (gasoline)
- Transmission: 7-speed DCT

Dimensions
- Wheelbase: 2,680 mm (105.5 in)
- Length: 4,625 mm (182.1 in)
- Width: 1,860 mm (73.2 in)
- Height: 1,720 mm (67.7 in)

The Wey VV6 is a compact luxury crossover SUV produced by Great Wall Motor under the premium brand, Wey.

== Overview ==
The VV6 shares the same platform as the Wey VV5 and the second generation Haval H6. Prices of the VV6 ranges from 148,000 to 175,000 yuan.

The Wey VV6 is powered by the 2.0 liter inline-4 turbo engine producing 227hp from the VV5, with the engine mated to a 7-speed dual-clutch transmission also shared with the VV5.

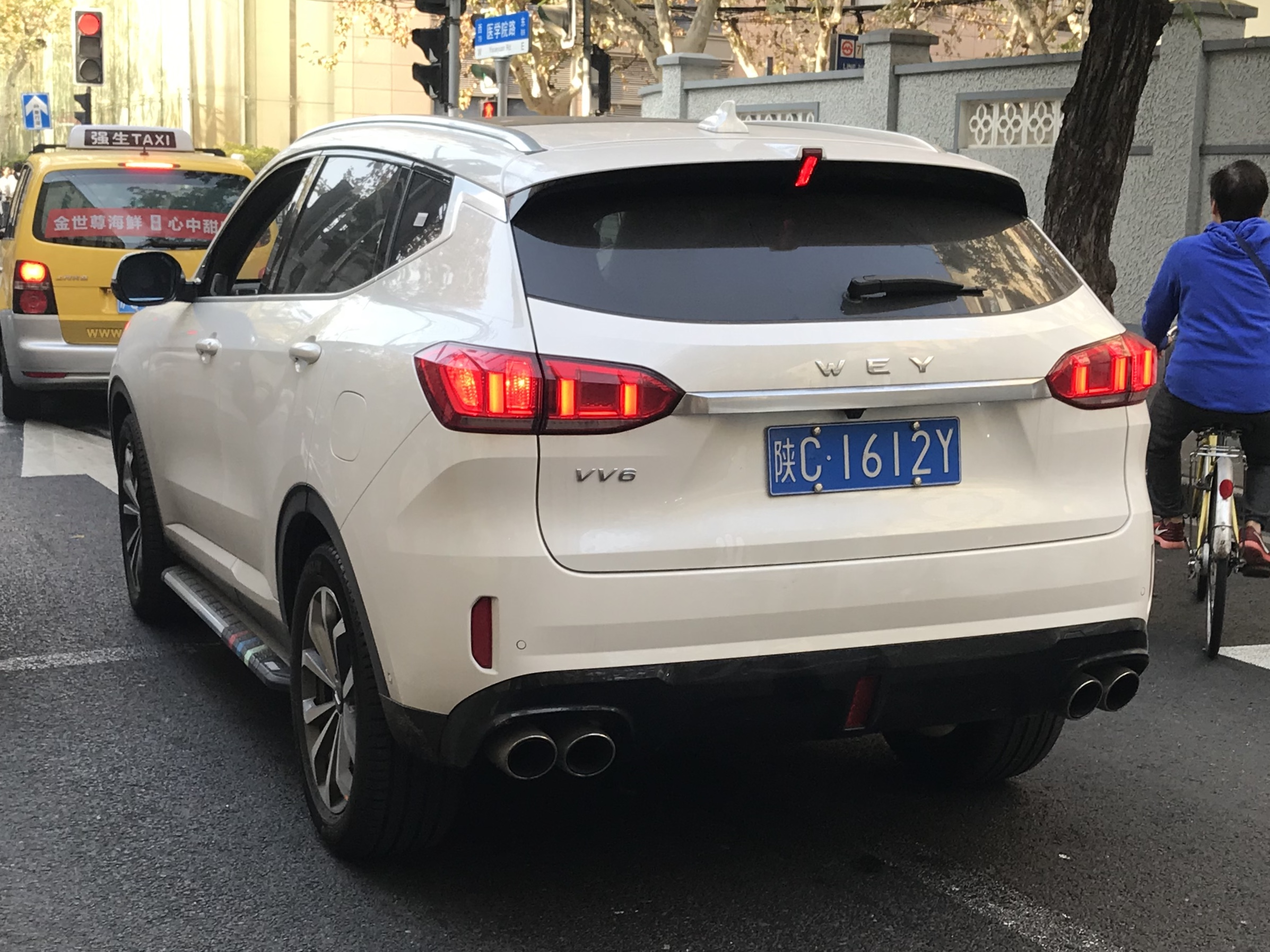
Wey VV6 rear

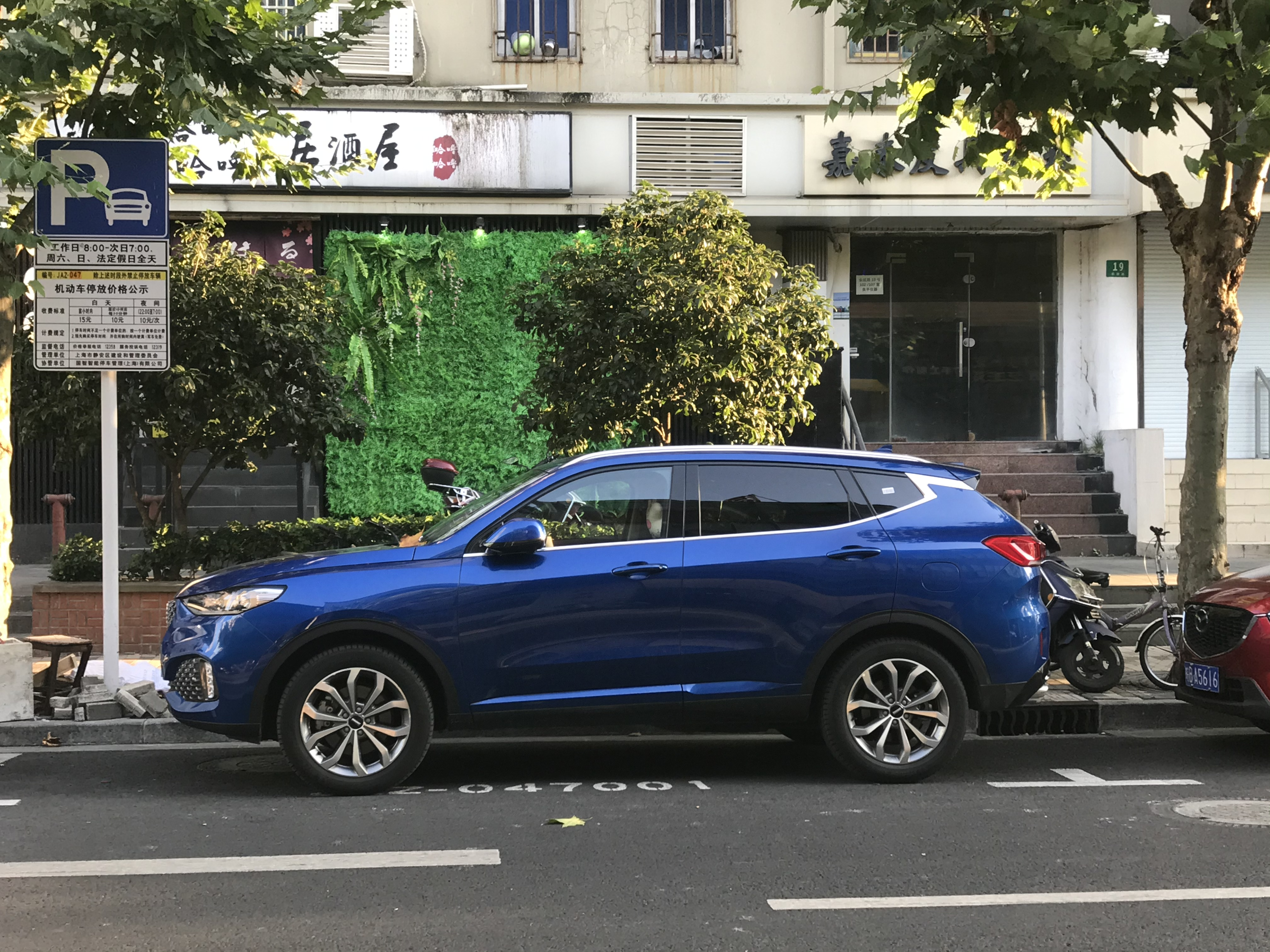
Wey VV6 side
