= Haval F5 =

Chinese automobile

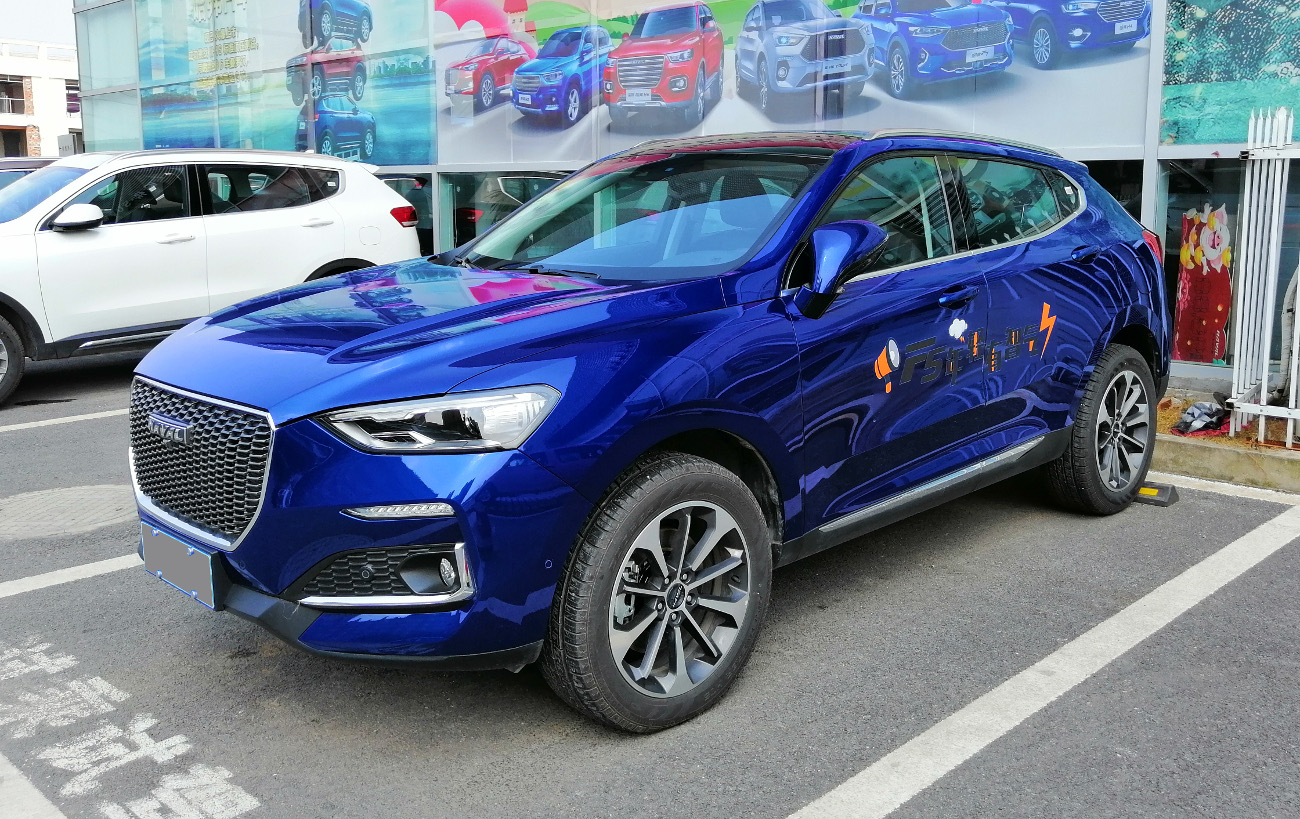
- Haval F5

Overview
- Manufacturer: Great Wall Motor
- Also called: Great Wall Haval F5
- Production: 2018–2020
- Assembly: China: Tianjin (Great Wall Motor Co., Ltd. Tianjin Branch)

Body and chassis
- Class: Subcompact CSUV
- Body style: 5-door wagon
- Layout: FF
- Related: Haval H6; WEY VV5

Powertrain
- Engine: 1.5 L GW4B15 I4 (turbo petrol); 2.0 L GW4C20NT I4 (turbo petrol)
- Transmission: 7-speed DCT

Dimensions
- Wheelbase: 2,680 mm (105.5 in)
- Length: 4,470 mm (176.0 in)
- Width: 1,857 mm (73.1 in)
- Height: 1,638 mm (64.5 in)

The Haval F5 is a compact crossover sport utility vehicle produced by the Chinese manufacturer Great Wall Motor from 2018 to 2020.

== First generation ==
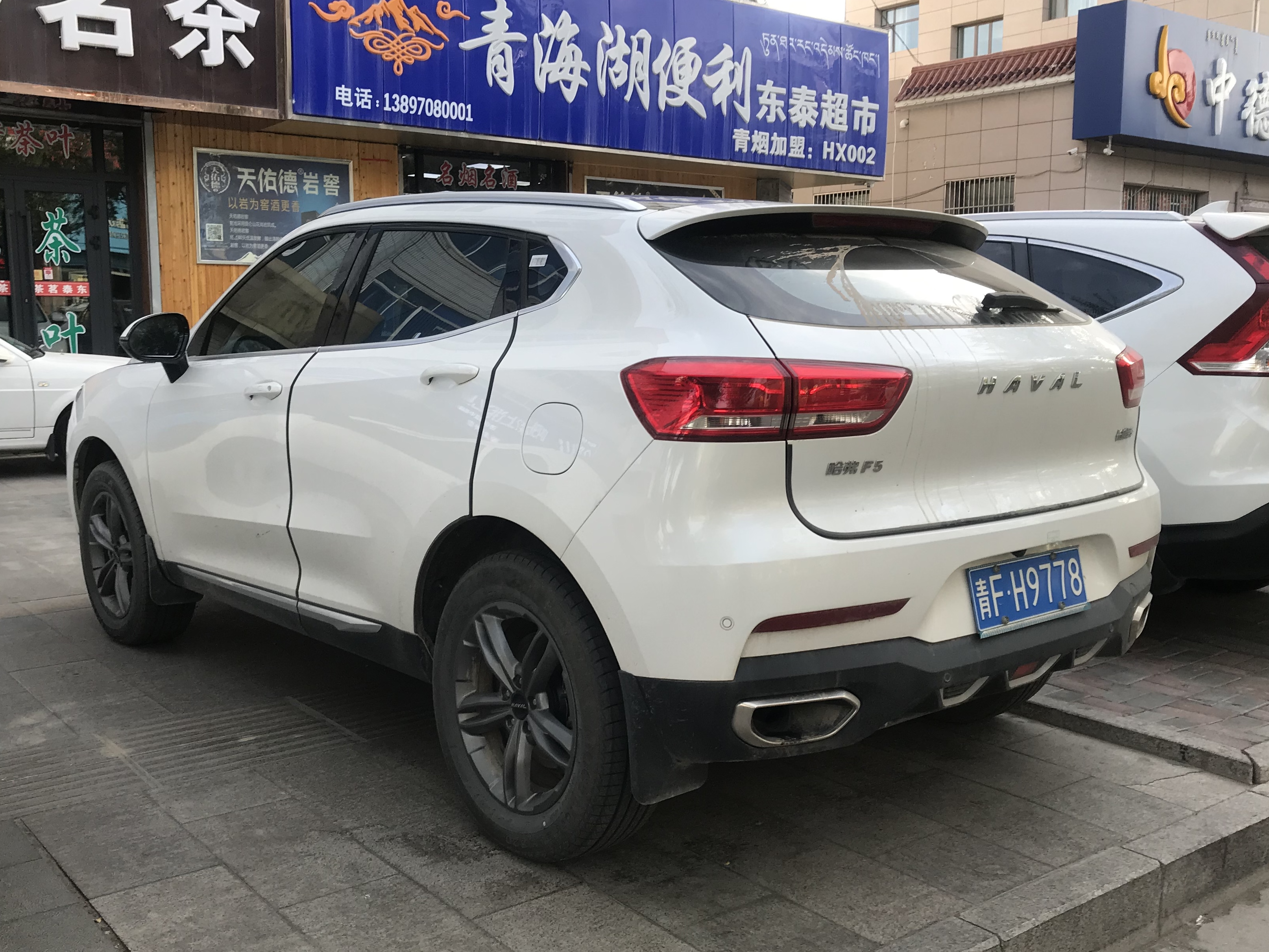
Haval F5 rear

The Haval F5 was originally previewed by the Haval Concept R shown at the 2015 Shanghai Auto Show alongside the Concept B. The two concepts was intended to show the dual-label design strategy of Haval at the time, with Concept R representing the Red Label line and Concept B representing the Blue Label line, featuring different styling that targets different customers. The Haval Concept R ultimately became the Haval F5 while the Concept B ultimately became the second generation Haval H6 Blue Label.

The production Haval F5 was based on the same platform as the Haval H6 and WEY VV5, with prices ranging from 100,000 yuan to 130,000 yuan.

The Haval F5 is powered by the GW4B15A 1.5-liter inline-4 turbo engine producing 126 kW (169 hp) at 5,000-5,600 rpm and 285 N⋅m (210 lb⋅ft) of torque at 1,400-3,000 rpm, with the engine mated to a 7-speed wet-type dual-clutch transmission.

== Second generation ==
As of November 2020, patent of the second generation Haval F5 broke out. The second generation model was updated in the same style as the third generation Haval H6 featuring a longer wheelbase and full width tail lamp. The additional potential name is Haval Kuanghuan. The updated model has a length of 4,450 mm (175 in), width of 1,841 mm (72.5 in), and height of 1,618 mm (63.7 in), with the wheelbase being 2,700 mm (110 in). The engine of the lower spec model that was seen is the GW4G15K 1.5-liter turbo engine producing 150 hp (110 kW).
