= Wey (marque) =

Chinese automotive marque

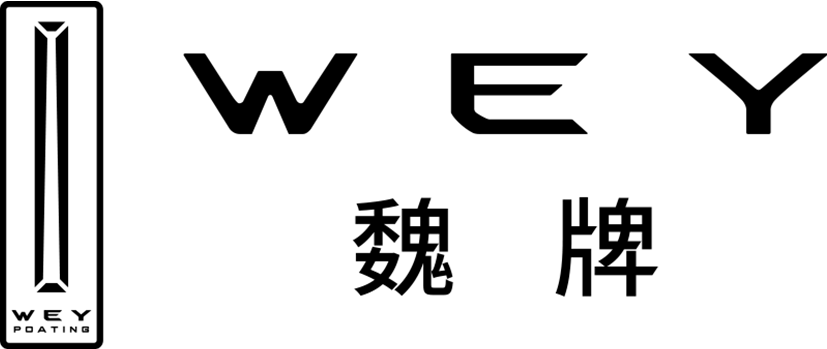
- Product type: Automotive marque
- Current owner: Great Wall Motors
- Country: China
- Introduced: 16 November 2016; 10 years ago
- Markets: Worldwide
- Ambassador: Feng Fuzhi (Wey brand CEO)
- Website: wey.com (Chinese) global.wey.com (English)

Chinese name
- Chinese: 魏牌新能源
- Hanyu Pinyin: Wèipái Xīnnéngyuán

Alternative Chinese name
- Chinese: 魏牌
- Hanyu Pinyin: Wèipái

Logo used until 2023

Wey (pronounced WAY; stylized in all caps; Chinese: 魏牌; pinyin: Wèipái) is an automotive marque owned by the Chinese automaker Great Wall Motors. Launched in 2016, the brand focused on premium crossovers and SUVs based on Haval models.

== History ==
The marque launched in November 2016 as an "accessible" luxury SUV brand. The name Wey is derived from Great Wall Motor chairman Wei Jianjun's surname.

At the end of 2022, the manufacturer announced its arrival in Germany and France.

=== Leadership ===
- Jens Steingraeber (2016–2018)
- Wei Jianjun (2018–2021)
- Zhao Yongpo (2021–2023)
- Chen Siying (2023–2025)
- Feng Fuzhi (2025–present)

== Products ==
=== Current ===
- Wey Gaoshan, MPV launched in 2023
- Wey Lanshan, full-size crossover SUV launched in 2023
- Wey Mocha, mid-size crossover SUV launched in 2021, in replacement for VV7
- Wey V8X, full-size crossover SUV launched in 2026
- Wey V9X, full-size crossover SUV launched in 2026
Wey Gaoshan

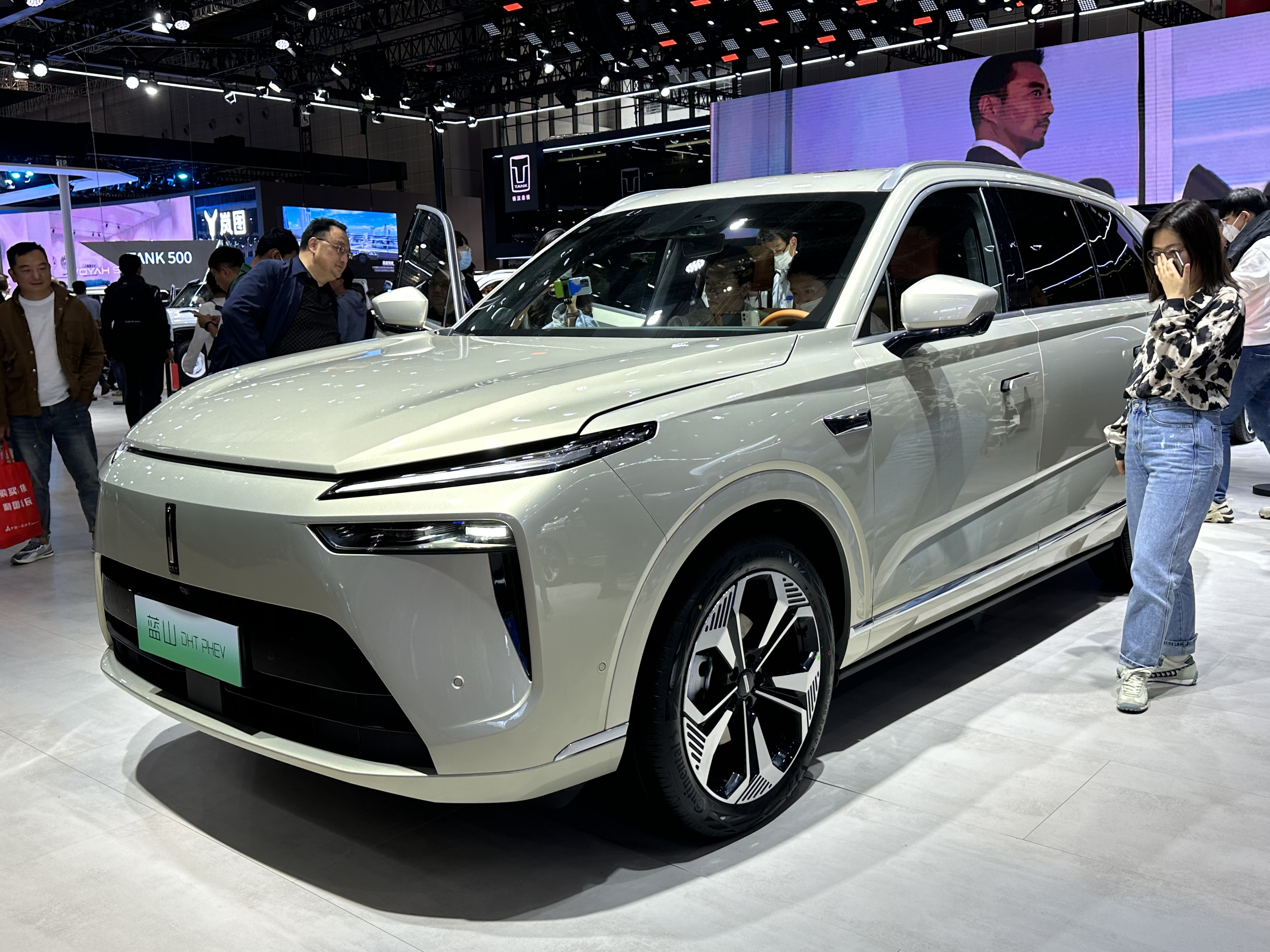
Wey Lanshan

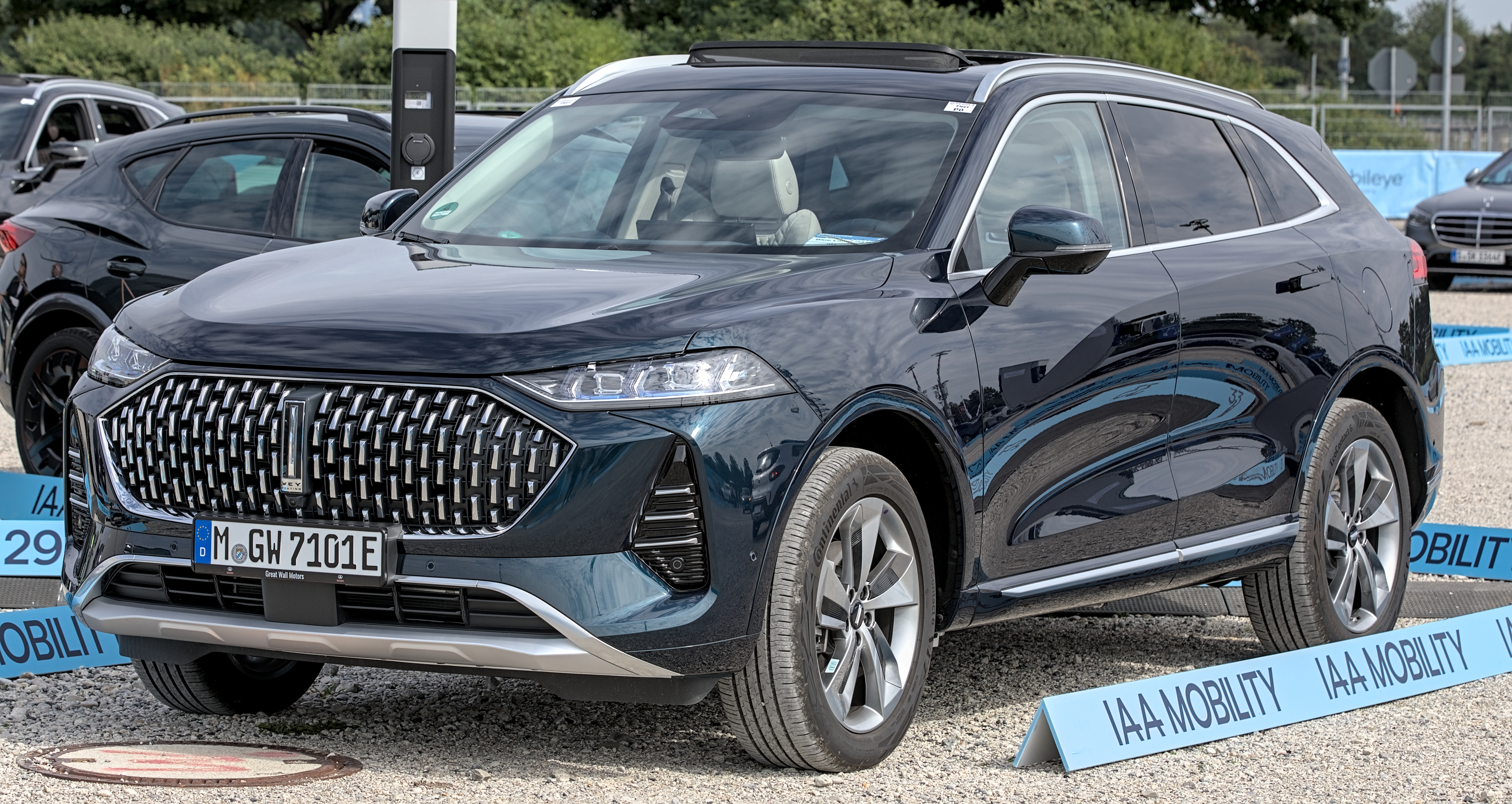
Wey Mocha

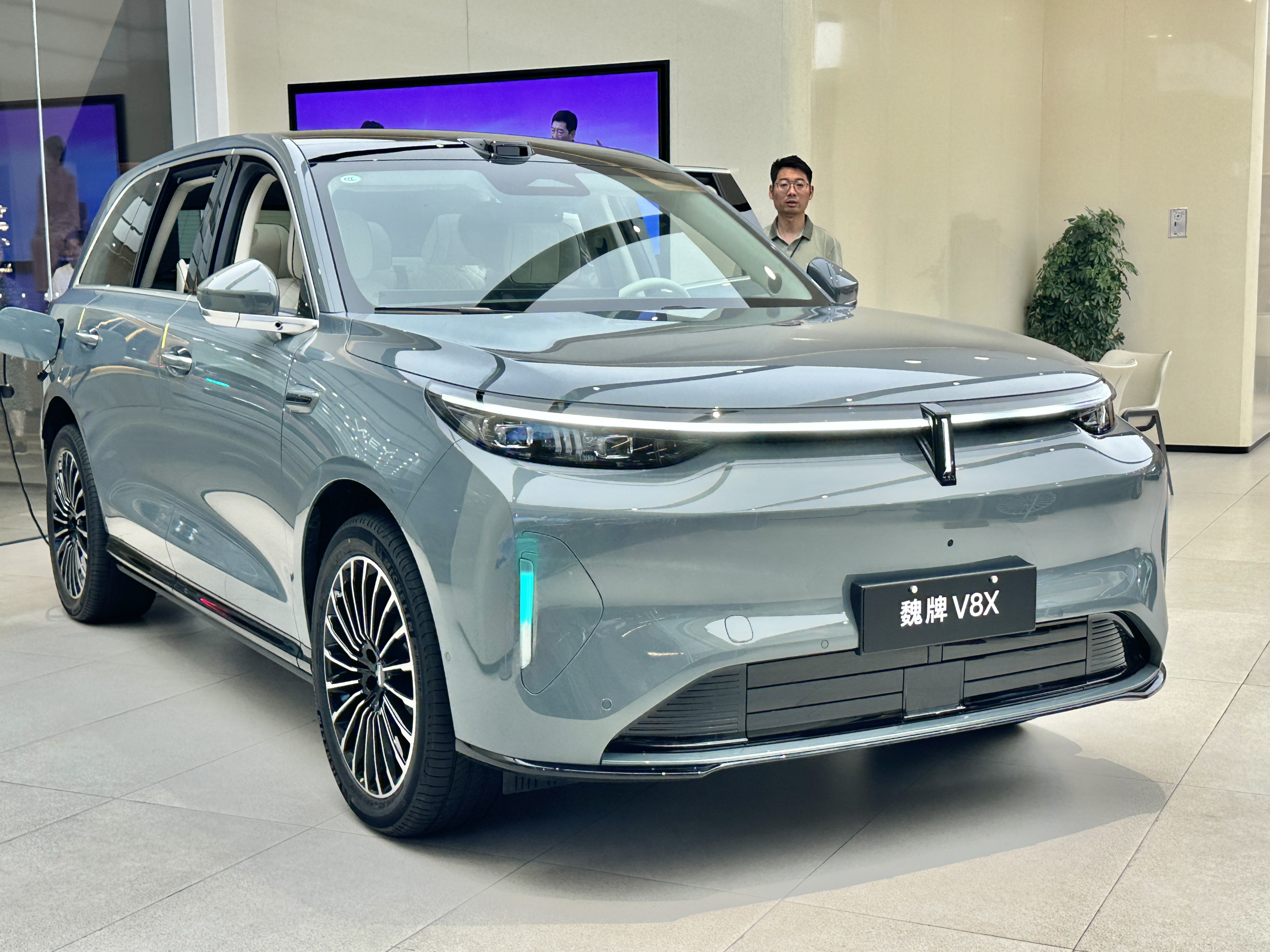
Wey V8X

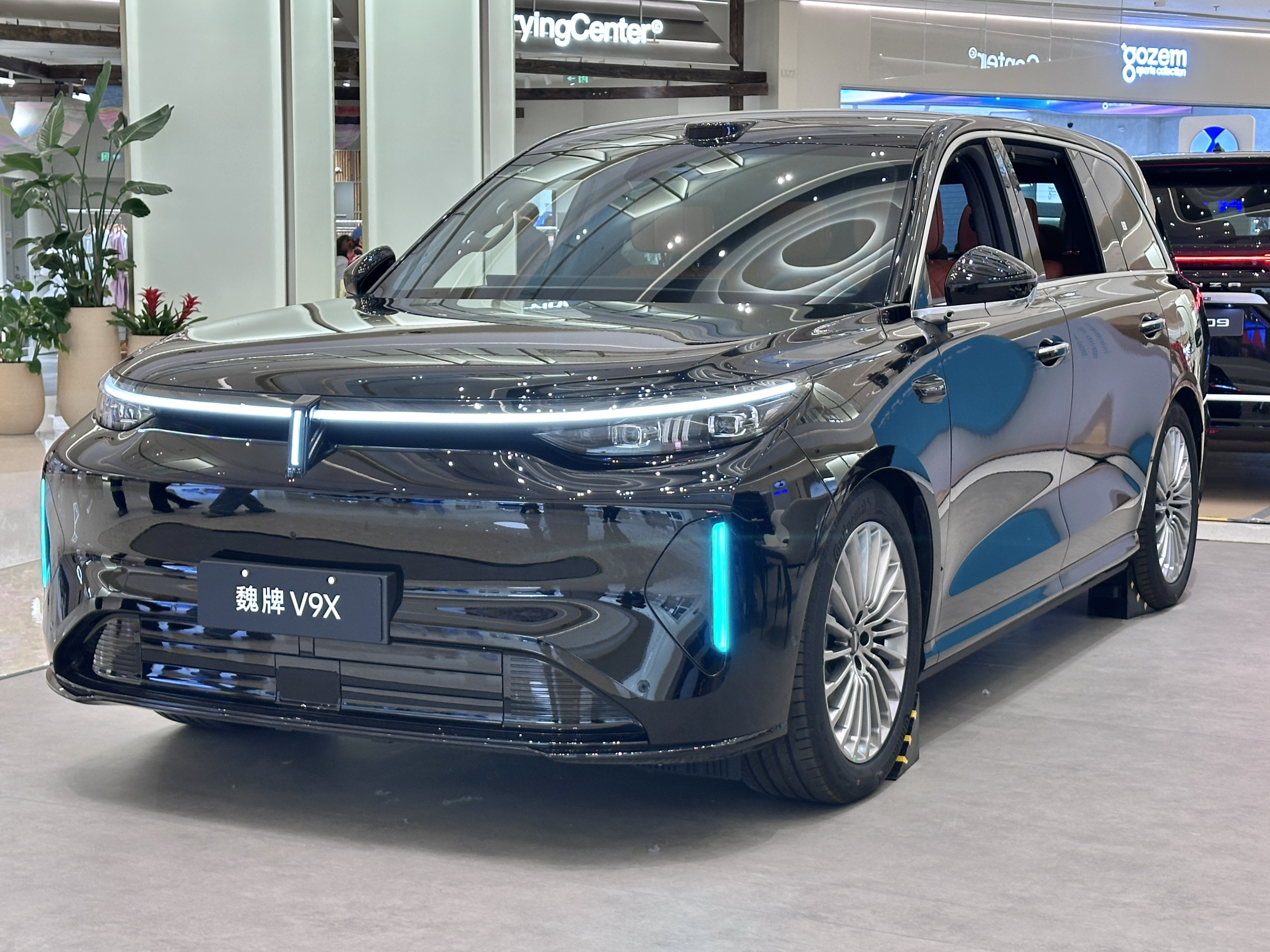
Wey V9X

=== Discontinued ===
- Wey P8, mid-size crossover SUV (2018–2020)
- Wey Tank 300, compact off-road SUV launched in 2020, and branched off towards the Tank brand as its first model
- Wey Latte, compact crossover SUV launched in 2021, in replacement for VV5 (2021–2025)
- Wey Macchiato, compact crossover SUV launched in 2021, in replacement for VV5 (2021–2023)
- Wey VV5, compact crossover SUV launched in late 2017 (2017–2021)
- Wey VV6, compact crossover SUV sized between VV7 and VV5, launched in 2018 (2018–2021)
- Wey VV7 and VV7 GT, mid-size crossover SUV launched in early 2017 (2017–2021)
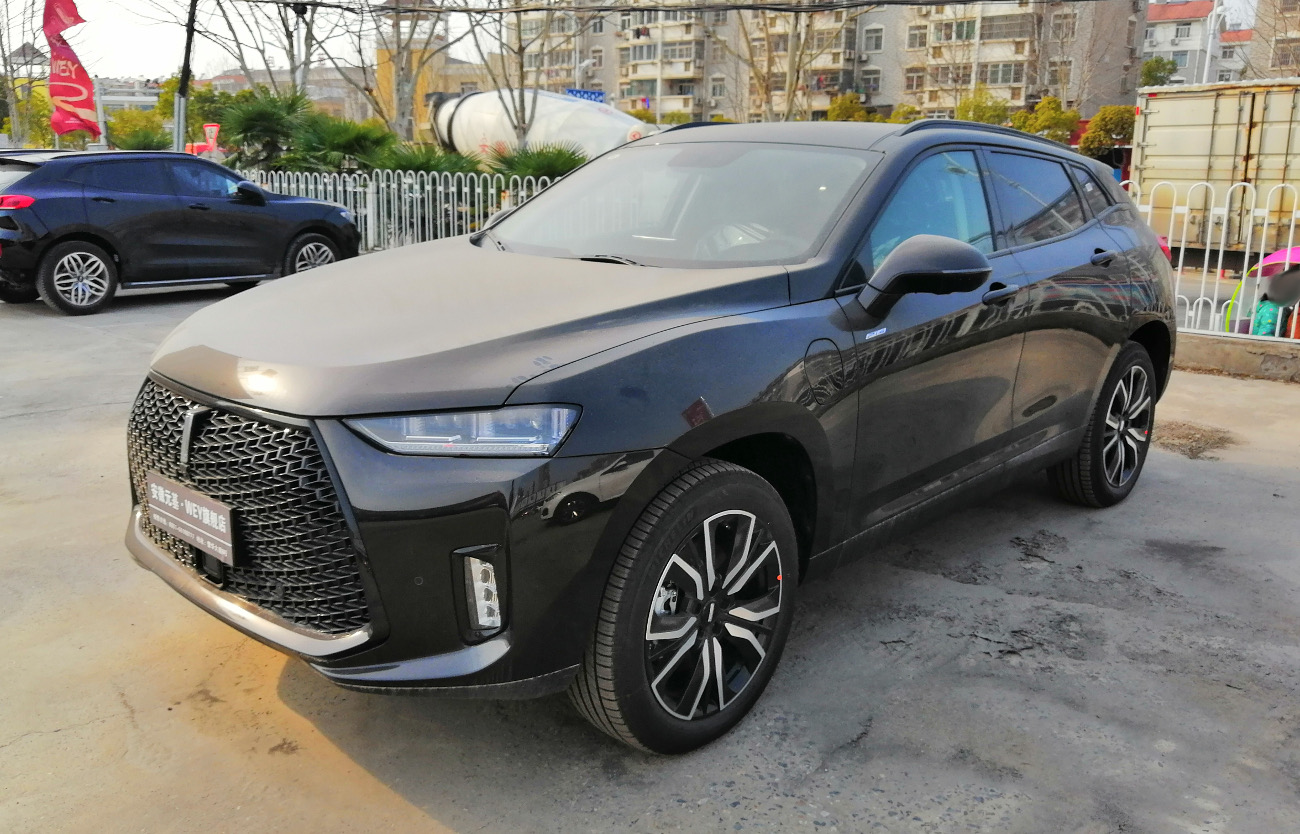
Wey P8

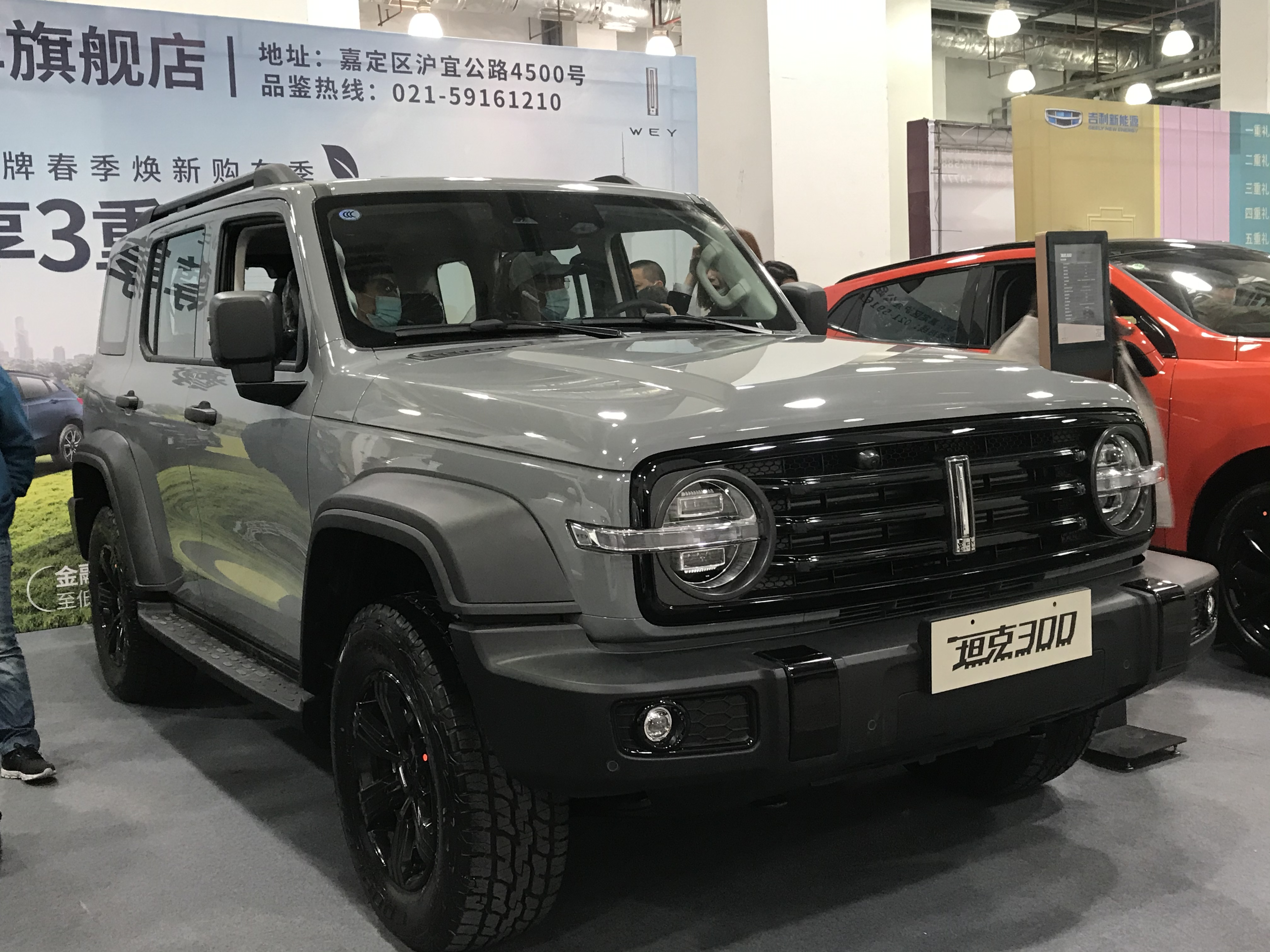
Wey Tank 300

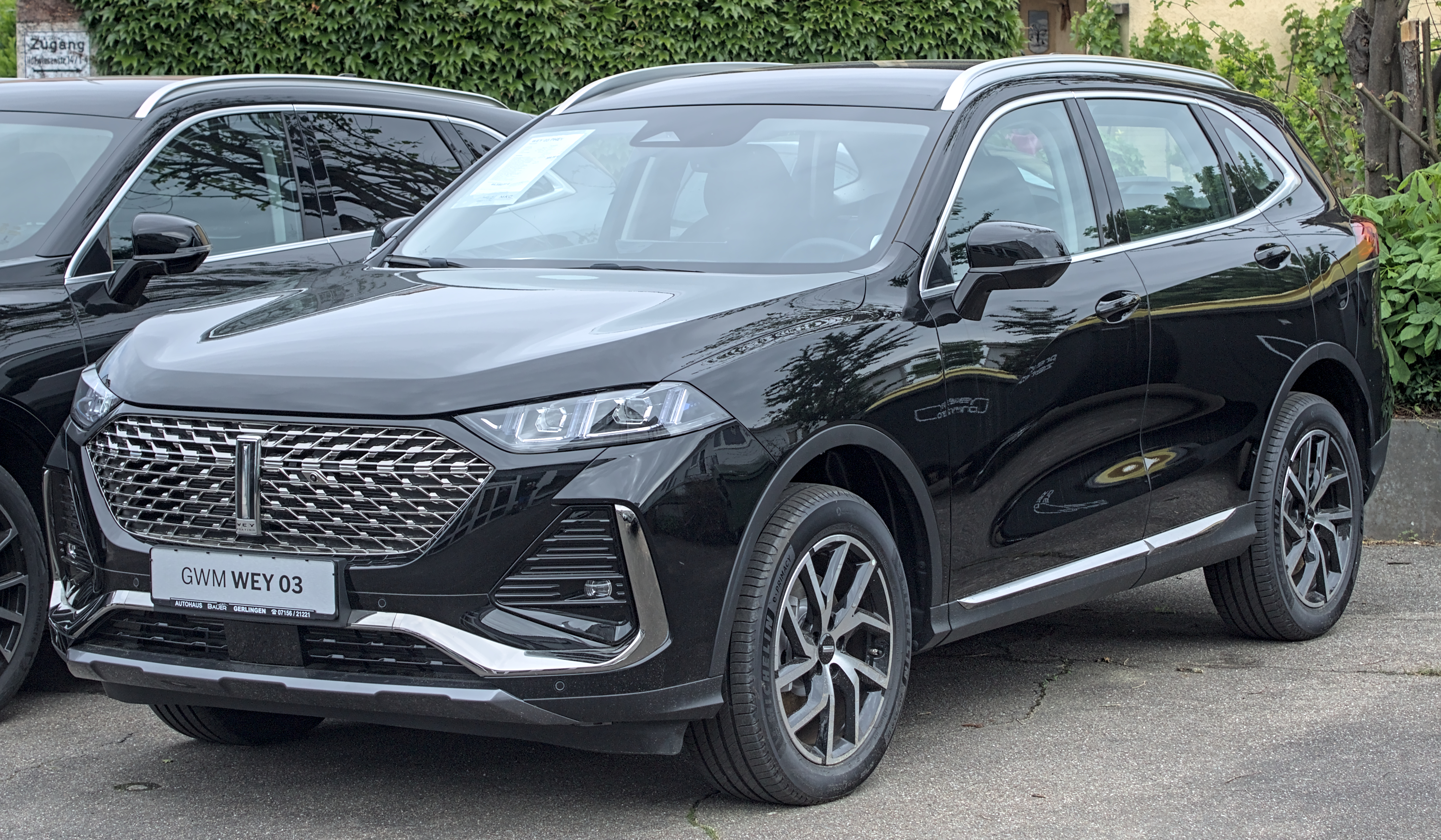
Wey Latte

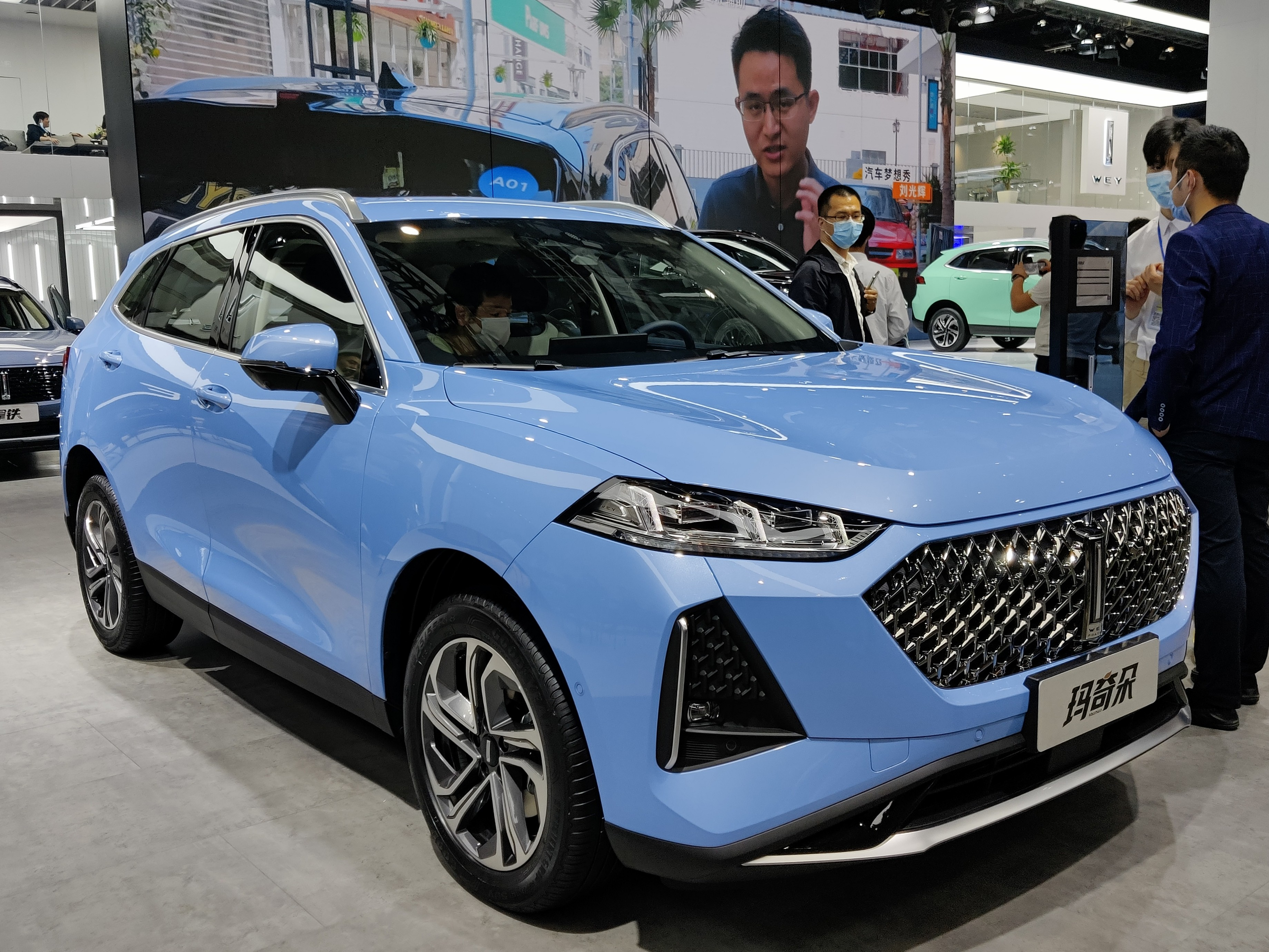
Wey Macchiato

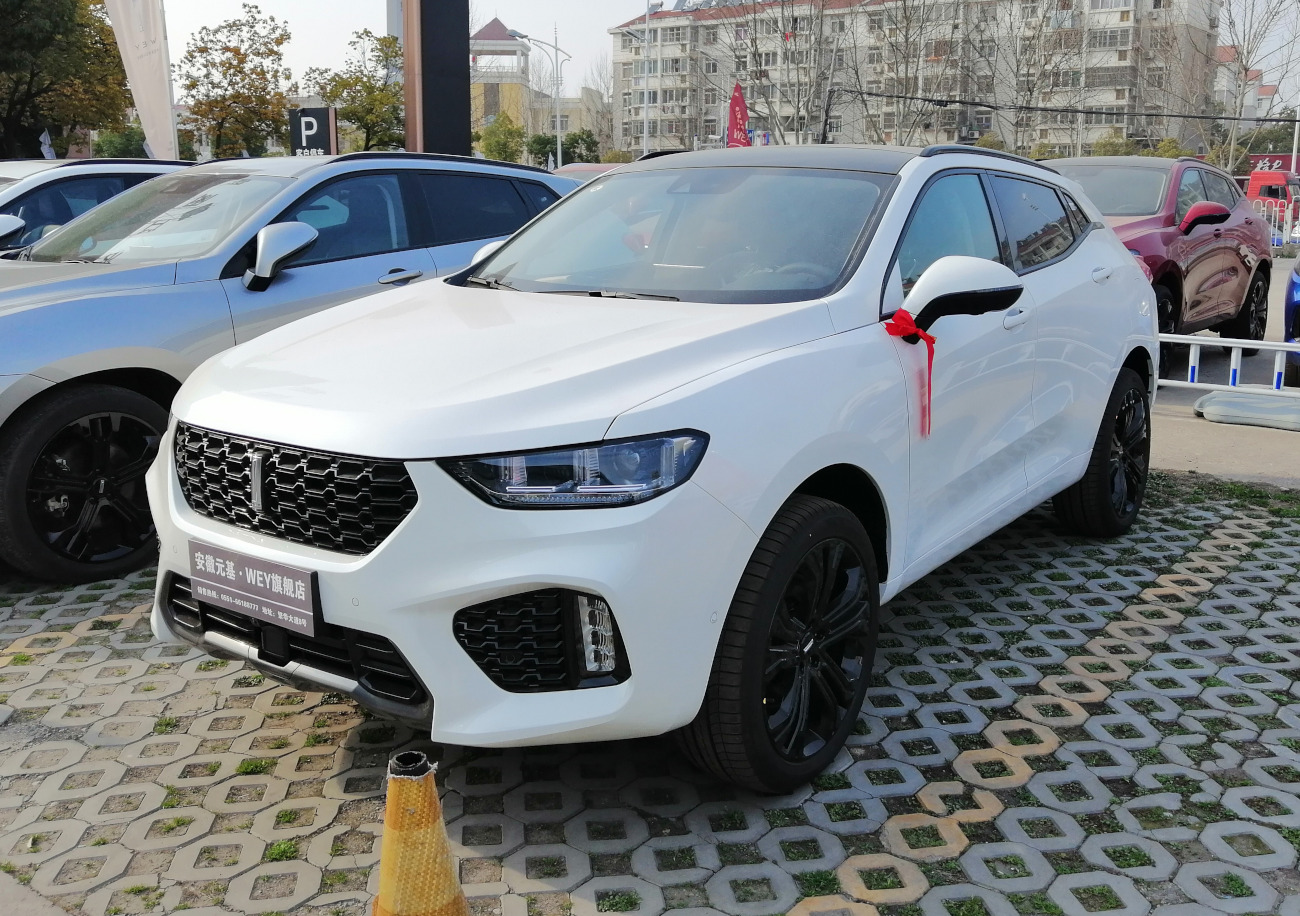
Wey VV5

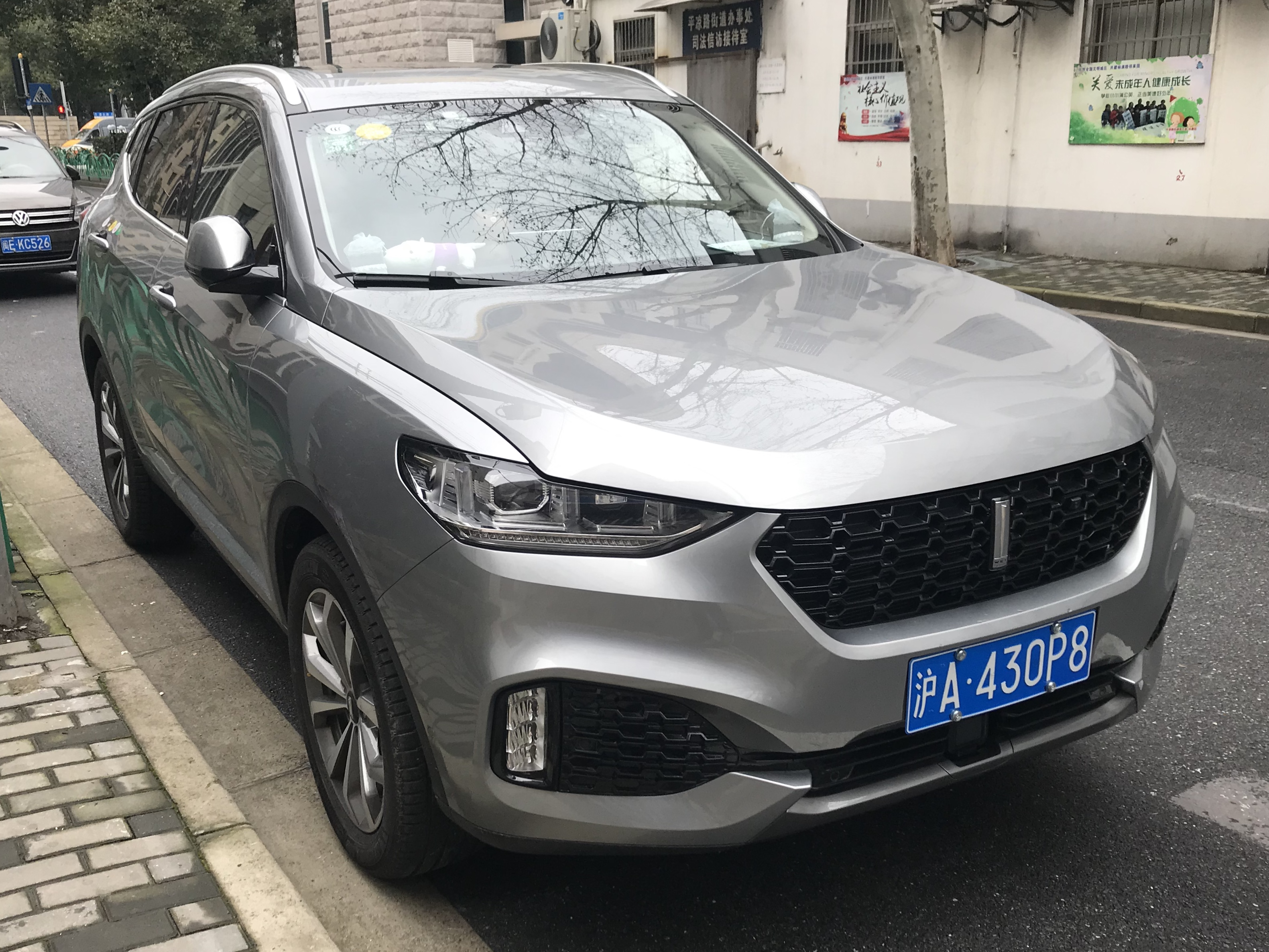
Wey VV6

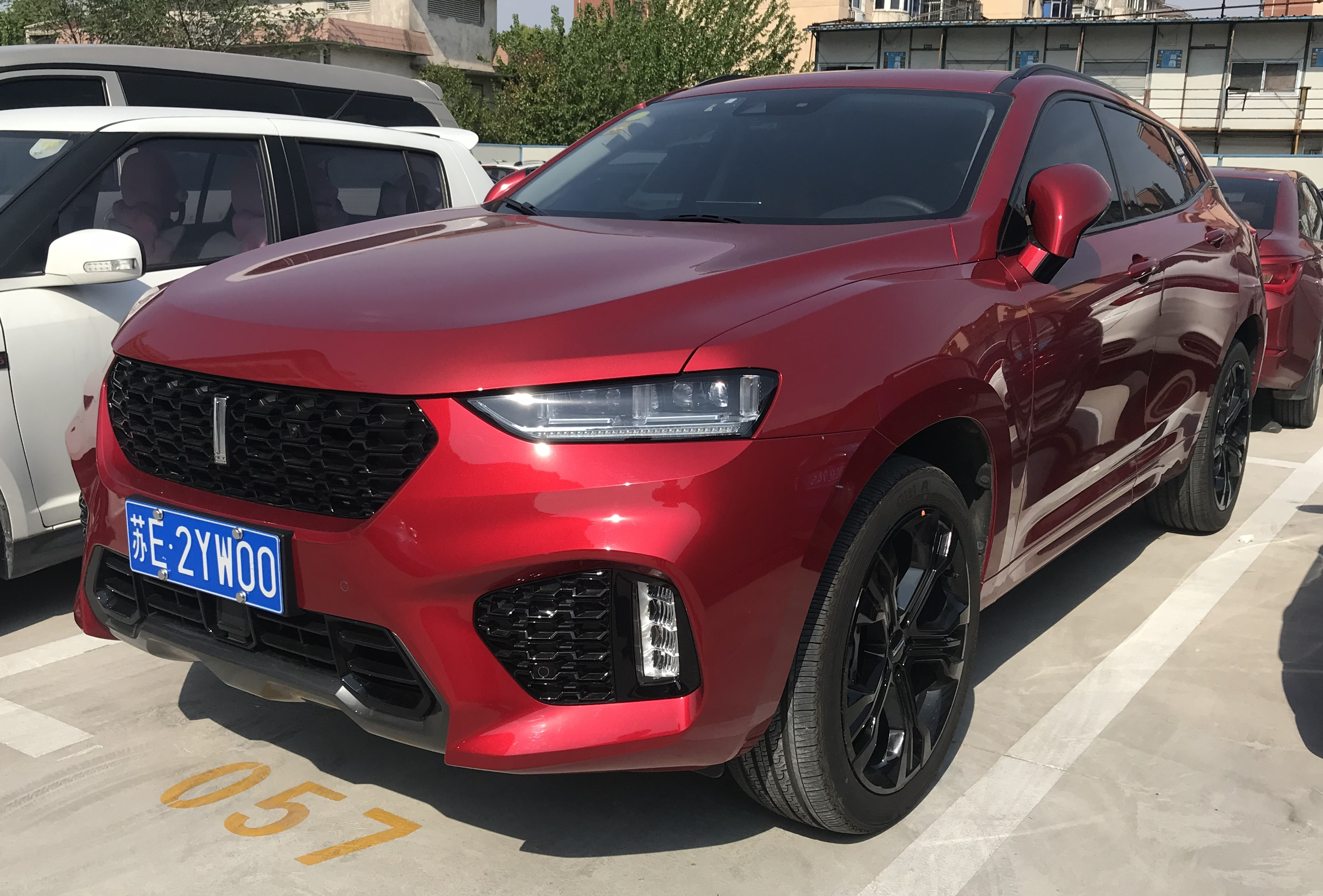
Wey VV7

== See also ==
- Automobile manufacturers and brands of China
- List of automobile manufacturers of China
