= Wey VV7 =

Crossover SUV from China

WEY VV7
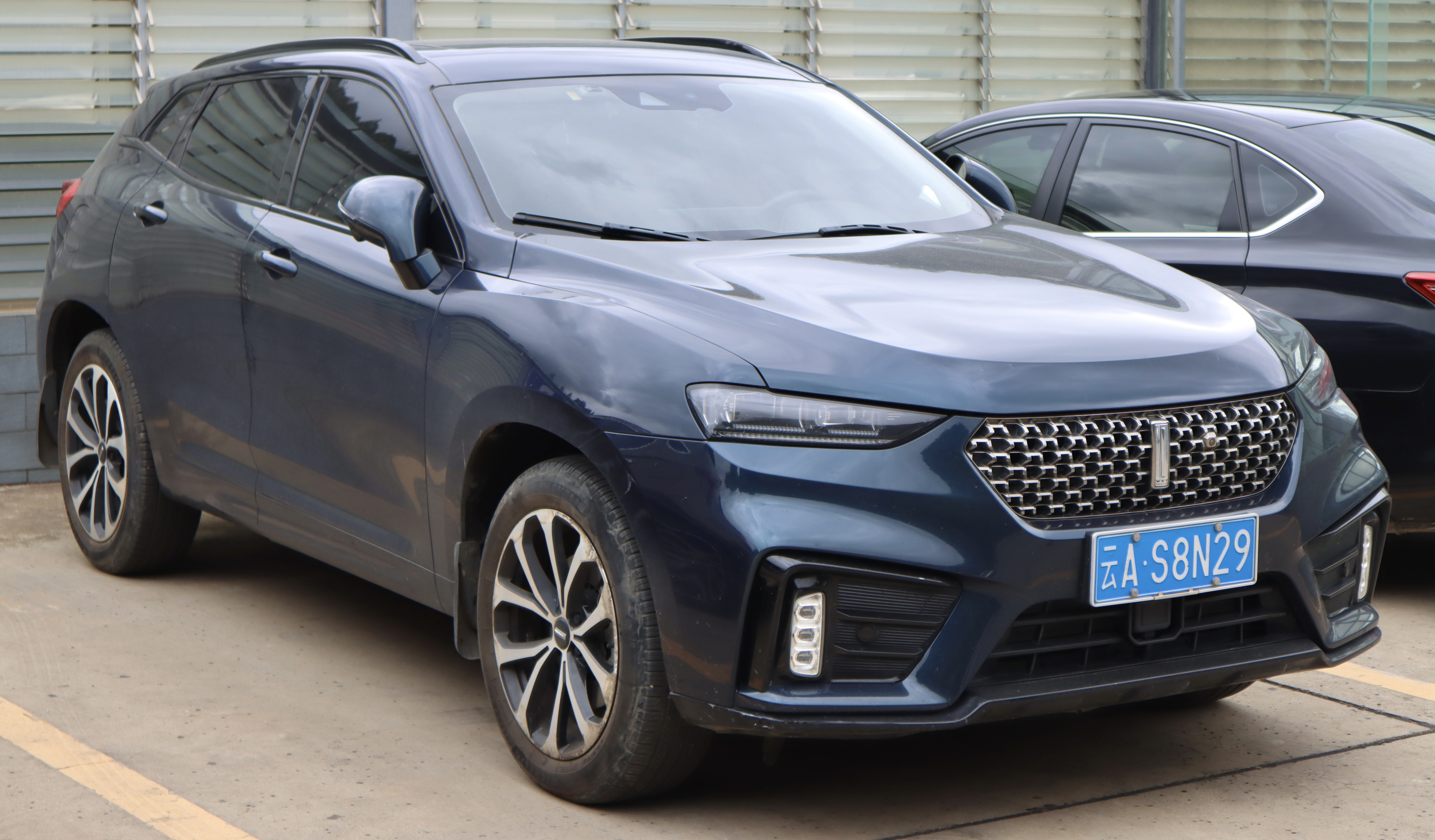
- WEY VV7

Overview
- Manufacturer: Great Wall Motor
- Production: 2017–2021
- Model years: 2017–2021
- Assembly: Tianjin, China
- Designer: Rong Ma (exterior)

Body and chassis
- Class: Mid-size luxury crossover SUV
- Body style: 5-door SUV; 5-door coupe SUV (VV7 GT)
- Layout: Front-engine, front-wheel-drive Four-wheel-drive
- Related: WEY VV5; Haval H6

Powertrain
- Engine: 2.0 L GW4E20CB I4 (turbo petrol); 2.0 L GW4C20A I4 (turbo petrol plug-in hybrid)
- Electric motor: 85 kW (114 bhp) Electric Motor
- Transmission: 6-speed DCT (PHEV); 7-speed DCT
- Range: 373 mi (600 kilometres)
- Electric range: 31 mi (50 kilometres)

Dimensions
- Wheelbase: 2,950 mm (116.1 in)
- Length: 4,749 mm (187.0 in)
- Width: 1,931 mm (76.0 in)
- Height: 1,655 mm (65.2 in)

Chronology
- Successor: WEY Mocha

The WEY VV7 is a mid-size luxury crossover SUV produced by Great Wall Motor under the premium brand, WEY. The WEY VV7 was launched on the Chinese auto market in April 2017.

== Overview ==
The VV7, formerly known as the 01 in development phase, is the first product of Great Wall Motor’s brand, WEY. The VV7 was based on the same architecture that underpins the WEY VV5 and Haval H6 crossovers. The design of the VV7 was first previewed by the Haval Coupe Concept.

The VV7 comes with two trim levels: an entry-level model named VV7 C and a sportier model named the VV7 S.

The WEY VV7 is powered by a 2.0-liter turbo engine code named GW4E20CB, with a maximum output of 227hp/5500rpm and a torque of 387N·m/1800-3600rpm mated to a 7-speed dual-clutch transmission.

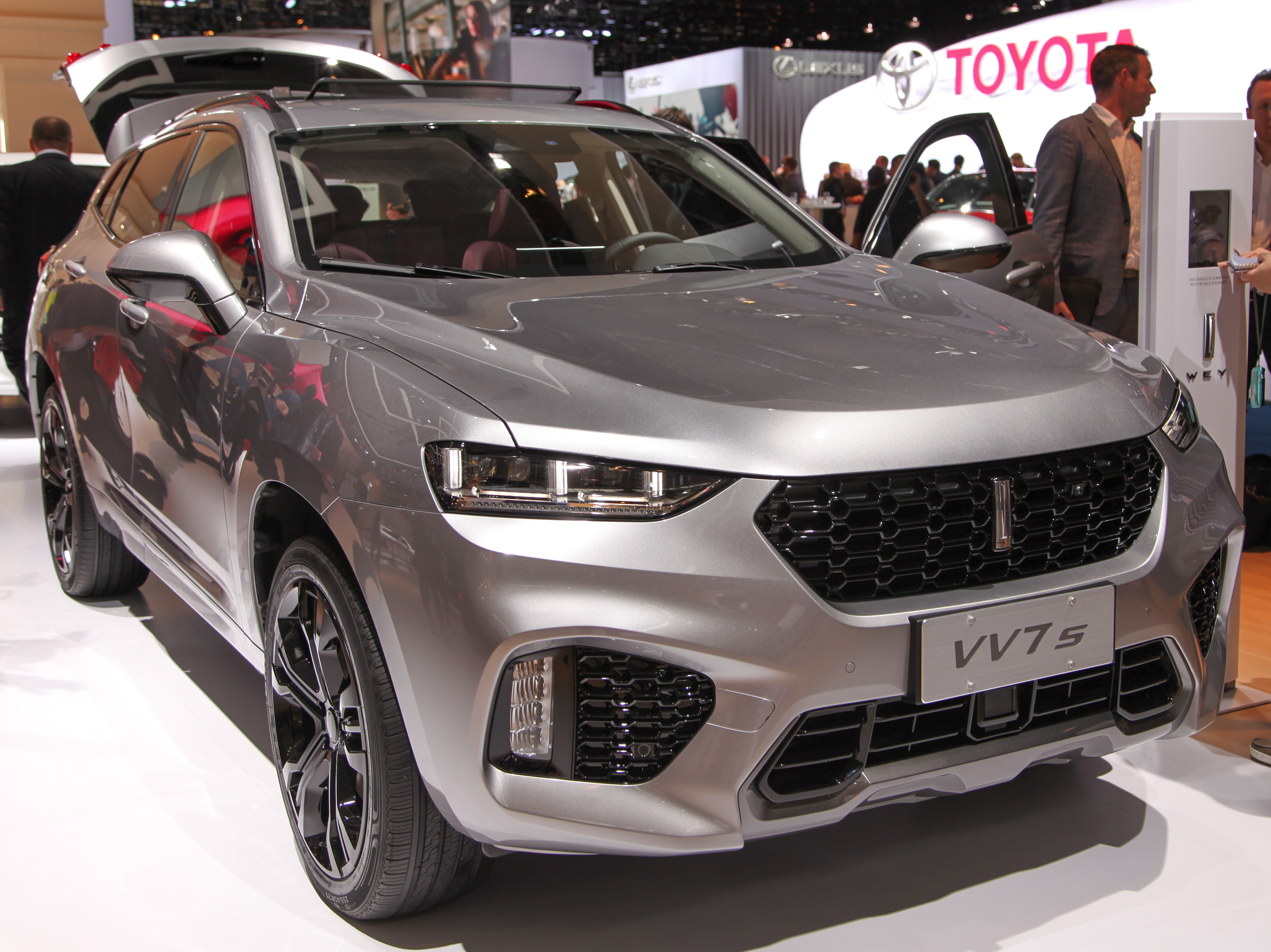
WEY VV7 S debut at IAA front view

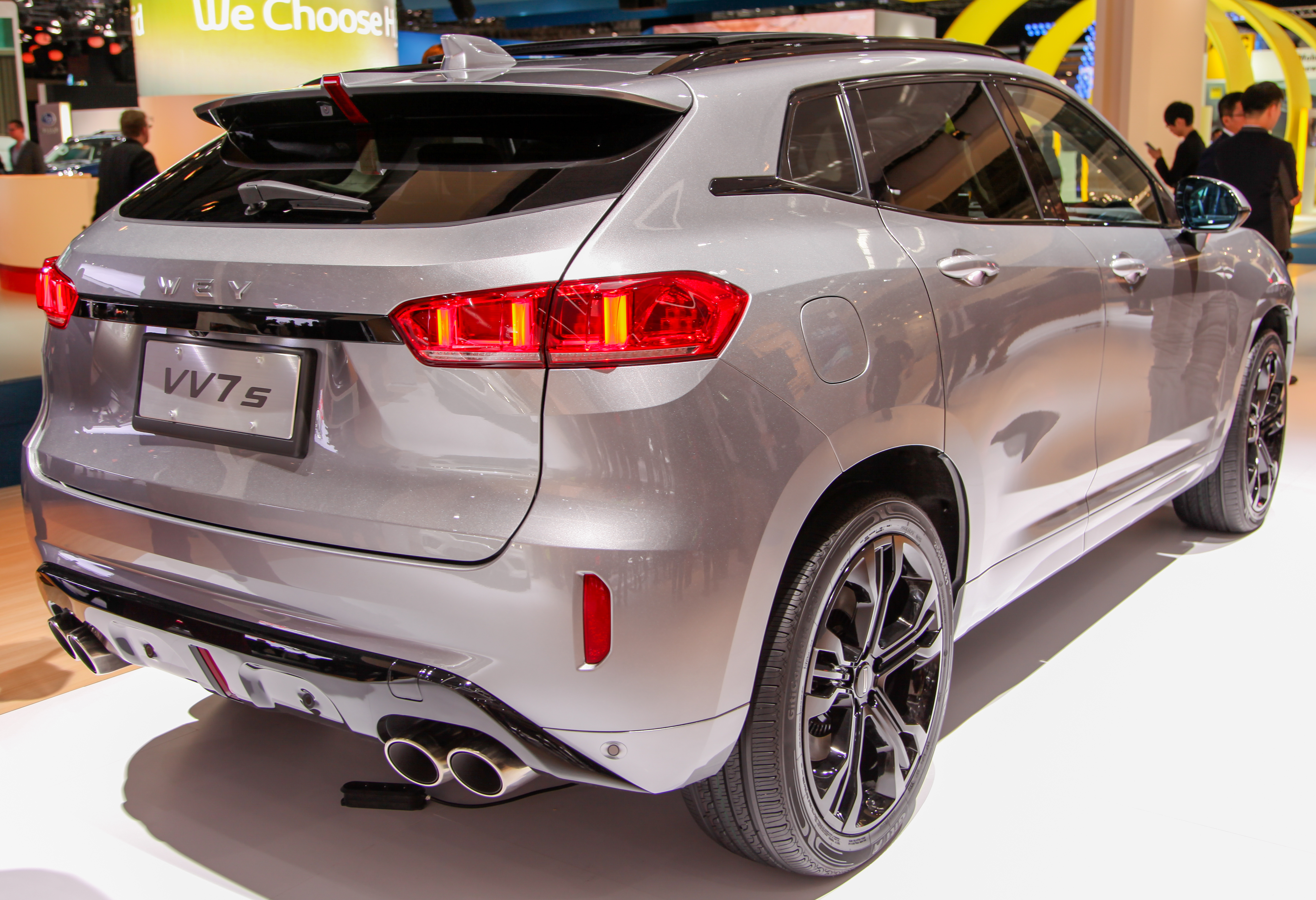
WEY VV7 S debut at IAA rear view

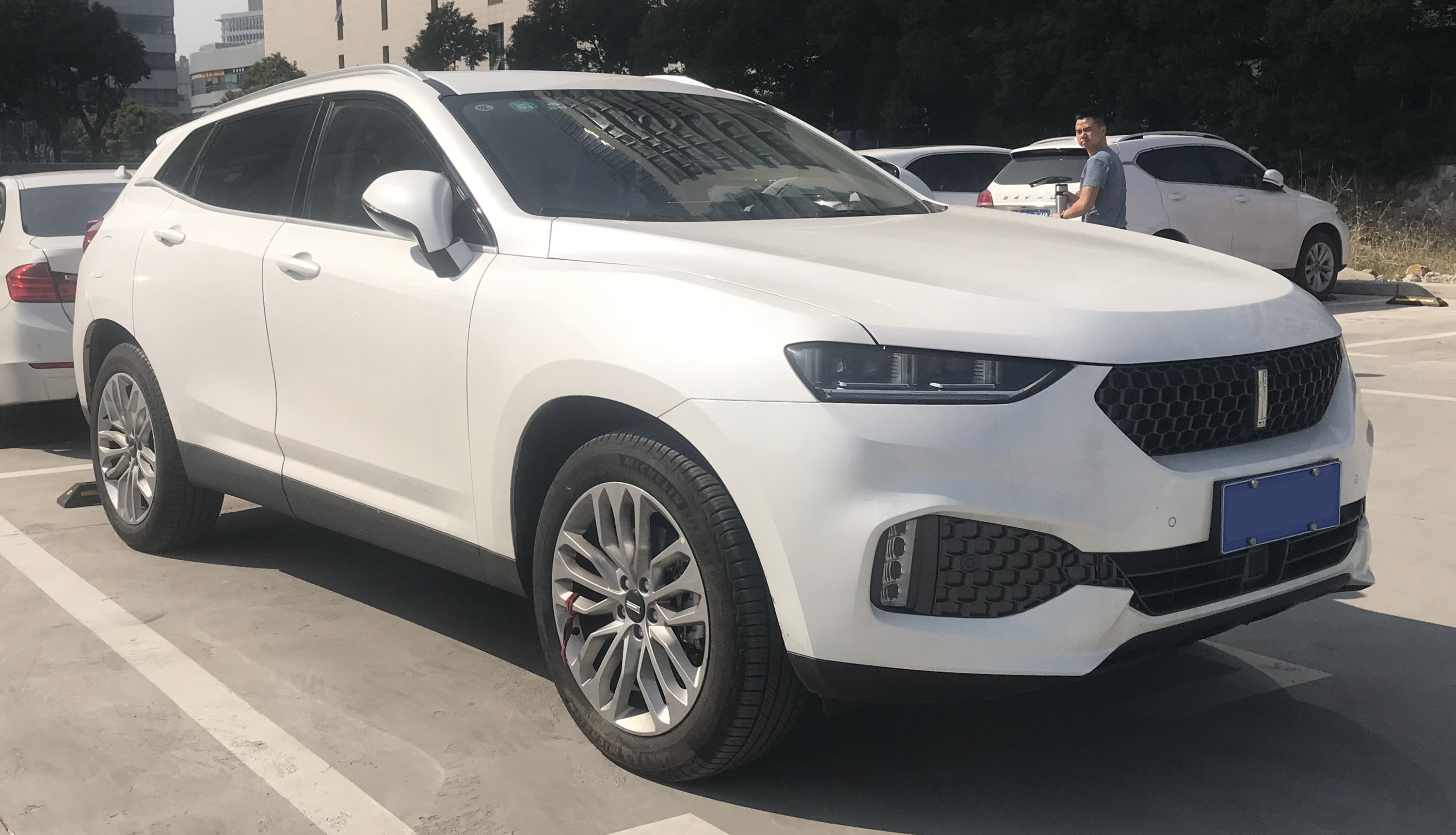
WEY VV7 C front

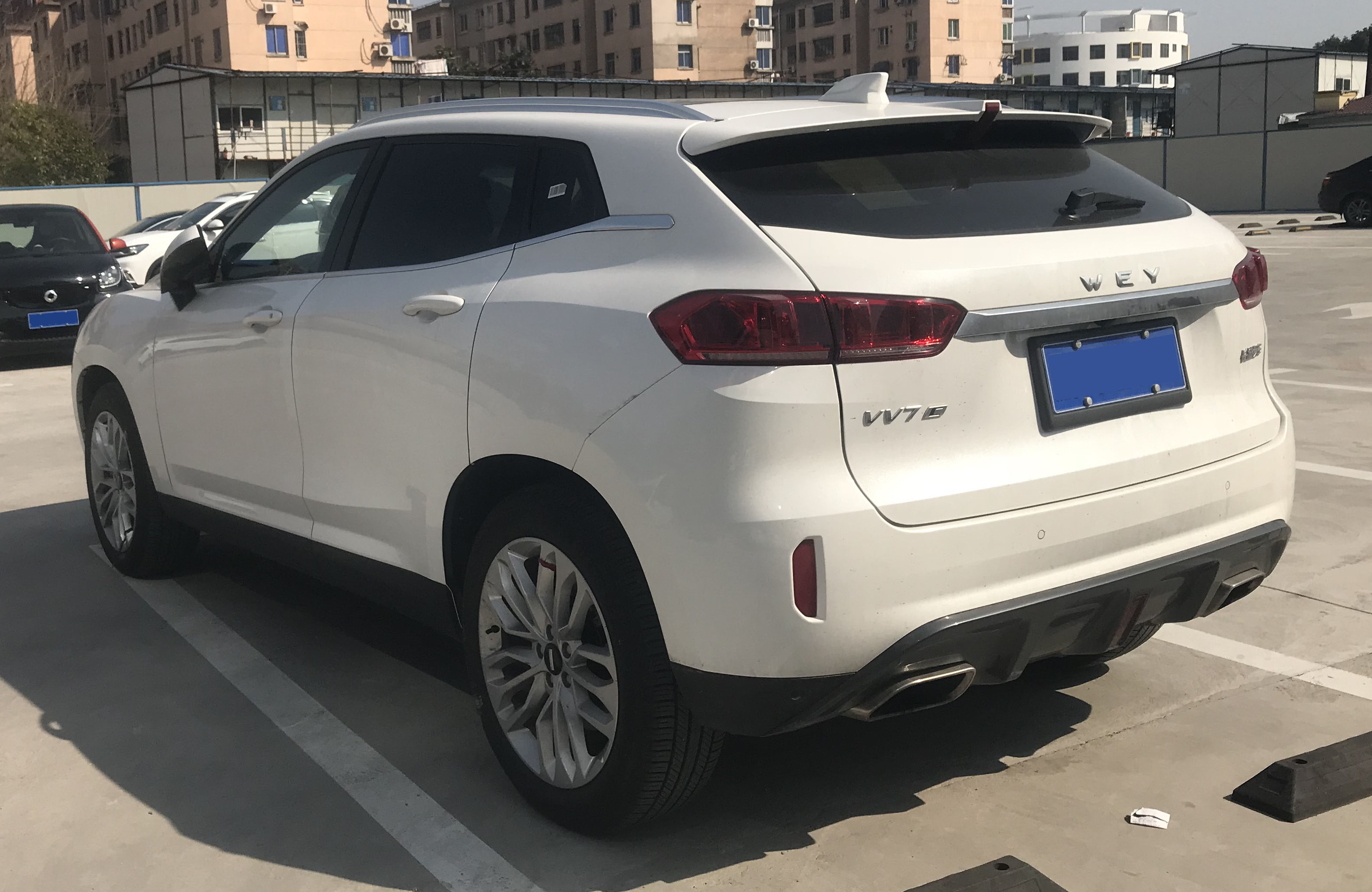
WEY VV7 C rear

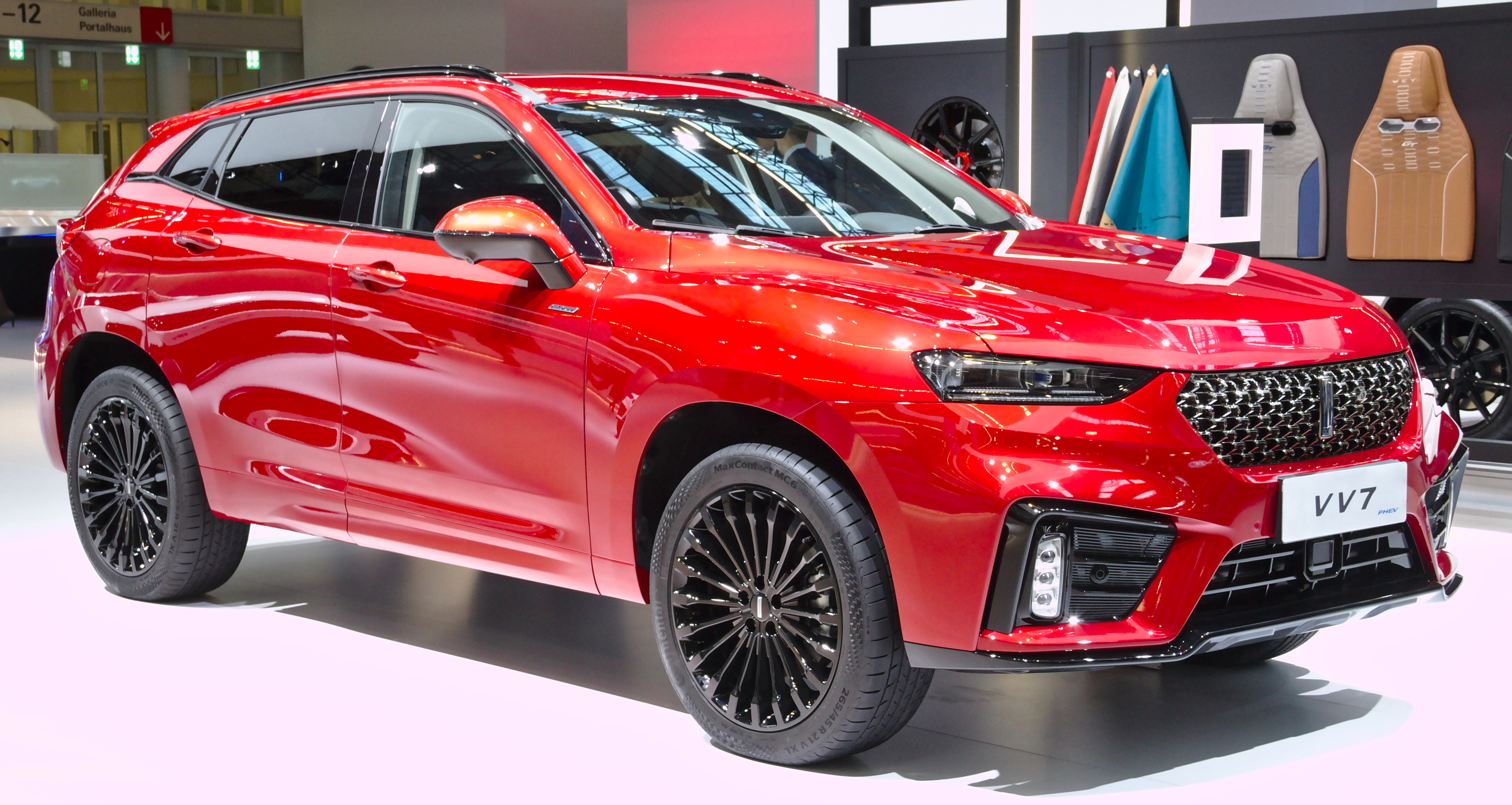
Wey VV7 PHEV

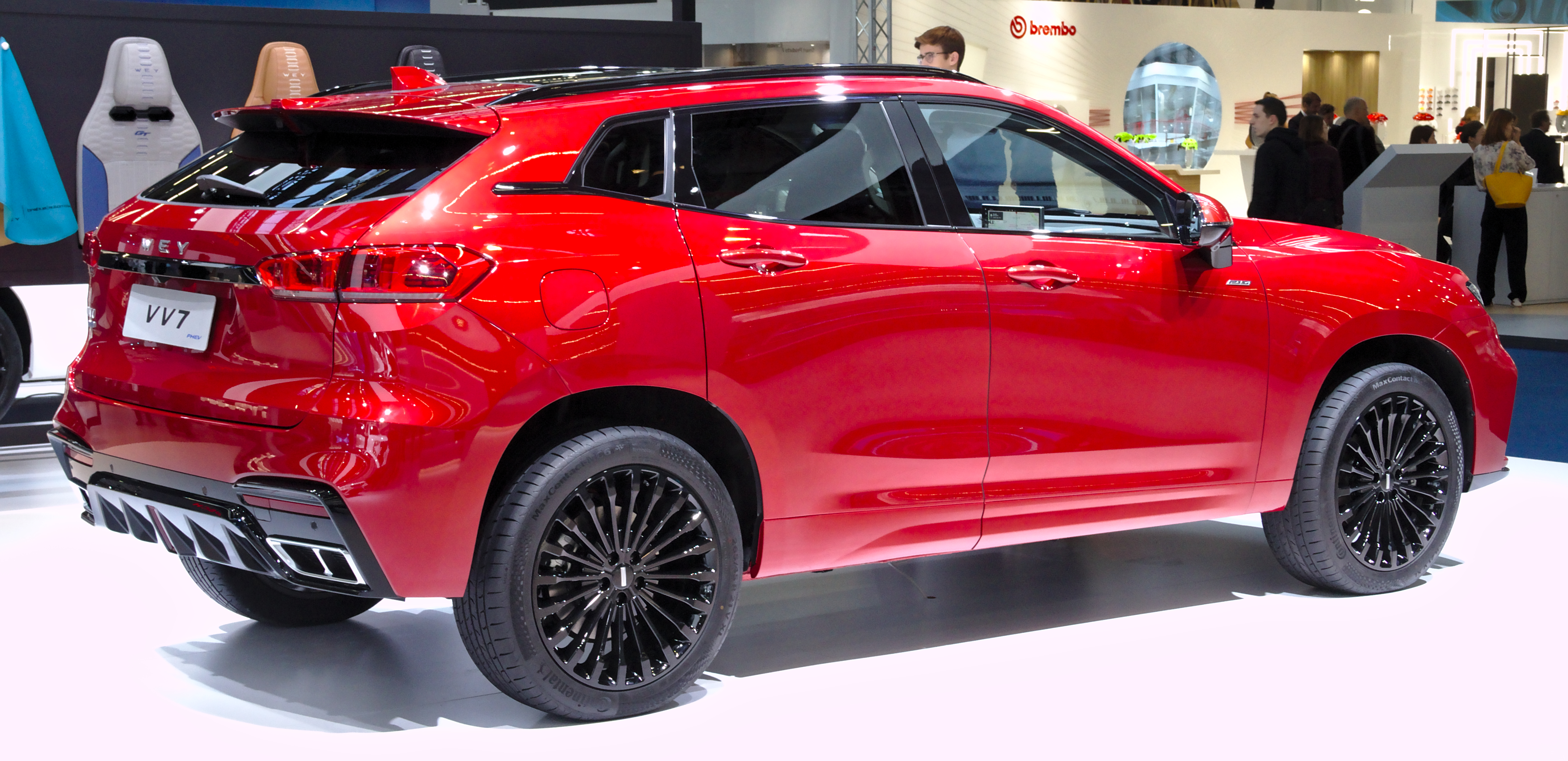
Wey VV7 PHEV rear

== WEY VV7 GT ==
The WEY VV7 GT is the fastback version of the WEY VV7, and shares all the components before the C-pillars. Different from the regular VV7, the VV7 GT also features a launch control system only available on the VV7 GT.

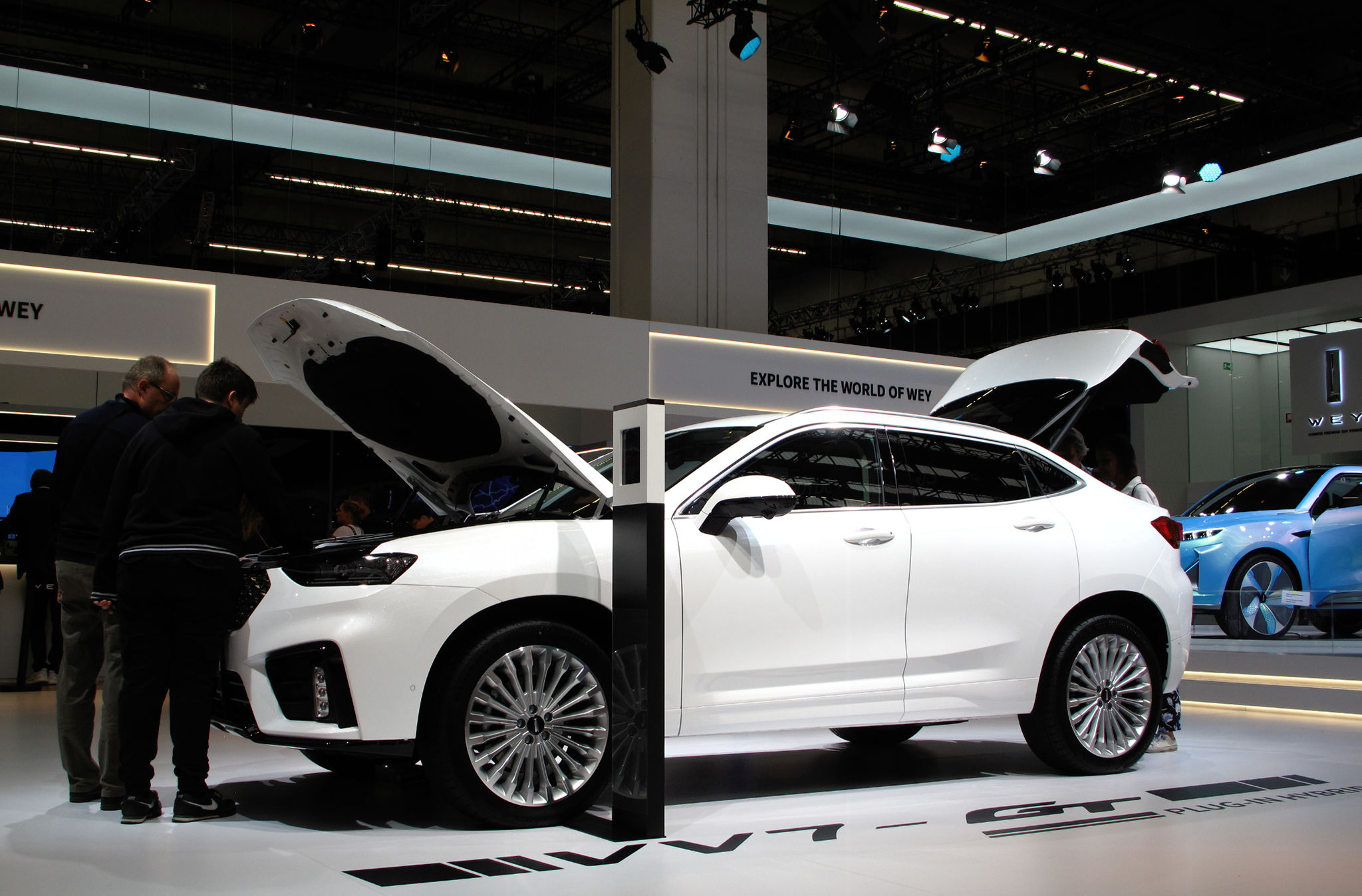
Wey VV7 GT PHEV front

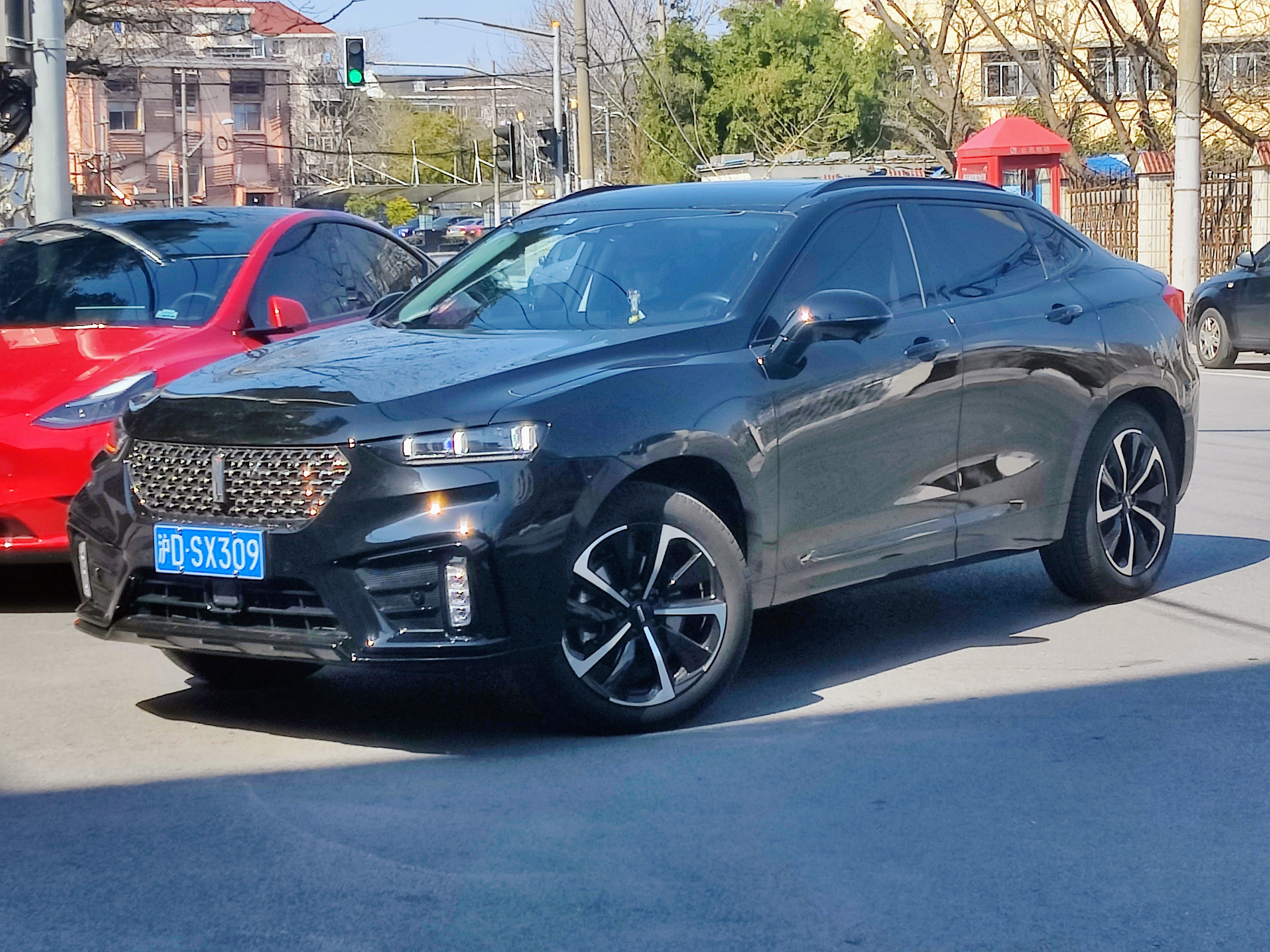
Wey VV7 GT front

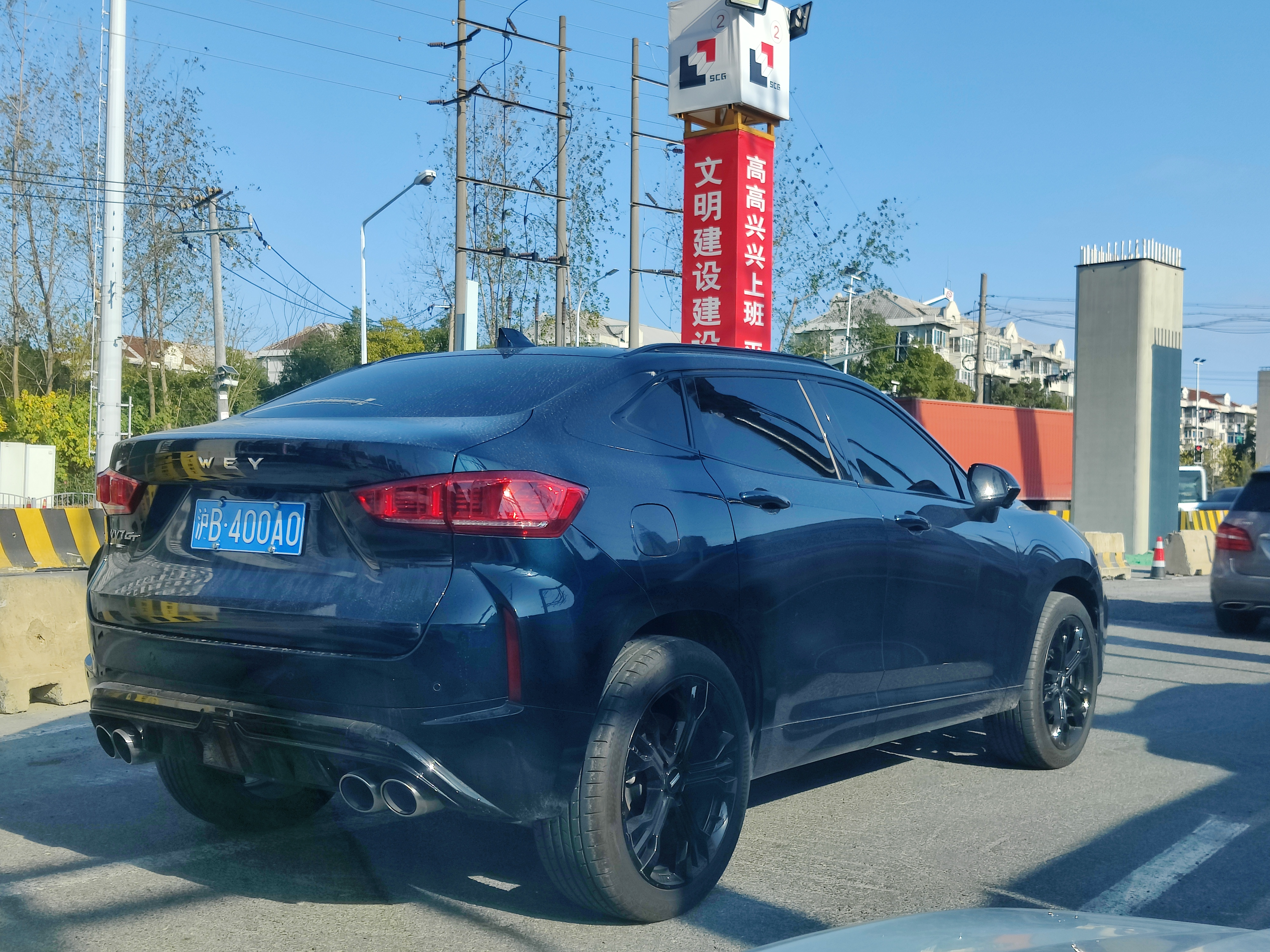
Wey VV7 GT rear

== WEY VV7 GT Brabus ==
Brabus designed and tuned version of the WEY VV7 GT. This variant includes flared fenders, black 21-inch wheels, red brake calipers, modified front and rear bumpers, a black rear diffuser, an F1-style rear brake light, tinted windows, clear taillights and an enlarged rear deck lid spoiler.

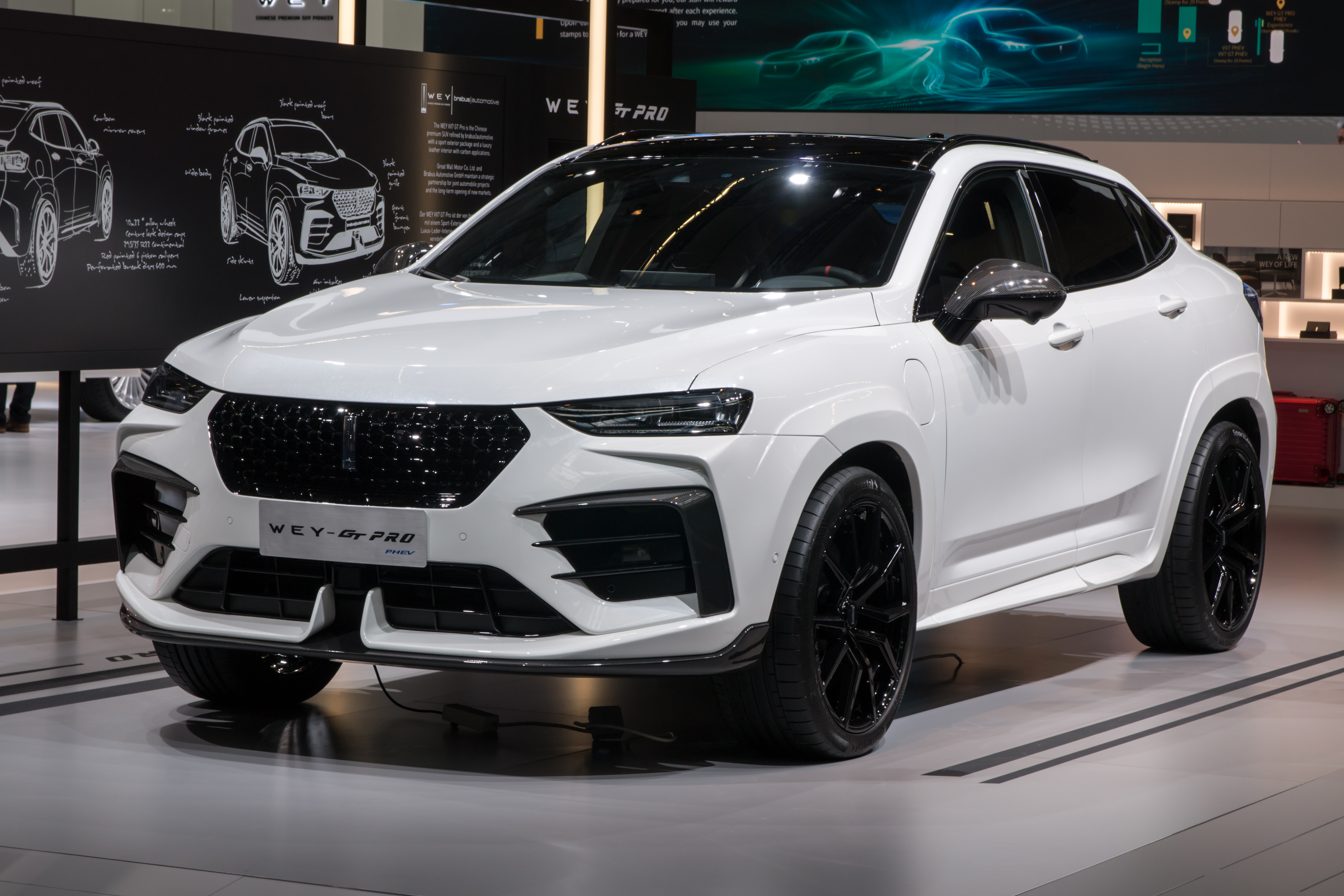
WEY VV7 GT Brabus front

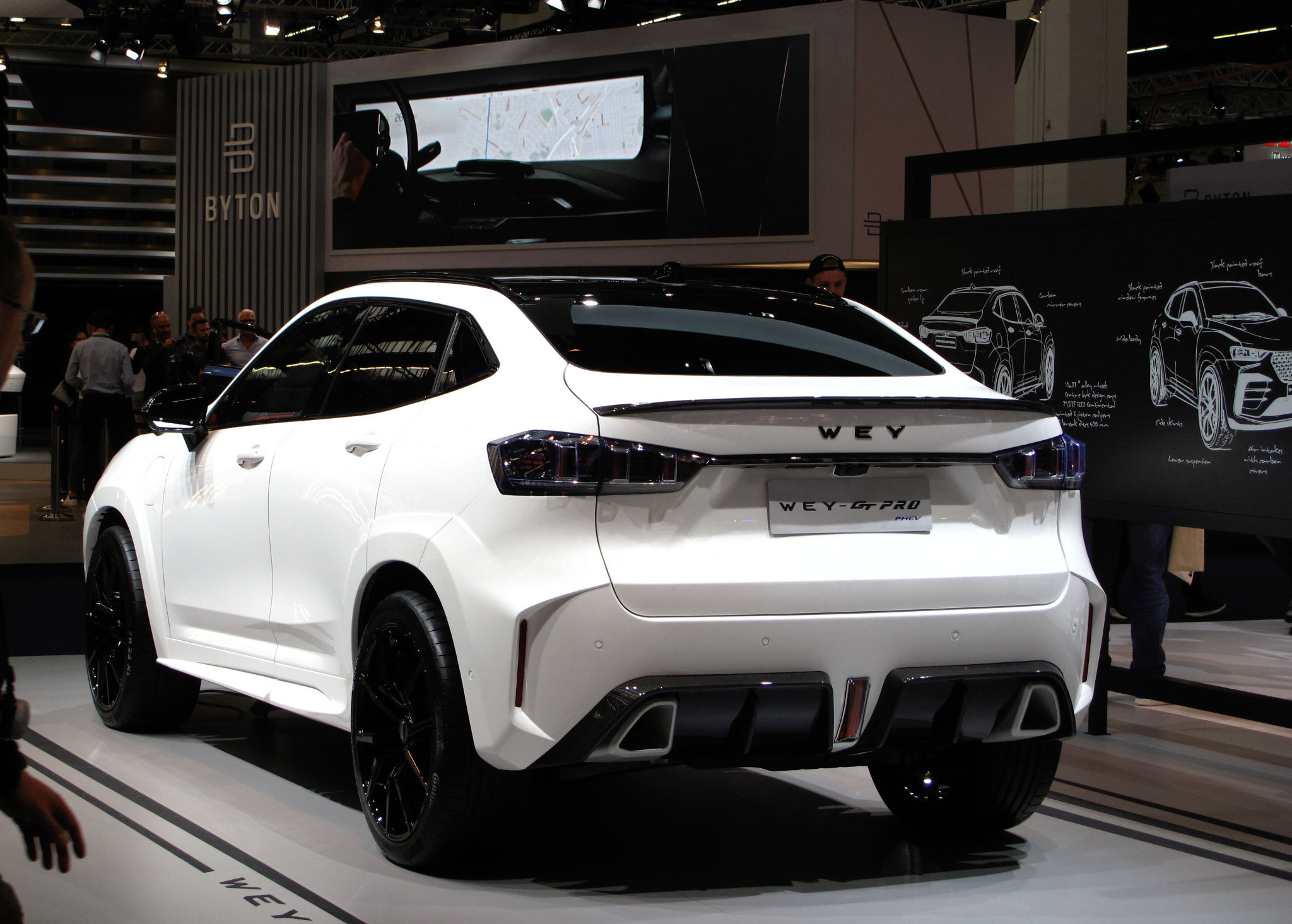
WEY VV7 GT Brabus rear
