= Wey VV5 =

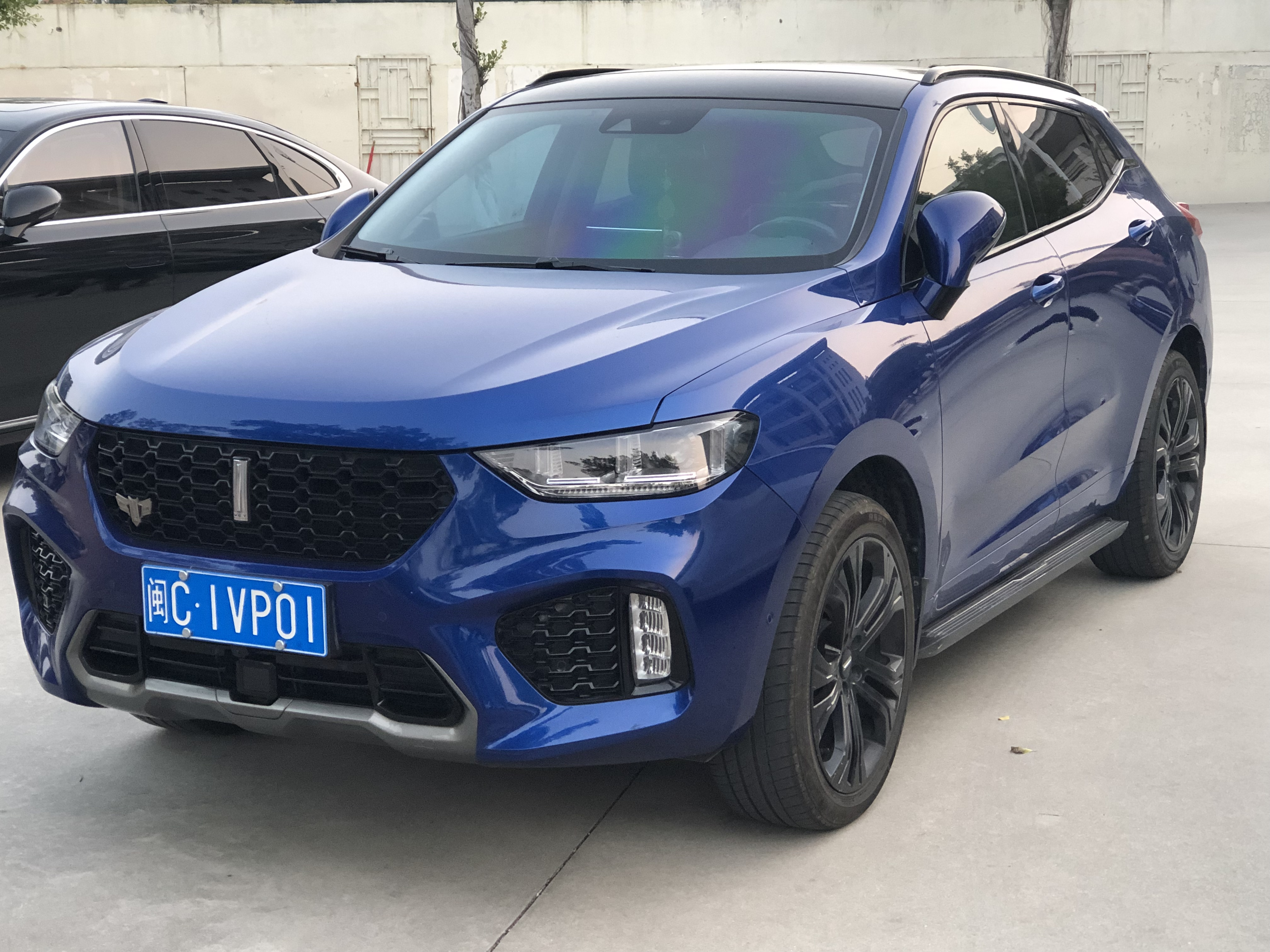

Overview
- Manufacturer: Great Wall Motor
- Production: 2017–2021
- Model years: 2017–2021
- Assembly: China: Tianjin
- Designer: Rong Ma (exterior)

Body and chassis
- Class: Crossover SUV
- Body style: 5-door SUV
- Layout: Front-engine, front-wheel-drive
- Related: Wey VV7; Haval H6

Powertrain
- Engine: 1.5 L GW4B15NT I4 (turbo gasoline); 2.0 L GW4C20NT I4 turbo (gasoline)
- Transmission: 7-speed DCT

Dimensions
- Wheelbase: 2,680 mm (105.5 in)
- Length: 4,462 mm (175.7 in)
- Width: 1,857 mm (73.1 in)
- Height: 1,638 mm (64.5 in)

Chronology
- Successor: Wey Latte; Wey Macchiato

The Wey VV5 is a crossover SUV manufactured by Great Wall Motor under the Wey brand.

== Overview ==
The VV5, formerly known as the 02 during development phase shares the same platform as the Wey VV7 and the second generation Haval H6.

The Wey VV5 is powered by a 1.5 liter inline-4 turbo engine producing 171hp or a 2.0 liter inline-4 turbo engine producing 227hp, with both engine options mated to a 7-speed dual-clutch transmission.

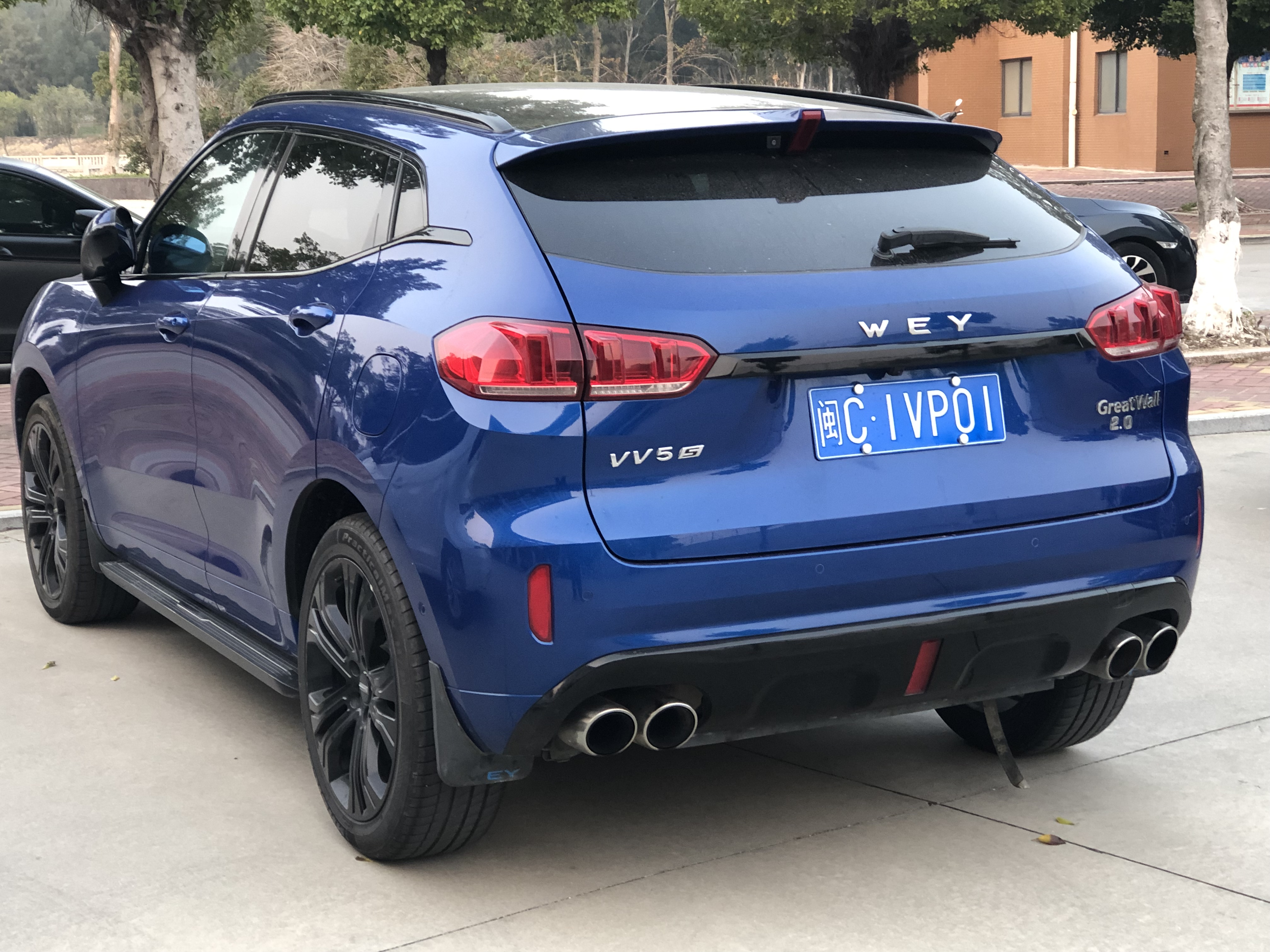
Rear view

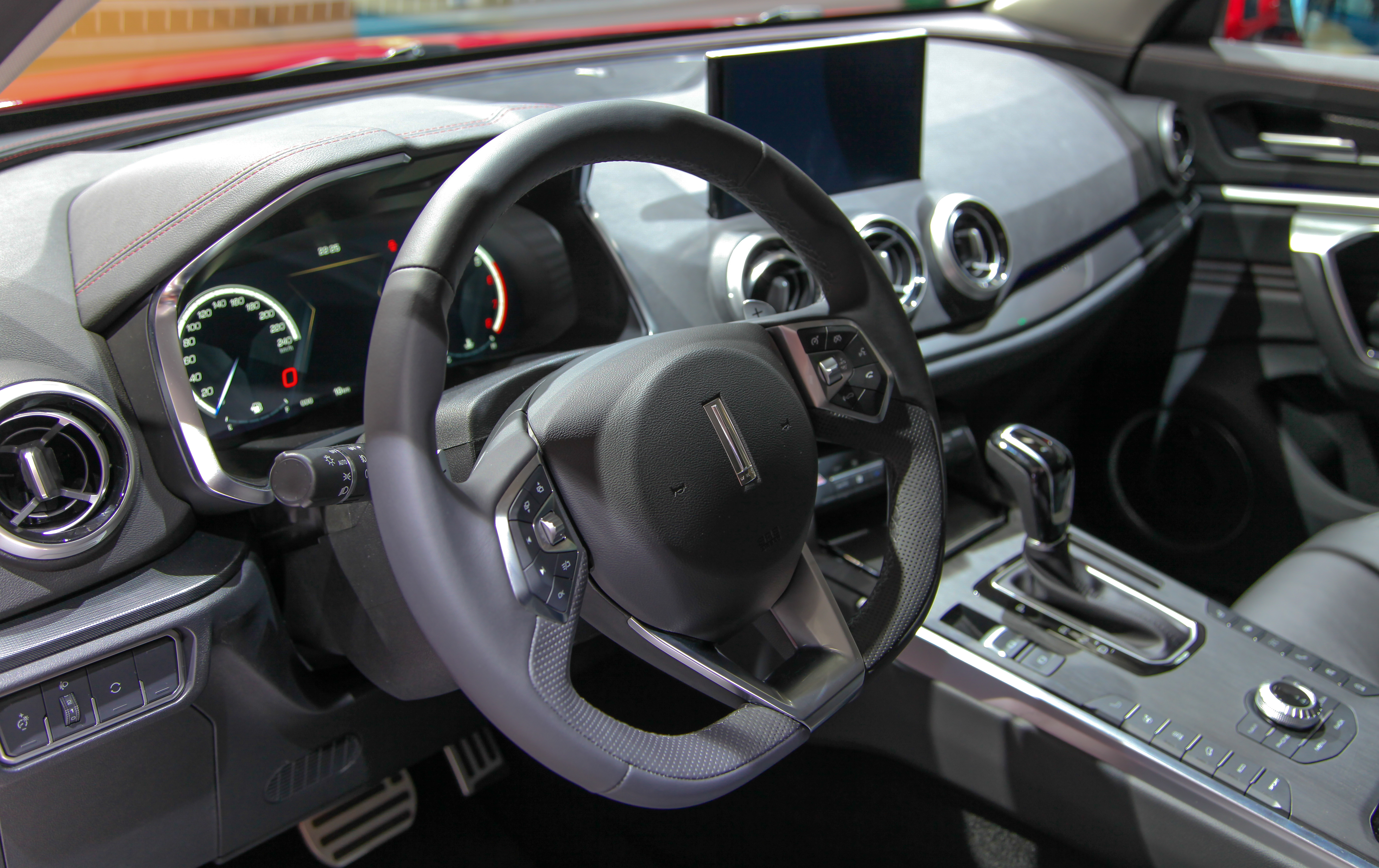
Interior
