= Great Wall Deer =

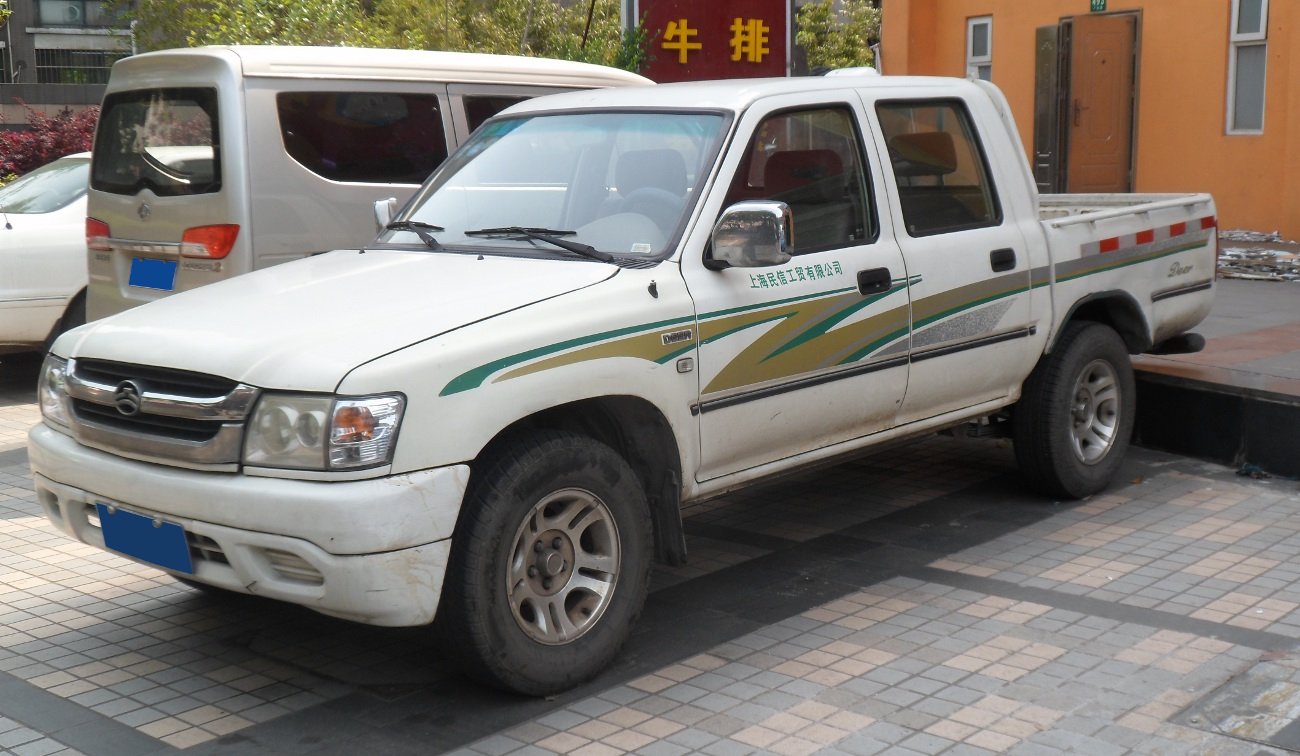

Overview
- Manufacturer: Great Wall Motors
- Production: 1996–2013
- Assembly: Baoding, Hebei, China; Golpayegan, Iran (Diar)

Body and chassis
- Class: Compact pickup truck
- Related: Great Wall Safe

Powertrain
- Engine: 2.2 L GW491QE I4 (petrol); 2.8 L GW2.8TC I4 (diesel); 2.8 L GW2.8TDI-2 I4 (diesel)
- Transmission: 5 speed manual

Dimensions
- Wheelbase: Single cab: 2,960 mm (116.5 in); One and a half cab: 3,085 mm (121.5 in); Standard-wheelbase double cab: 2,850 mm (112.2 in); Long wheelbase double cab: 3,380 mm (133.1 in)
- Length: Single cab: 4,945–5,053 mm (194.7–198.9 in); One and a half cab: 5,030–5,130 mm (198.0–202.0 in); Standard-wheelbase double cab: 4,790–4,890 mm (188.6–192.5 in); Long wheelbase double cab: 5,280–5,380 mm (207.9–211.8 in); 5,305–5,405 mm (208.9–212.8 in)
- Width: 1,705 mm (67.1 in)
- Height: Single cab: 1,695 mm (66.7 in); One and a half cab: 1,665 mm (65.6 in); Standard-wheelbase double cab: 1,715 mm (67.5 in); Long wheelbase double cab: 1,685 mm (66.3 in)
- Curb weight: Single cab: 1,325 kg (2,921.1 lb); One and a half cab: 1,350 kg (2,976.2 lb); Standard-wheelbase double cab: 1,395–1,495 kg (3,075.4–3,295.9 lb); Long wheelbase double cab: 1,425–1,525 kg (3,141.6–3,362.0 lb)

Chronology
- Predecessor: Hongqi CA1021U3
- Successor: Great Wall Wingle

The Great Wall Deer (Chinese: 长城迪尔; pinyin: Chángchéng Díěr) is a compact pickup truck manufactured by the Chinese automaker Great Wall Motors from 1996 to 2013.

The Deer commenced production in March 1996 and ceased in June 2013. The Deer started being exported to the Middle East in 1996. It was exported to other regions such as Africa and Latin America. The Deer was built as a replacement for the Hongqi CA1021U3 coupe utilities.

The design heavily resembles the sixth generation Toyota Hilux.

== Body styles ==
It was available in five body styles:

- Extra long single cabin
- One and a half cabin
- Standard double cabin
- Medium double cabin
- Extra long double cabin

== Gallery ==
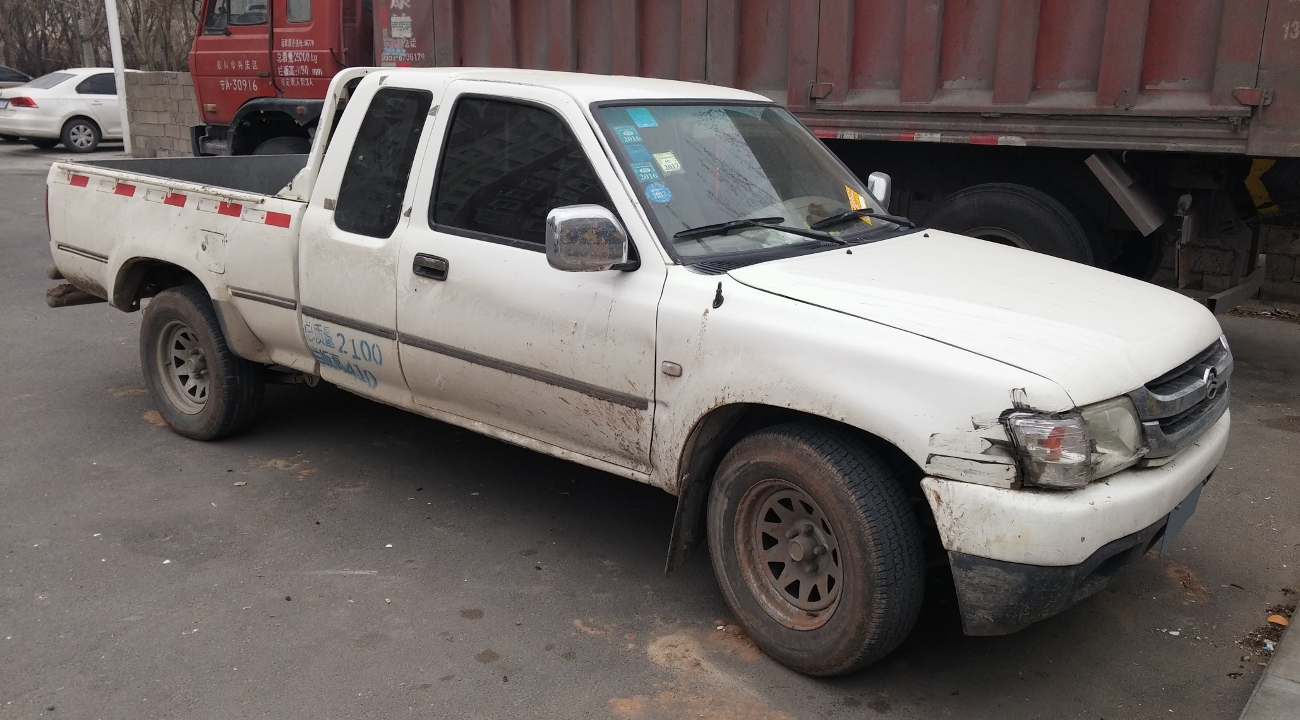
Deer, One and a half cabin

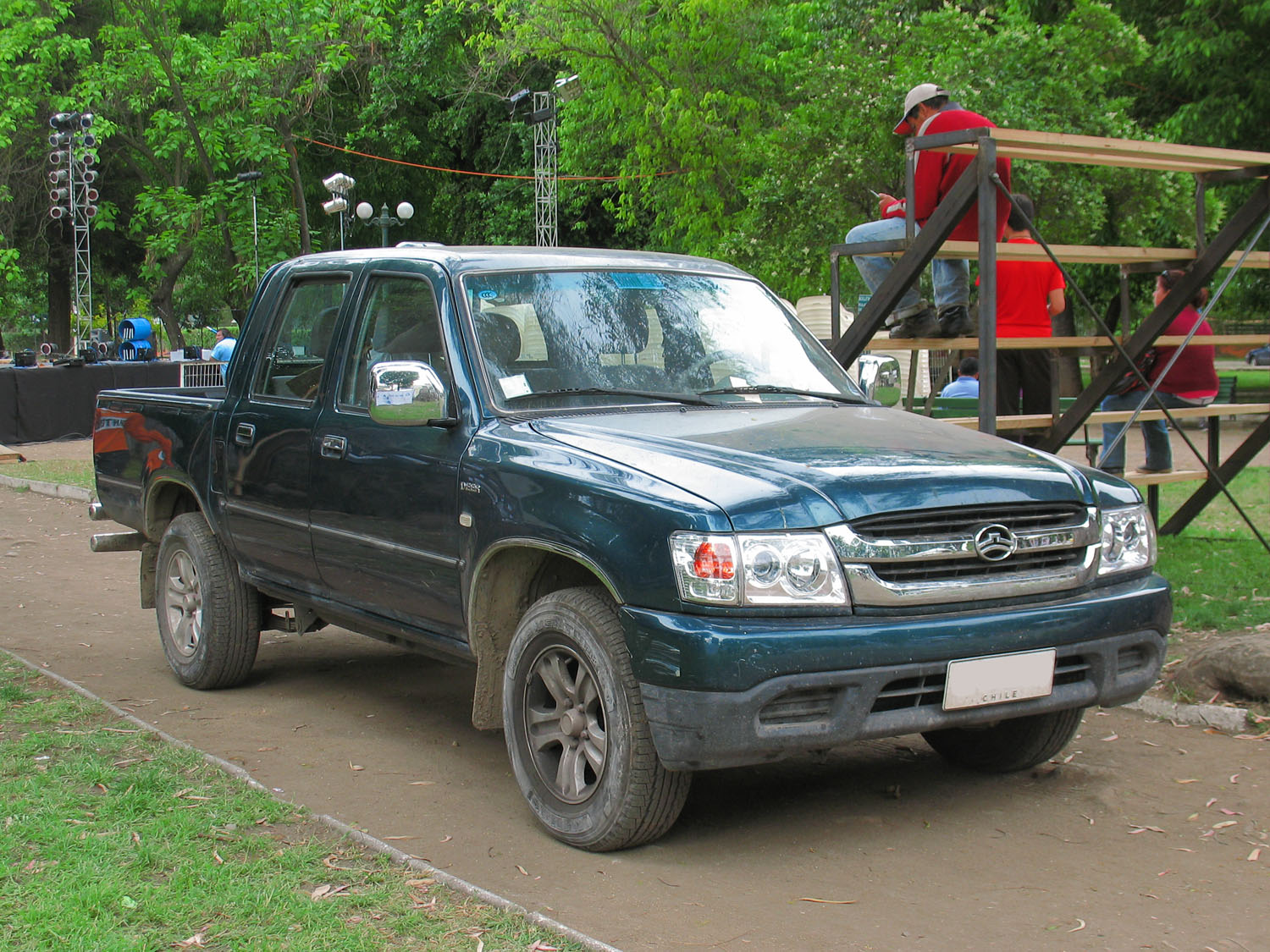
Deer, standard double cabin, 2010

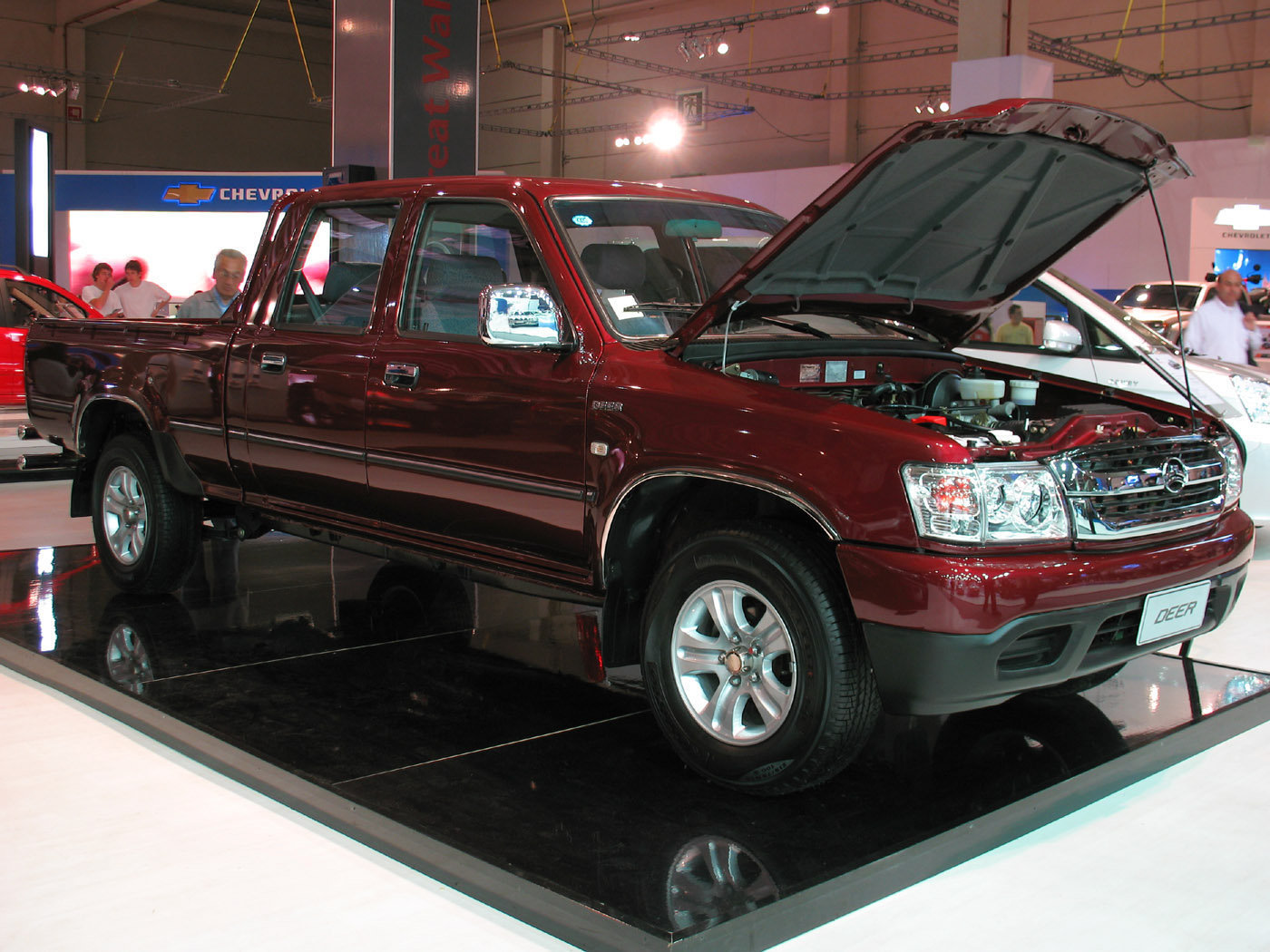
Deer, Extra long double cabin, 2008
