= Haval H5 =

Compact SUV made by Great Wall

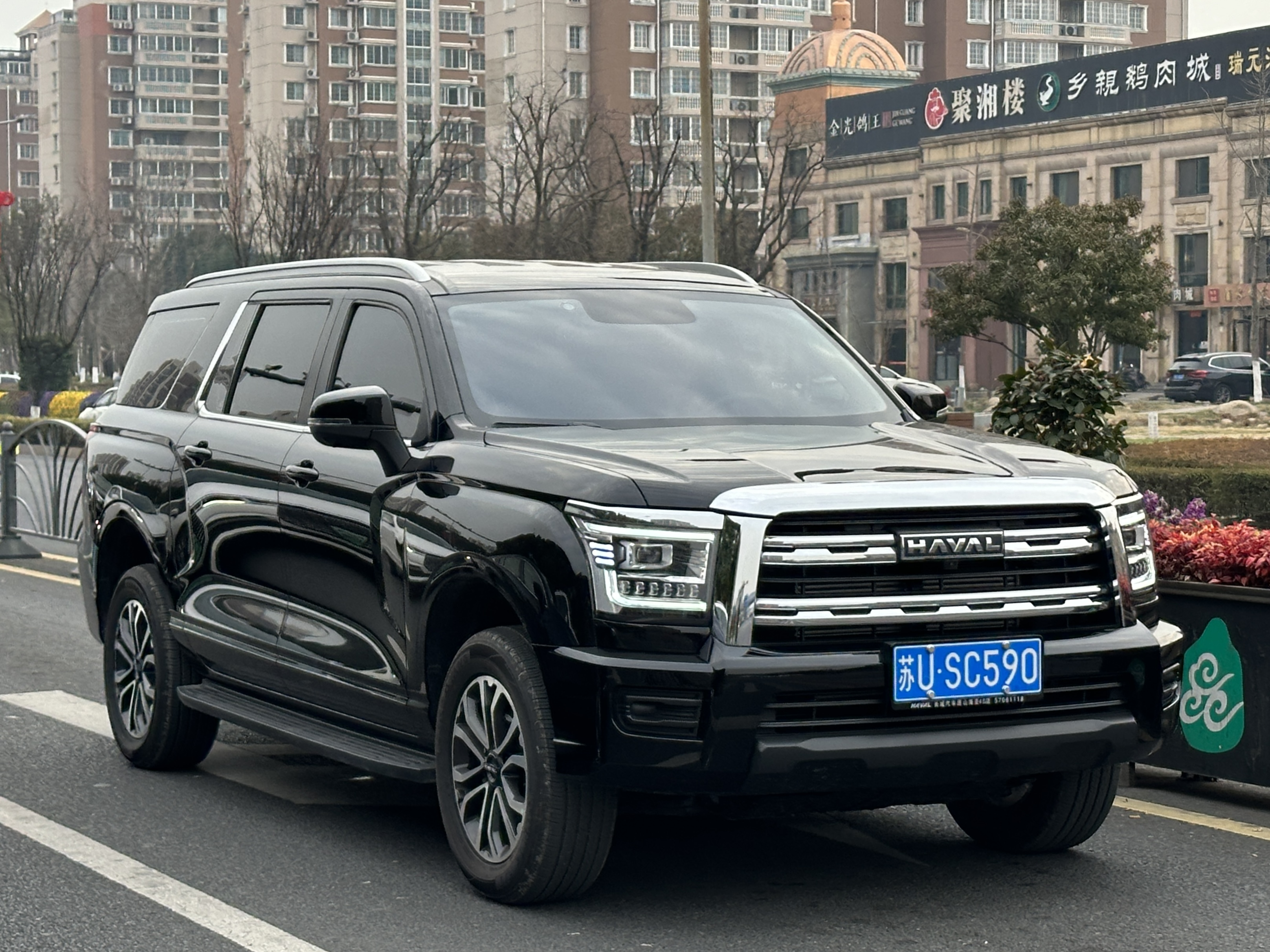
- 2023 Haval H5

Overview
- Manufacturer: Haval (GWM)
- Also called: Great Wall Haval H5; Hover H5
- Production: 2010–2020; 2023–present

Body and chassis
- Class: Compact SUV (2010–2020); Full-size SUV (2023–present)
- Body style: 5-door SUV

The Haval H5, also known as the Great Wall Haval H5 and Hover H5 for the first generation model, is a compact sport utility vehicle (SUV) from June 2010 to 2020, and full-size SUV from 2023 produced by the Chinese manufacturer Great Wall Motor. It uses body-on-frame construction, with rear-wheel-drive and selectable four-wheel-drive, and is available with either gasoline or diesel engines.

== First generation (2010–2020) ==
Haval H5
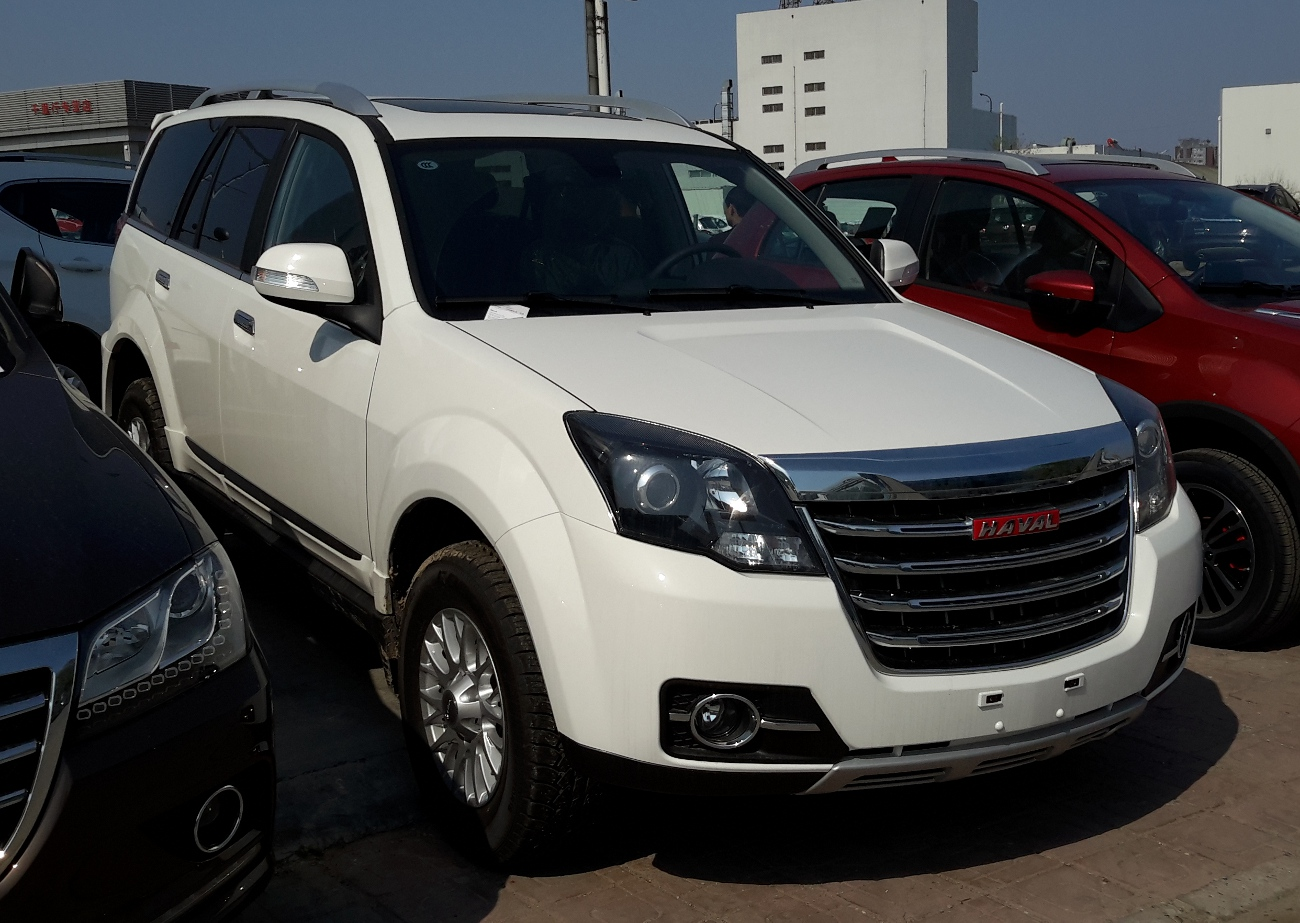

Overview
- Manufacturer: Great Wall Motor
- Also called: Great Wall Hover H5; Great Wall H5; Great Wall X200 (Australia); Great Wall X240 (Australia); Pyeonghwa Ppeokkugi 2015/2021/2406 (North Korea)
- Model years: 2010–2020
- Assembly: China: Baoding (Great Wall Motor Company Limited (GWM)); Russia: Uzlovaya

Body and chassis
- Class: Compact SUV (J)
- Body style: 5-door wagon
- Layout: Front-engine, rear-wheel drive Front-engine, four-wheel drive

Powertrain
- Engine: 2.0 L 4G63 I4 (turbo petrol); 2.4 L 4G69S4N I4 (petrol); 2.0 L GW4D20 I4 (diesel); 2.5 L GW2.5TCI I4 (diesel)
- Transmission: 6-speed manual 5-speed manual 5-speed automatic

Dimensions
- Wheelbase: 2,700 mm (106.3 in)
- Length: 4,649 mm (183.0 in)
- Width: 1,810 mm (71.3 in)
- Height: 1,745 mm (68.7 in)
- Curb weight: 1,725–1,925 kg (3,803.0–4,243.9 lb)

Chronology
- Predecessor: Great Wall Haval H3
- Successor: Haval Big Dog (CUV); Haval H9 (SUV)

=== Markets ===
==== Australia ====
In Australia, it was marketed as the X-Series, with model names relating to engine size, thus as the X240 and the X200. The vehicle has passed the European tests regarding environment protection, safety and performance and is entitled for marketing throughout the European Union. It is the successor of the Great Wall Haval H3 and both cars are nearly identical, except for their front designs.

=== Features ===
It uses Mitsubishi 4G63 and Mitsubishi 4G69S4N petrol engines of 2.0 and 2.4 litres, or the 80 kW (109 PS) GW2.5TCI diesel. In October 2010, the more powerful 110 kW (150 PS) but smaller (2.0 litres) GW4D20 diesel was added to the lineup. The Haval H5 comes with either a five-speed or a six-speed manual transmission, depending on model. It uses disk brakes. It has three trims: Standard, Luxury and Premium. The Premium trim features power windows, power door locks, rear window defrosters, leather seats, power-adjustable driver's seat, six speakers, a DVD player, GPS and a power sunroof all as standard. Heated seats are optional. Styling of the body and rear end of the Haval H5 is extremely similar to the exterior design of the Isuzu Axiom, with the front end design taking inspiration from the Mazda CX-7.

Starting from 2011, the variant sold in Australia is no longer the H3, but the facelifted H5, although the 2.4 litre gasoline model is sold as the X240 and is only available in manual transmission, and the 2.0 litre diesel models are available in either automatic or manual transmission and are sold as the X200.

Four wheel drive: The X200 automatic version (2013) does not feature a low and high range while in 4WD mode. The manual version does.

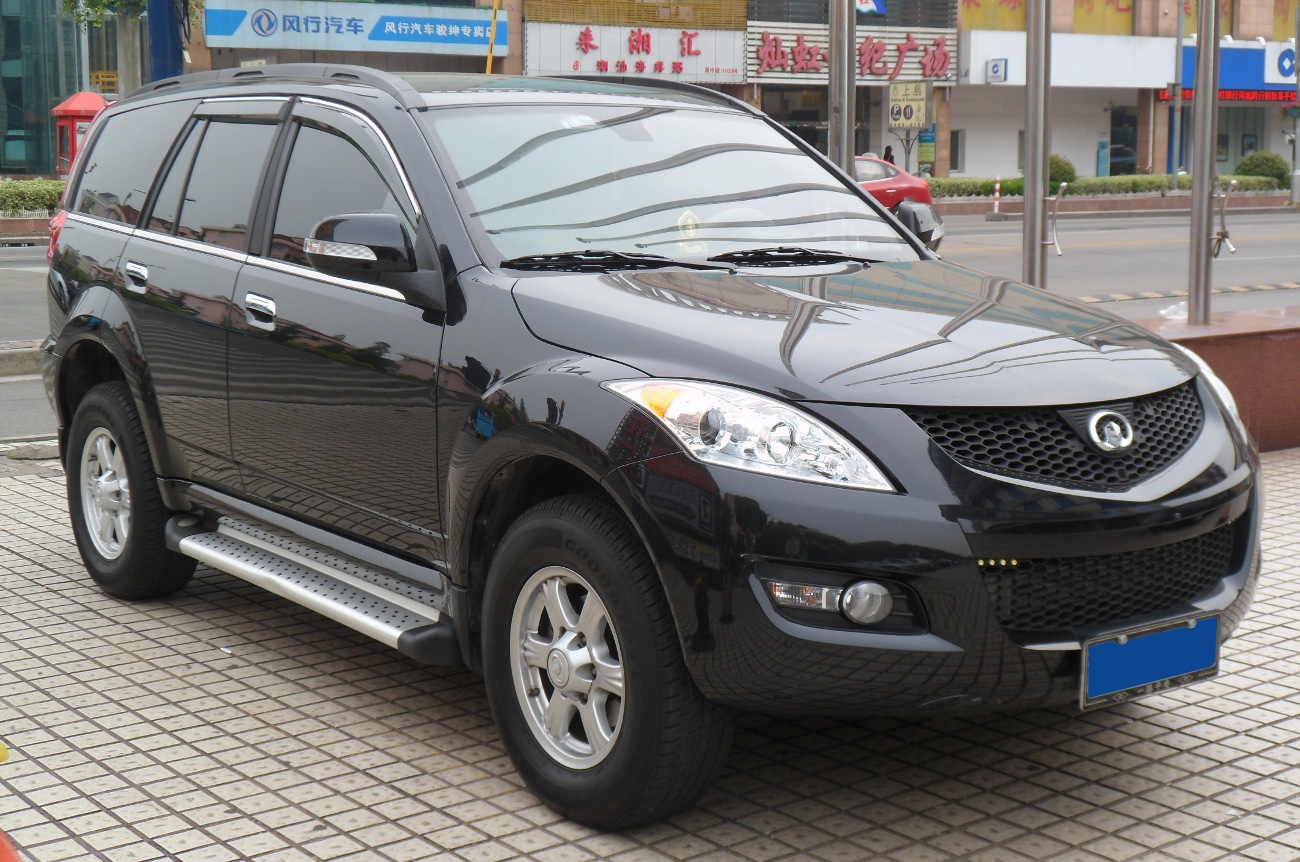
A pre-facelift Haval H5 front.

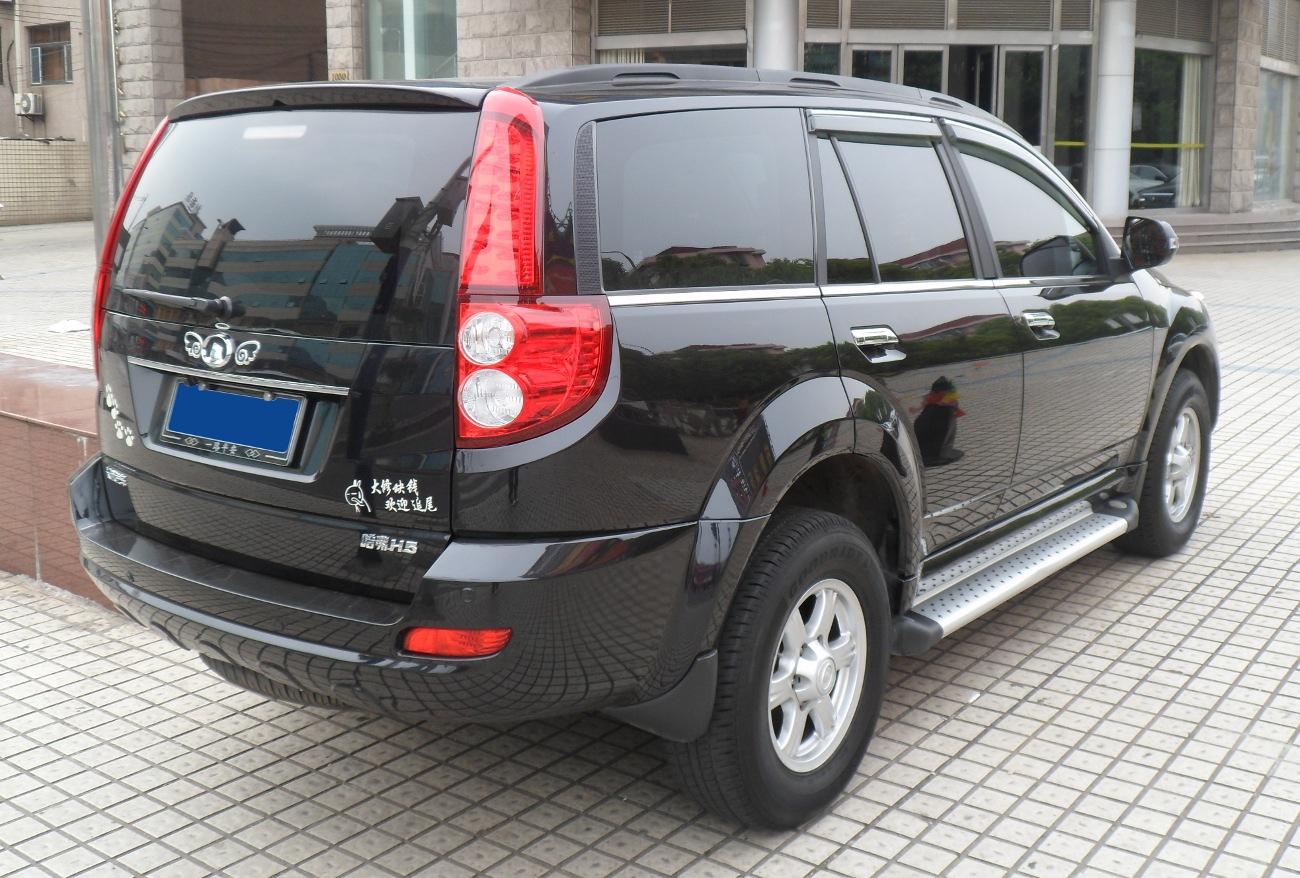
A pre-facelift Haval H5 rear.

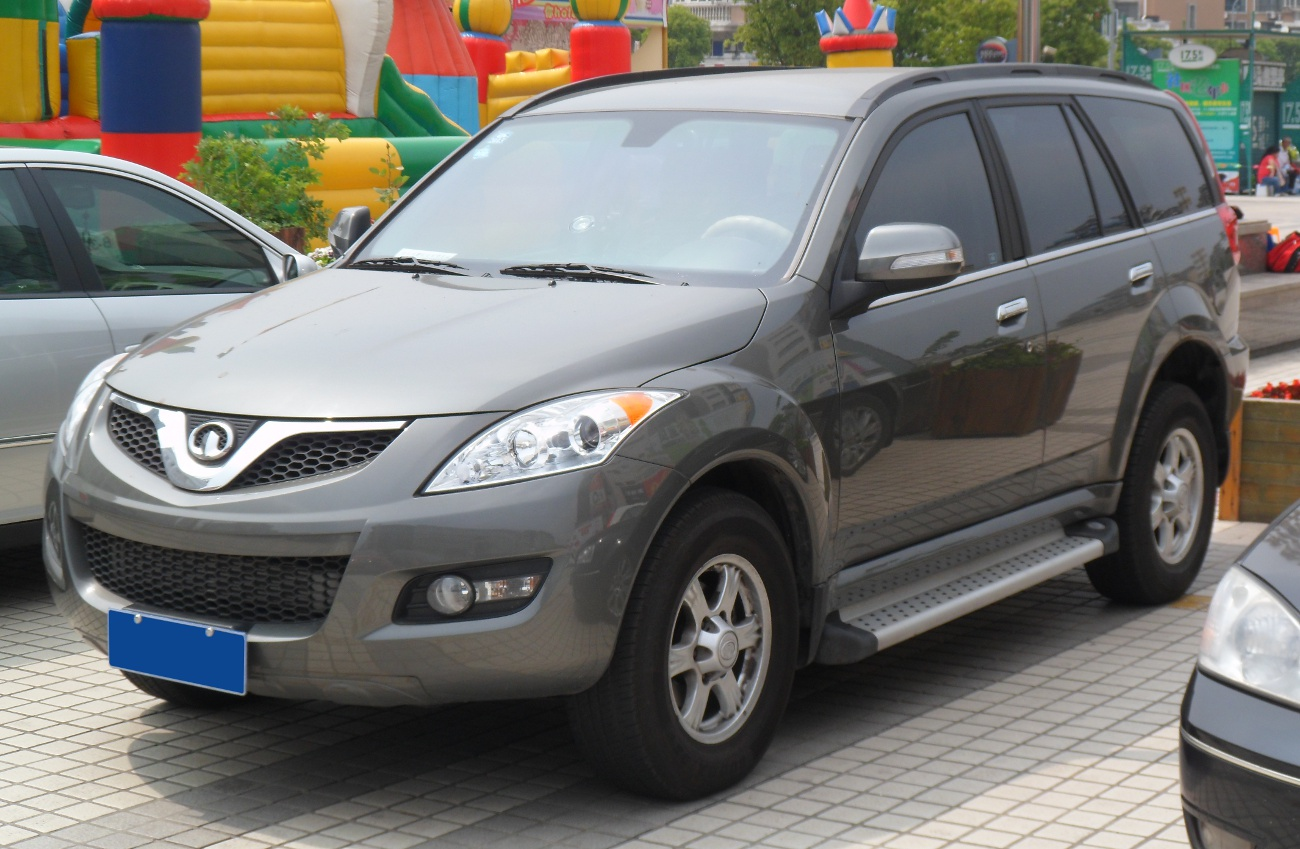
Early facelift of the Haval H5 front.

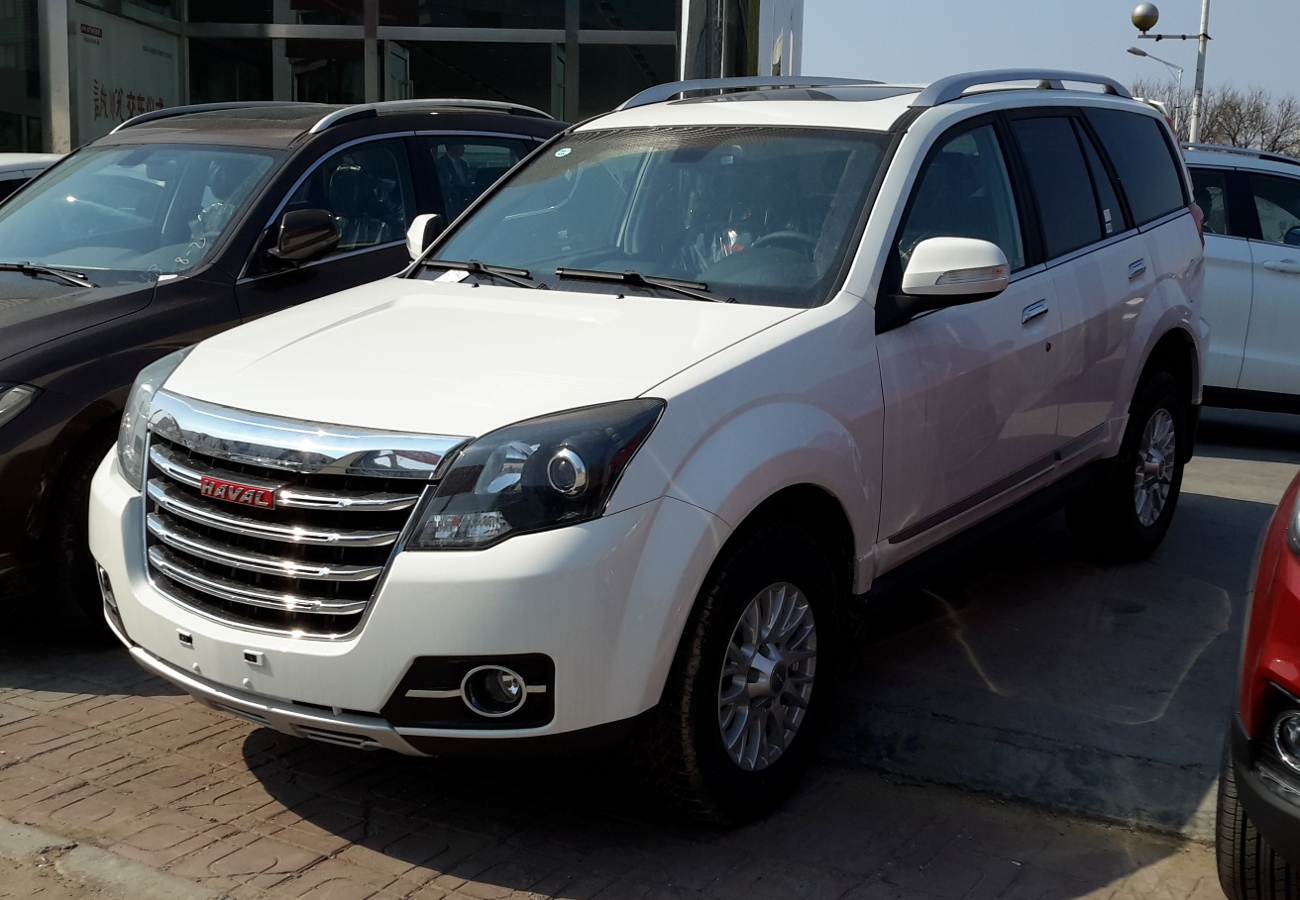
A post-facelift Haval H5 Red Label front.

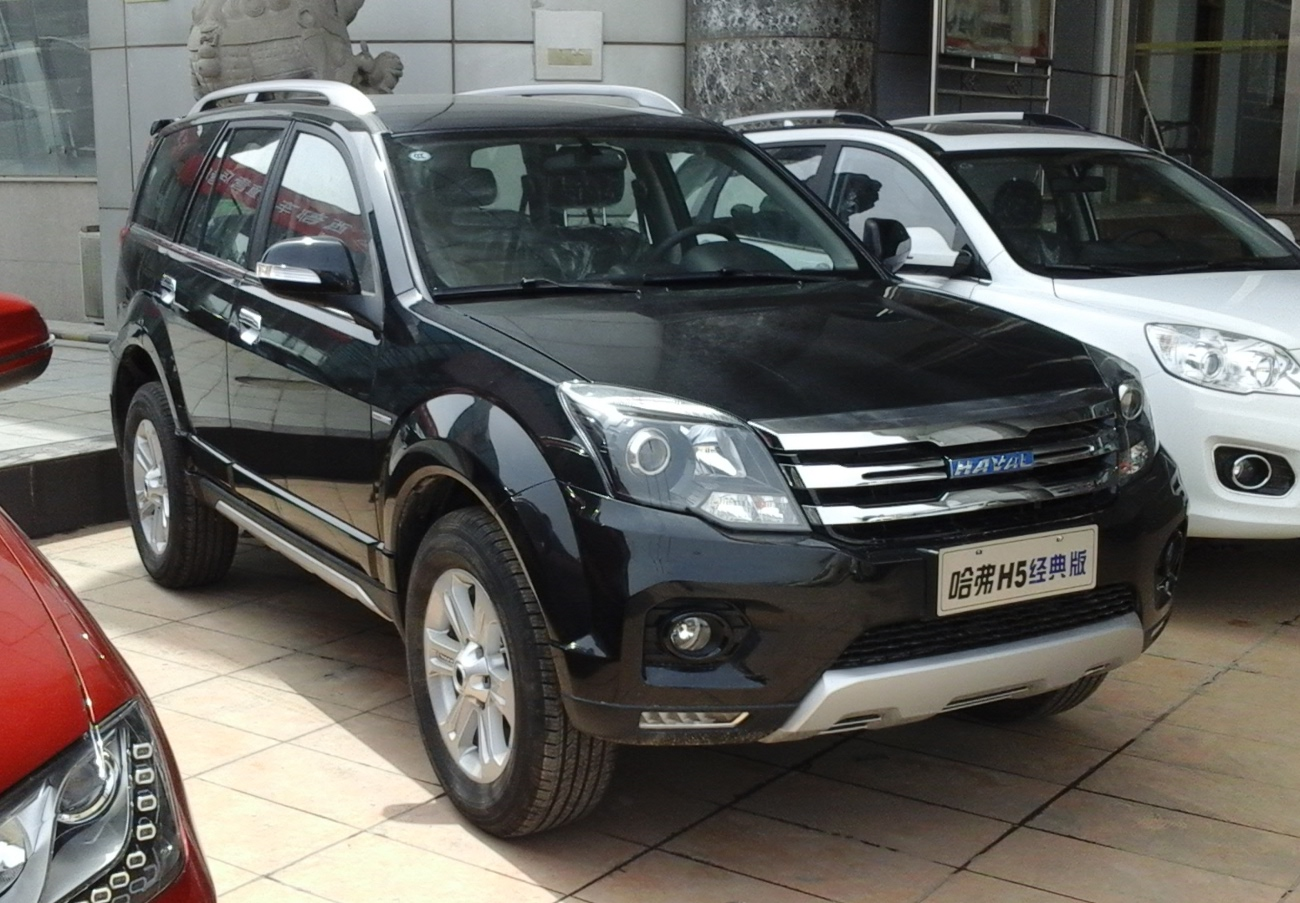
A post-facelift Haval H5 Blue Label front.

=== Variations ===
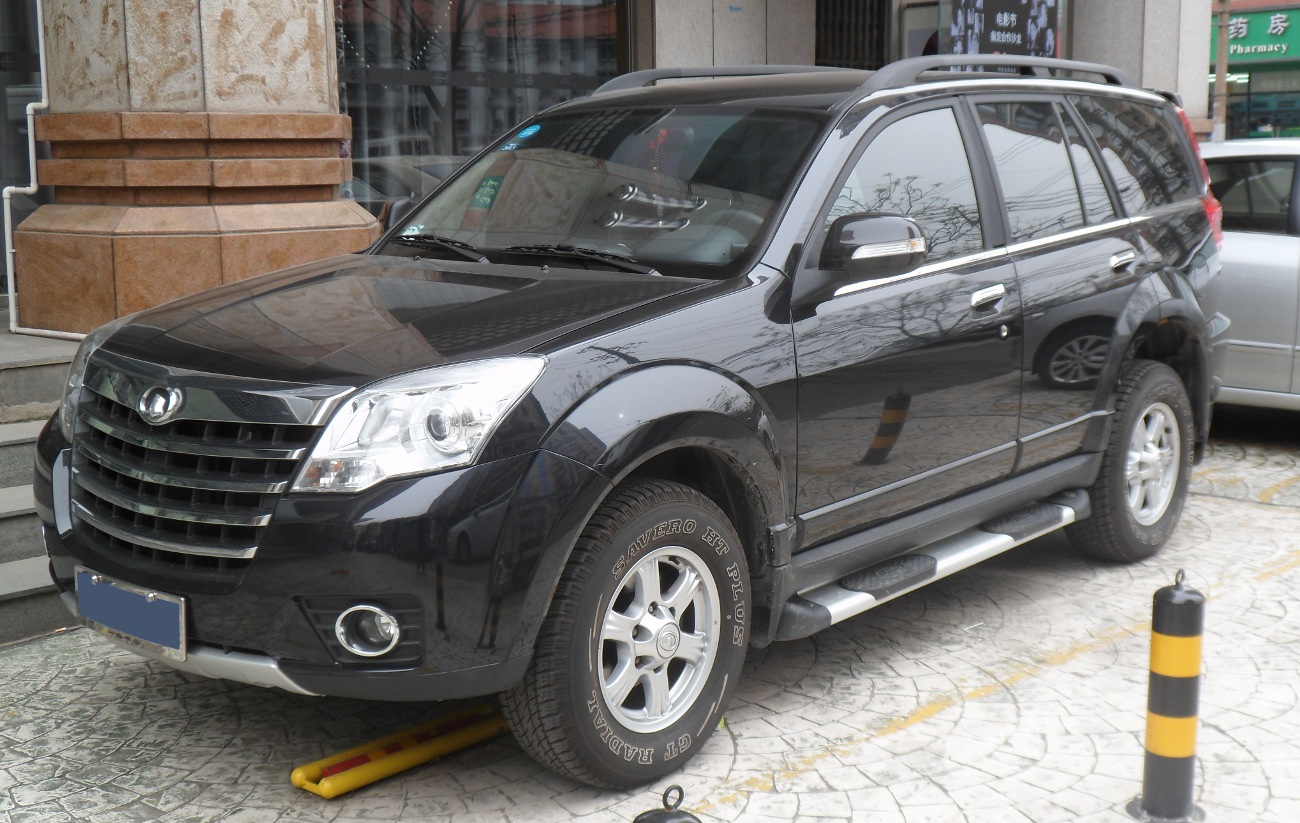
Great Wall Haval H5 GKC Edition

A slightly different version, with a typical large grille and called the GKC Edition was also produced, but only for the Chinese market. This version was facelifted in July 2011 and was known as the Zhizun.

=== Safety ===
ANCAP test results* GWM X240 (2010)
| Test | Score |
|---|---|
| Overall | 4 /5 stars |
| Frontal offset | 9.48/16 |
| Side impact | 16/16 |
| Pole | Not Assessed |
| Seat belt reminders | 0/3 |
| Whiplash protection | Not Assessed |
| Pedestrian protection | Pending |
| Electronic stability control | Not Available |

== Second generation (2023–present) ==
Haval H5
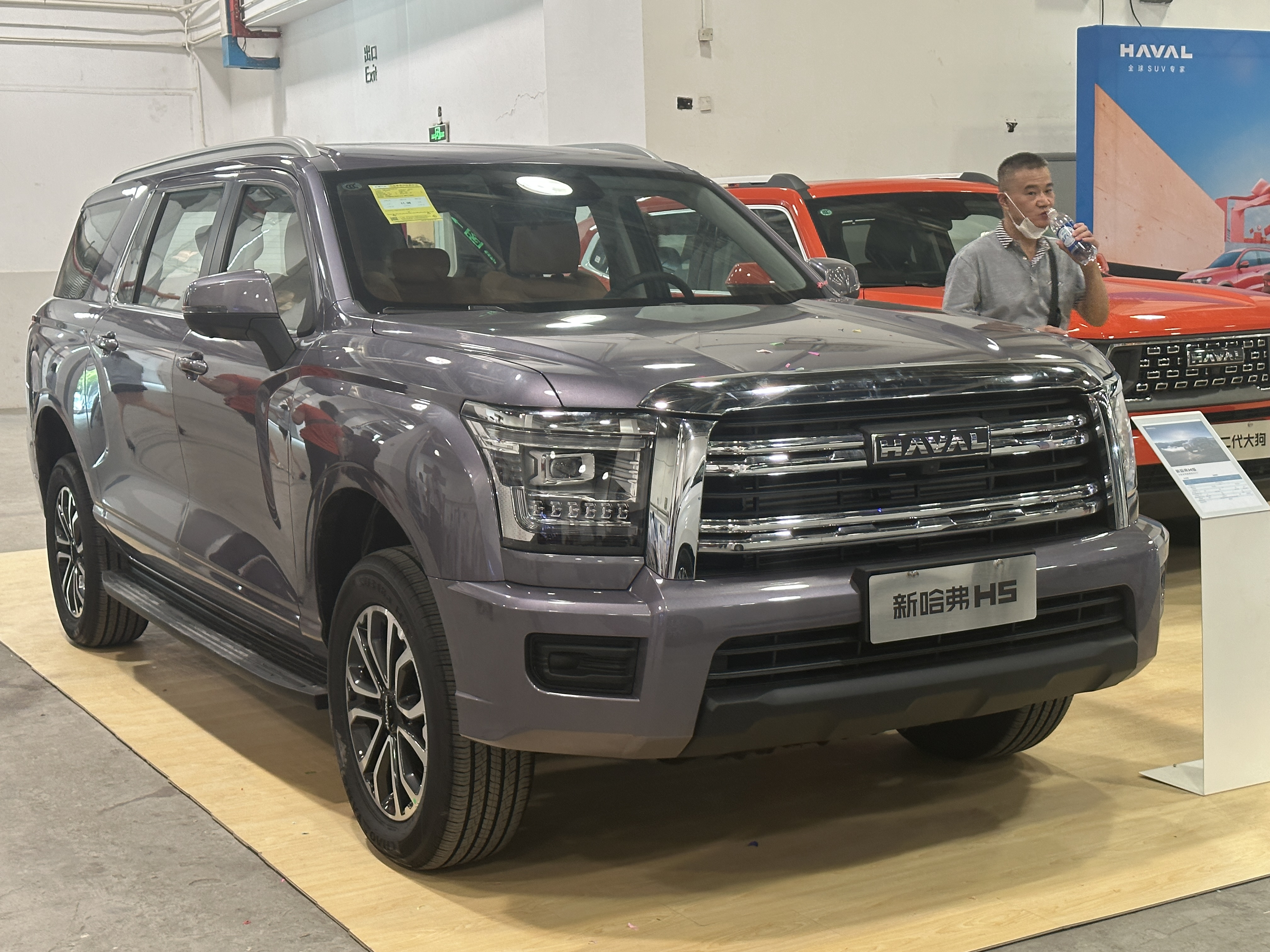

Overview
- Also called: Haval P04
- Production: 2023–present
- Assembly: China: Baoding

Body and chassis
- Class: Full Size SUV (J)
- Body style: 5-door SUV
- Layout: Front-engine, rear-wheel drive Front-engine, four-wheel drive
- Related: Great Wall King Kong Cannon

Powertrain
- Engine: Petrol: 2.0 L GW4G20C turbo I4; Diesel: 2.0 L GW4D20M turbodiesel I4
- Power output: Petrol: 165 kW (221 hp; 224 PS); Diesel: 122 kW (164 hp; 166 PS)
- Transmission: 6-speed manual 8-speed automatic

Dimensions
- Wheelbase: 3,140 mm (123.6 in)
- Length: 5,190 mm (204.3 in)
- Width: 1,905 mm (75.0 in)
- Height: 1,835 mm (72.2 in)
- Curb weight: 2630kg

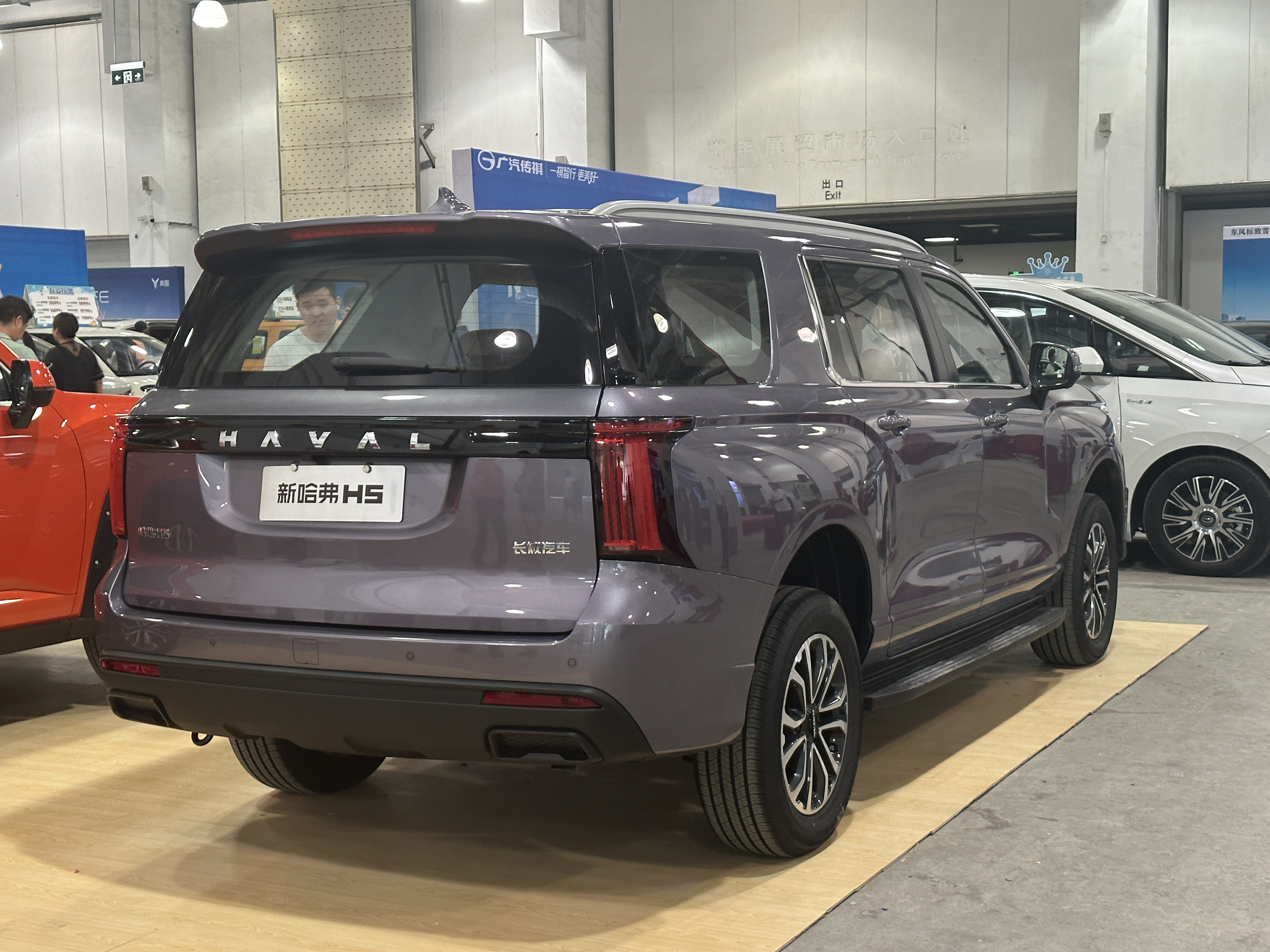
Haval H5 II rear

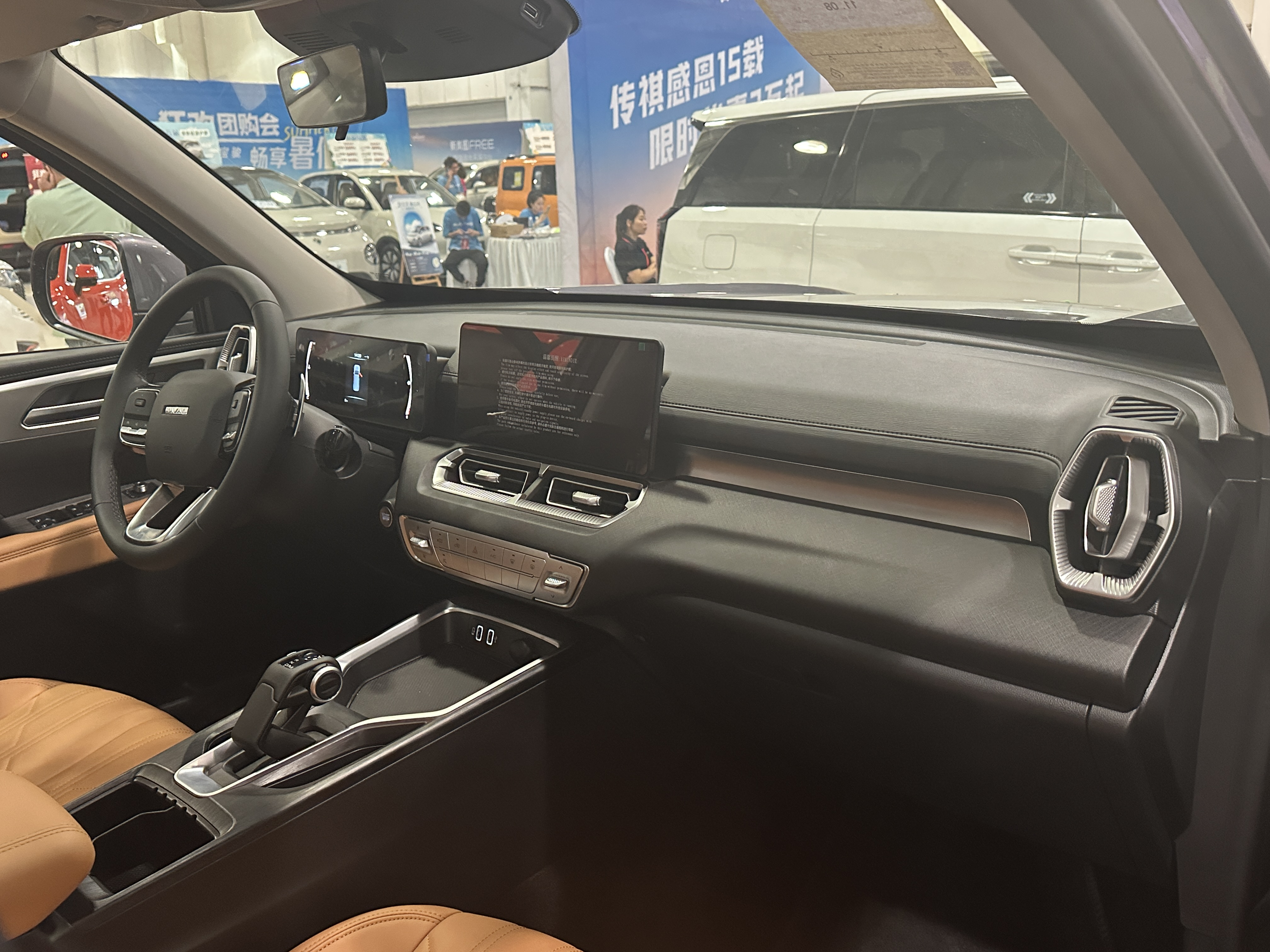
Haval H5 II interior

The second generation Haval H5 is revived in March 2023, classified as a full-size SUV based on the same platform as the Great Wall King Kong Cannon. The engine of the second generation Haval H5 is a 2.0-litre turbo engine producing a maximum power of 165 kW (221 hp). A 2.0-litre turbo diesel engine producing 122 kW (164 hp) is also offered. The 2.6+ metre roof rack supports 200 kg, twice as much as the typical 80 to 100 kg max roof load of similarly sized large SUVs.

== Sales ==
| Year | China |
|---|---|
| 2023 | 6,308 |
| 2024 | 9,469 |
| 2025 | 9,629 |
