= Great Wall King Kong Cannon =

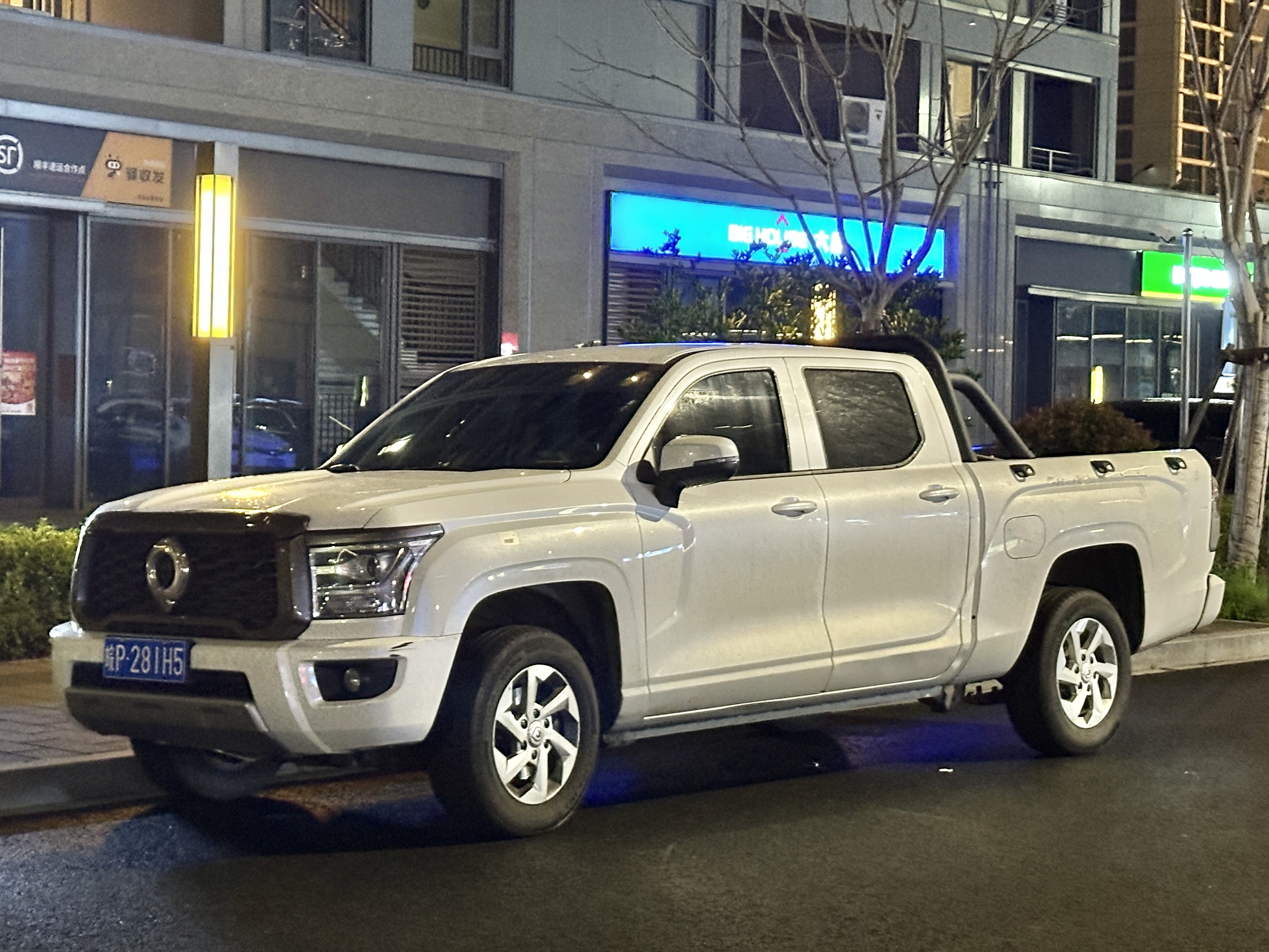

Overview
- Manufacturer: Great Wall Motors
- Also called: GWM Jinggang Pao; GWM King Kong
- Production: 2021–present
- Model years: 2021–present
- Assembly: China: Baoding (GWM)

Body and chassis
- Class: Full-size pickup truck
- Body style: 4-door double cab
- Layout: Front-engine, rear-wheel drive Front-engine, four-wheel drive Rear-motor, rear-wheel drive (Electric)
- Related: Haval H5

Powertrain
- Engine: 2.0 L GW4C20B inline-4 DOHC turbo gasoline engine 2.0 L GW4D20M inline-4 DOHC turbo diesel engine
- Electric motor: 201 hp (204 PS) Permanent magnet motor (Pao EV)
- Transmission: 6-speed manual

Dimensions
- Wheelbase: Regular version: 3,140 mm (124 in); Long bed version: 3,410 mm (134 in)
- Length: Regular version: 5,365 mm (211 in); Long bed version: 5,635 mm (222 in)
- Width: 1,880 mm (74 in)
- Height: Regular version: 1,815 mm (71 in); Long bed version: 1,840 mm (72 in)

The Great Wall King Kong Cannon (Chinese: 長城 金刚炮) is a range of full-size pickup trucks manufactured in China by the Chinese manufacturer Great Wall Motors under the Cannon or Poer pickup series since 2021.

== Overview ==
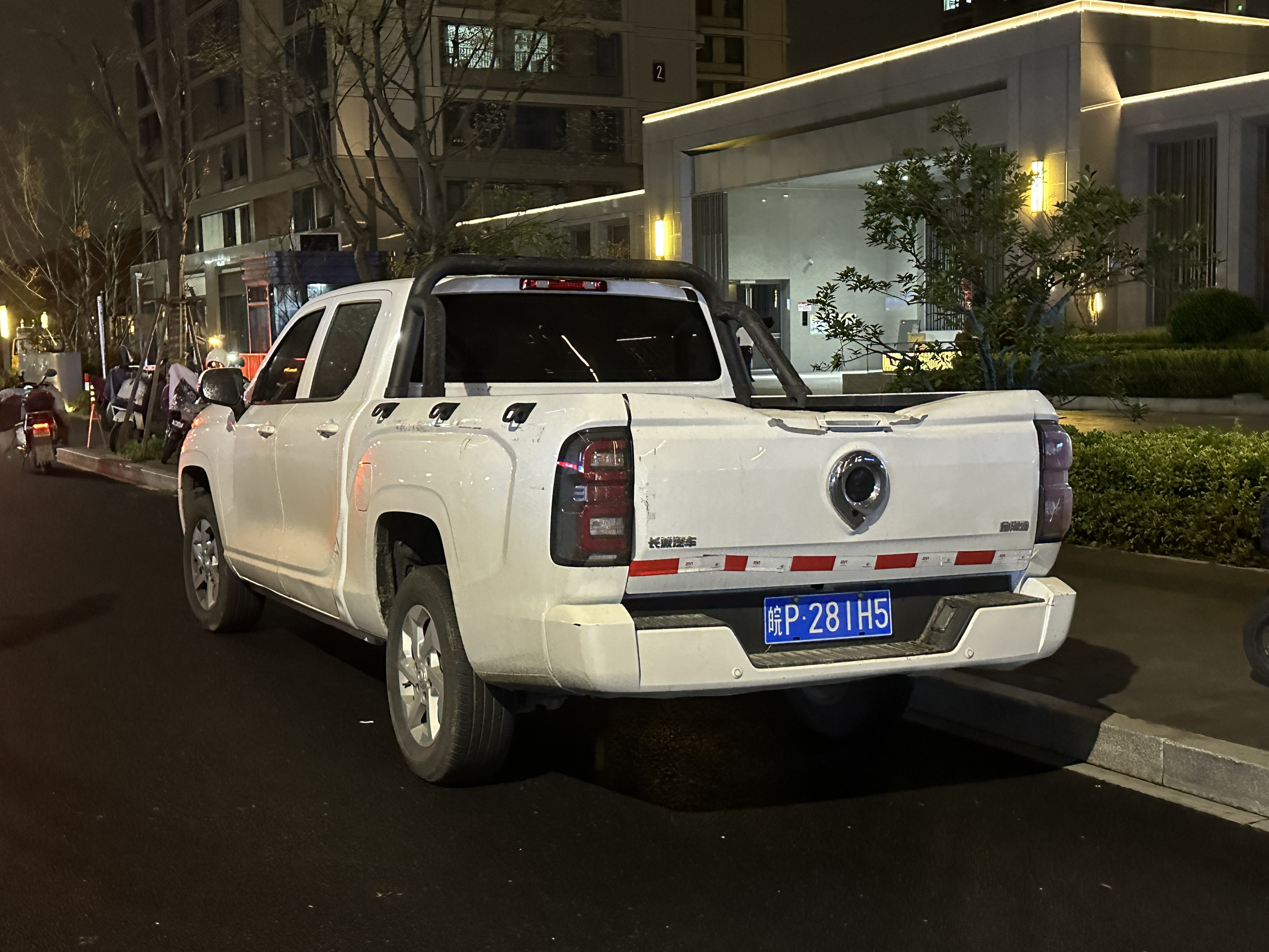
Great Wall King Kong Cannon rear

The Great Wall King Kong Cannon debuted in November 2021 during the 2021 Auto Guangzhou. It was first previewed as a concept called the GWM X-Pao or GWM X Cannon in Auto Shanghai 2021. Available as a regular version and a long bed version, the Max load capacity of the Great Wall King Kong Cannon is 500 kilograms. The Great Wall King Kong Cannon shares the same power plant as the GWM Cannon, which is a 2.0-litre petrol and 2.0-litre diesel engines. The petrol engine produces 140kW (197 hp), and the diesel engine is available with either 110kW or 120kW (165 hp).
