= Great Wall Safe =

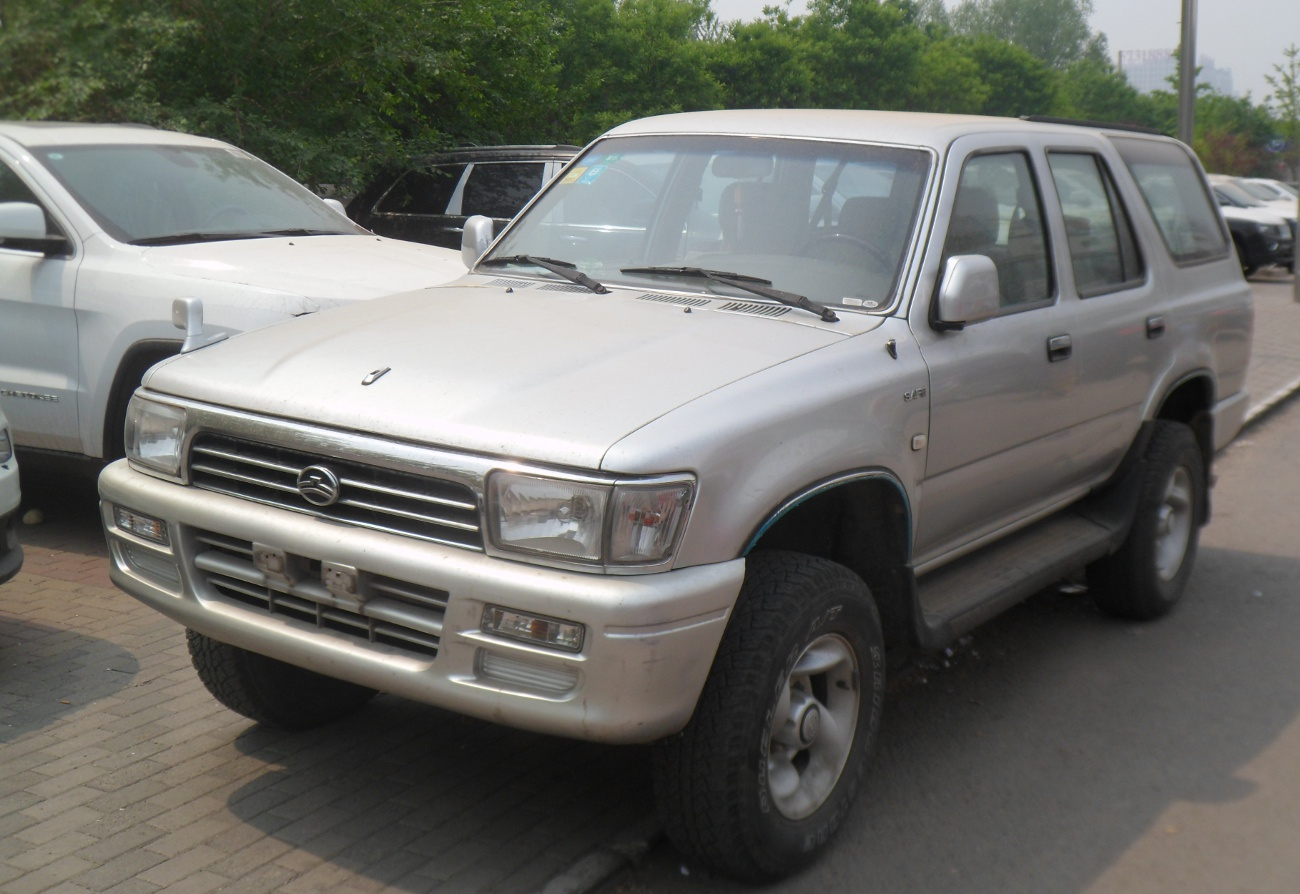

Overview
- Manufacturer: Great Wall Motors
- Production: 2002–2009

Body and chassis
- Class: Compact SUV
- Body style: 5-door SUV
- Layout: Front-engine, rear-wheel-drive or four-wheel-drive
- Related: Great Wall Deer

Powertrain
- Engine: 2.2 L GW491QE I4 (petrol)
- Transmission: 5-speed manual

Dimensions
- Wheelbase: 2,615 mm (103 in)
- Length: 4,560–4,860 mm (180–191 in)
- Width: 1,725–1,780 mm (68–70 in)
- Height: 1,770–1,820 mm (70–72 in)
- Curb weight: 1,965–2,085 kg (4,332.1–4,596.6 lb)

Chronology
- Successor: Great Wall Haval H3

The Great Wall Safe (Chinese: 长城赛弗; pinyin: Chángchéng Sàifú) is a sport utility vehicle (SUV) produced by the Chinese manufacturer Great Wall Motors from 2002 to 2009.

== Overview ==
The Great Wall Safe has been available in a four-wheel-drive and a rear-wheel-drive configuration.

It has a strong resemblance to the second generation Toyota 4Runner, on the platform of which it is considered to be built. Just like the Great Wall Deer which is the pickup version of the Great Wall Safe, it is said to have been successful in China at the date of its launch, due to its low price.

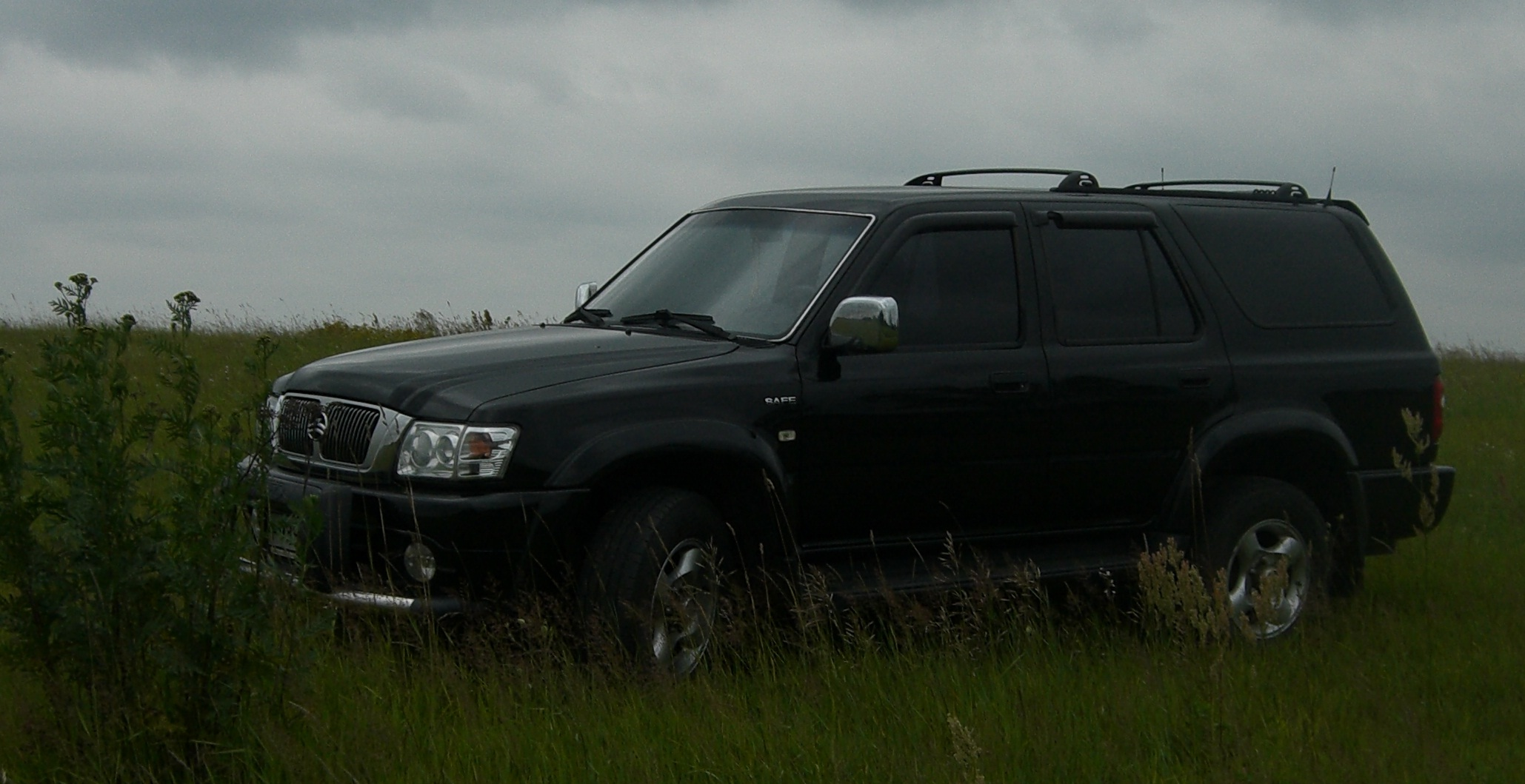
Front view of the Great Wall Safe base model.

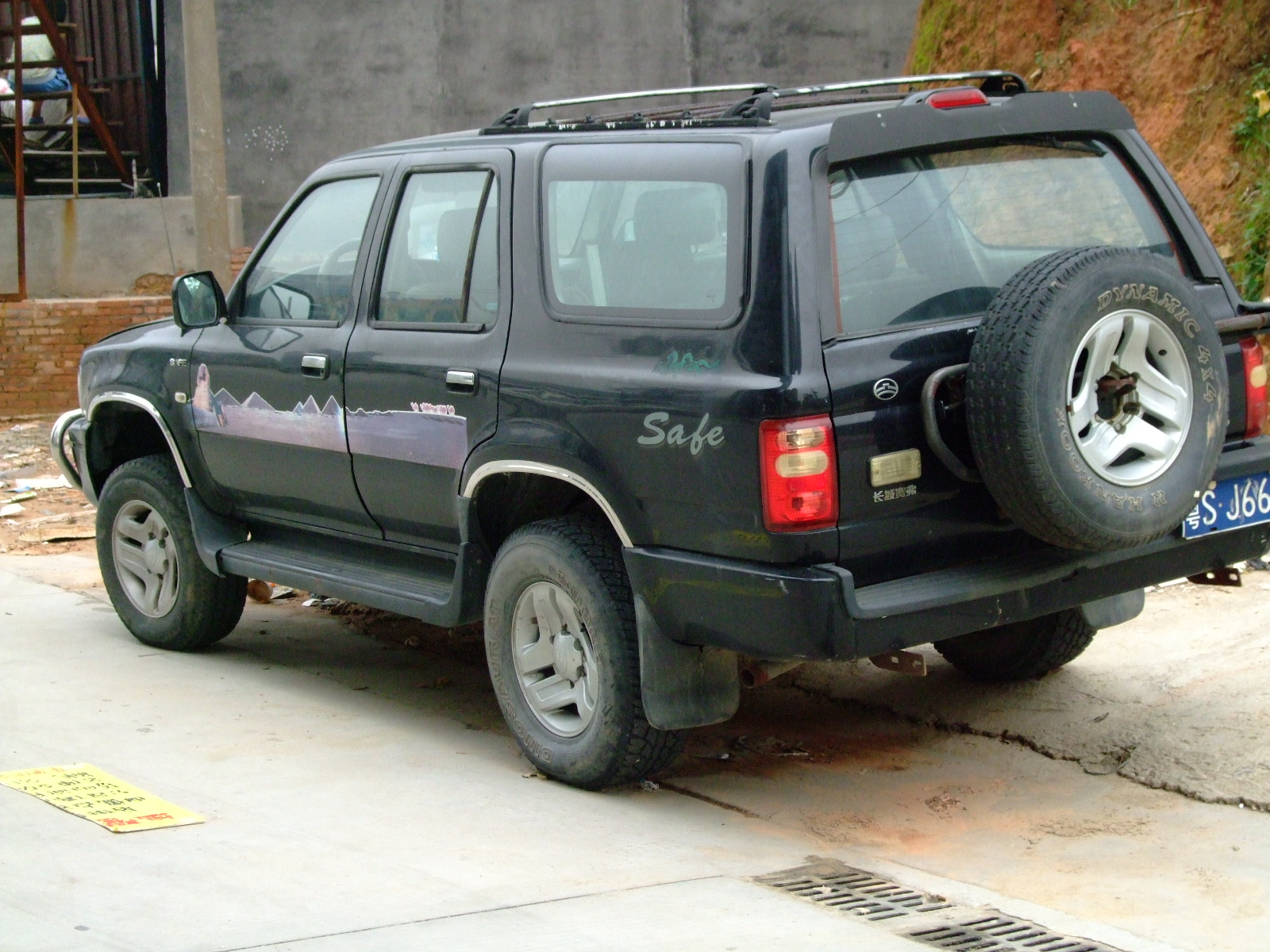
Rear view of the Great Wall Safe base model.

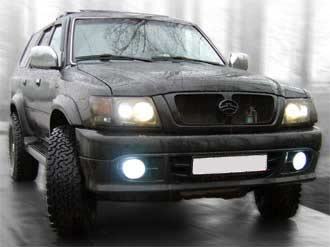
Front view of the Great Wall Safe.

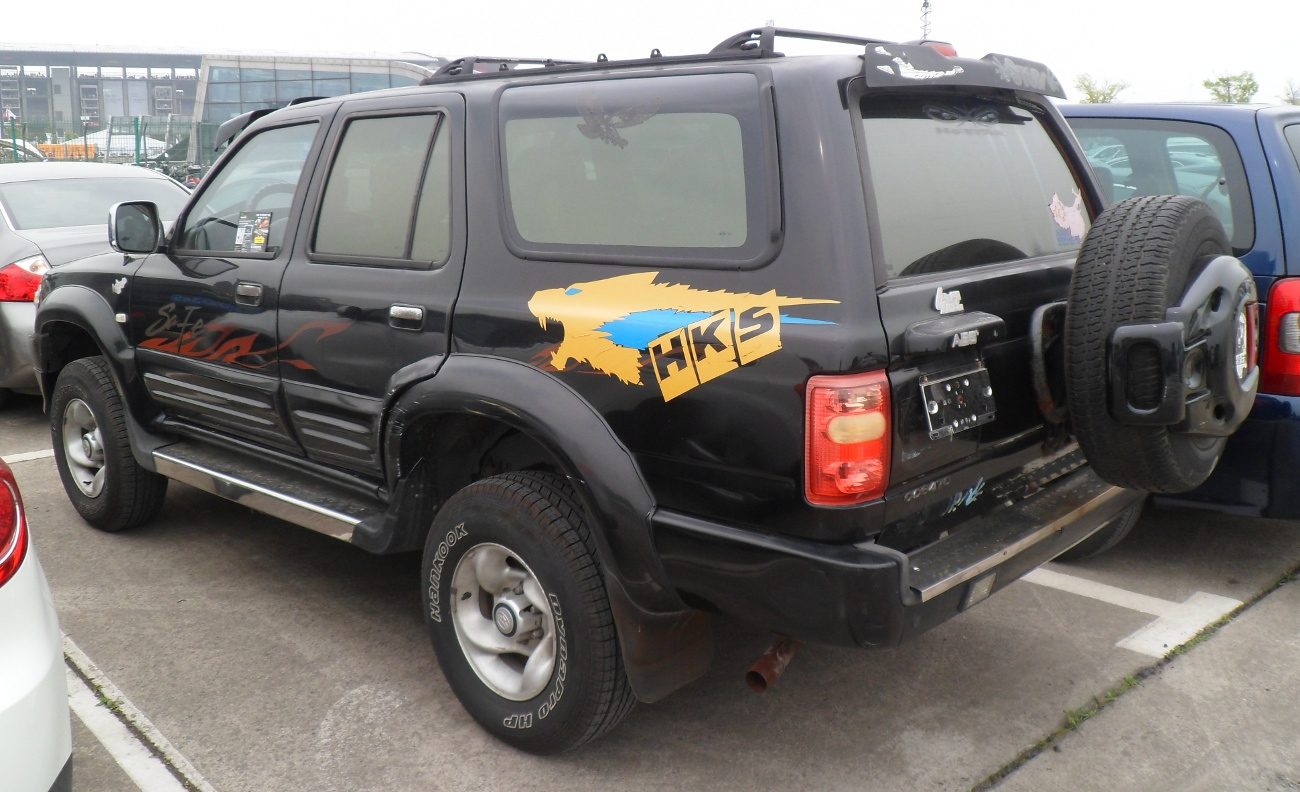
Rear view of the Great Wall Safe.
