= Great Wall Haval H3 =

Haval H3
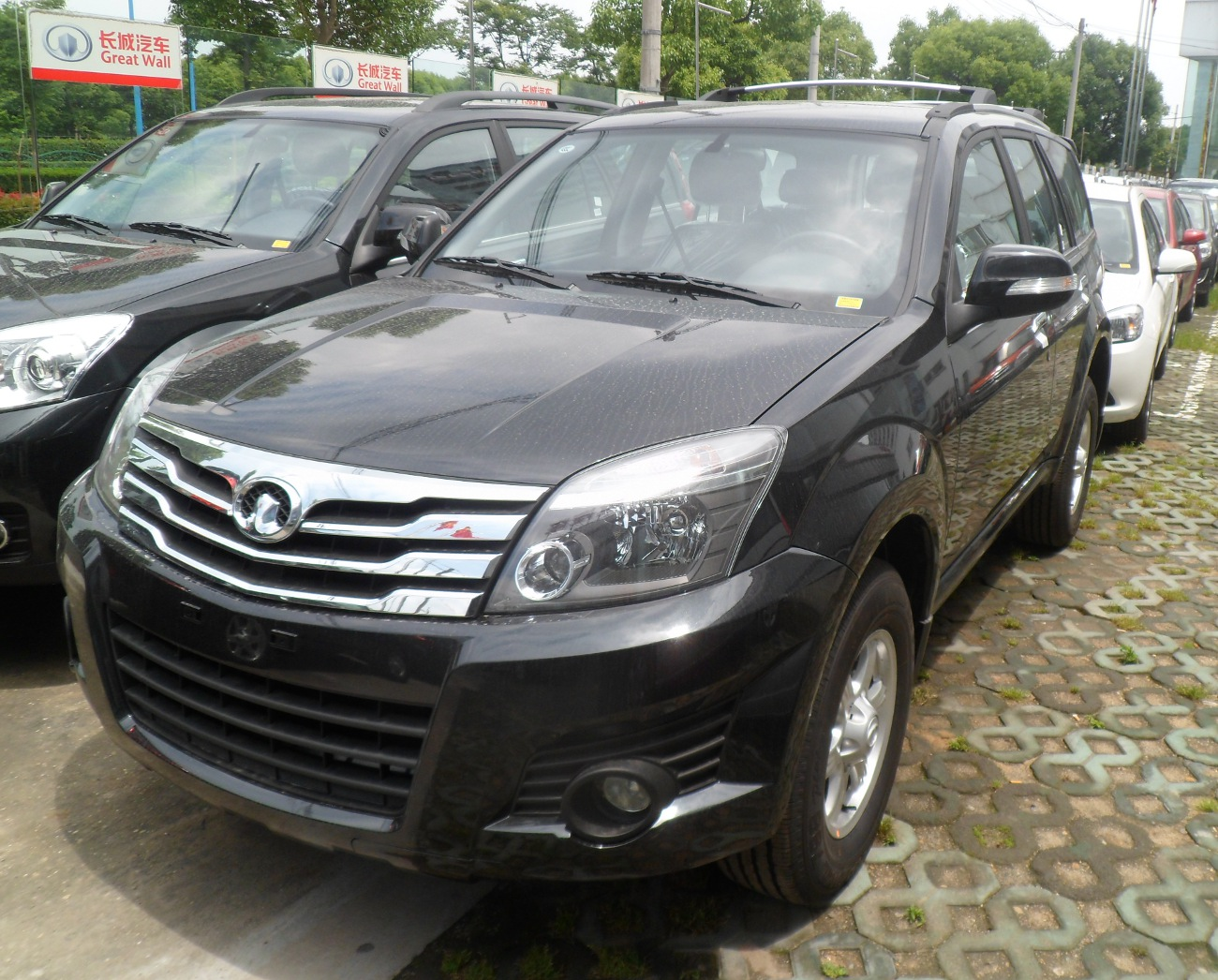

Overview
- Manufacturer: Great Wall Motors
- Also called: Great Wall Hover; Great Wall Hover CUV; Great Wall Hover H3; Great Wall Hafu; Great Wall X240 (Australia); Pyeonghwa Ppeokkuggi 2406 (North Korea)
- Production: 2005–2012
- Model years: 2006–2012

Body and chassis
- Class: Compact SUV
- Body style: 5-door wagon
- Layout: Front-engine, rear-wheel drive Front-engine, four-wheel drive

Powertrain
- Engine: 2.0 L 4G63 I4 (petrol) (2009–2012); 2.4 L 4G64 I4 (petrol) (2005–2009); 2.4 L 4G69 I4 (petrol) (2007–2010); 2.5 L GW2.5TCI I4 (diesel) (2009–2012); 2.8 L GW2.8TC I4 (diesel) (2006–2009)
- Transmission: 5-speed manual 4-speed M88 automatic

Dimensions
- Wheelbase: 2,700 mm (106.3 in)
- Length: 4,620 mm (181.9 in)/4,650 mm (183.1 in)
- Width: 1,800 mm (70.9 in)
- Height: 1,810 mm (71.3 in)
- Curb weight: 1,720 kg (3,792.0 lb)

Chronology
- Predecessor: Great Wall Safe
- Successor: Haval H5 (SUV); Haval H6 Coupe (Crossover SUV)

The Great Wall Haval H3 (Chinese: 长城哈弗; pinyin: Chángchéng Hāfú), also known as the Great Wall Hover, is a compact sport utility vehicle (SUV) produced by the Chinese manufacturer Great Wall Motors from April 2005 to 2012.

It was the first Chinese car to be exported in large quantities to Western Europe in 2006, with 30,000 units shipped to Italy. Its main advantage over established European, North American and Asian rivals is its low comparative cost. A six-speed automatic concept version called the Great Wall Hover H7 was made and can reach speeds of up to 225 km/h or 140 mph.

In Australia, it was badged as the Great Wall X240 until 2011, when the X240 nameplate was used on the Haval H5.

== Design and engineering ==
One of the reasons for the comparatively low retail price of the Great Wall Haval H3 is that it is based heavily on older models by other manufacturers. The entry-level engine is the 4G64 2.4 litre gasoline inline-four supplied by Mitsubishi, the exterior resembles the Isuzu Axiom and the chassis is also Isuzu similar if not the same as the Isuzu MU, contrary to media reports that it was a Toyota 4Runner Chassis. The Haval H3 has a wheelbase of 2,700 mm (106.3 in) and a wheel track of 1,520 mm (59.8 in). The Haval H3 is a sport utility vehicle, with selectable rear-wheel-drive or four-wheel drive.

== Gallery ==
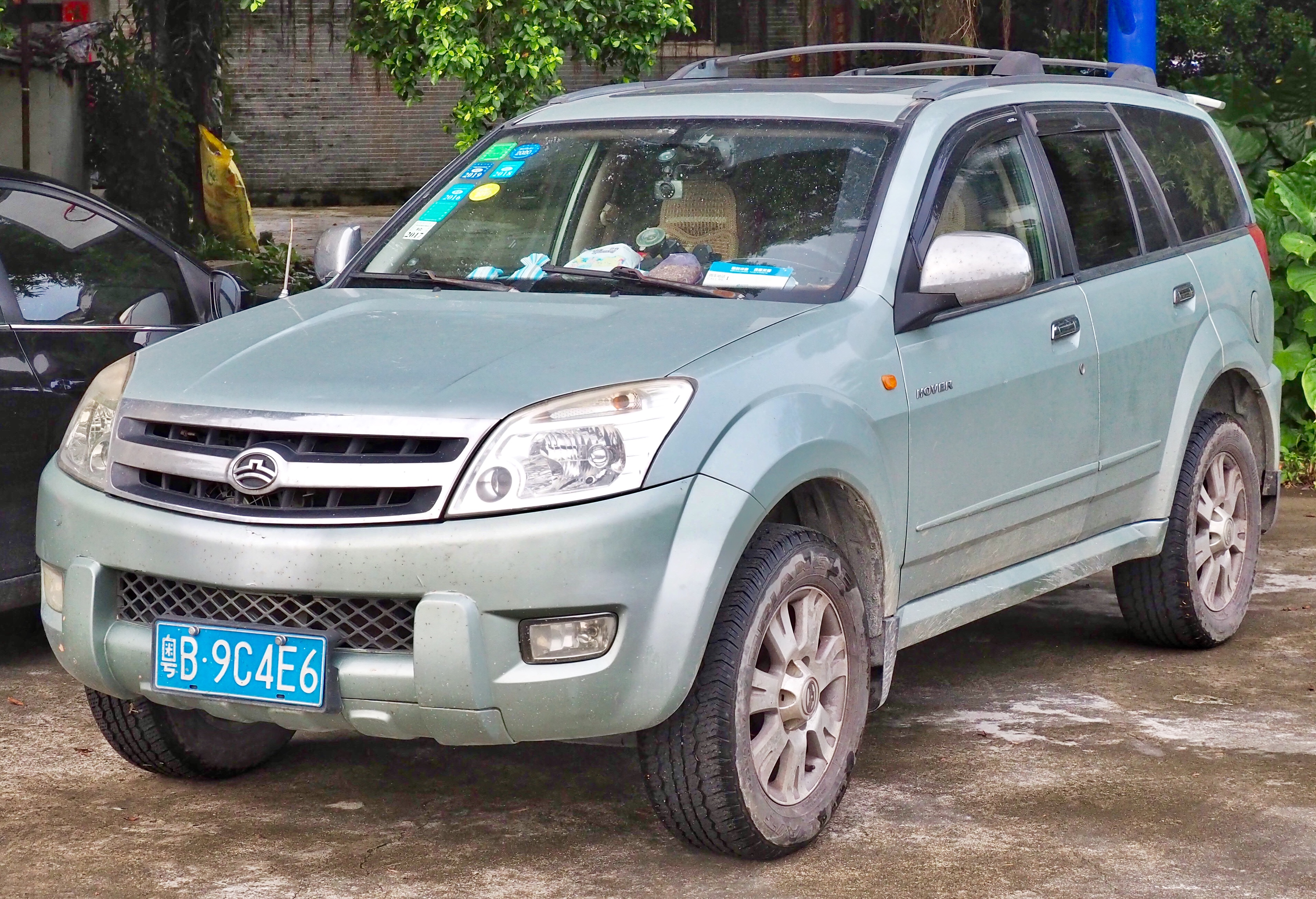
Great Wall Hover

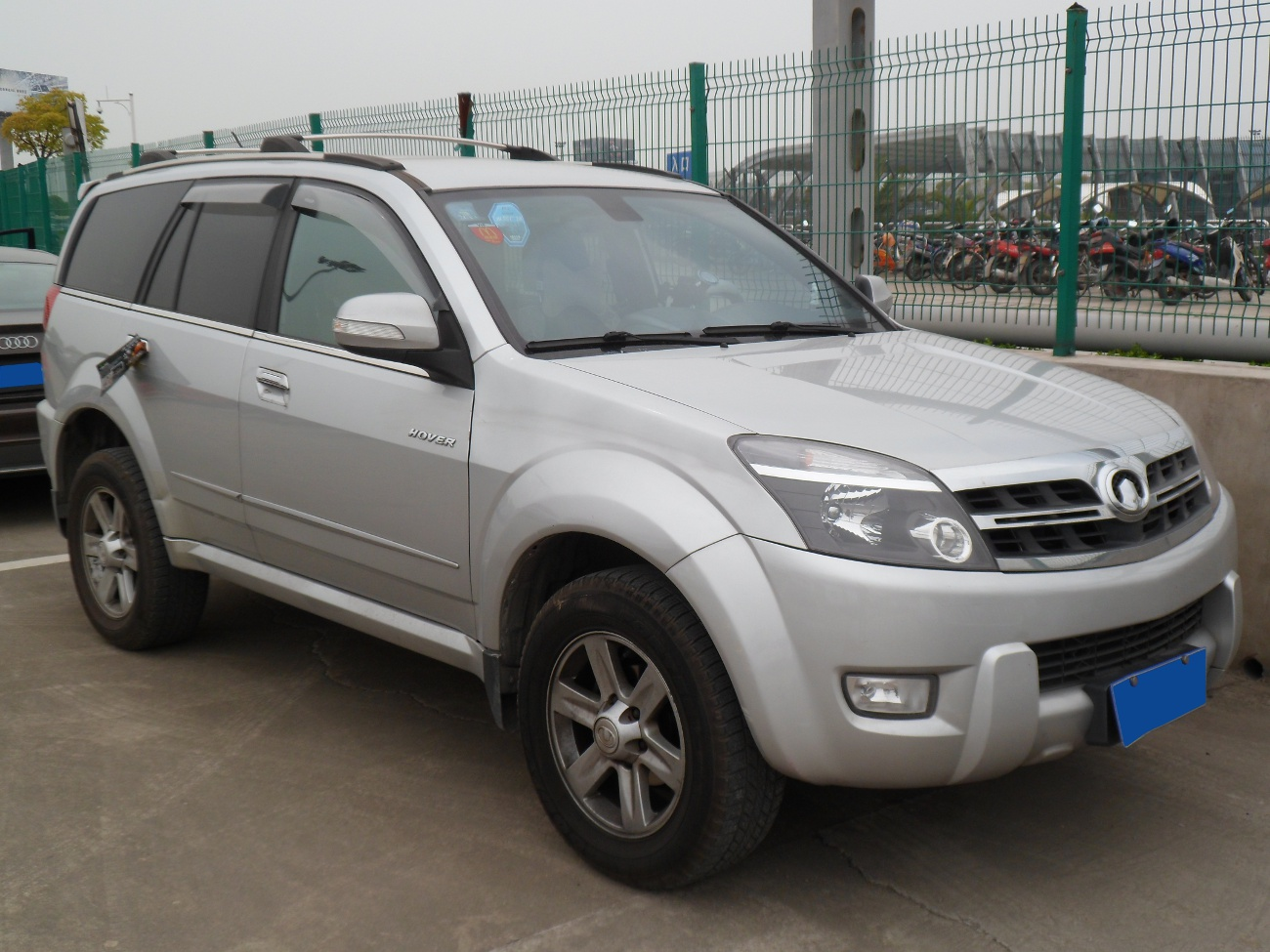
Post-facelift Great Wall Haval H3 front

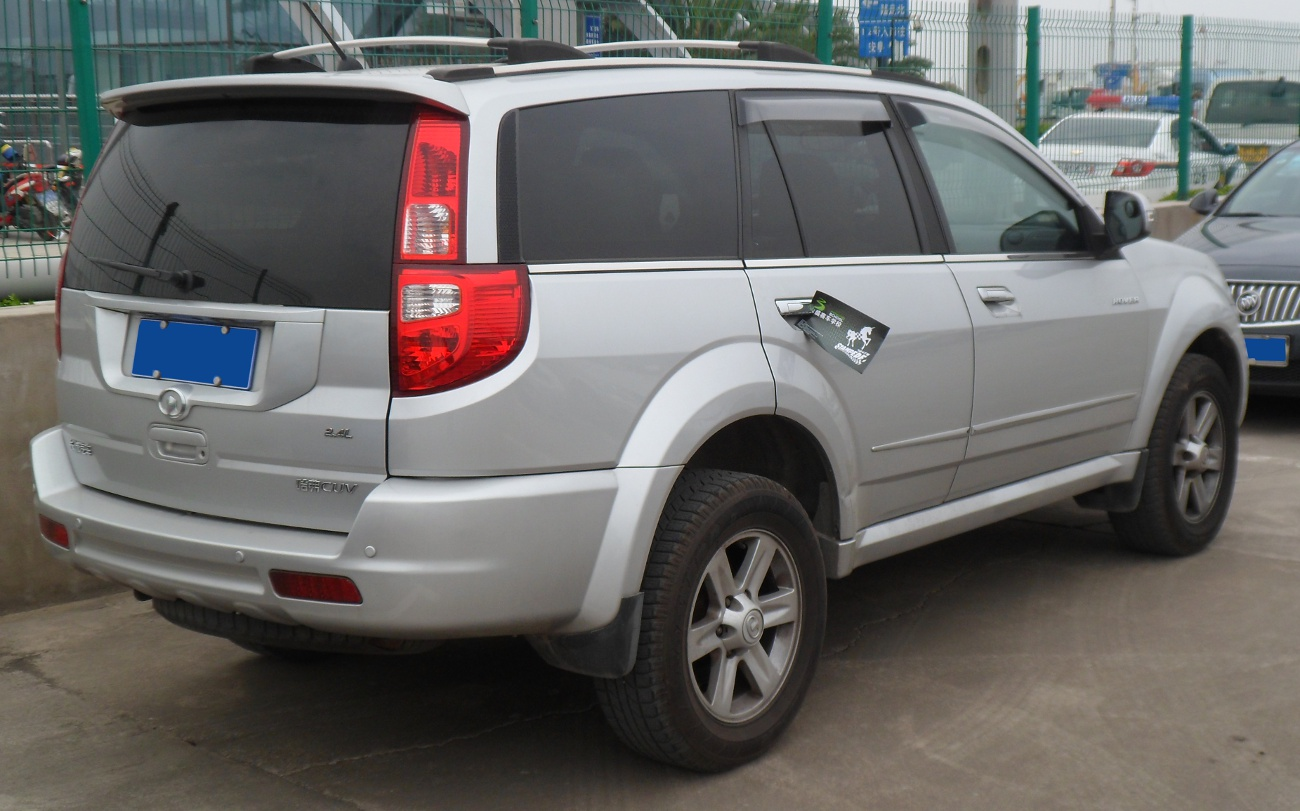
Post-facelift Great Wall Haval H3 rear

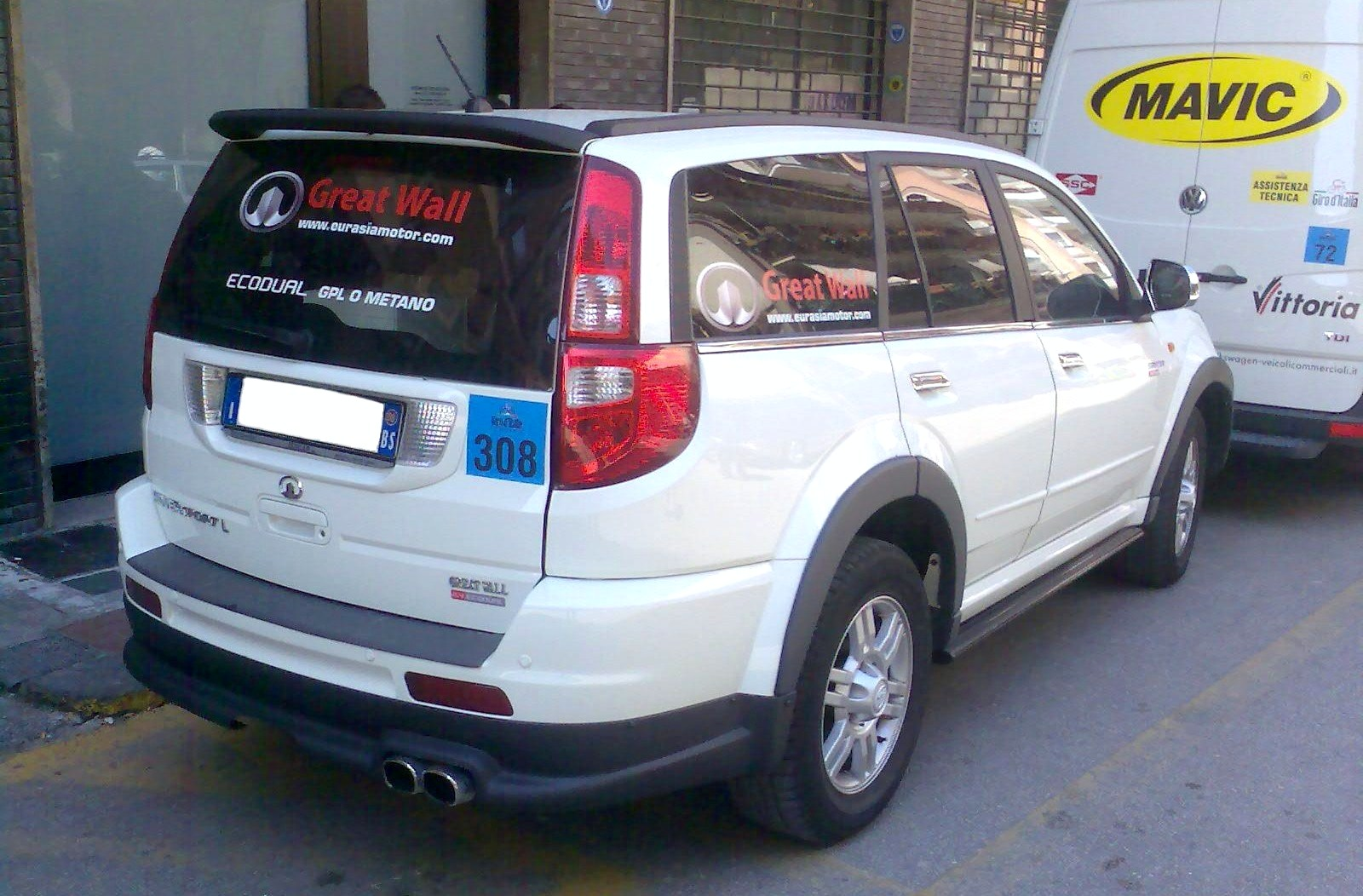
Great Wall Hover with Sportkit

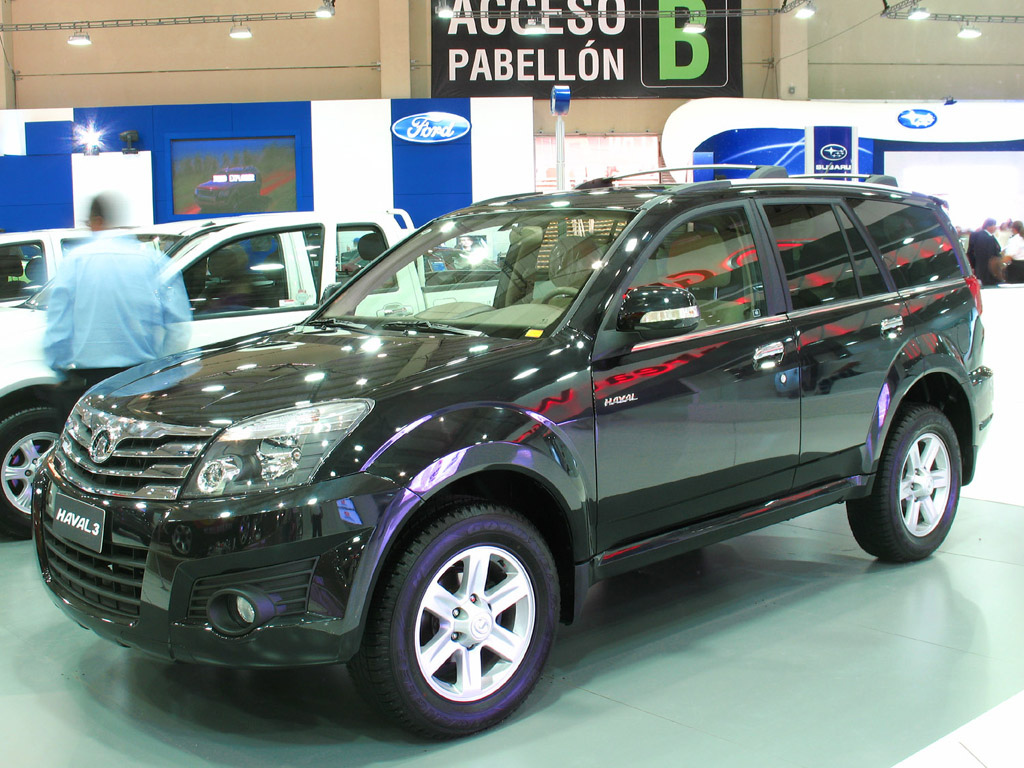
2010 Haval H3

== Engines and transmission ==
The gasoline-fuelled Great Wall Haval H3 uses the Mitsubishi 4G69 Sirius series straight-4 automobile engine. The 4G64 engine was introduced in 1988 in the Mitsubishi Galant and has been used by several other car manufacturers. The 4G64 engine produces 128 hp (95 kW) and was used in H3s from the 2005 to 2009 model year. The other Mitsubishi engine, the 2.4 litre 4G69, was used in models from 2007 to 2010. The diesel version uses a motor built by Great Wall themselves, the GW2.8TC. Both versions have a 5-gear manual transmission. Those models had the name Hover H3 and H5. For the Chinese market, Great Wall also offered a 2.5 litre and 2.8 litre TCI diesel engine with 107 hp (80 kW) and 114 hp (85 kW) respectively. These engines both use a modern common rail system from Bosch. The 2.8 litre diesel engine was used in models from 2006 to 2009 while the 2.5 litre version was available from 2009 to 2012. Both diesel engines were turbocharged.

== Environmental and safety test ==
One of the main problems facing exported Chinese cars was European safety and environmental regulations. The Great Wall Haval H3 complies with the Euro-III emissions standard. It was awarded three stars from C-NCAP crash testing. In the Australasian New Car Assessment Program (ANCAP) crash testing undertaken on 24 March 2010, the post-2009 model Haval 3 received a Four Star rating. The Great Wall Haval H3 has not yet been tested by Euro NCAP. With new engines which Great Wall Motor installed in the Haval H3, all models now comply with Euro 4 regulations. In Italy, a version of the Hover called the EcoDual is sold equipped to run on alternatives fuels, being equipped with LPG or CNG capabilities. From the 2009 market year, the vehicle has a Euro 4 compliant engine which was also installed in Hover 5.

== Limousine version ==
Great Wall Hover Pi
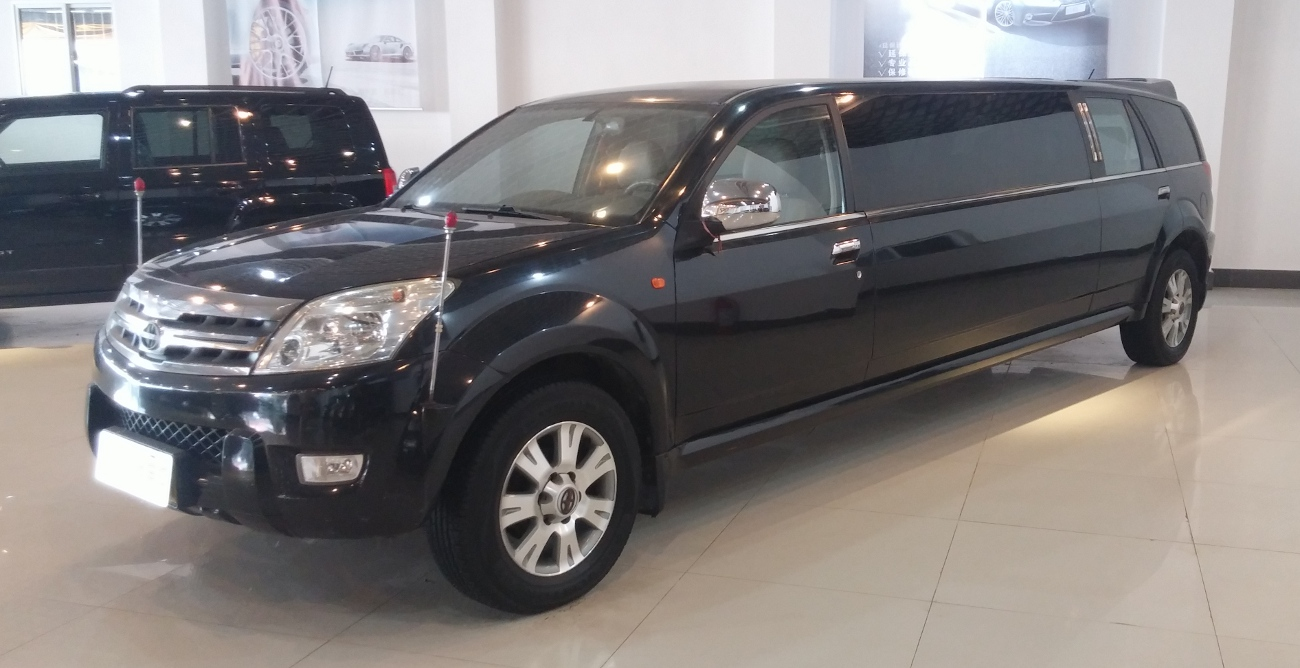

Overview
- Also called: Great Wall Hover π

Body and chassis
- Class: Limousine crossover SUV

Powertrain
- Engine: 2.4 L 4G64 I4 (petrol)
- Transmission: 5-speed manual

Dimensions
- Wheelbase: 4,800 mm (189.0 in); 4,950 mm (194.9 in) (2008)
- Length: 6,720 mm (264.6 in); 6,870 mm (270.5 in) (2008)
- Width: 1,800 mm (70.9 in)
- Height: 1,765 mm (69.5 in)

Great Wall also produced a more luxurious, limousine version of the Hover, called the Great Wall Hover Pi (Chinese: 长城哈弗派). Its name is also sometimes spelt Hover π. The first Hover Pi was given as a gift to Fidel Castro in 2006. The vehicle has so far been the best selling vehicle of its kind^{[a] [b]} (most others originating outside China being stretched by third-party conversion outfits), being exported to Japan, South Korea, France, Italy, Malaysia, Russia, South Africa, and other overseas markets. In 2008, the Hover Pi's length was extended from 6.7 meters to 6.9 meters.

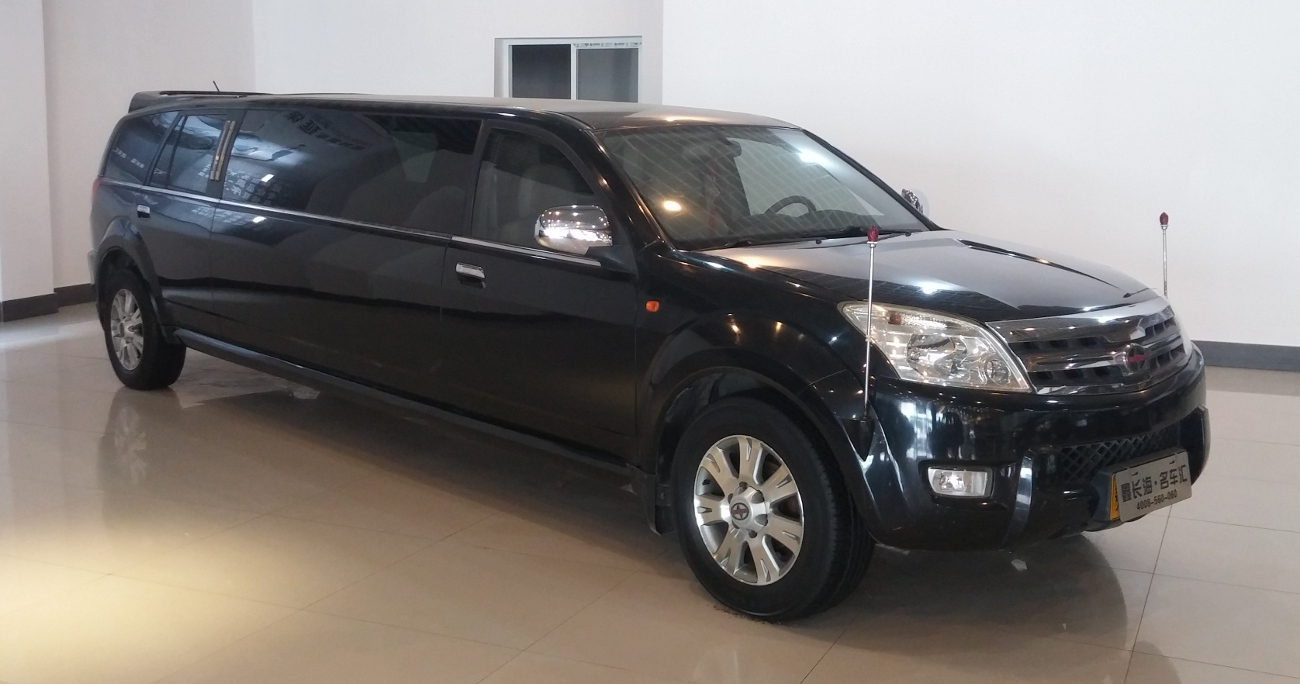
Great Wall Hover Π front.

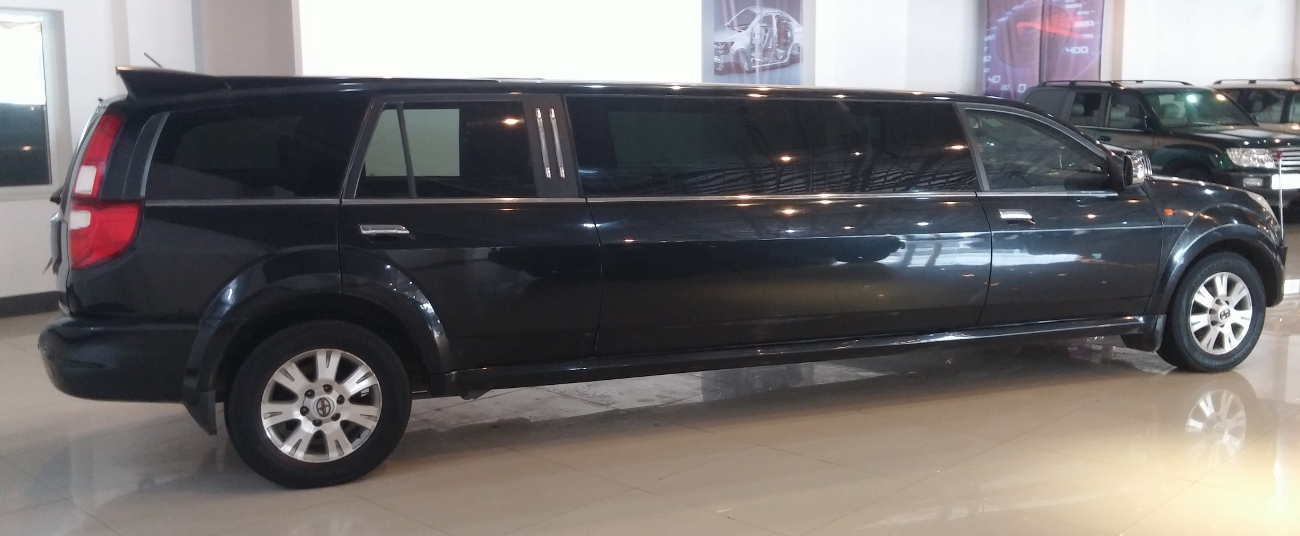
Great Wall Hover Π side.

== Safety ==
ANCAP test results GWM X240 (2010)
Test	Score
Overall	4 /5 stars
Frontal offset	9.48/16
Side impact	16/16
Pole	Not Assessed
Seat belt reminders	0/3
Whiplash protection	Not Assessed
Pedestrian protection	Pending
Electronic stability control	Not Available
