= Wey V9X =

Battery electric and plug-in hybrid mid-size and full-size luxury SUVs

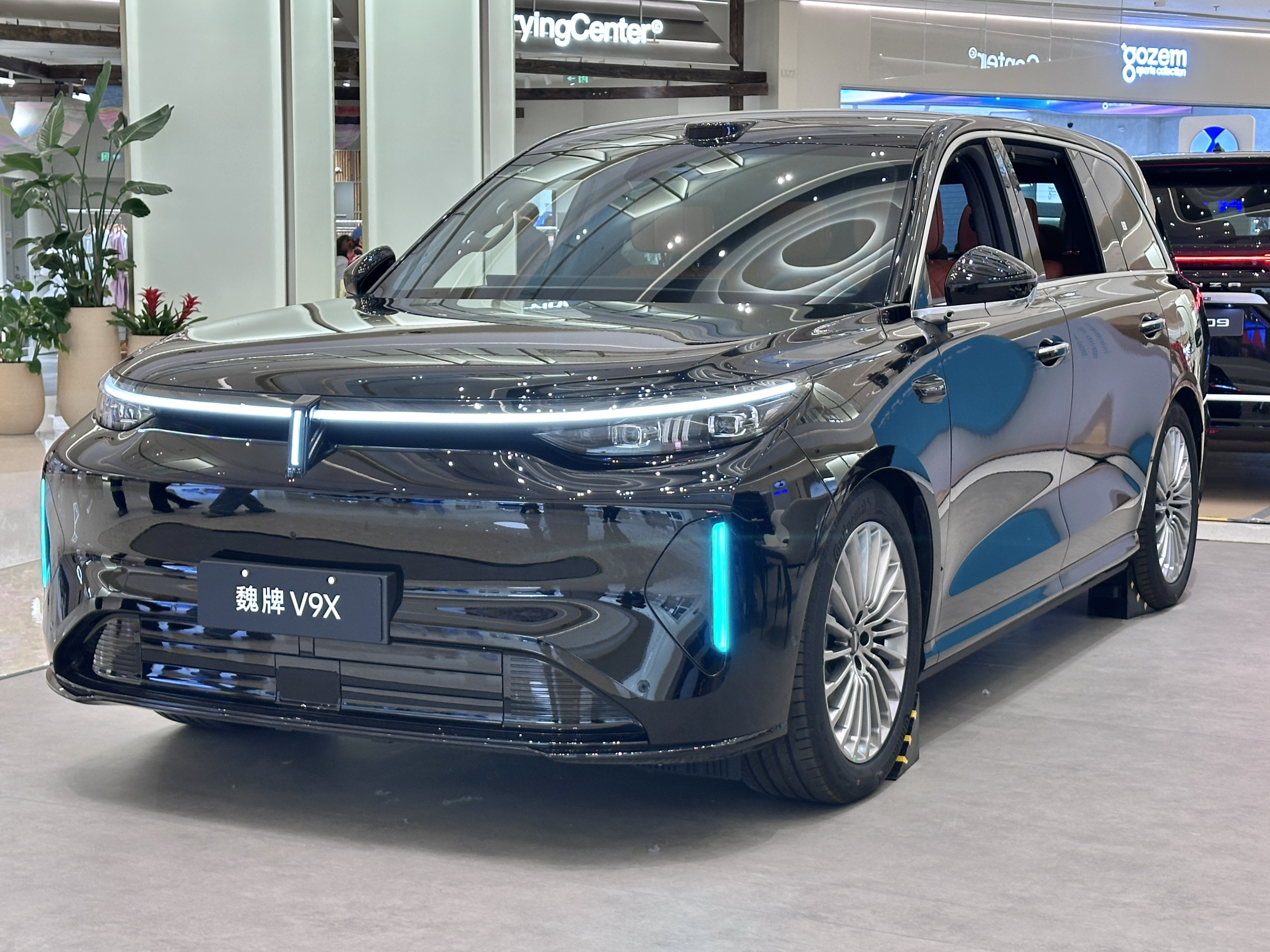

Overview
- Manufacturer: Great Wall Motor
- Model code: DE9
- Also called: Wey V8X (5-seater)
- Production: March 2026 – present
- Assembly: China: Tianjin

Body and chassis
- Class: Mid-size luxury SUV (V8X); Full-size luxury SUV (V9X)
- Body style: 5-door SUV
- Layout: Dual-motors, all-wheel-drive (V8X EV); Front-engine, dual-motor, all-wheel-drive (V8X, V9X PHEV)
- Platform: ONE platform / Guiyuan S (Note: English sources list the platform as the ONE Platform, and Chinese sources list the platform as the Guiyuan S Architecture.)

Powertrain
- Engine: Gasoline plug-in hybrid: 1.5 L turbo I4; 2.0 L turbo I4
- Electric motor: 2× permanent magnet motors; UAES YS220QY234 (front); SVOLT QT70TZ220001 (rear)
- Power output: 450–500 kW (612–680 PS; 603–671 hp) (V8X PHEV, V9X SWB PHEV); 540 kW (734 PS; 724 hp) (V8X EV); 500–550 kW (680–748 PS; 671–738 hp) (V9X LWB PHEV)
- Transmission: 4-speed DHT
- Hybrid drivetrain: Series parallel plug-in hybrid (Hi4)
- Battery: 55.4 – 80 kWh SVOLT NMC (V9X PHEV); 66.6 kWh SVOLT NMC (V8X EV)
- Electric range: 149–225 mi (240–362 km)
- Plug-in charging: 6C

Dimensions
- Wheelbase: 3,050 mm (120.1 in) (SWB); 3,150 mm (124.0 in) (LWB); 2,968 mm (116.9 in) (V8X)
- Length: 5,205 mm (204.9 in) (SWB); 5,299 mm (208.6 in) (LWB); 5,125 mm (201.8 in) (V8X)
- Width: 2,025 mm (79.7 in)
- Height: 1,825 mm (71.9 in)
- Curb weight: 2,740–2,930 kg (6,041–6,460 lb)

The Wey V9X (Chinese: 魏牌V9X; pinyin: Wèipái V9X) is a battery electric and plug-in hybrid mid-size and full-size luxury SUVs produced by Great Wall Motors under the Wey marque.

== Overview ==
In January 2026, The GWM announced their new One Platform that can support combustion power, battery electric power, plug-in hybrids, and hydrogen fuel cell vehicles. On the 17th of the same month the company announced that the first model to be based on the platform would be a full-size crossover SUV under the Wey marque.

On February 3, 2026, it was confirmed that the model would adopt the Wey V9X name. Teaser photos were also revealed via Weibo on the same day. The V9X will enter production in March 2026.

It is anticipated to be a 6-seater with a 2+2+2 seating configuration.

=== Design ===
Wey chose to go with a business-like character for the V9X. A light bar combining the headlights is present at the front, alongside vertical fog lights. The rear uses oval-shaped taillights but continues to use a continuous light bar like the front. Traditional door handles are used instead of retractable door handles. A small amount of chrome trim is present, and two-tone paint schemes will also be available.

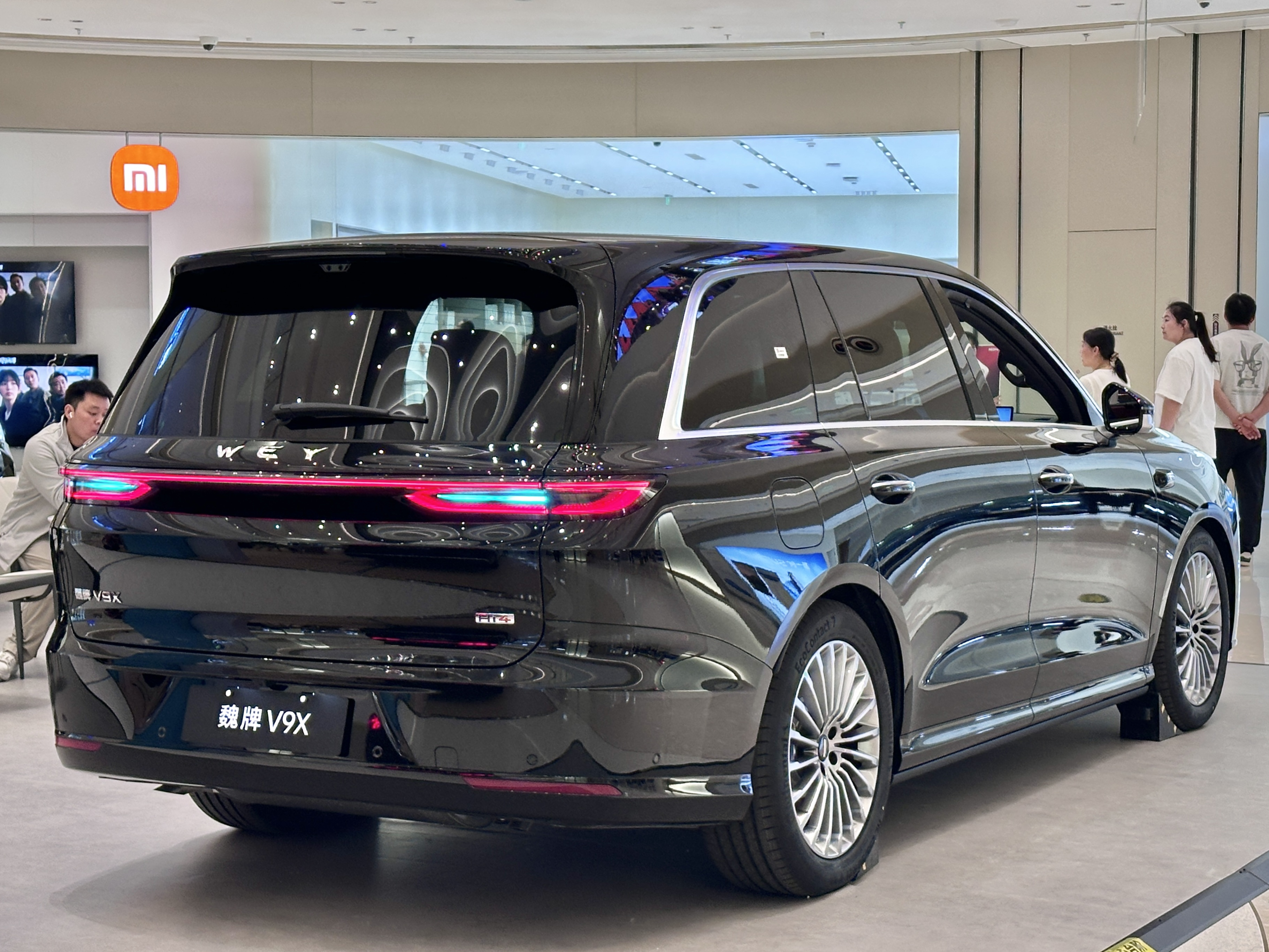
Rear view

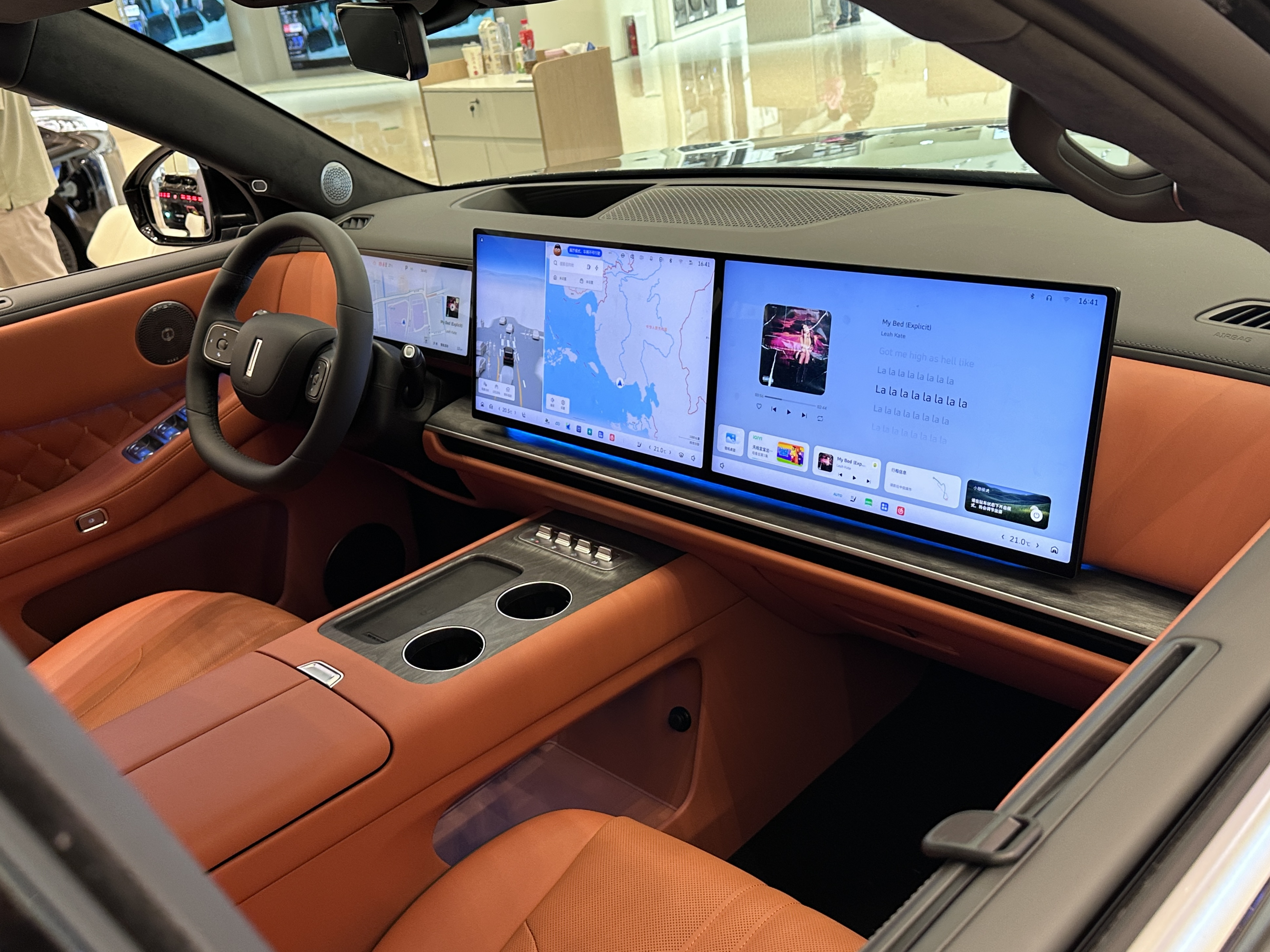
Interior

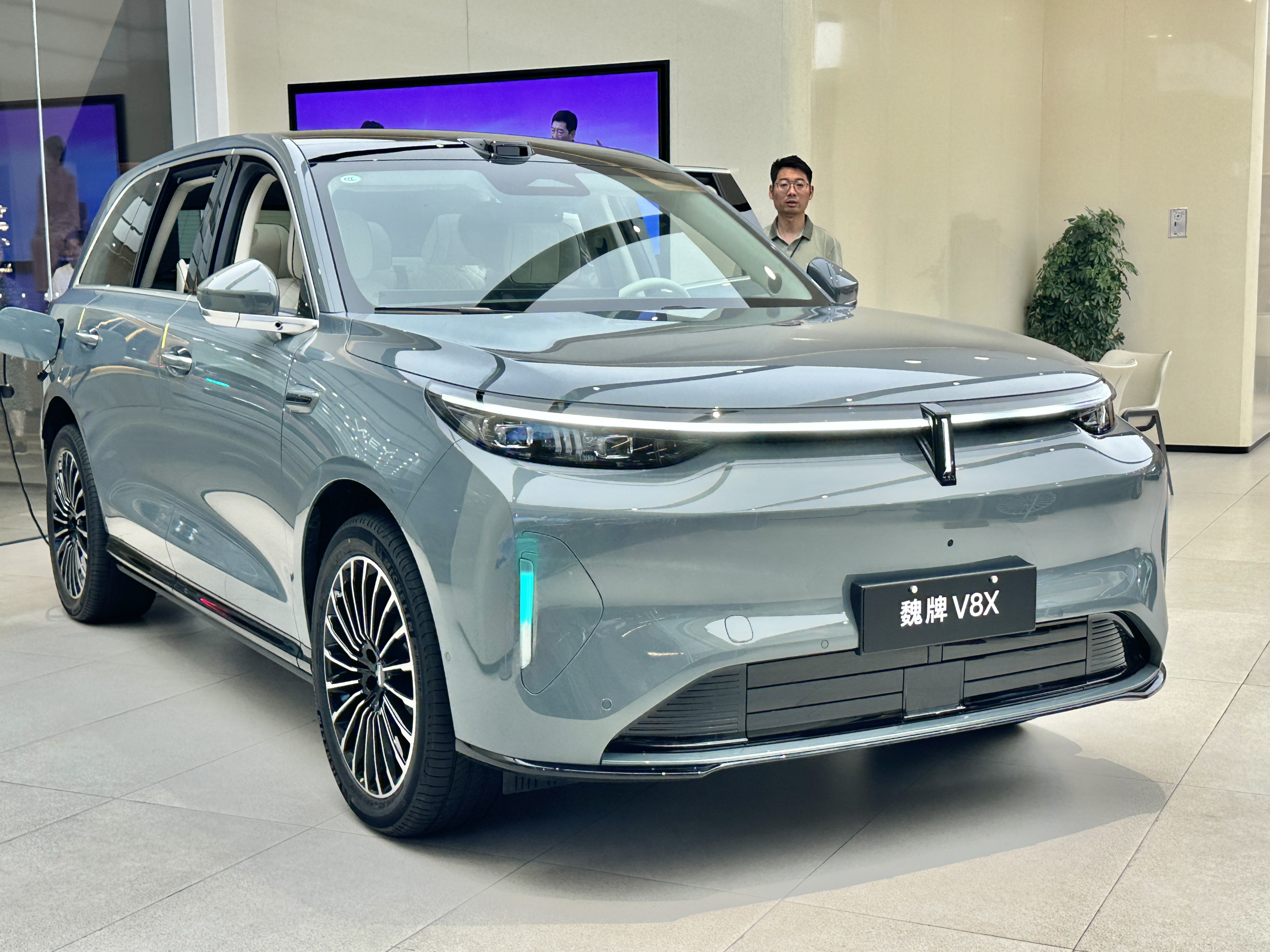
Wey V8X

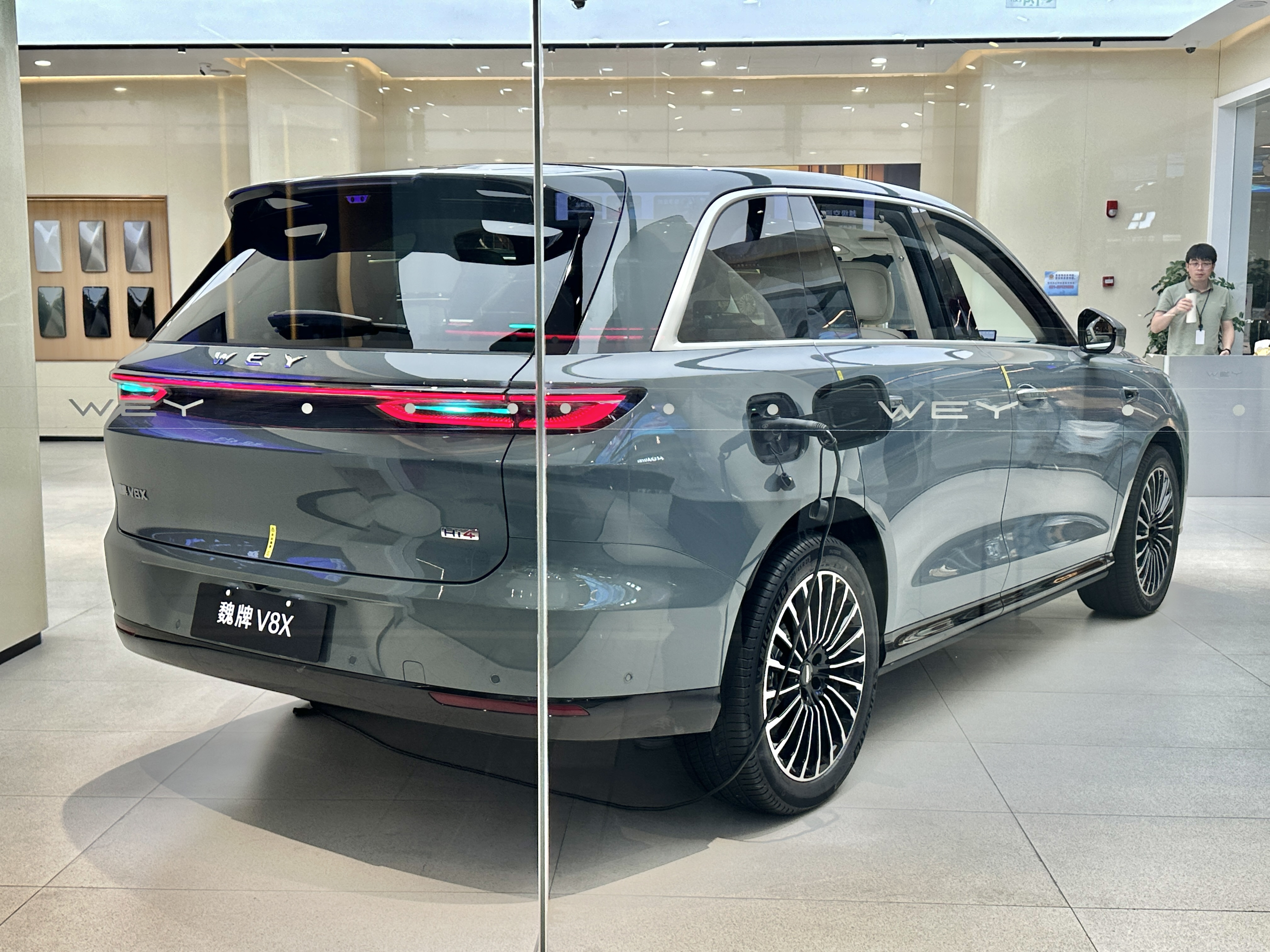
Rear view

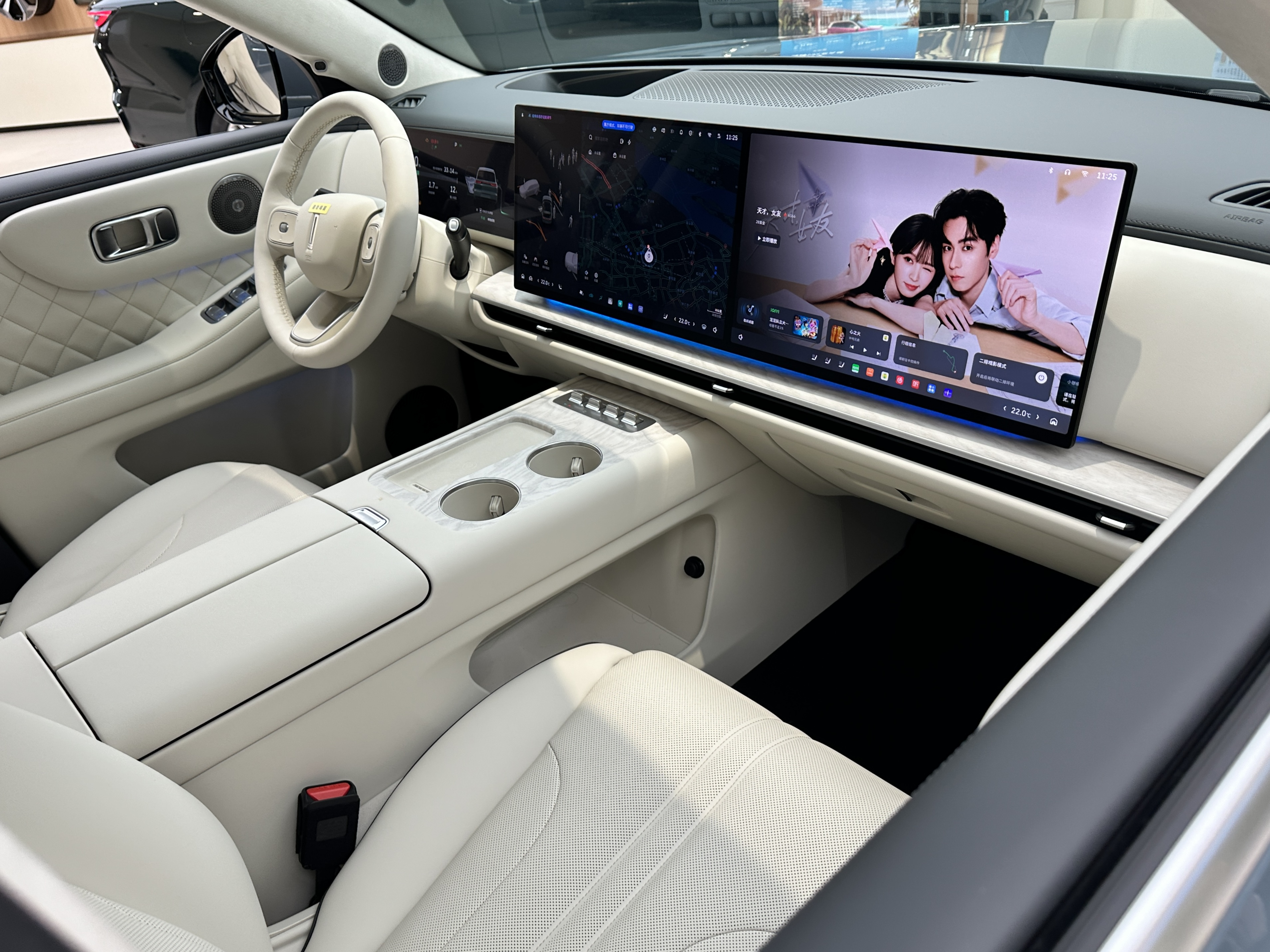
Interior

=== Features ===
The V9X is equipped with dual VLA models as well as a LiDAR sensor mounted on the roof and 27 additional sensors for the driving system. The V9X also utilizes four-wheel steering which allows the rear wheels to turn ±10°. Bionic motion controls are also anticipated for the V9X.

== Plagiarism controversy ==
The Great Wall Motor chairman Wei Jianjun issued a video apology on March 6, 2026, where he confirmed that a promotional poster for the V9X plagiarized Land Rover's Hidden Force campaign for the Range Rover Sport.

== Powertrain and chassis ==
The V9X uses GWM's Super Hi4 system consisting of a 2.0 liter turbocharged gasoline engine paired with two electric motors. Lower trims will receive a 56.3 kWh SVOLT nickel manganese cobalt battery weighing 288 kg (635 lb) while higher trims will receive a 77.7 kWh battery weighing 426 kg (939 lb) of the same chemistry also made by SVOLT. It uses a 4-speed dedicated hybrid transmission. Models using the 56.3 kWh battery get a range of 149 miles (240 km) while models using the 77.7 kWh battery get a range of 225.5 miles (363 km) with the acceleration time from 0–100 kilometres per hour (0–62 mph) being 4.4 with a full battery and 4.7 seconds with a depleted battery. The engine has an output of 235 horsepower. It is based on an 800-volt architecture.

== Suspension ==
The V9X uses front double wishbone suspension and a rear multilink axle with adjustable shock absorbers and dual-chamber air suspension.
