= Haval H4 =

Chinese crossover suv

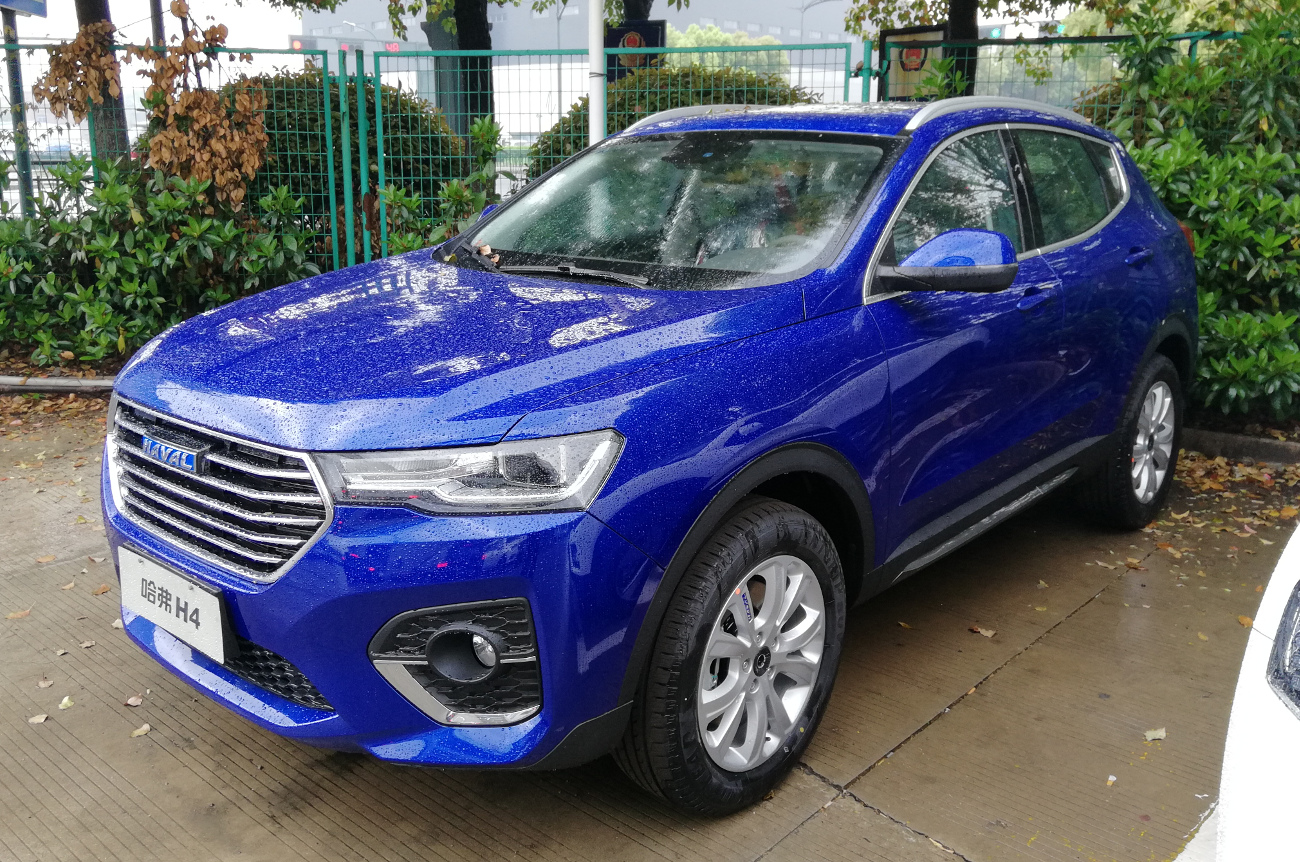

Overview
- Manufacturer: Great Wall Motor
- Production: 2017–2020
- Assembly: China: Tianjin (Great Wall Motor Co., Ltd. Tianjin Branch)

Body and chassis
- Class: Compact crossover SUV
- Body style: 5-door SUV
- Layout: Front-engine, front-wheel-drive
- Related: Haval H6; Haval F5

Powertrain
- Engine: 1.3 L GW4B13 I4 (turbo petrol); 1.5 L GW4B15 I4 (turbo petrol)
- Transmission: 6 speed manual 7-speed DCT

Dimensions
- Wheelbase: 2,660 mm (104.7 in)
- Length: 4,410 mm (173.6 in) (Blue Label); 4,420 mm (174.0 in) (Red Label)
- Width: 1,845 mm (72.6 in)
- Height: 1,695 mm (66.7 in)

Chronology
- Successor: Haval Jolion

The Haval H4 is a compact crossover SUV produced by Great Wall Motor under the Haval marque from 2017 to 2020.

== Overview ==
Debuting on the 2017 Guangzhou Auto Show, the Haval H4 was positioned between the Haval H2 subcompact crossover and the slightly larger Haval H6 compact crossover.

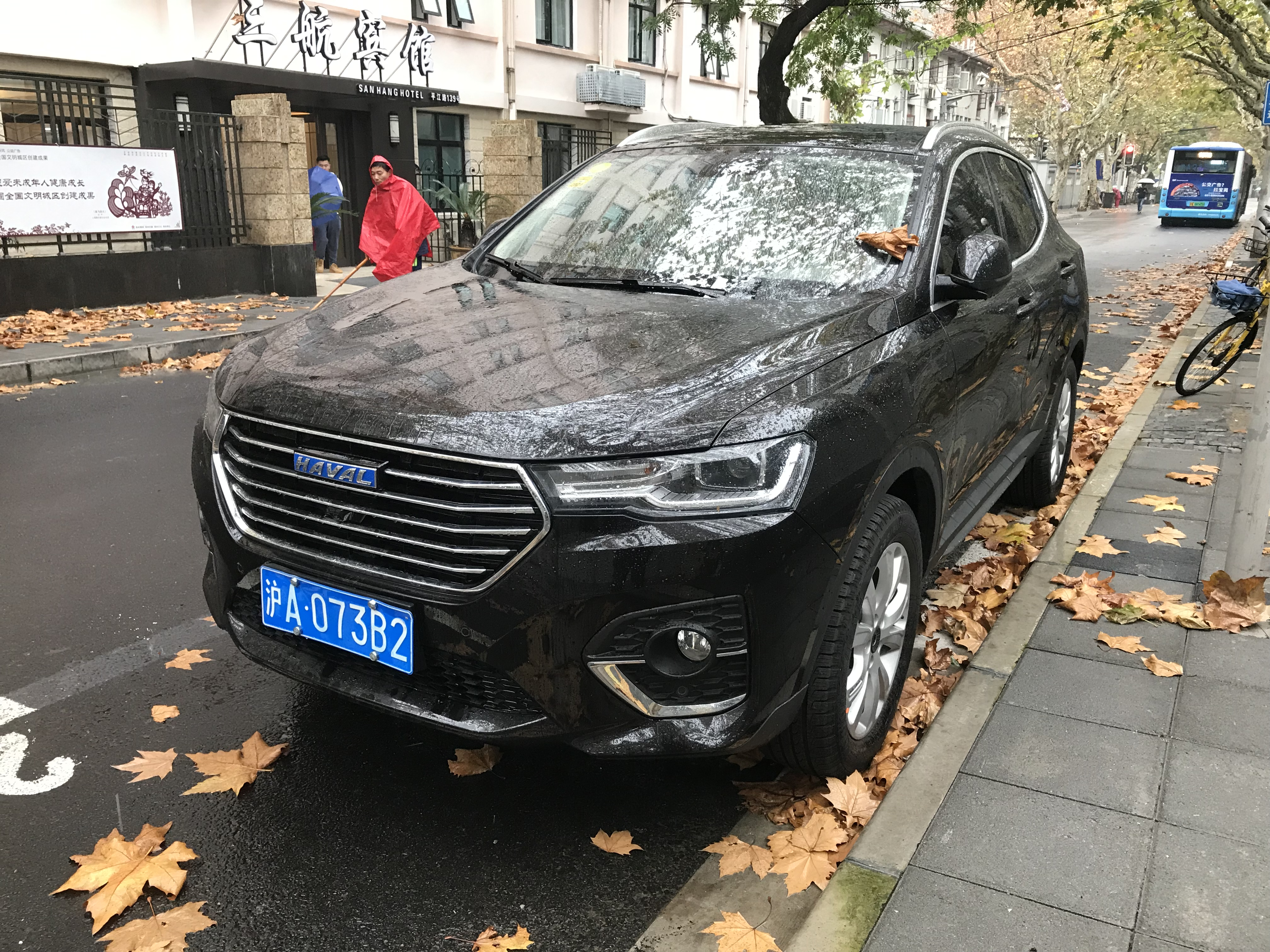
Havel H4 front.

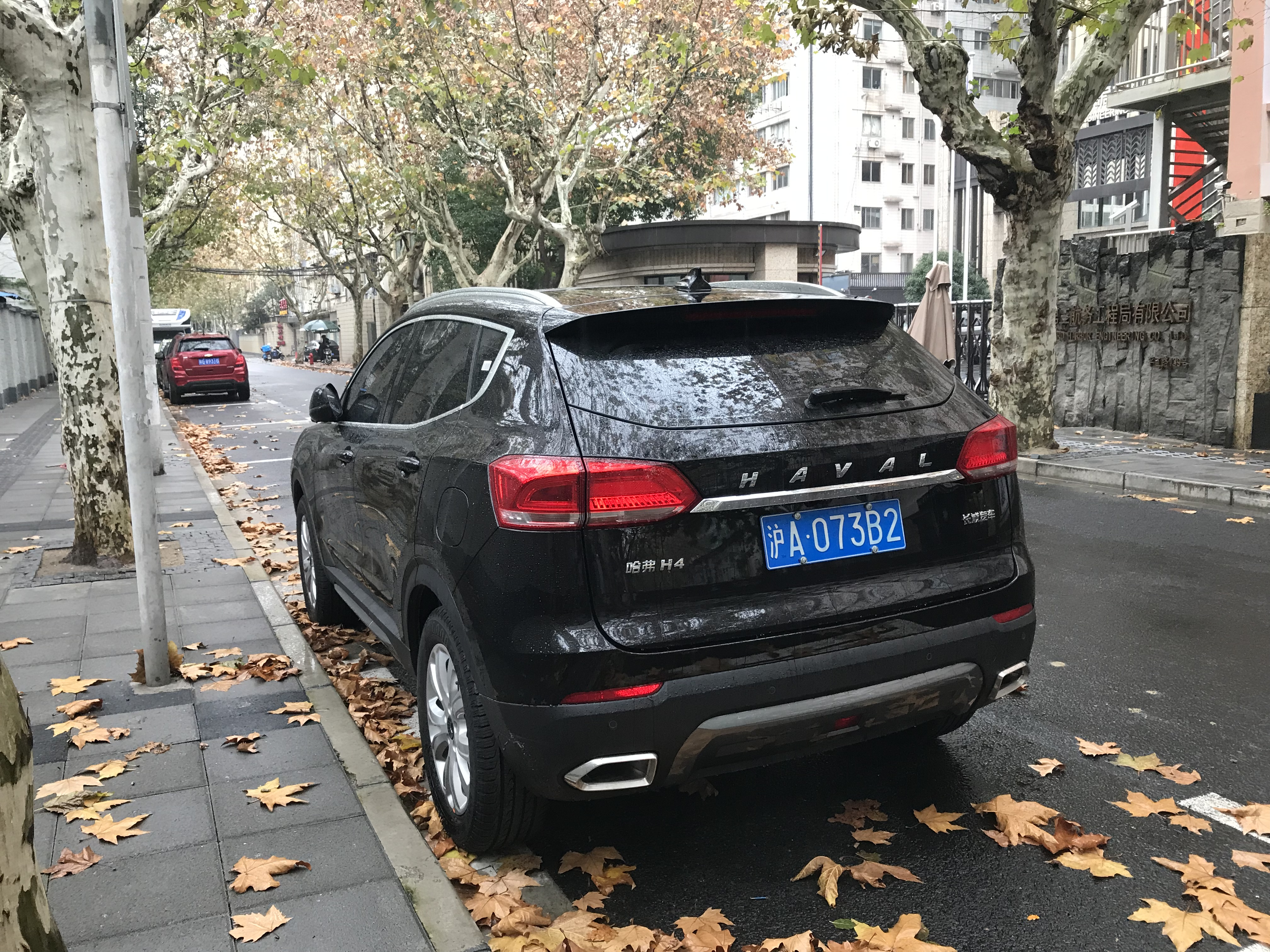
Havel H4 rear.

=== Powertrain ===
Power of the Haval H4 is provided two small four-cylinder engines. The engine options are a 1.3-liter producing 102 kW (137 hp) and 225 N⋅m (166 lb⋅ft) of torque and a 1.5-liter turbocharged petrol engine producing 124 kW (166 hp) and 285 N⋅m (210 lb⋅ft).

=== Interior ===
The interior of the H4 features a 12-inch center display, and a large driver display behind the steering wheel. Safety equipment includes a 360-degree camera system, lane-departure warning, lane-change assist, tyre-pressure monitoring and parking sensors at the front and rear of the vehicle.
