= Haval H2s =

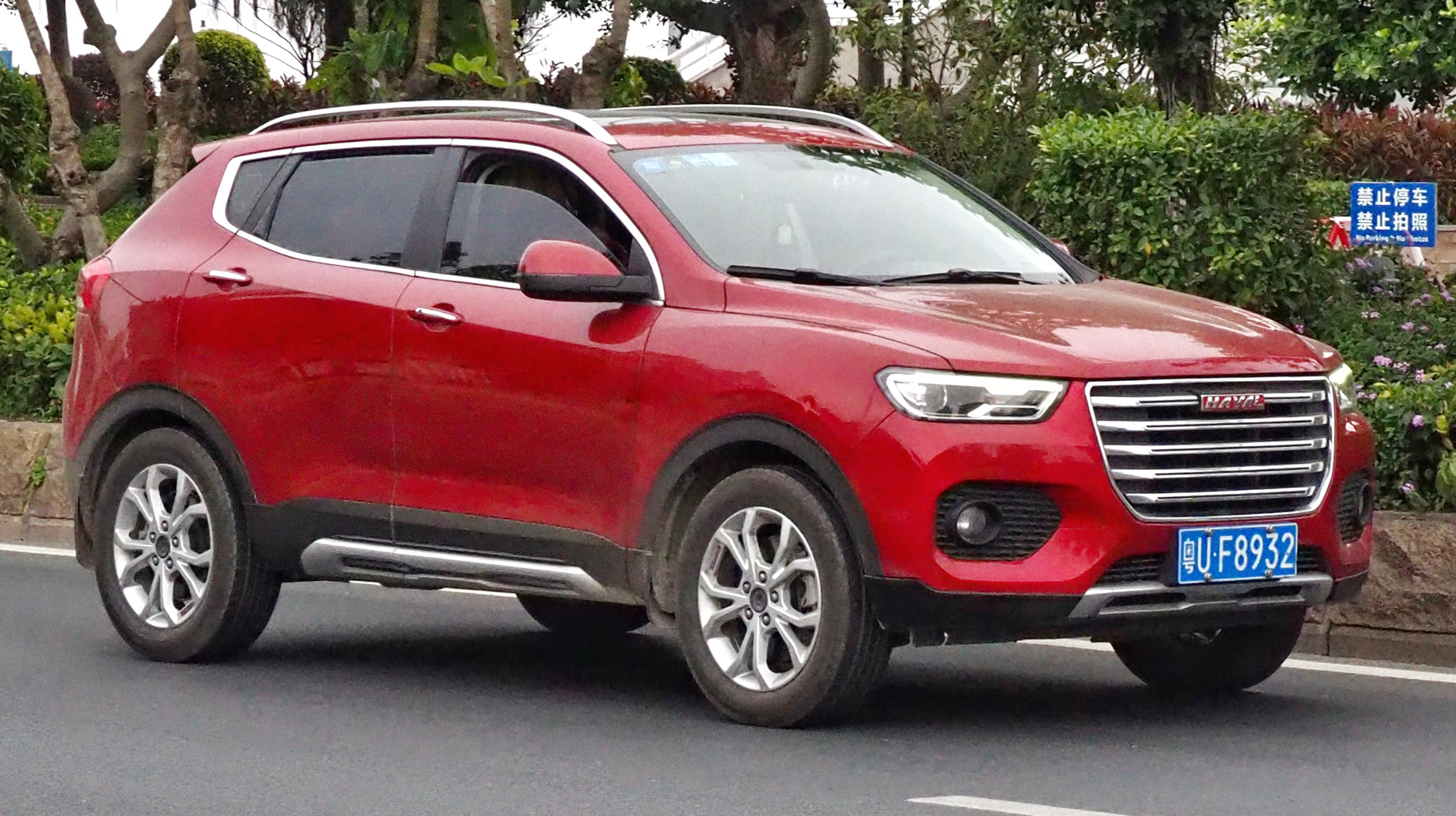

Overview
- Manufacturer: Great Wall Motor
- Production: 2016–2019

Body and chassis
- Class: Subcompact crossover SUV
- Body style: 5-door CUV

Powertrain
- Engine: 1.5 L 4G15 I4 (petrol)
- Transmission: 6 speed manual 7-speed DCT

Dimensions
- Wheelbase: 2,550 mm (100.4 in)
- Length: 4,195 mm (165.2 in) (Red Label); 4,174 mm (164.3 in) (Blue Label)
- Width: 1,772 mm (69.8 in) (Red Label); 1,617 mm (63.7 in) (Blue Label)
- Height: 1,695 mm (66.7 in)

Chronology
- Successor: Haval Jolion

The Haval H2s is a subcompact crossover SUV produced by the Haval sub-brand of Chinese manufacturer Great Wall.

== Overview ==
The Haval H2s is positioned slightly above the subcompact Haval H2 with a more modern design similar to the second generation Haval H6. Just like the other crossover products of Haval at the time, the model is available in two variations called the Red Label and Blue Label models. The variations features different styling in the front and rear end of the vehicle to target different target consumer groups.

The Haval H2s is powered by the same 1.5-litre turbocharged four-cylinder petrol engine as the H2, and produces 110 kW (148 hp) of power and 210 N⋅m (155 lb⋅ft) of torque. Gearbox is a seven-speed dual-clutch transmission supplied by Getrag.

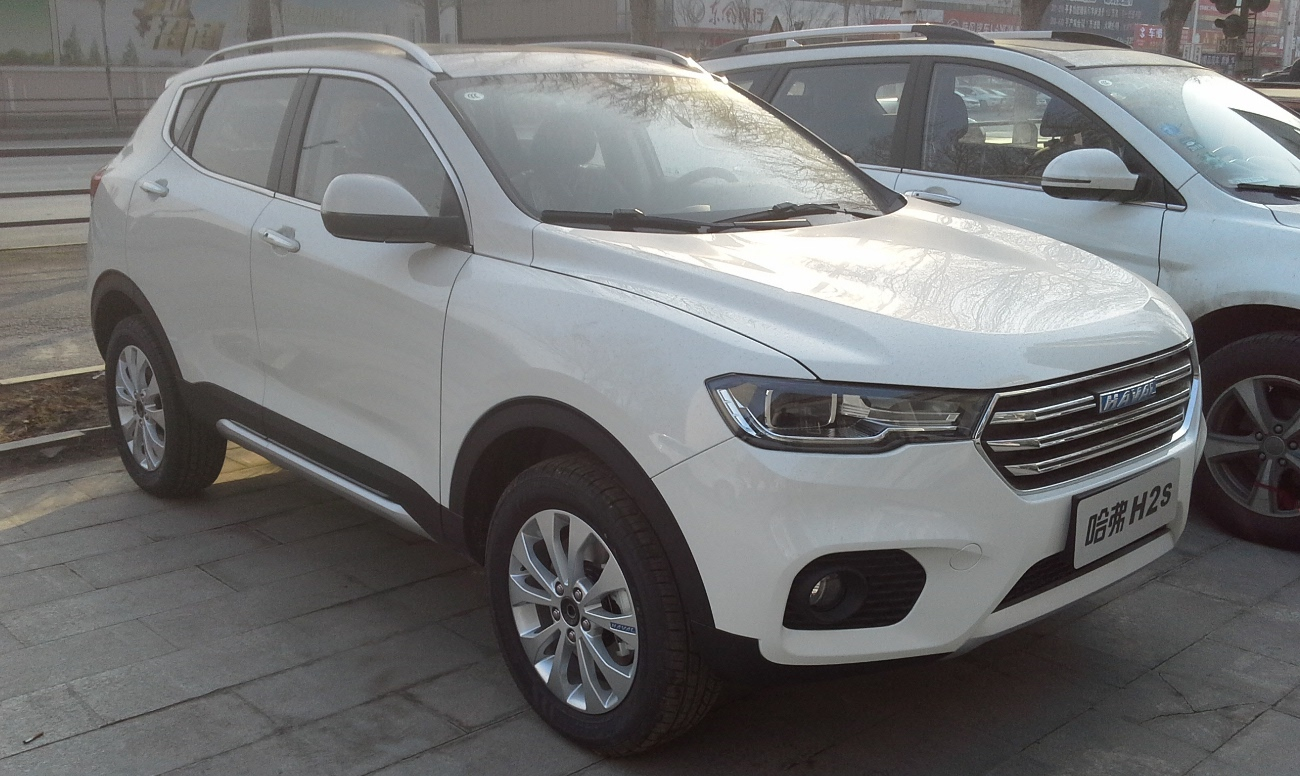
Haval H2s Blue Label front.

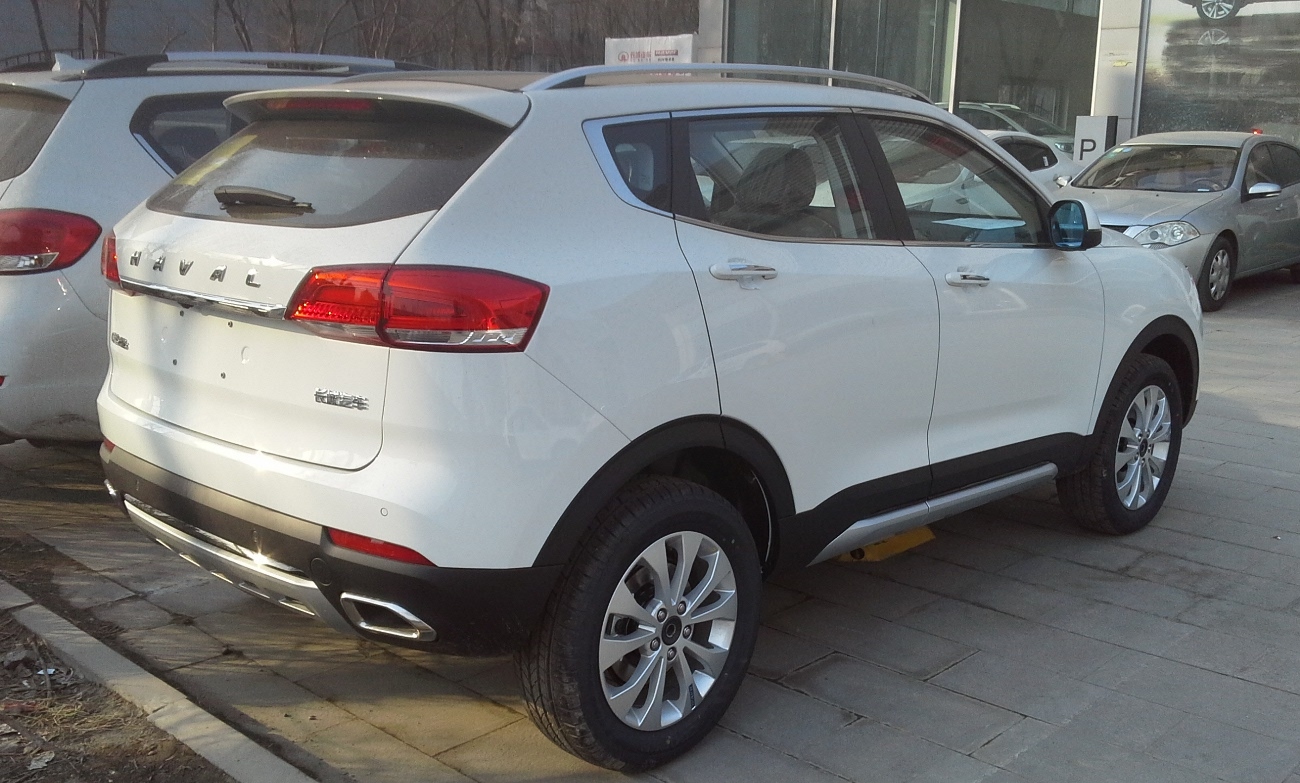
Haval H2s Blue Label rear.
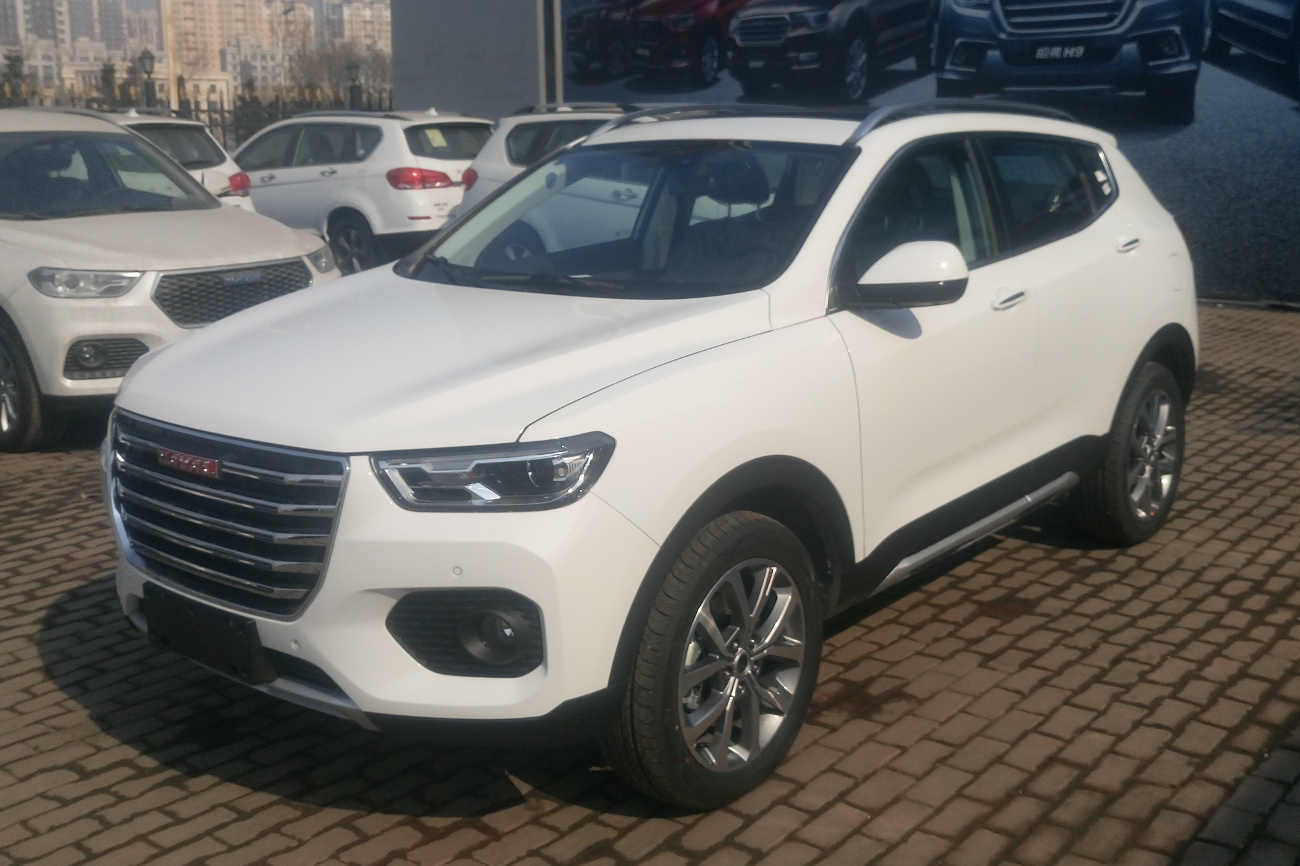
Haval H2s Red Label front.

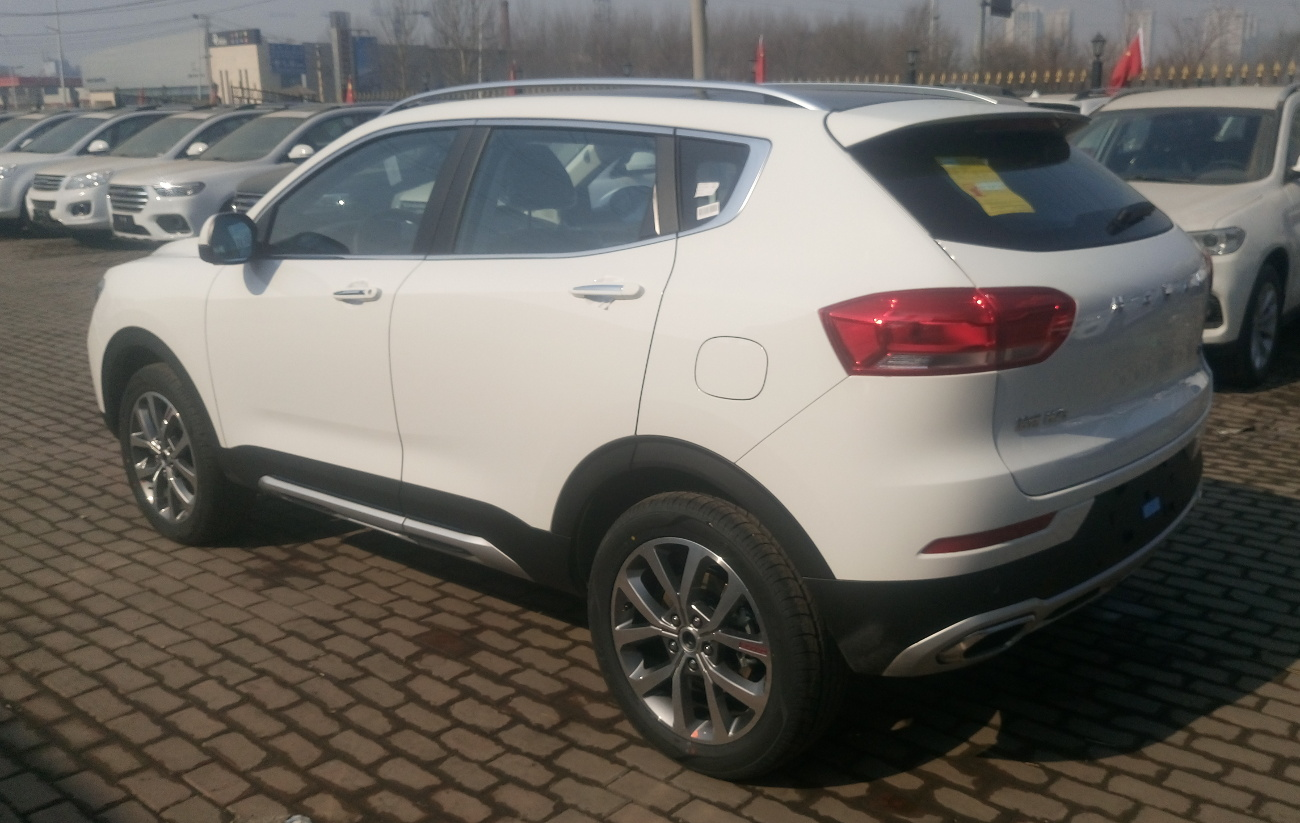
Haval H2s Red Label rear.

=== 2018 facelift ===
The Haval H2s was facelifted in 2018 and the two variant policy was dropped with only the previous Red Label model was carried over with the updated Black Label Haval logo. The post-facelift model sports a new grille but was discontinued a year later.

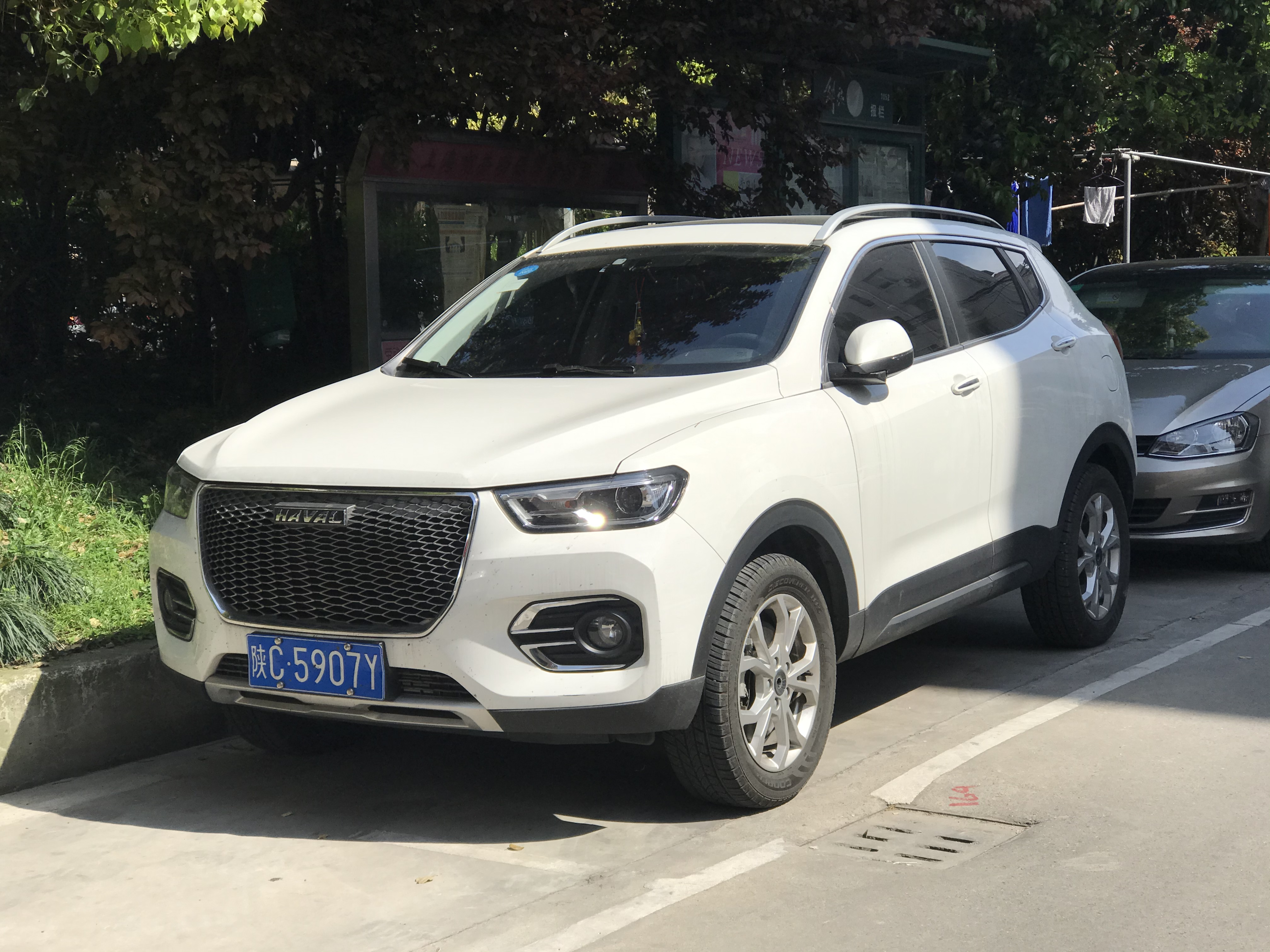
Haval H2s 2018MY.

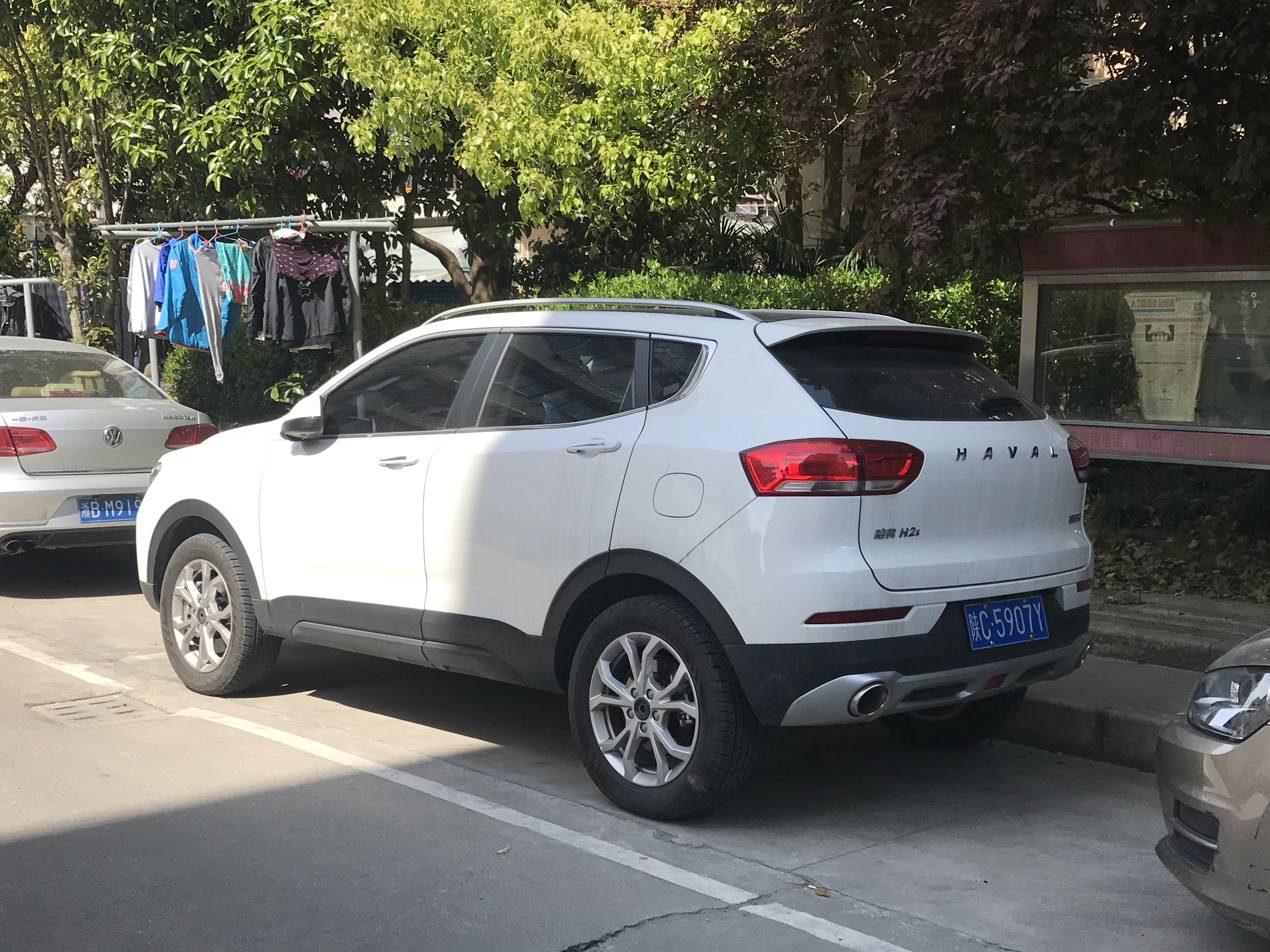
Haval H2s 2018MY.
