= Haval H6 Coupe =

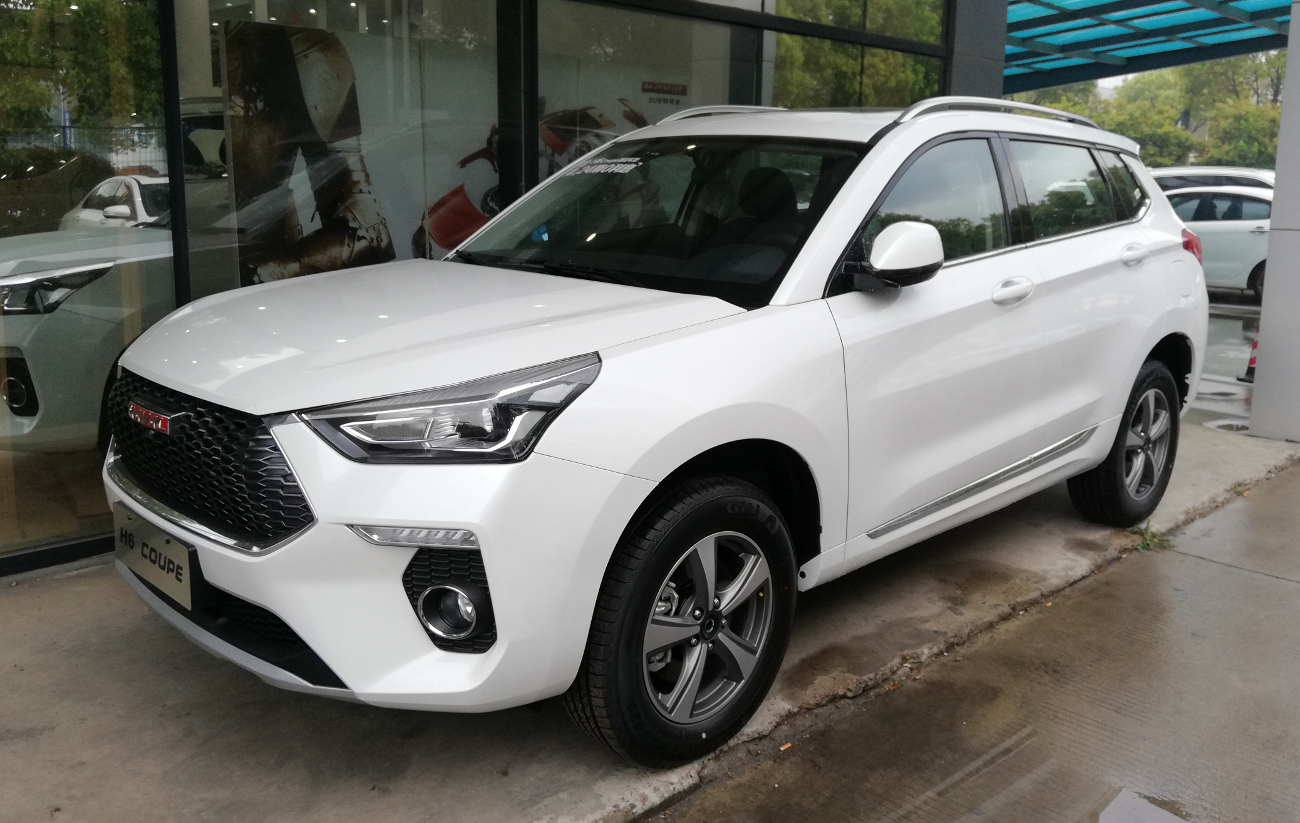
- Second generation Haval H6 Coupe (Haval H6 Coupe II)

Overview
- Manufacturer: Great Wall Motor
- Production: 2015–present

Body and chassis
- Class: Compact crossover SUV
- Body style: 5-door SUV
- Layout: Front-engine, front-wheel-drive Front-engine, four-wheel-drive

Chronology
- Predecessor: Haval H3

The Haval H6S or H6 Coupe (also referred to as H6 GT or H6 C) is a coupe compact SUV based on the Haval H6 compact SUV produced by Haval of Great Wall Motor.

The first and second generation is named as H6 Coupe and is based on the first and second generation of Haval H6 respectively.

The third generation is based on the third generation Haval H6 but renamed to H6S/ H6 GT.

== First generation (2015–2018) ==
Haval H6 Coupe
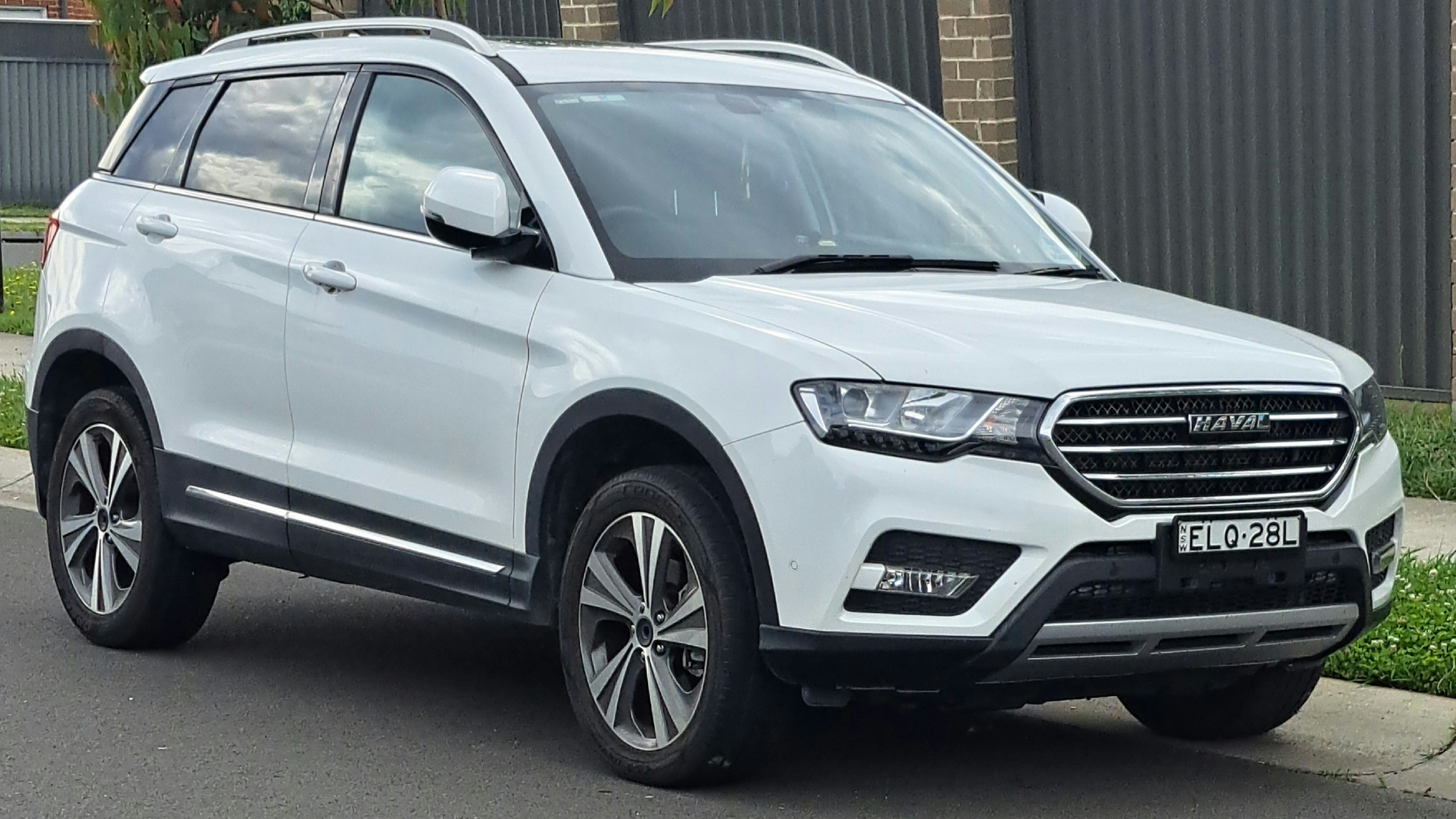
- Haval H6 Coupe Blue Label

Overview
- Manufacturer: Great Wall Motor
- Production: 2015–2018
- Assembly: Tianjin, China

Body and chassis
- Class: Compact SUV
- Body style: 5-door SUV
- Layout: Front-engine, front-wheel-drive or four-wheel-drive
- Related: Haval H6

Powertrain
- Engine: 2.0 L GW4G15B I4
- Transmission: 6 speed manual 6 speed DCT

Dimensions
- Wheelbase: 2,470 mm (97.2 in)
- Length: 4,545 mm (178.9 in)
- Width: 1,835 mm (72.2 in)
- Height: 1,700 mm (66.9 in)

Unveiled at the 2015 Shanghai Auto Show, the Haval H6 coupe is the production version of the previously launched Haval Coupe C concept which debuted at the 2014 Beijing Auto Show. Despite the slightly smaller dimensions compared to the regular Haval H6, it was positioned slightly higher in the market.

The only engine option available for the Haval H6 Coupe was the 2.0 liter turbocharged inline-four engine with an output of 140 kW (188 hp) and 310 N⋅m (229 lb⋅ft), mated to a six-speed dual-clutch transmission (DCT).

As of 2017, a Red Label and a Blue Label version featuring slightly different exterior styling were available targeted towards different client groups, with the Red Label Haval H6 coupe receiving redesigned front and rear fascias and the Blue label model largely remaining the same as the 2015 model.

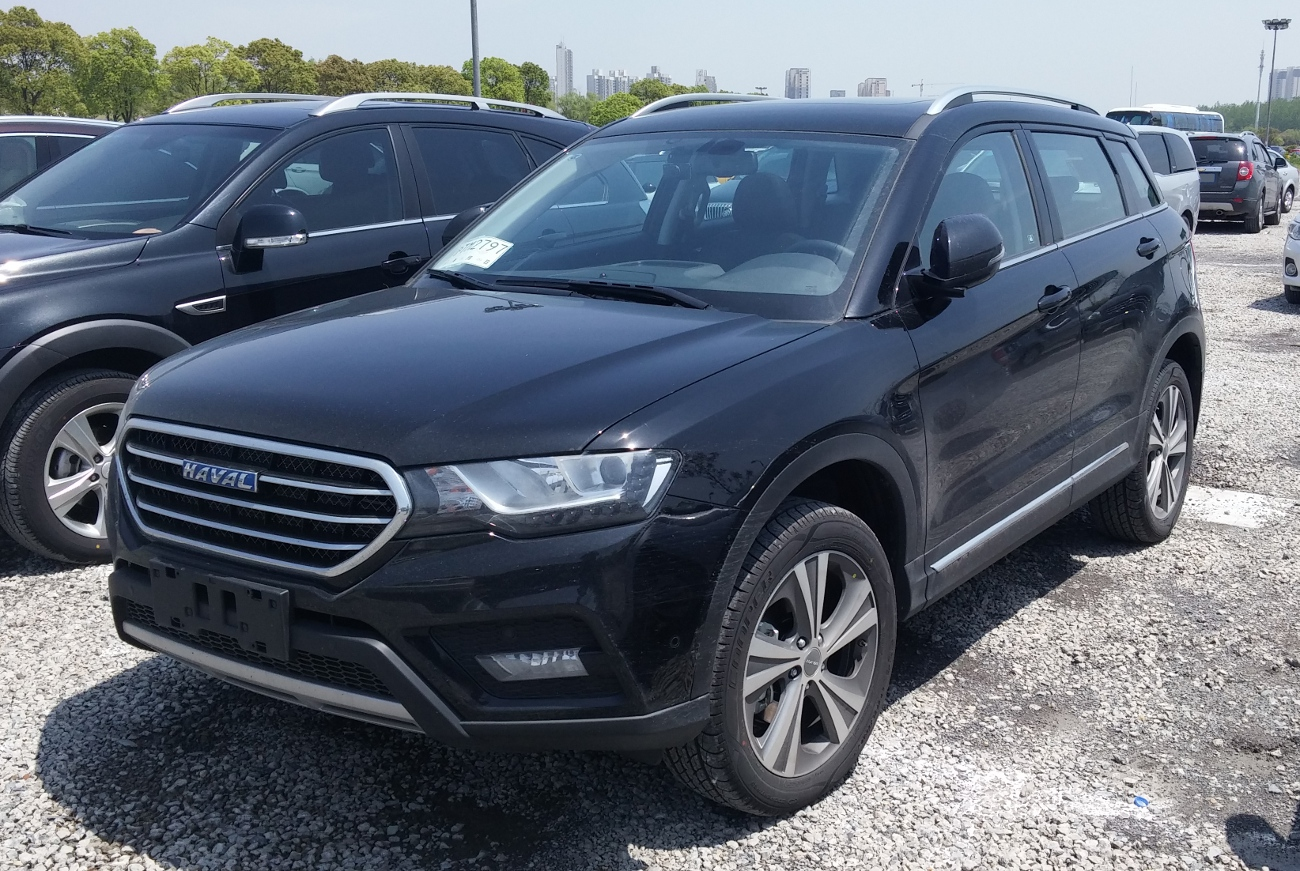
2016 Haval H6 Coupe Blue Label (front)

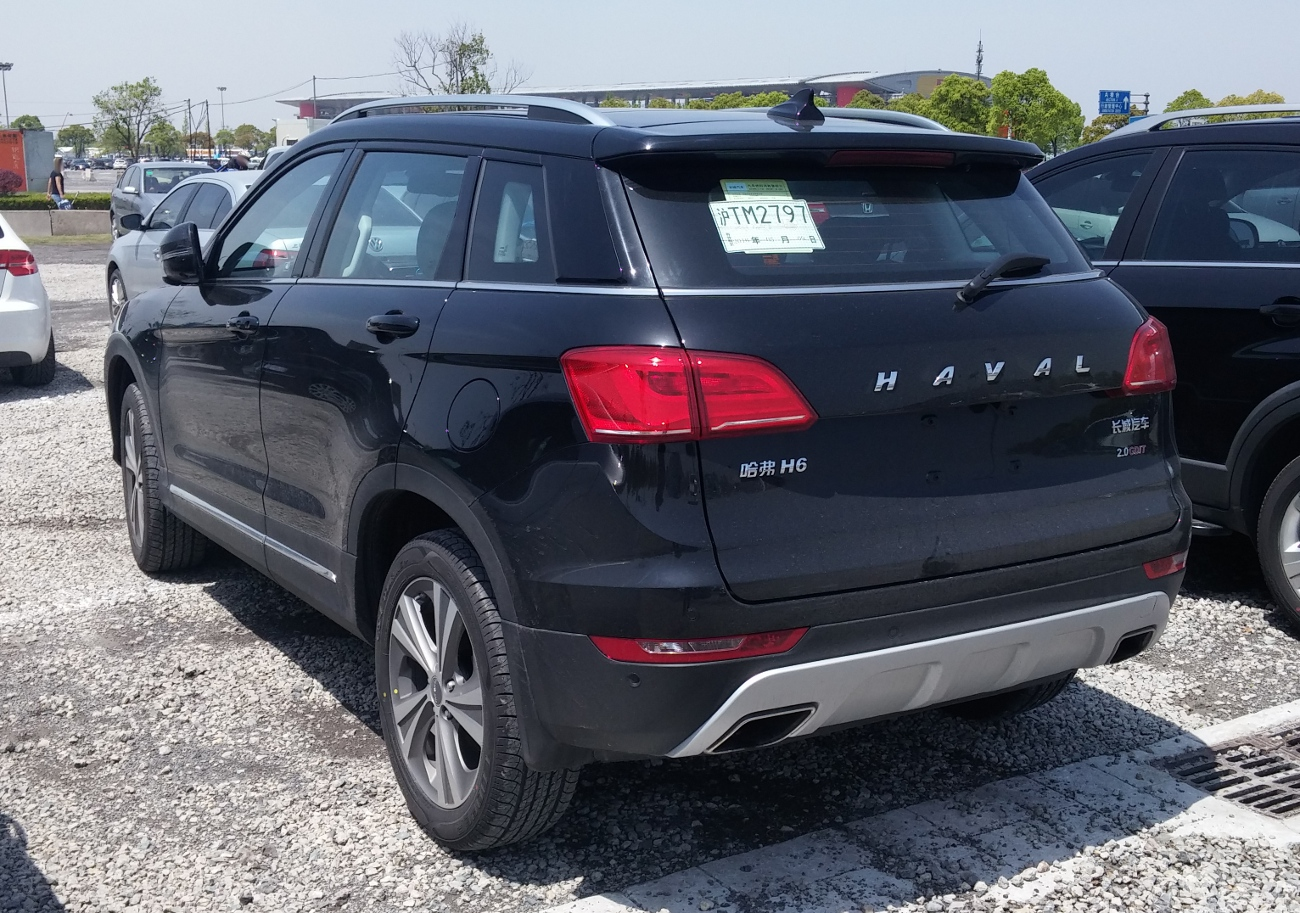
2016 Haval H6 Coupe Blue Label (back)

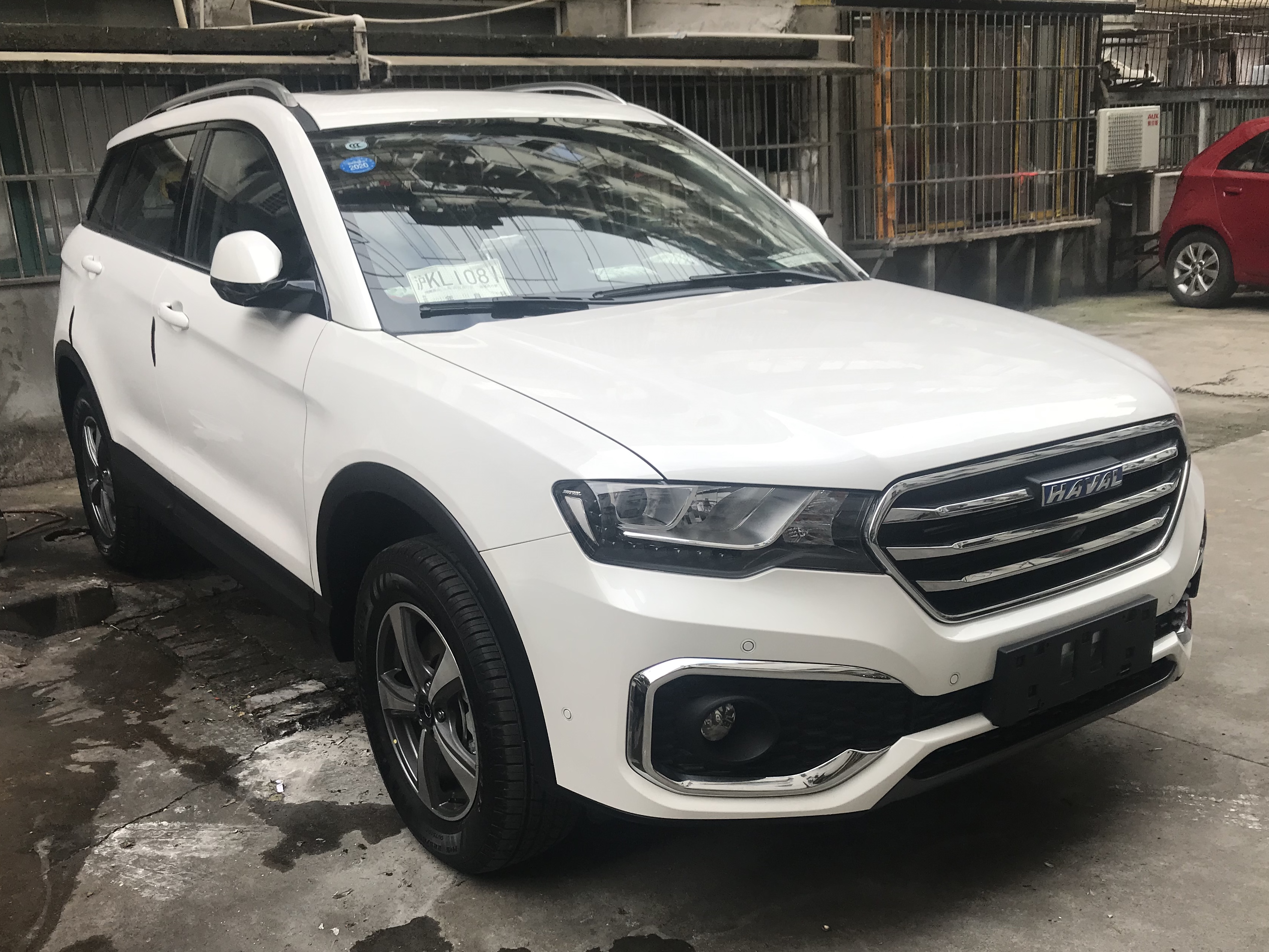
2018 Haval H6 Coupe Blue Label facelift (front)
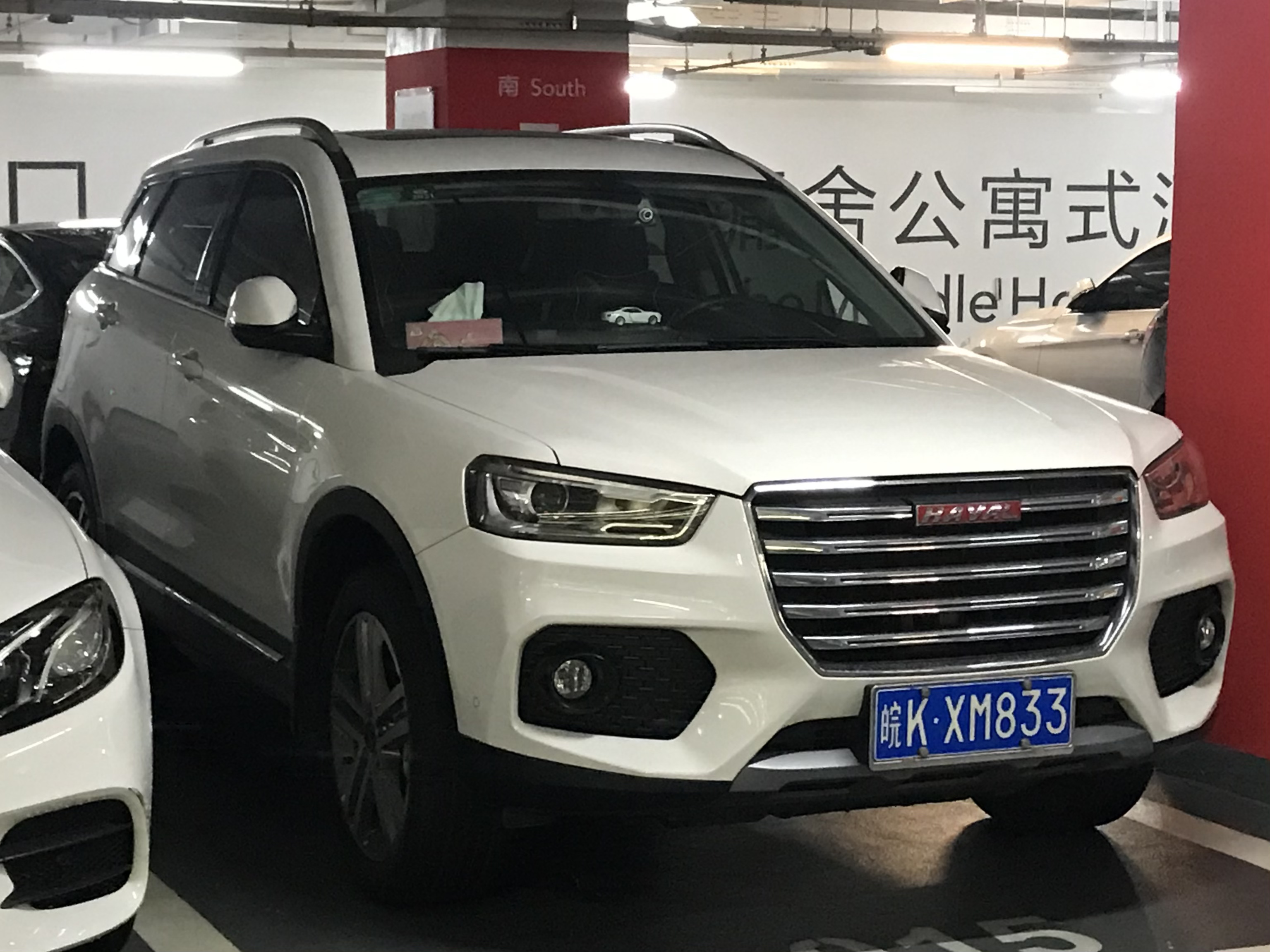
Haval H6 Coupe Red Label (front)

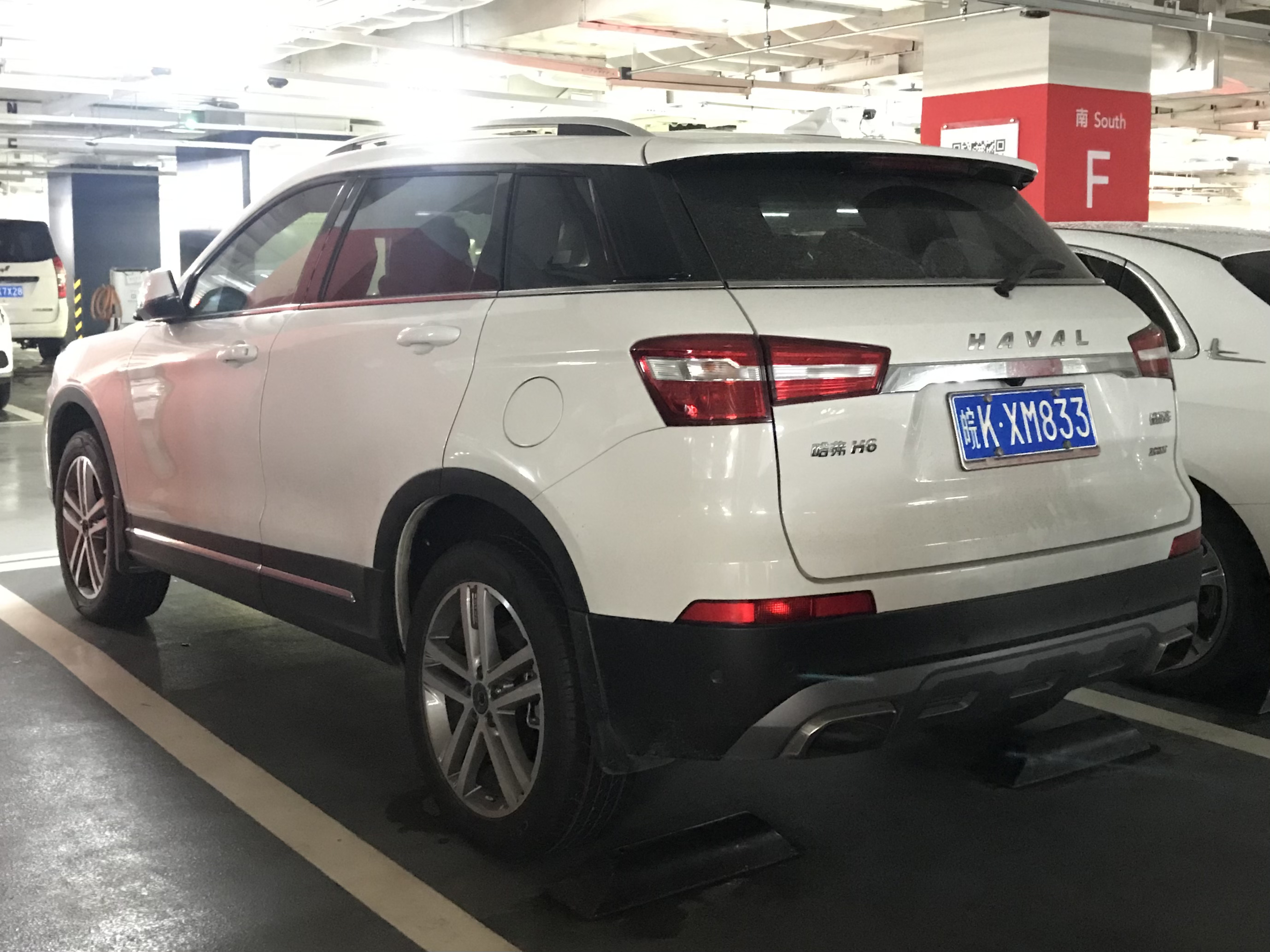
Haval H6 Coupe Red Label (back)

== Second generation (2017–2021) ==
Haval H6 Coupe
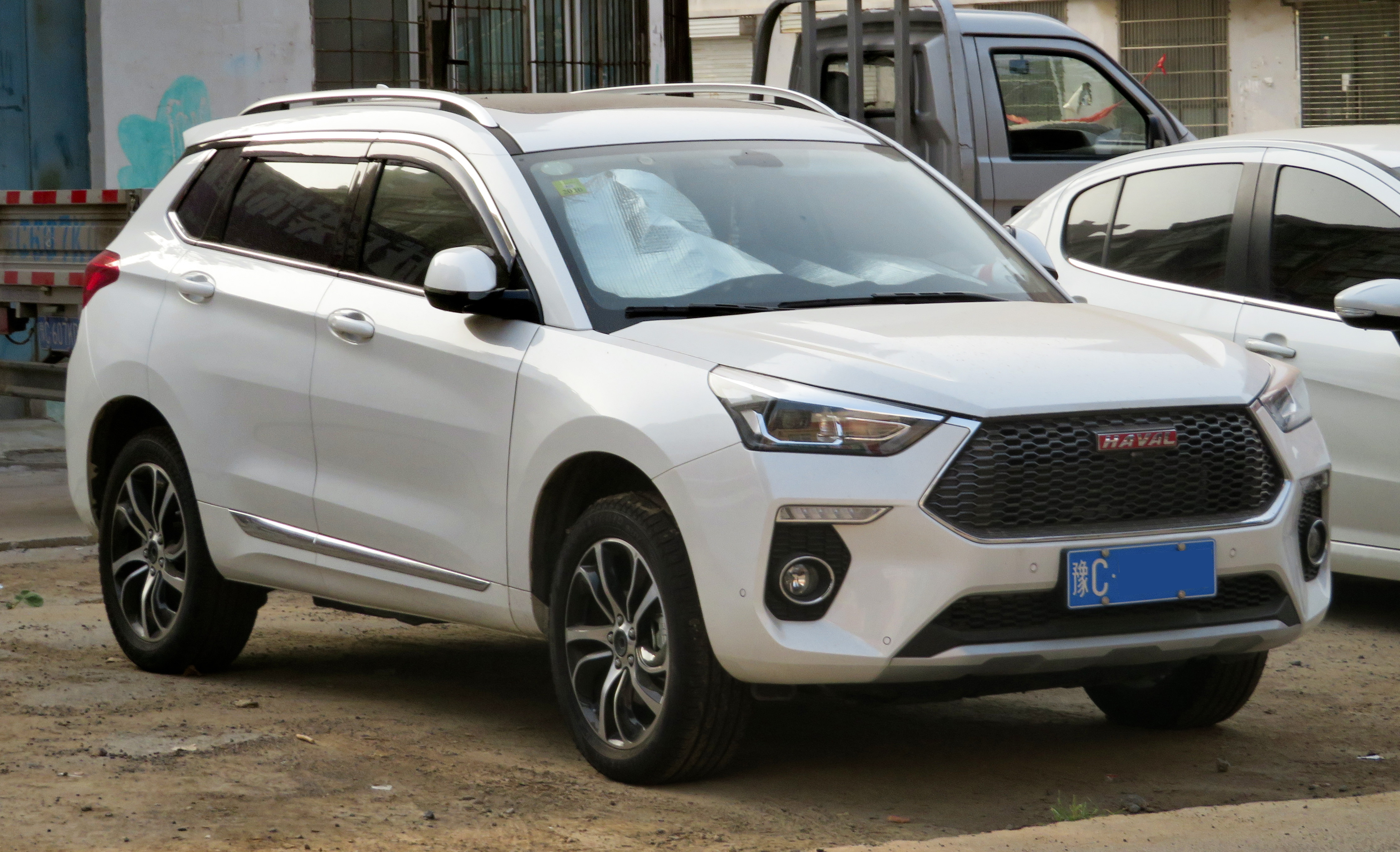
- 2018 Haval H6 Coupe II Red Label

Overview
- Manufacturer: Great Wall Motor
- Production: 2017–2021
- Assembly: Tianjin, China

Body and chassis
- Class: Compact SUV
- Body style: 5-door SUV
- Layout: Front-engine, front-wheel-drive
- Related: Haval H6

Powertrain
- Engine: 1.5 L 4G15 turbo I4 (petrol)
- Transmission: 6 speed manual 6 speed automatic 7 speed DCT

Dimensions
- Wheelbase: 2,720 mm (107.1 in)
- Length: 4,590 mm (180.7 in)
- Width: 1,845 mm (72.6 in)
- Height: 1,700 mm (66.9 in)

Chronology
- Successor: H6S/ H6 GT

A completely restyled Red Label version of the Haval H6 Coupe was introduced in 2018 with the whole vehicle redesigned, while selling alongside the original Haval H6 Coupe and making the original Haval H6 Coupe a Blue Label model.

As of February 2019, a facelift replaced the logo with the updated black label badge and ending the Blue Label model, formally making the previous Red Label version of the Haval H6 Coupe the second generation model. The updated model uses a 1.5 liter turbo inline-four engine producing 124 kW (169 PS) and 285 N⋅m (210 lb⋅ft) of torque.

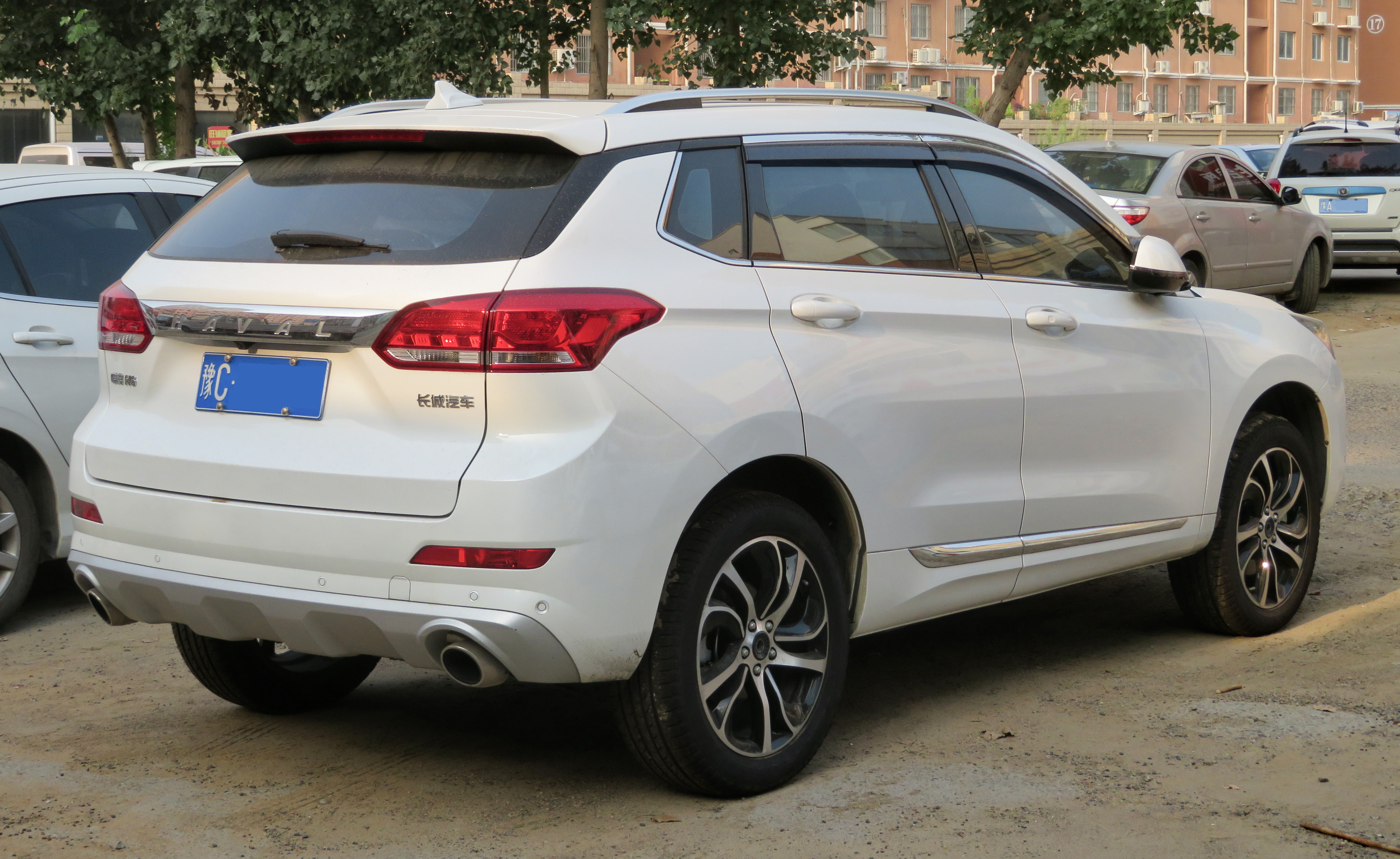
2018 Haval H6 Coupe Red Label (rear)

== Third generation (H6S/H6 GT; 2021–present) ==
Haval H6S / GT
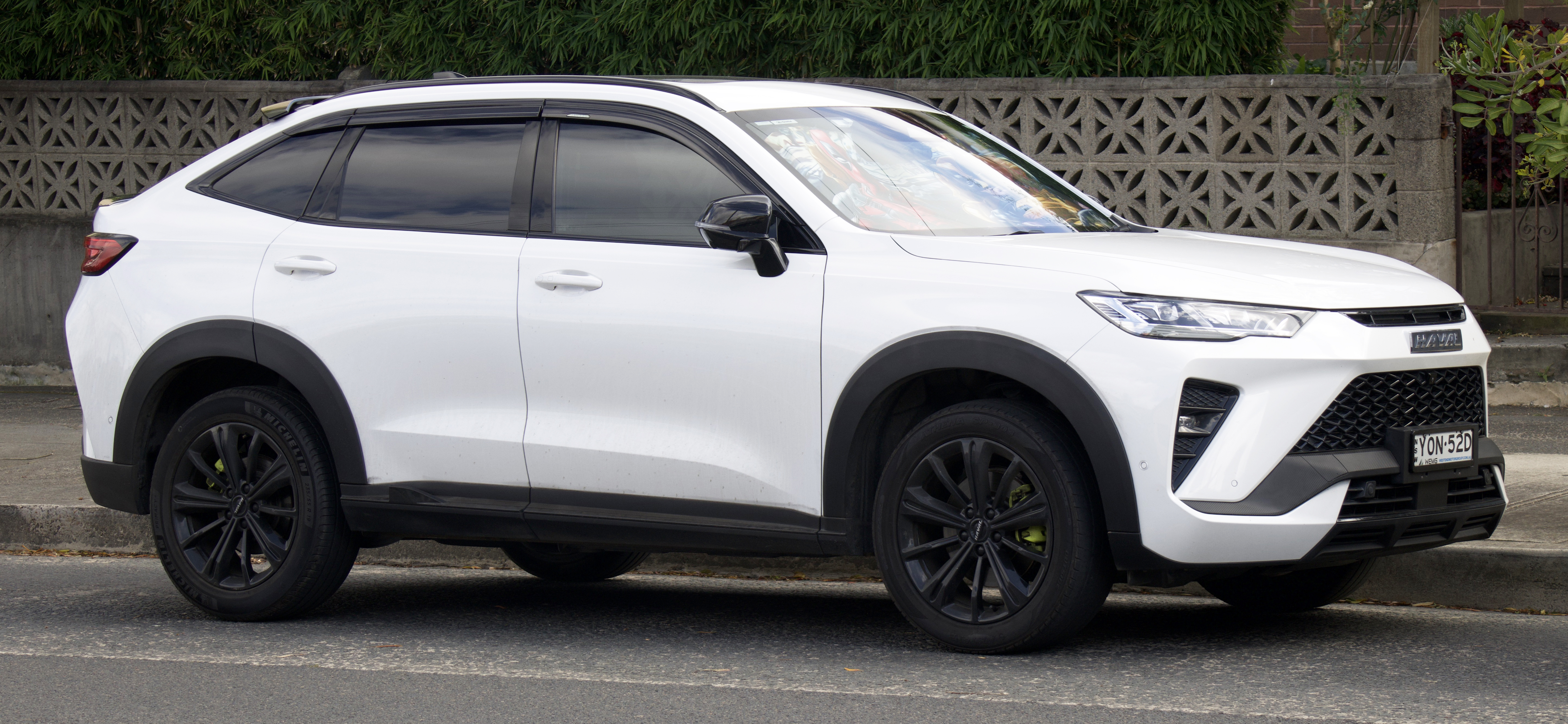

Overview
- Manufacturer: Great Wall Motor
- Production: 2021–2024 (China); 2023–present (export)
- Assembly: Tianjin, China

Body and chassis
- Class: Compact SUV
- Body style: 5-door coupe SUV
- Layout: Front-engine, front-wheel-drive
- Related: Haval H6

Powertrain
- Engine: petrol: 1.5 L GW4B15D turbo I4 (Hybrid); 2.0 L GW4N20 turbo I4
- Transmission: 7 speed DCT (Petrol); 3 speed DHT (Hybrid)

Dimensions
- Wheelbase: 2,738 mm (107.8 in)
- Length: 4,727 mm (186.1 in)
- Width: 1,940 mm (76.4 in)
- Height: 1,729 mm (68.1 in)

Chronology
- Predecessor: Haval H6 Coupe

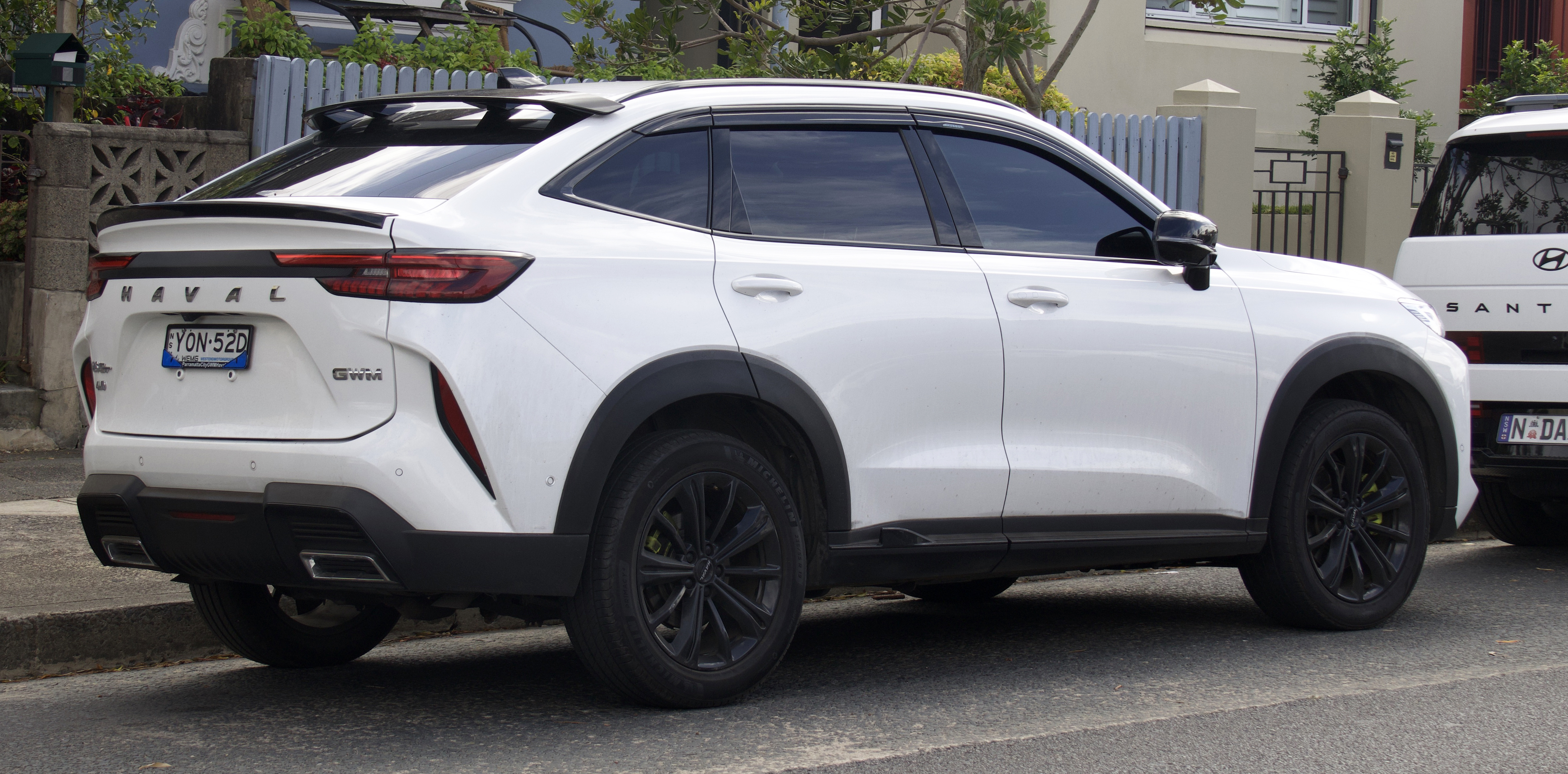
Haval H6 GT Ultra

The third generation coupé variant of H6 was renamed as H6S in Chinese market and H6 GT in export markets like Australia, New Zealand, South Africa, Brunei and Jamaica.

There are two engine options for the H6S in China, one of which is the 2.0-litre turbo four-cylinder engine, and the other is a hybrid powertrain that pairs a 1.5-litre turbo-petrol engine with a two-speed electric motor and a small 1.8 kWh battery pack that stores recycled braking energy. Total system power and torque outputs are rated at 179 kW (243 PS; 240 hp) and 530 N⋅m (391 lb⋅ft; 54 kg⋅m) Haval claims the powertrain to have a fuel consumption of 4.9 L/100 km (58 mpg_{‑imp}; 48 mpg_{‑US}) and the acceleration time from 0 to 100 km/h (0 to 62 mph) in 7.5 seconds.

== Sales ==
Year	China
2023	1,667
2024	91
