= Jetour X70L =

Mid-size crossover SUVs

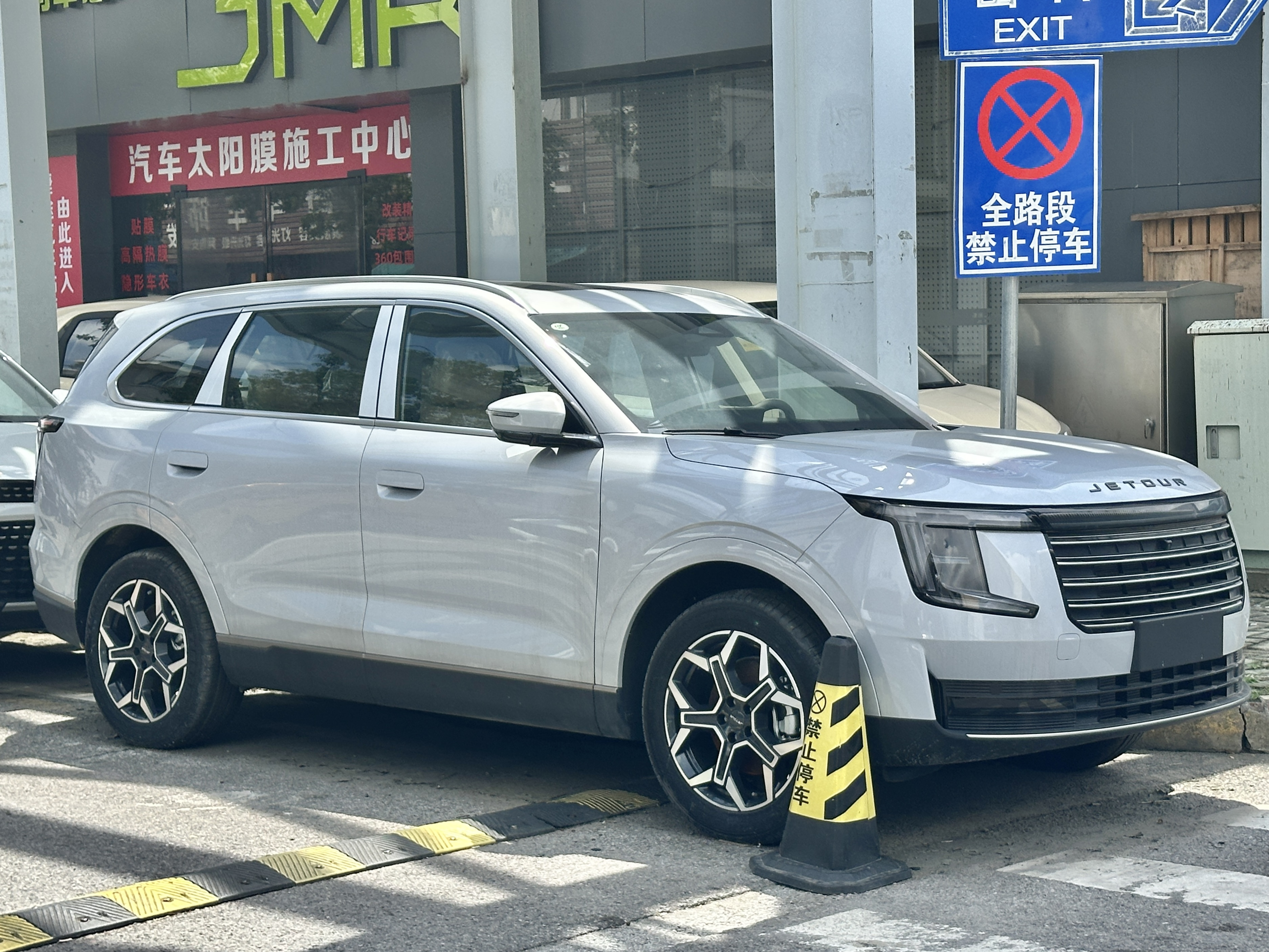

Overview
- Manufacturer: Jetour
- Also called: Soueast S08; Jetour S08 i-DM (Philippines)
- Production: 2025–present
- Assembly: China: Fuzhou, Fujian

Body and chassis
- Class: Mid-size crossover SUV
- Body style: 5-door SUV
- Layout: Front-engine, front-wheel-drive (X70L/S08); Front-engine, front-motor, front-wheel-drive (Shanhai L7 Plus/S08 DM)
- Related: Jetour X70; Jetour X90 II

Powertrain
- Engine: Petrol: 1.5 L turbo I4; 2.0 L turbo I4; Petrol plug-in hybrid: 1.5 L turbo I4
- Power output: 181–251 hp (135–187 kW; 184–254 PS) (X70L); 355 hp (265 kW; 360 PS) (Shanhai L7 Plus)
- Transmission: 8-speed automatic (X70L/S08); 2-speed Kunpeng DHT (Shanhai L7 Plus/S08 DM)
- Hybrid drivetrain: Plug-in hybrid
- Battery: 32.66 kWh LFP
- Range: 1,700 km (1,056 mi)
- Electric range: 167 km (104 mi)

Dimensions
- Wheelbase: 2,820 mm (111.0 in)
- Length: 4,810 mm (189.4 in)
- Width: 1,930 mm (76.0 in)
- Height: 1,705 mm (67.1 in)
- Curb weight: 1,654–1,727 kg (3,646–3,807 lb)

The Jetour X70L (Chinese: 捷途X70L; pinyin: Jié Tú X70L) and the Jetour Shanhai L7 Plus (Chinese: 捷途山海L7 Plus; pinyin: Jié Tú Shānhǎi L7 Plus; lit. 'Mountain Sea L7 Plus') are mid-size crossover SUVs produced by Chery under the Jetour brand. The X70L uses a petrol powertrain while the Shanhai L7 Plus uses a plug-in hybrid powertrain. In Kuwait, the X70L is known as the Soueast S08.

The X70L is intended to be a third generation of the X70. The L7 Plus is intended to be a second generation of the Jetour Shanhai L7.

== Overview ==
The Shanhai L7 Plus was unveiled at the 2025 Shanghai Auto Show.

The X70L and Shanhai L7 Plus are both mid-size SUVs and are larger than both the X70 and Shanhai L7. Both models are available in 5-seater and 7-seater configurations.

Pre-sales of the Shanhai L7 Plus began August 18, 2025. Sales commenced at the 2025 Chengdu Auto Show. The X70L's sales commenced on October 7, 2025.

=== Design and features ===
The X70L uses a chrome front grille, a full-width rear light bar, and Y-shaped headlights. The Shanhai L7 Plus also uses Y-shaped headlights in the front but does not feature the grille of the X70L. Both models use semi-hidden door handles.

The Formacar claims that the Shanhai L7 Plus uses a front end reminiscent of Kia's EV models.

The Shanhai L7 Plus features a 15.6-inch central touchscreen that can swivel 10 degrees left or right, a three-spoke steering wheel, the Tour OS 3.0 AI system which includes a large language model for voice commands, and a 12-speaker system that is expected to come with the L7 Plus.

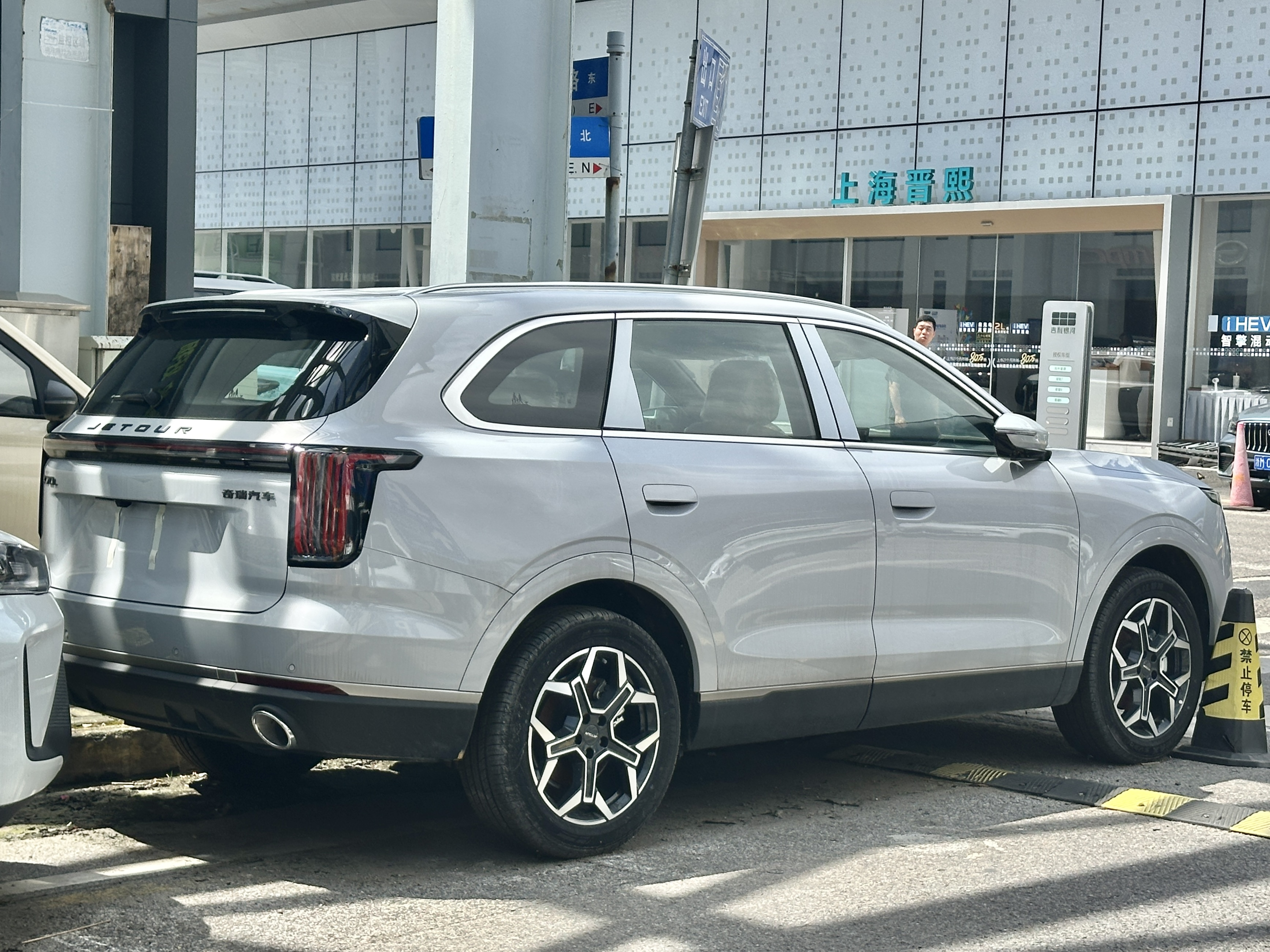
Rear view

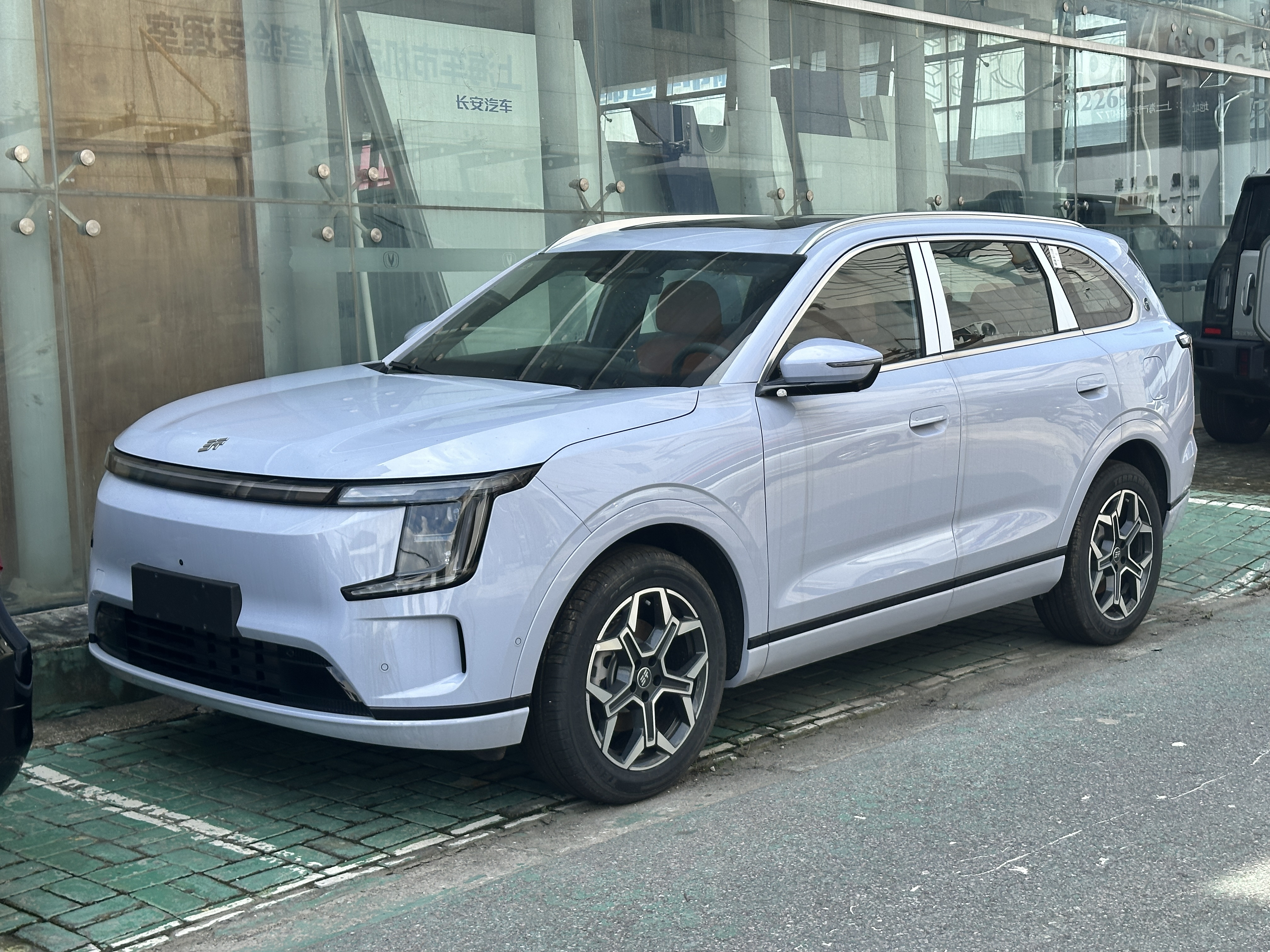
Jetour Shanhai L7 Plus

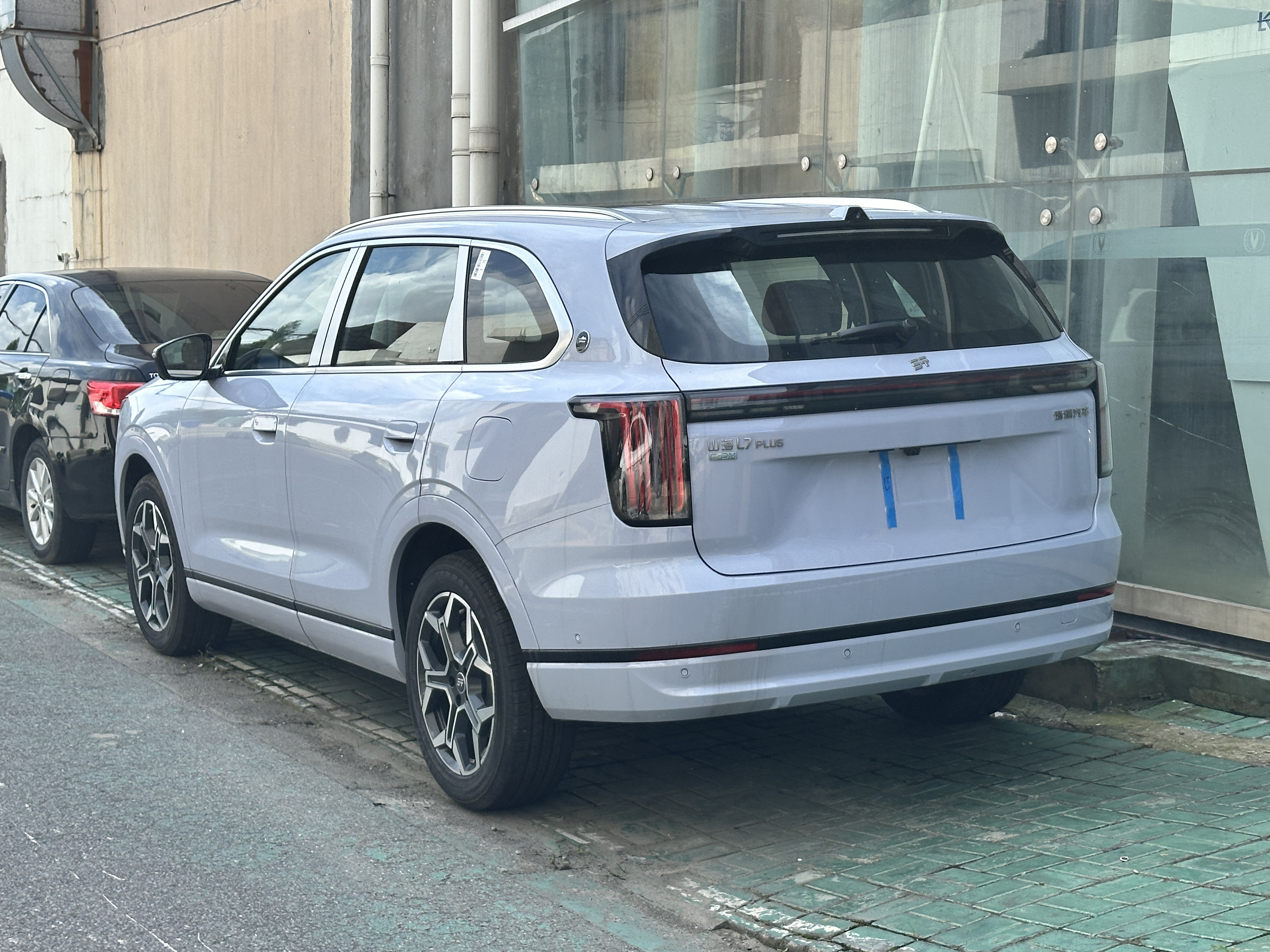
Rear view

Interior

== Powertrain ==
=== X70L ===
The X70L was available with a 1.5-liter turbocharged inline 4 producing 181 horsepower (135 kW; 184 PS) and also has a top speed of 180 kilometres per hour (112 mph). A 2.0-liter turbocharged inline 4 producing 251 horsepower (187 kW; 254 PS) is also available. Both engines use an 8-speed automatic transmission. The 2-liter engine is exclusive to the X70L.

=== Shanhai L7 Plus ===
The Shanhai L7 Plus also uses a 1.5-liter turbocharged inline-4, this time producing 154 horsepower (115 kW; 156 PS) with a total power output of 355 horsepower (265 kW; 360 PS) and 391 pound-feet (530 N⋅m) of torque. The Shanhai L7 Plus uses a 32.664 kWh lithium iron phosphate battery, although the manufacturer of the battery is yet to be revealed. The Shanhai L7 Plus has a CLTC all-electric range of 220 kilometres (137 mi) and a combined range of 1,500 kilometres (930 mi).

== Sales ==
Year	China	
Year	X70L	Shanhai L7 Plus
2025	6,929	19,650
