= Jetour X70 =

Mid-size crossover SUV

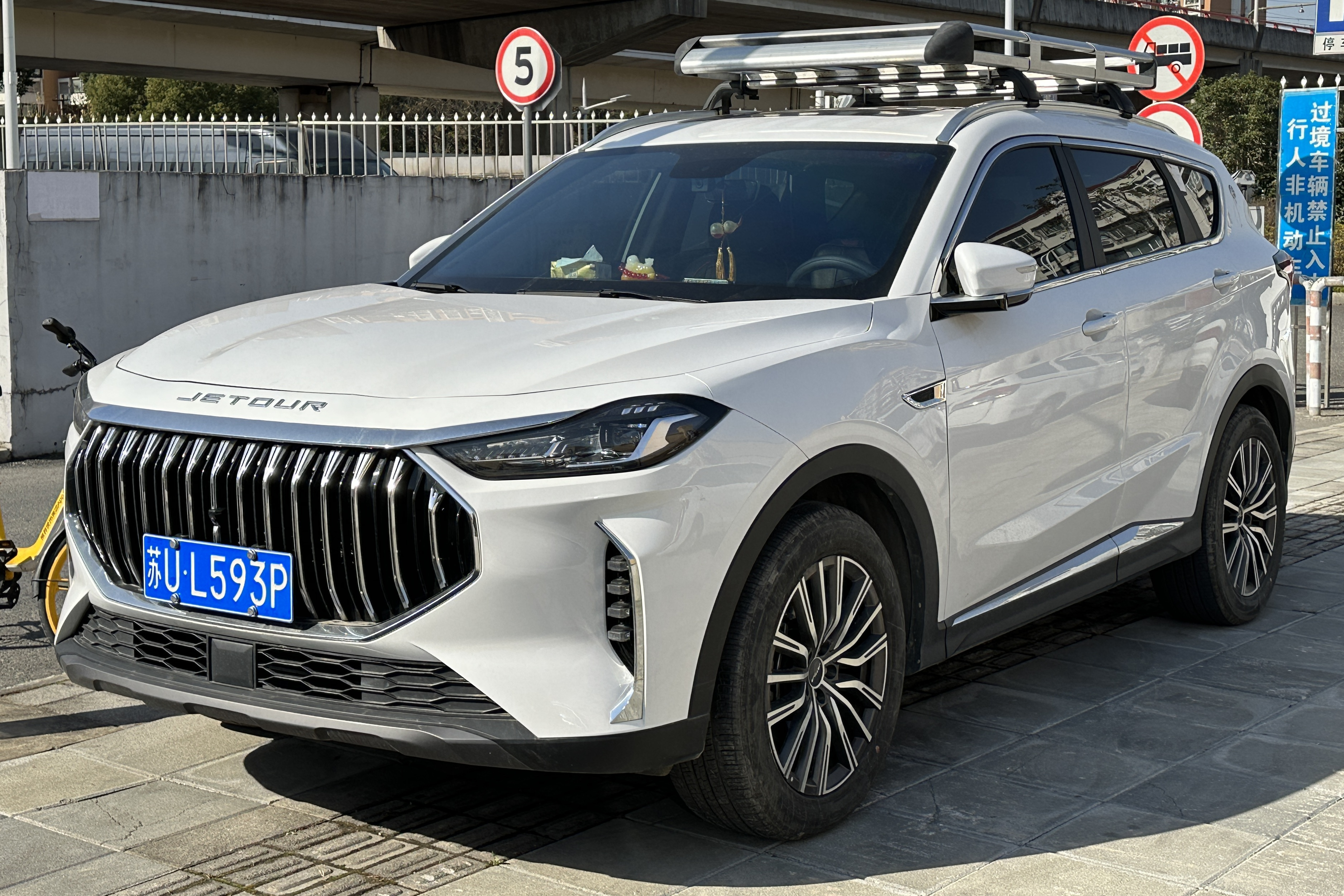
- Jetour X70 Plus

Overview
- Manufacturer: Jetour (Chery)
- Production: 2018–present
- Model years: 2018–present

Body and chassis
- Class: Mid-size crossover SUV
- Body style: 5-door SUV
- Layout: Front-engine, front-wheel-drive

Chronology
- Successor: Jetour X70L

The Jetour X70 is a mid-size crossover SUV produced by Jetour, a brand launched in 2018 by Chery.

There are several variants including the X70S, X70S EV, X70 Coupe, X70M, and the range topping X70 Plus model that serves as a more upmarket model.

== Jetour X70 (2018) ==
Jetour X70
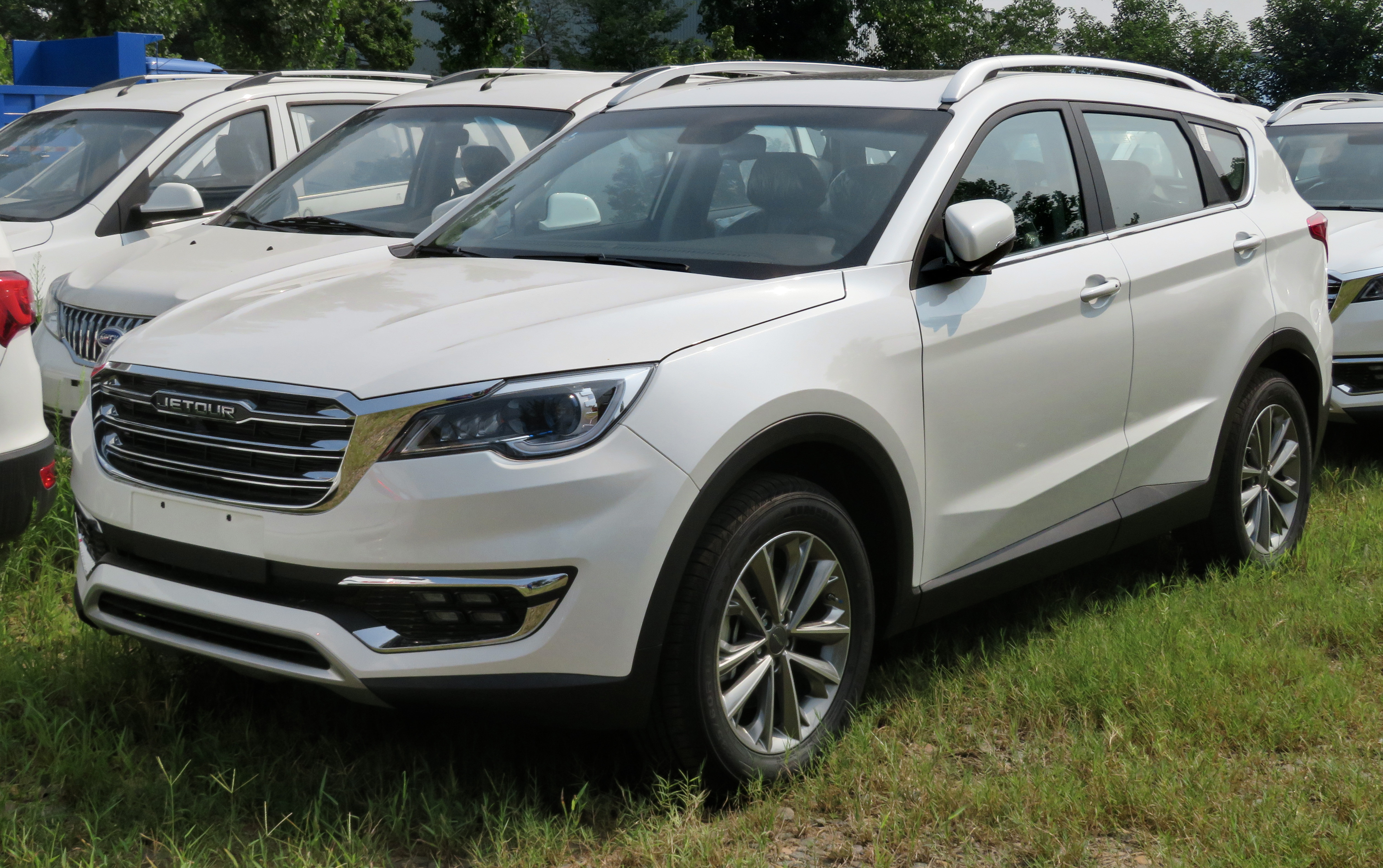

Overview
- Also called: Jetour X70S; Jetour X70S EV; Bahman Fidelity Prime (Iran); Sinogold Yuechi (cancelled); Soueast DX8/DX8S; MASTA EV (South Korea)
- Production: 2018–present
- Assembly: China: Kaifeng, Henan; Iran: Tehran (Bahman Group); South Korea: Cheonan
- Designer: Haibo Lin

Body and chassis
- Class: Mid-size crossover SUV
- Body style: 5-door SUV
- Layout: Front-engine, front-wheel-drive

Powertrain
- Engine: Petrol: 1.5 L I4 turbo
- Transmission: 6-speed manual 6-speed dual clutch

Dimensions
- Wheelbase: 2,745 mm (108.1 in)
- Length: 4,720 mm (185.8 in); 4,755 mm (187.2 in) (X70M)
- Width: 1,900 mm (74.8 in); 1,885 mm (74.2 in) (X70M)
- Height: 1,695 mm (66.7 in)

In 2018, the X70 comes in two models, including the base and S trim. The Jetour X70S is a more upmarket and luxurious trim level with different alloys and grille insert.

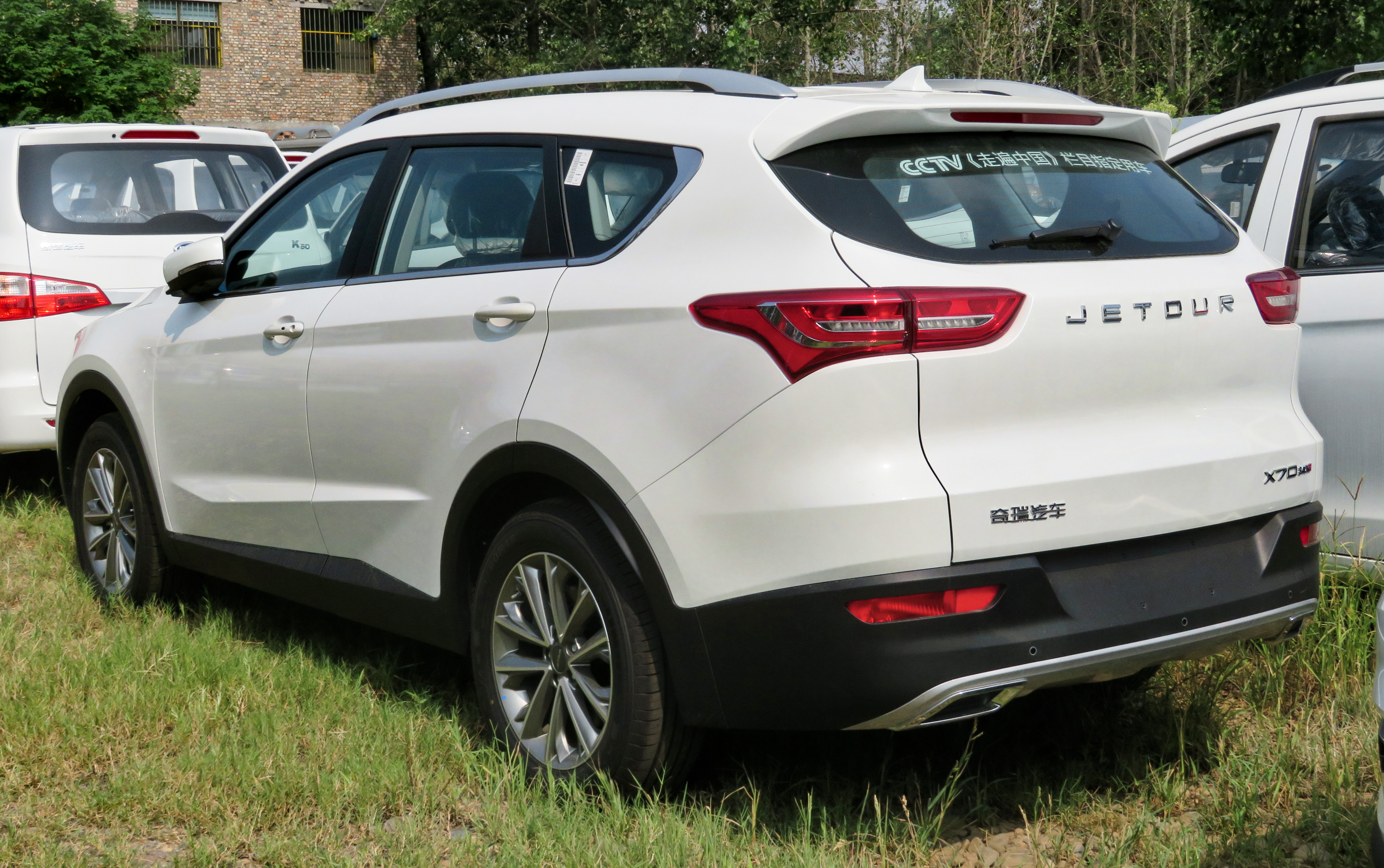
Rear view

The X70 is powered by a 1.5-litre turbo inline-four petrol engine producing 156 horsepower (116 kW; 158 PS) and 230 N⋅m (170 lb⋅ft; 23 kg⋅m), with transmission options including a 6-speed manual transmission or a 6-speed Dual-clutch transmission.

The model comes with features such as a 10.1-inch infotainment display, start button, keyless access, 360-degree vision system, power seat with parking sensor, independent climate control, sunroof, LED headlights, front and rear active cruise control, and automatic tailgate.

The powertrain of the vehicle comes with a 1.5-litre turbocharged petrol engine with 150-horsepower (112 kW; 152 PS) output and 8-speed automatic gearbox and 5-speed manual gearboxes. The Jetour X70 can be considered as the same segment as the Hyundai Santa Fe Sport with 4,720 mm (185.8 in) length, 1,900 mm (74.8 in) wide, 1,695 mm (66.7 in) tall and wheelbase of 2,745 mm (108.1 in).

=== 2019 facelift ===
The X70 2019 facelift was officially launched on 27 August 2019, with nine trim levels offered. It is powered by 1.5-litre turbocharged engine producing 156 horsepower (116 kW; 158 PS) and peak torque of 230 N⋅m (170 lb⋅ft; 23 kg⋅m) mated to a 6-manual transmission and 6-speed dual clutch transmission. The engine will meet the updated national VI emission standards.

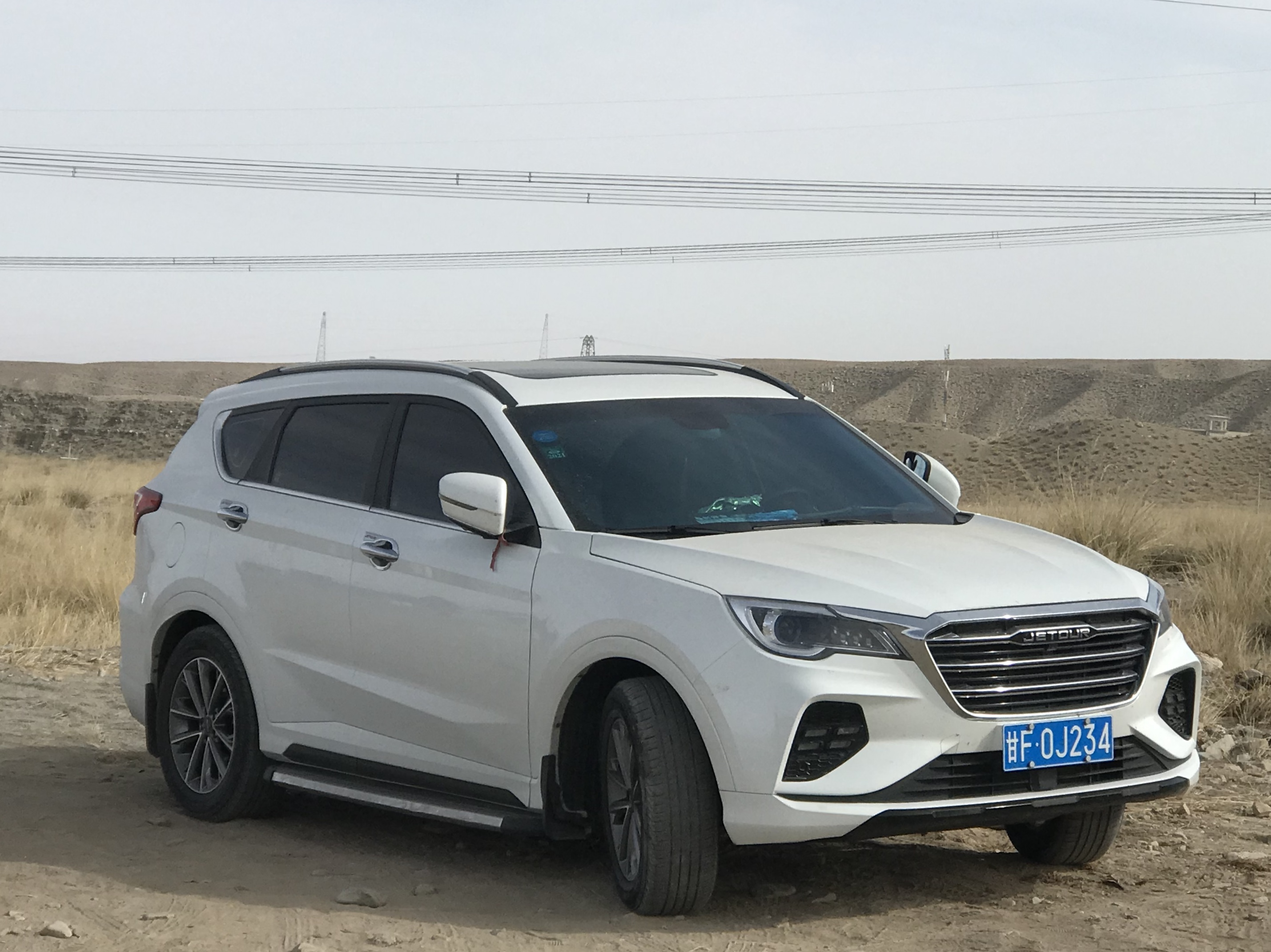
Jetour X70 2019 (facelift)

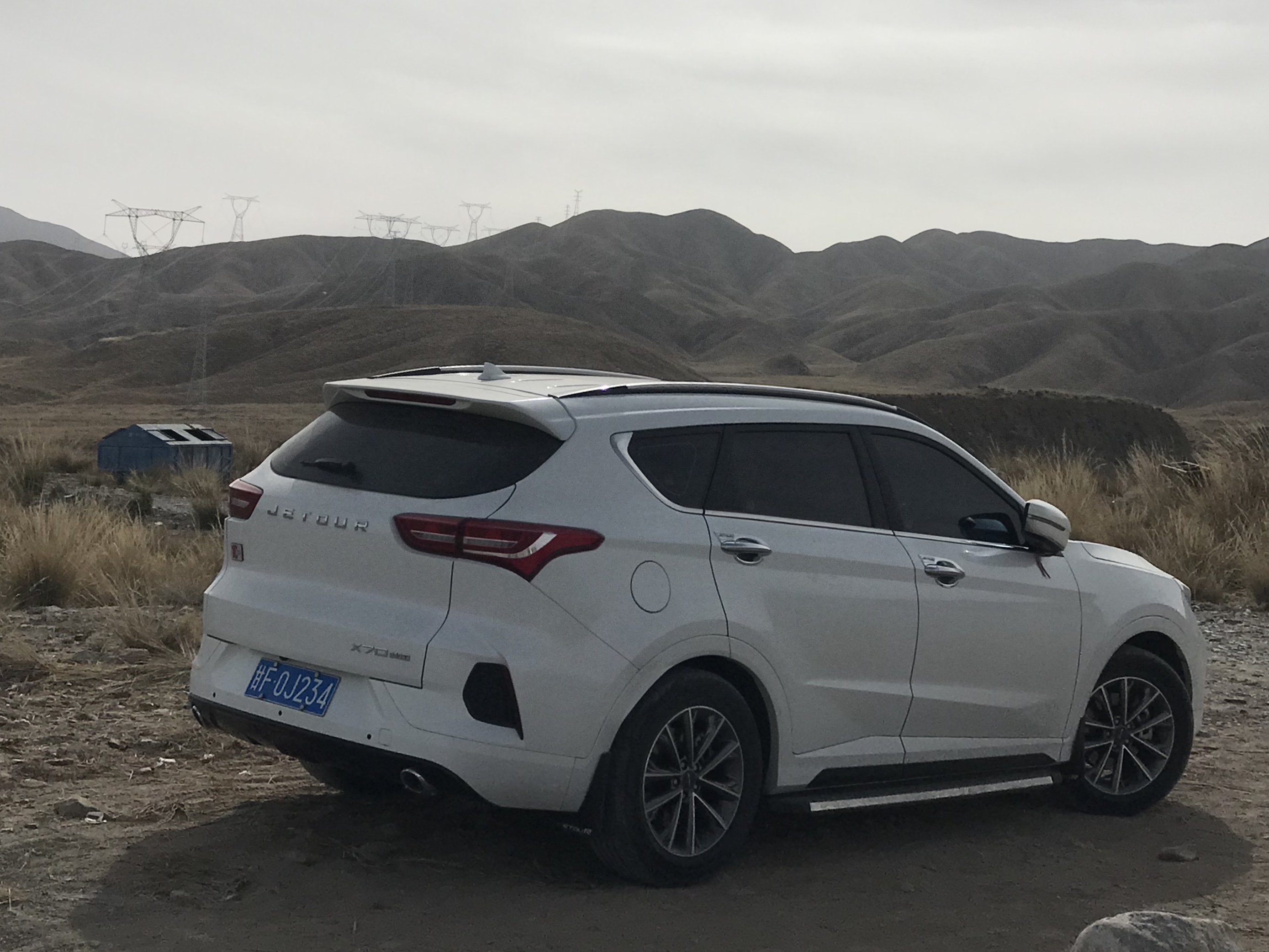
Rear view

=== Jetour X70 Coupe and Soueast DX8S ===
The X70 Coupe was unveiled at the 2018 Beijing Auto Show as a sportier variant of the X70. During the 2019 Shanghai Auto Show, the appearance of the production version has changed significantly. The design of the X70 Coupe is based on the X70 2019 facelift while featuring an integrated body-coloured grille frame. The X70 Coupe is powered by three power combinations, a 1.5-litre turbo engine mated to a 6-speed manual gearbox or 6-speed DCT and a 1.6-litre turbo engine mated to a 7-speed DCT.

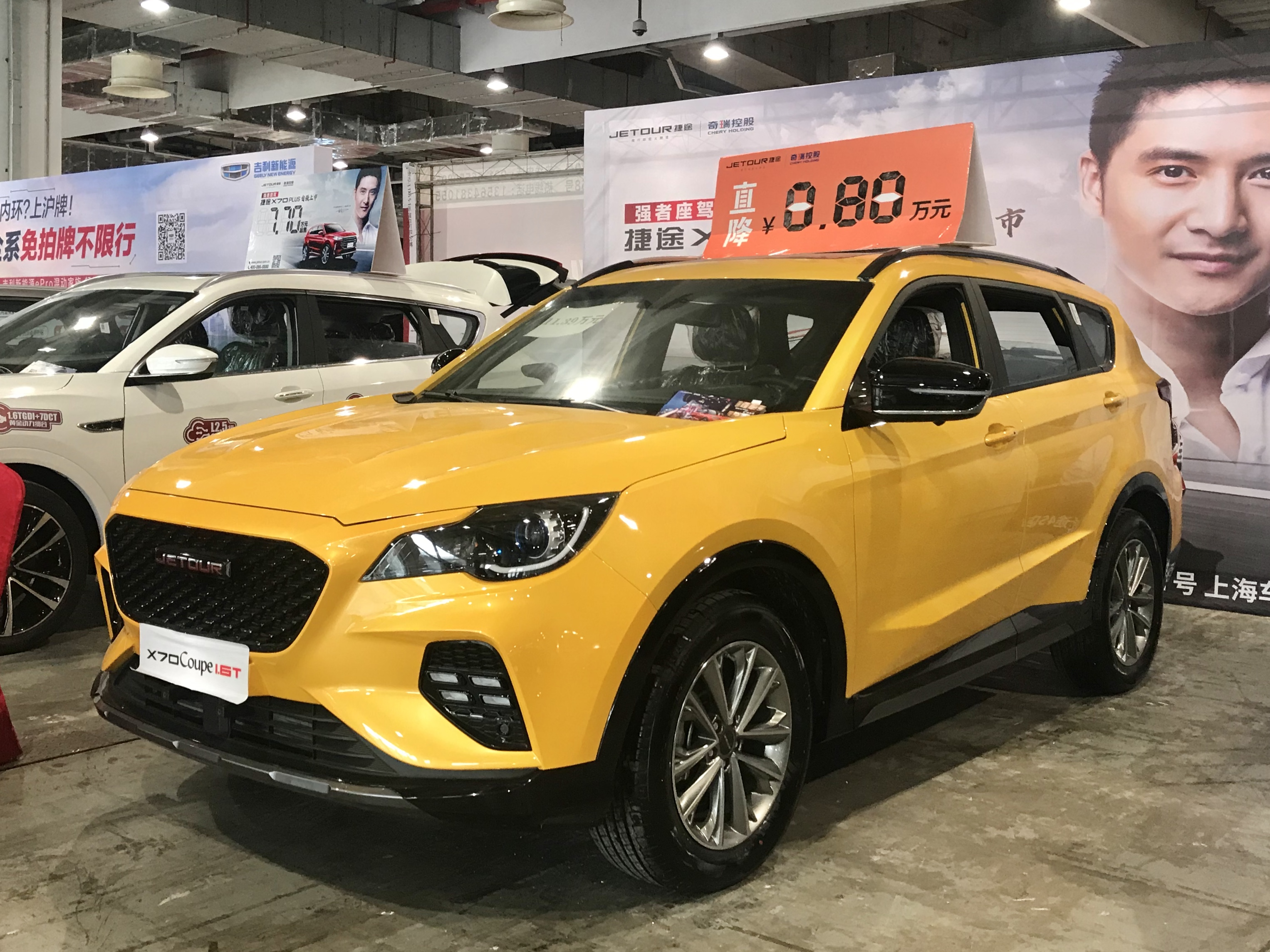
Jetour X70 Coupe

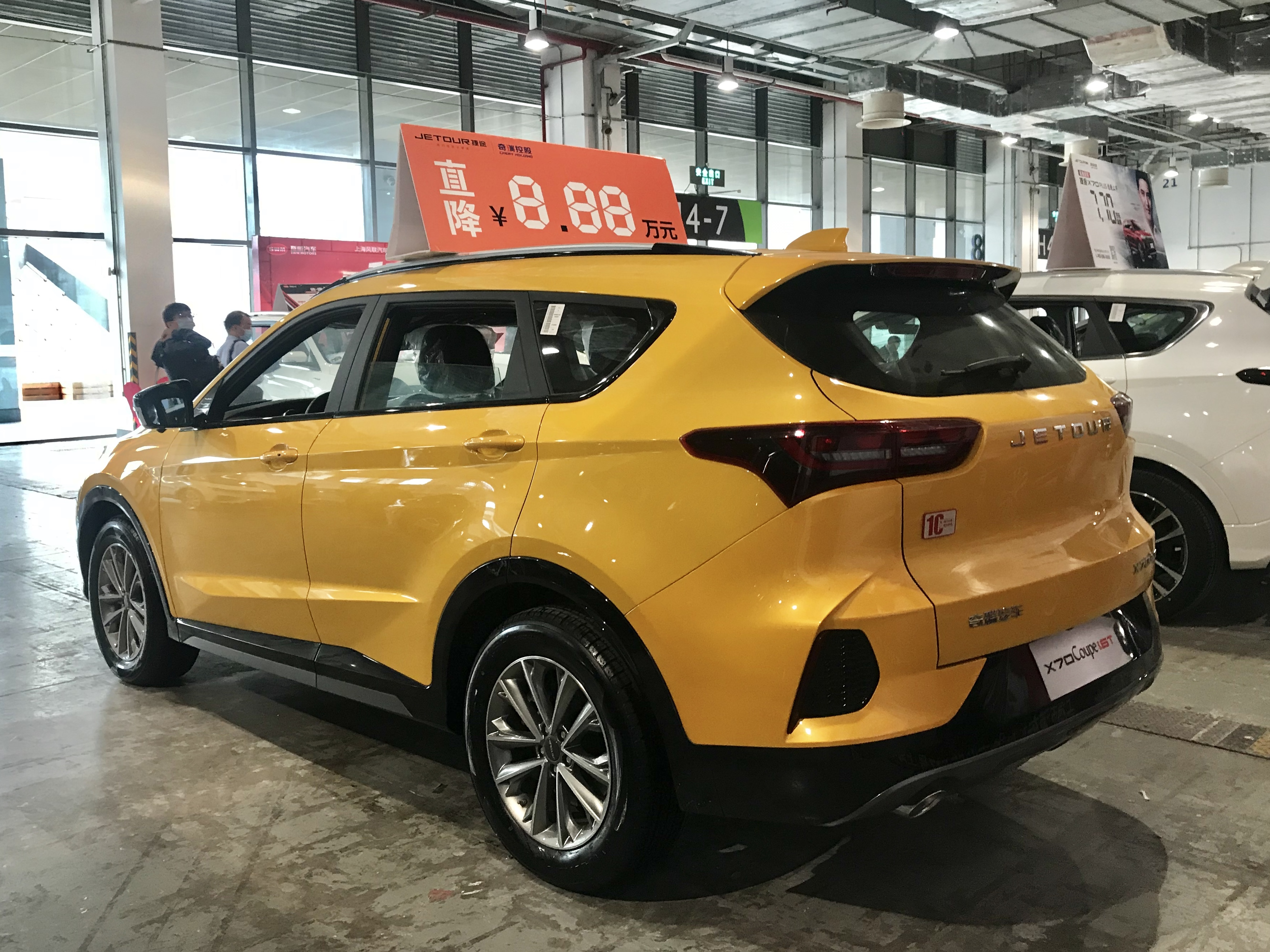
Rear view

From 2022, the X70 Coupe variant is rebadged as the Soueast DX8S.

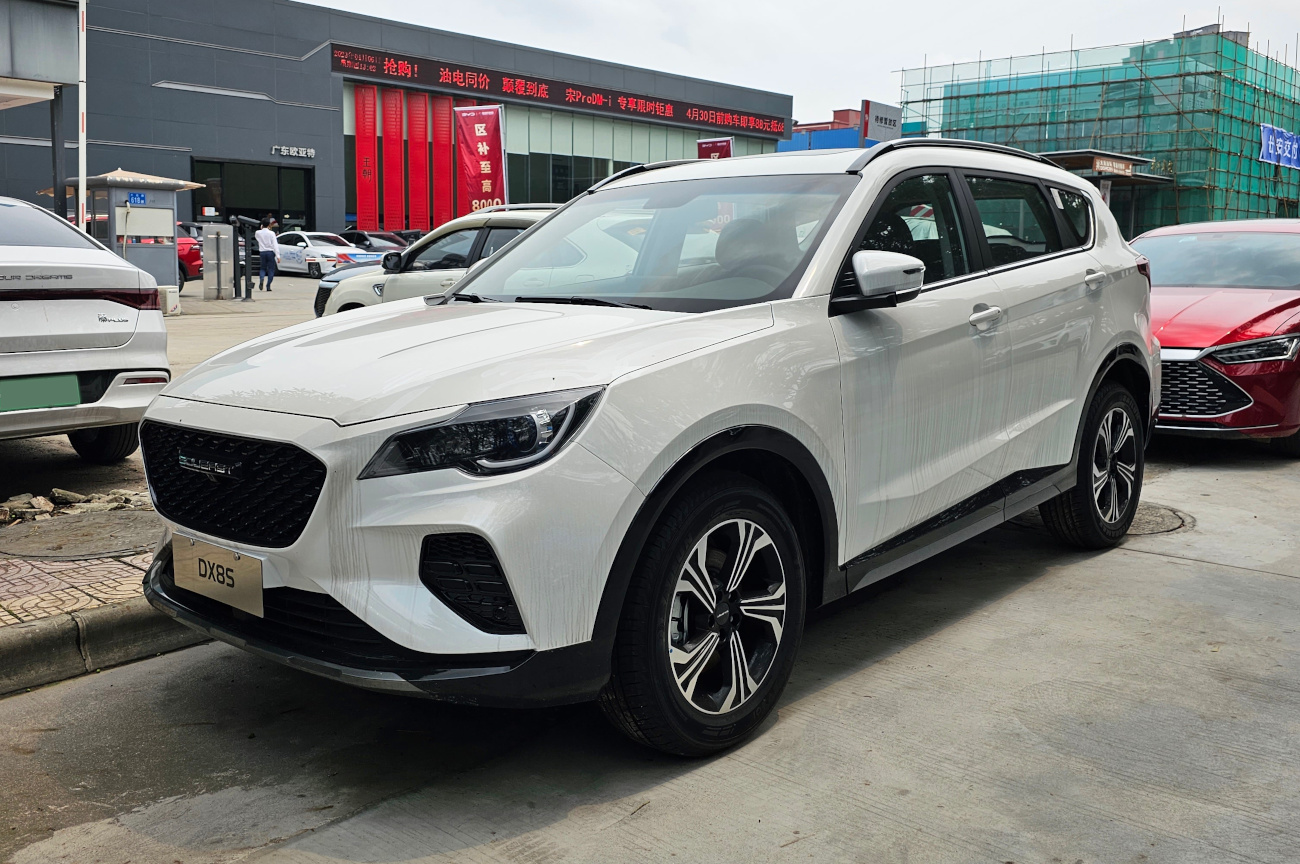
Soueast DX8S

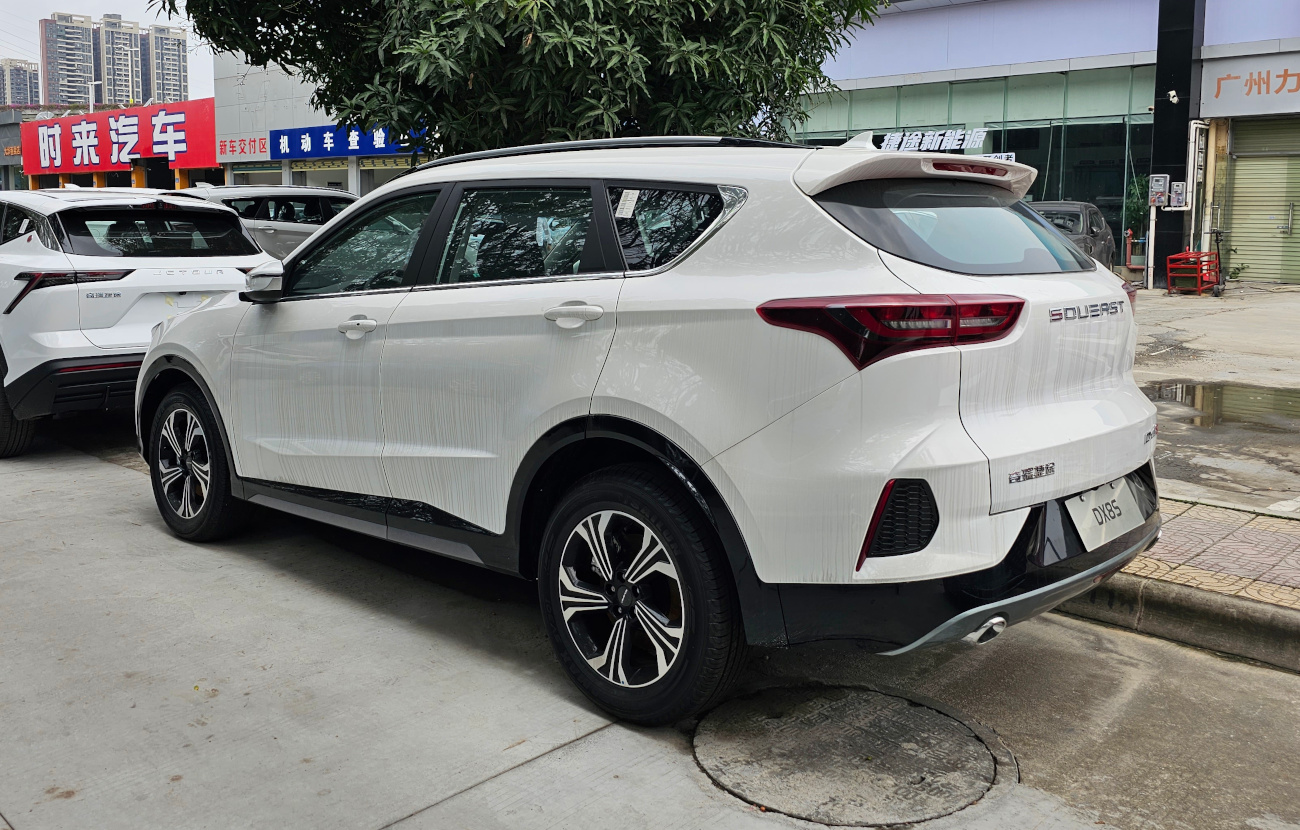
Rear view

=== Jetour X70M (2020-2022) ===
The X70M was launched in March 2020 as a more affordable variant of the X70 model range. According to officials, the "M" means "Mate", indicating the model being an affordable and volume-focused variant. There are eight trim levels for the 2020 X70, all featuring the 1.5-litre turbo engine mated to a dual-clutch gearbox or a manual transmission with the maximum horsepower of 156 PS (154 hp; 115 kW) and a maximum torque of 230 N⋅m (170 lb⋅ft; 23 kg⋅m).

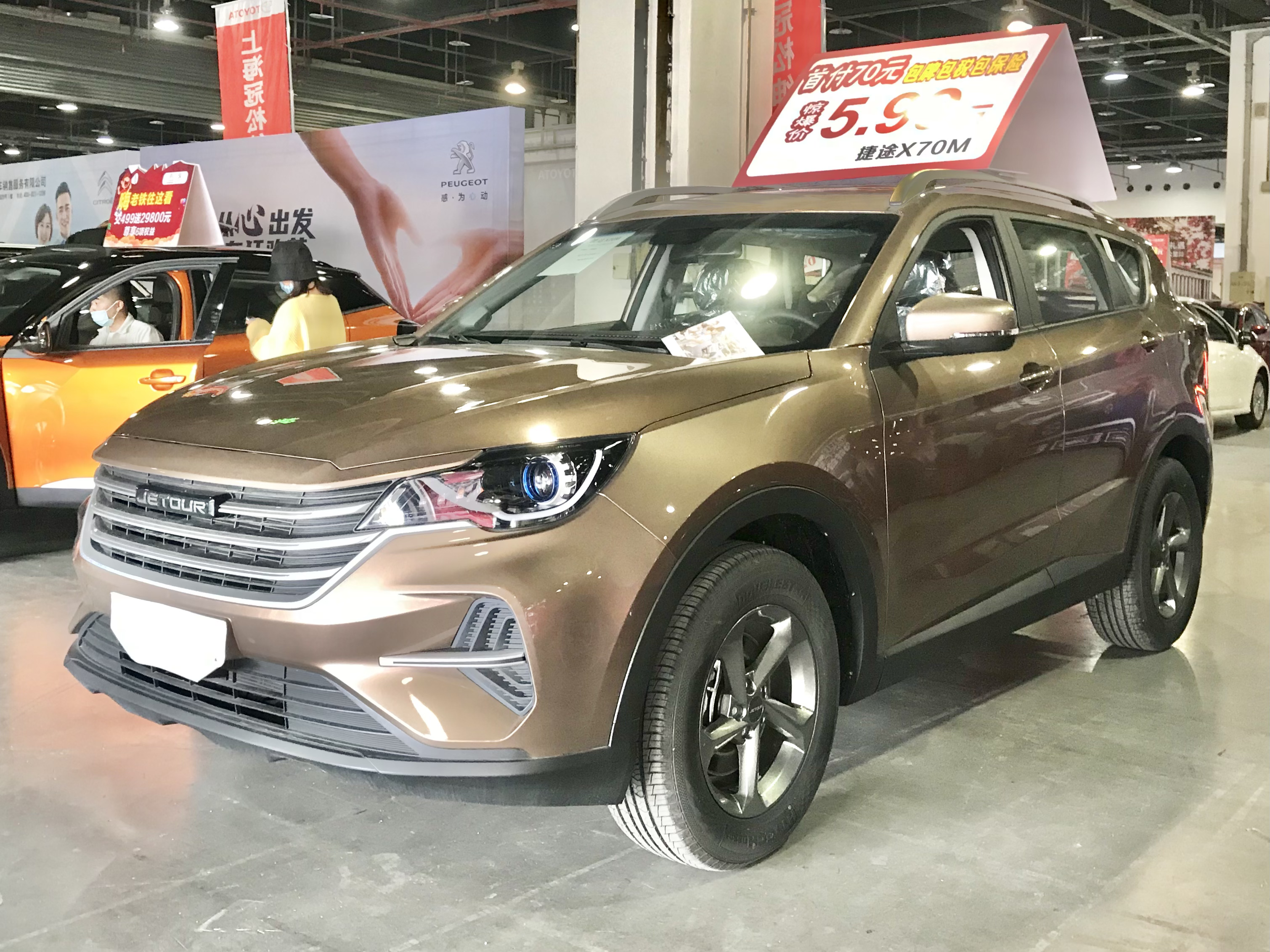
Jetour X70M

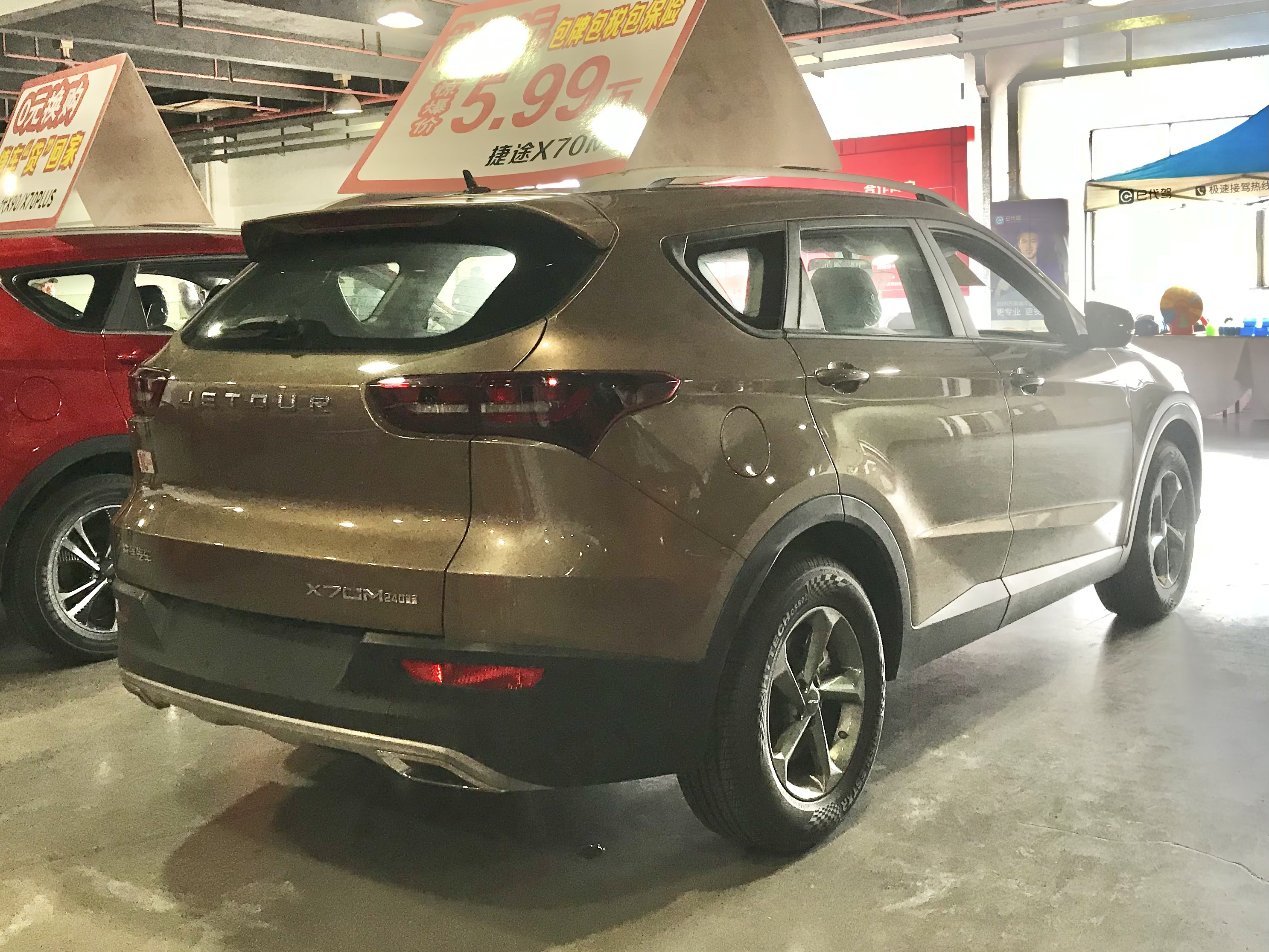
Rear view

=== Jetour X70S EV ===
Jetour debuted the X70S EV as its first all electric crossover model on the 2019 Shanghai Auto Show. As the name suggests, the X70S EV is based on the pre-facelift X70S and is the first new energy model from Jetour's production line, the exterior design and interior is essentially the same design of the X70S.

The X70S EV offers two variants of range including one that is good for 401 km (249 mi) and one that is capable of doing 450 km (280 mi) on one charge. The maximum power of the motor for the X70S EV is 125 kW (168 hp; 170 PS), and 300 N⋅m (221 lb⋅ft; 31 kg⋅m), capable of a maximum speed of 140 km/h (87 mph). The electronic gear lever on the X70S is replaced by technical looking electronic shift lever for the X70S EV, with the shift lever is equipped with functional buttons.

At the 2020 Guangzhou Auto Show, Jetour unveiled a facelift for the X70S EV featuring a design exclusively for the electric model. The facelift model continues to equip the electric motor producing 125 kW (168 hp; 170 PS) and 300 N⋅m (221 lb⋅ft; 31 kg⋅m) with a 56 kWh (200 MJ) battery rated 401 and 450 kilometres (249 and 280 mi) by NEDC.

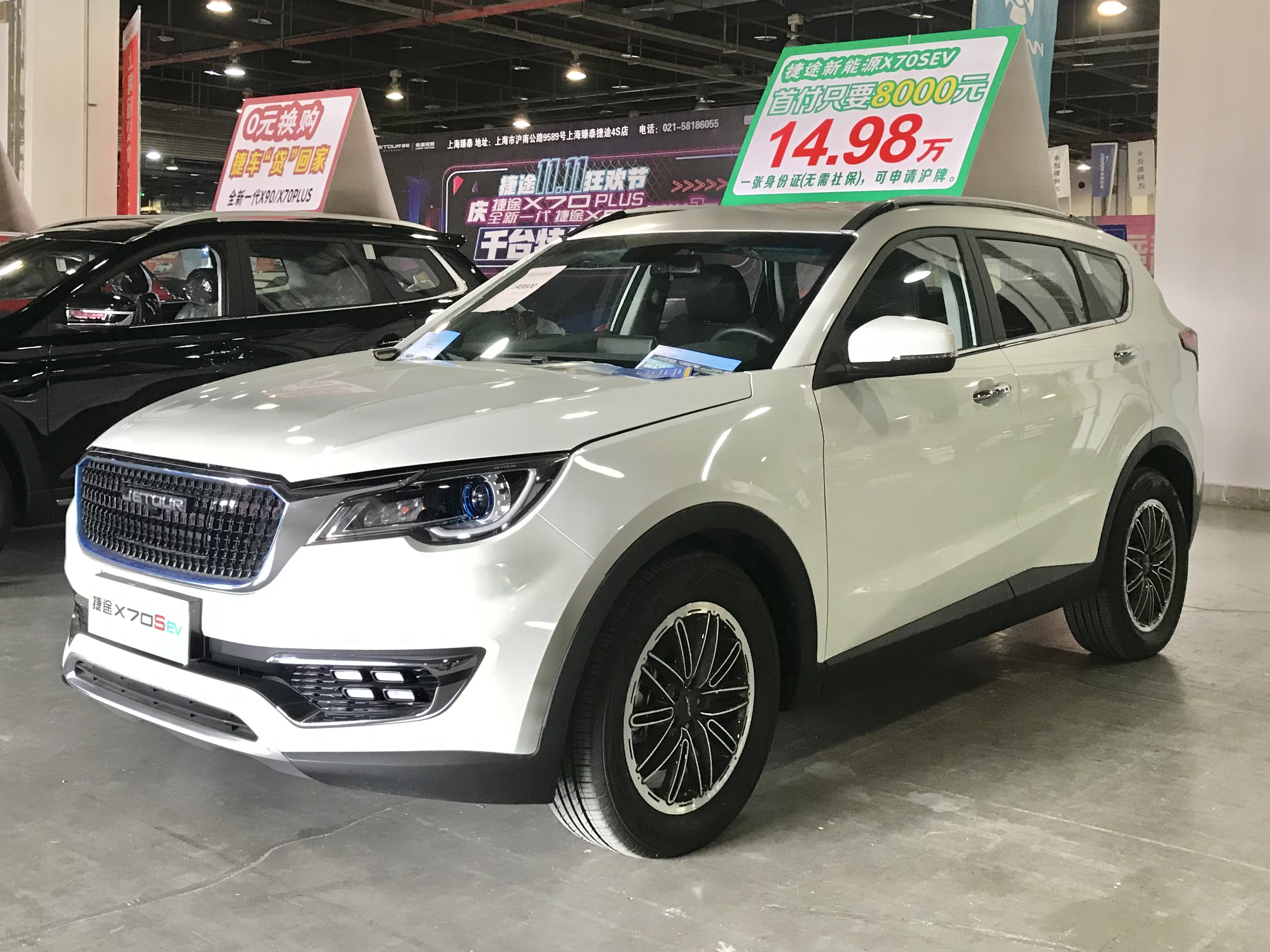
Jetour X70S EV

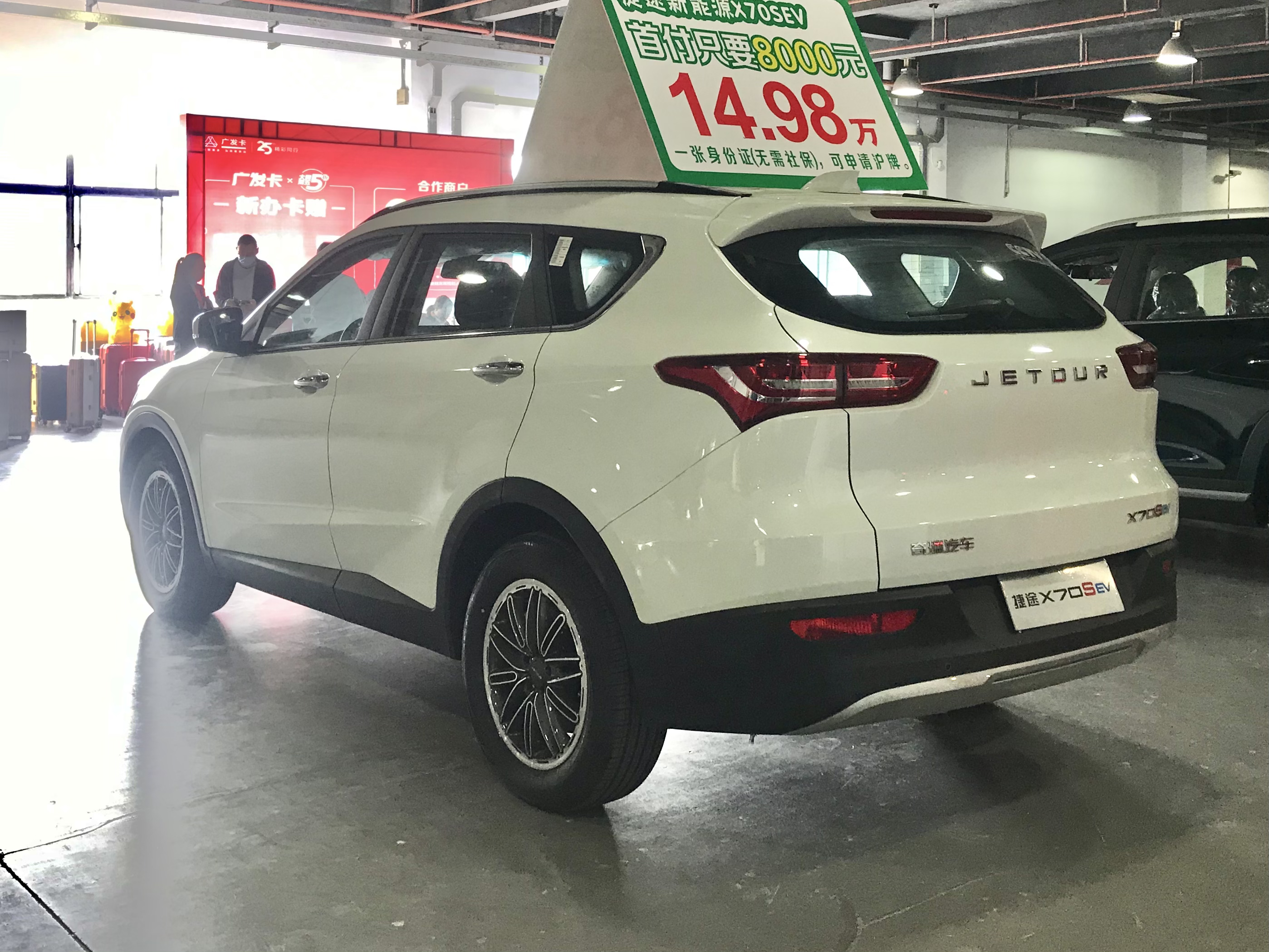
Rear view

=== MASTA EV ===
The South Korean specification of X70S and it was independently designed by MASTA EV, the South Korean EV manufacturer. The model were first revealed in 2021 Seoul Mobility Show and their first SUV will be launch in October 2022.

The company said that the model could run approximately 434 kilometres (270 mi) and the Samsung SDI battery will mount on this model.

== Jetour X70 Plus (2020) ==
Jetour X70 Plus
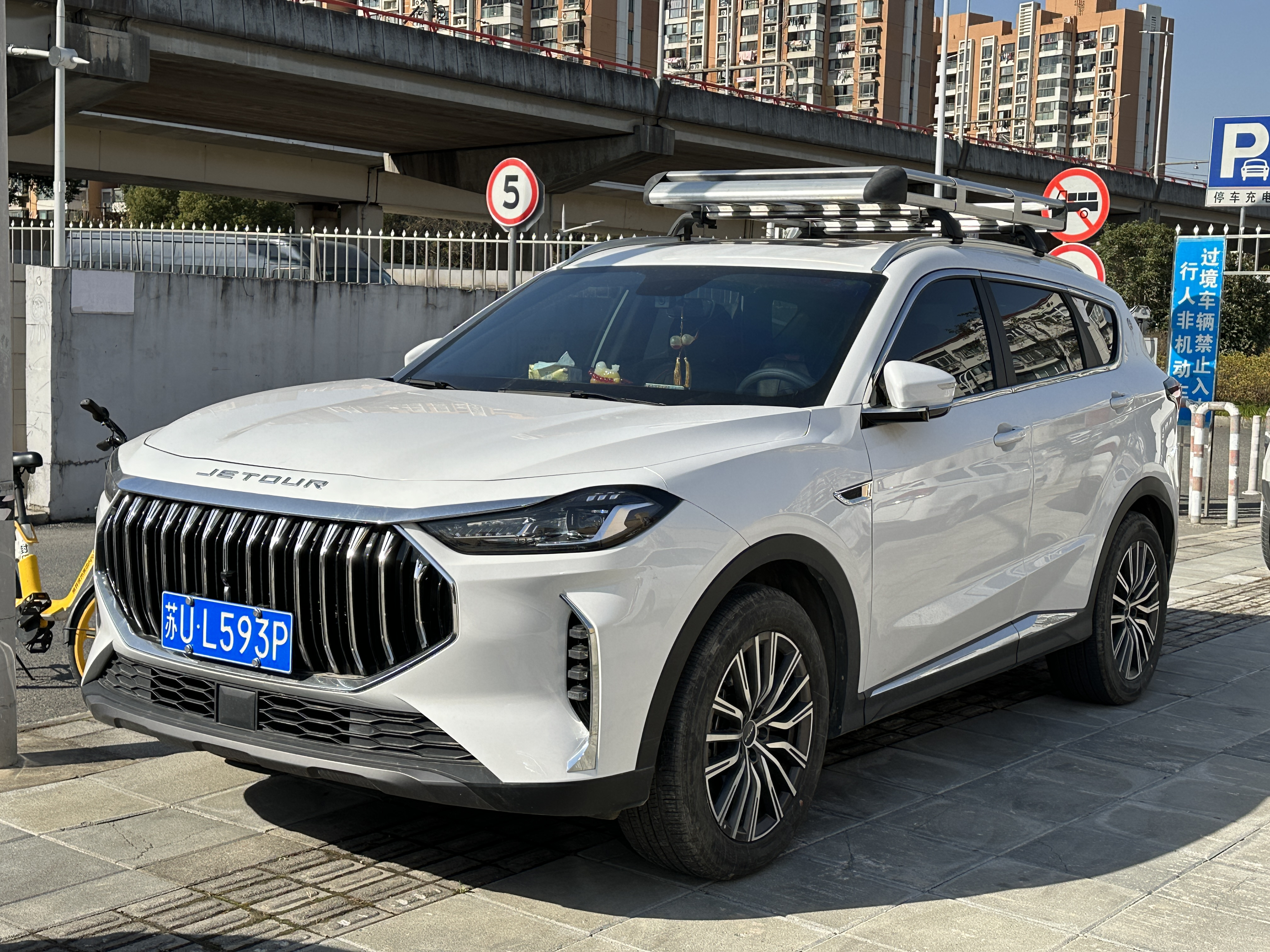
- Jetour X70 Plus facelift (2020)

Overview
- Also called: Jetour Shanhai L7 (PHEV); Jetour VT9 (Malaysia); Soueast S07; Sportequipe 7 GTW (Italy); Bahman Fidelity Prestige (Iran); Soueast DX8 Plus; Wallys Wolf (Tunisia)
- Production: 2020–present
- Assembly: China: Kaifeng, Henan; Indonesia: Bekasi, West Java (HIM); Iran: Tehran (Bahman Group); Russia: Kaliningrad (Avtotor); Malaysia: Johor Bahru (Berjaya Assembly)

Body and chassis
- Class: Mid-size crossover SUV
- Body style: 5-door SUV
- Layout: Front-engine, front-wheel-drive

Powertrain
- Engine: Petrol: 1.5 L ACTECO SQRE4T15C I4 turbo; 1.6 L ACTECO SQRF4J16C I4 turbo; Petrol plug-in hybrid; 1.5 L ACTECO SQRH4J15 turbo I4
- Electric motor: 199 kW (271 PS; 267 hp) 2x Permanent magnet Syncronus motors
- Power output: 115 kW (156 PS; 154 hp) (1.5 Turbo); 145 kW (197 PS; 194 hp) (1.6 Turbo); 200 kW (272 PS; 268 hp) (1.5 C-DM PHEV)
- Transmission: 6-speed manual 6-speed dual clutch 7-speed dual clutch 2-speed DHT
- Hybrid drivetrain: Kunpeng super hybrid C-DM system
- Battery: 19.43 kWh Gotion High-tech NMC

Dimensions
- Wheelbase: 2,745 mm (108.1 in)
- Length: 4,749 mm (187.0 in)
- Width: 1,900 mm (74.8 in)
- Height: 1,720 mm (67.7 in)

The X70 Plus is a slightly larger and more upmarket variant of the X70 based on the same platform while featuring a redesign front and rear. Previewed by the Jetour X Concept during Auto Shanghai 2019, the X70 Plus debuted during the 2020 Beijing International Auto Show that officially started on 26 September 2020. From the exterior, the X70 Plus is longer and taller than the regular X70, and offers 5-seater, 6-seater, and 7-seater models.

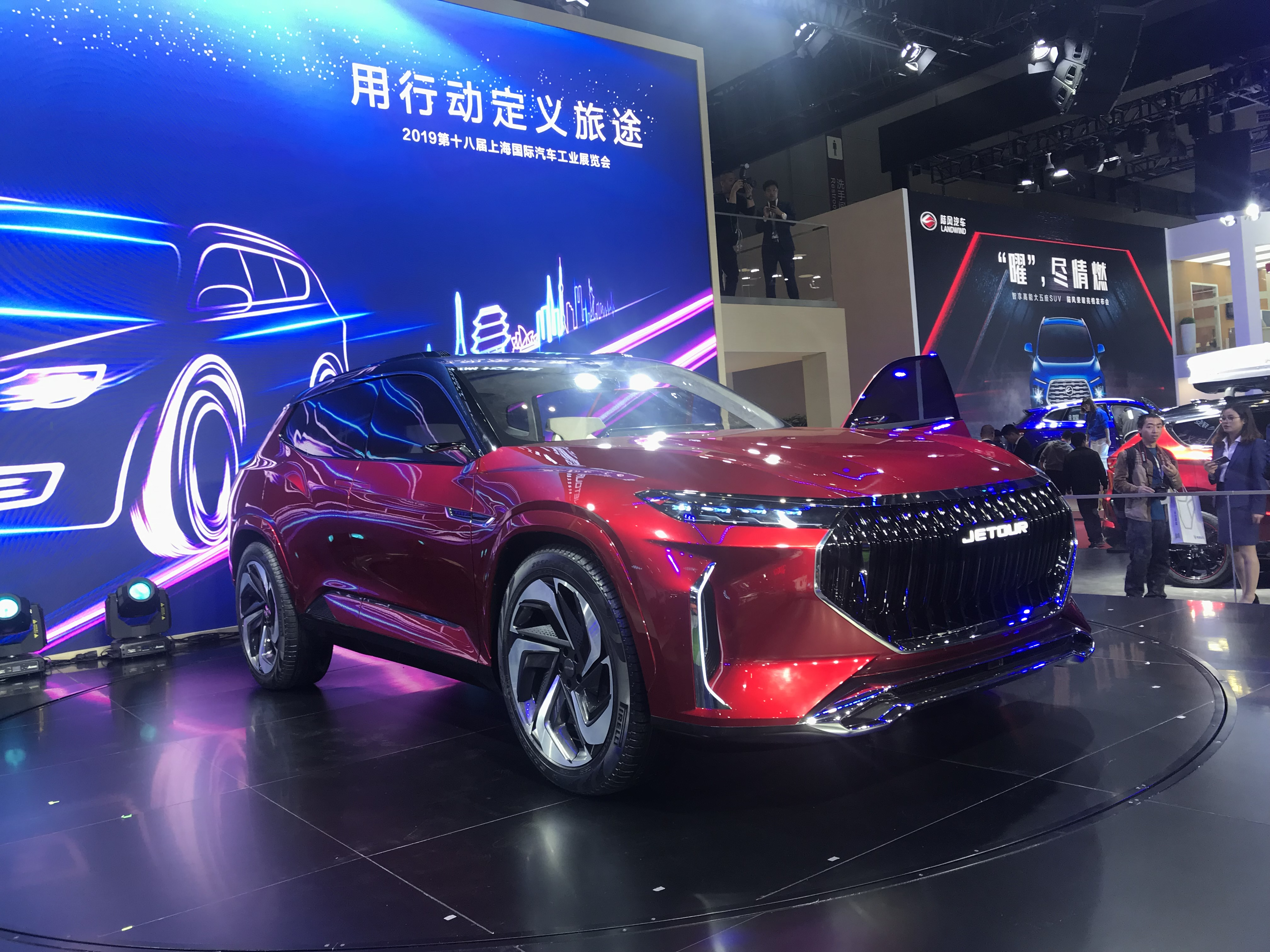
Jetour X Concept

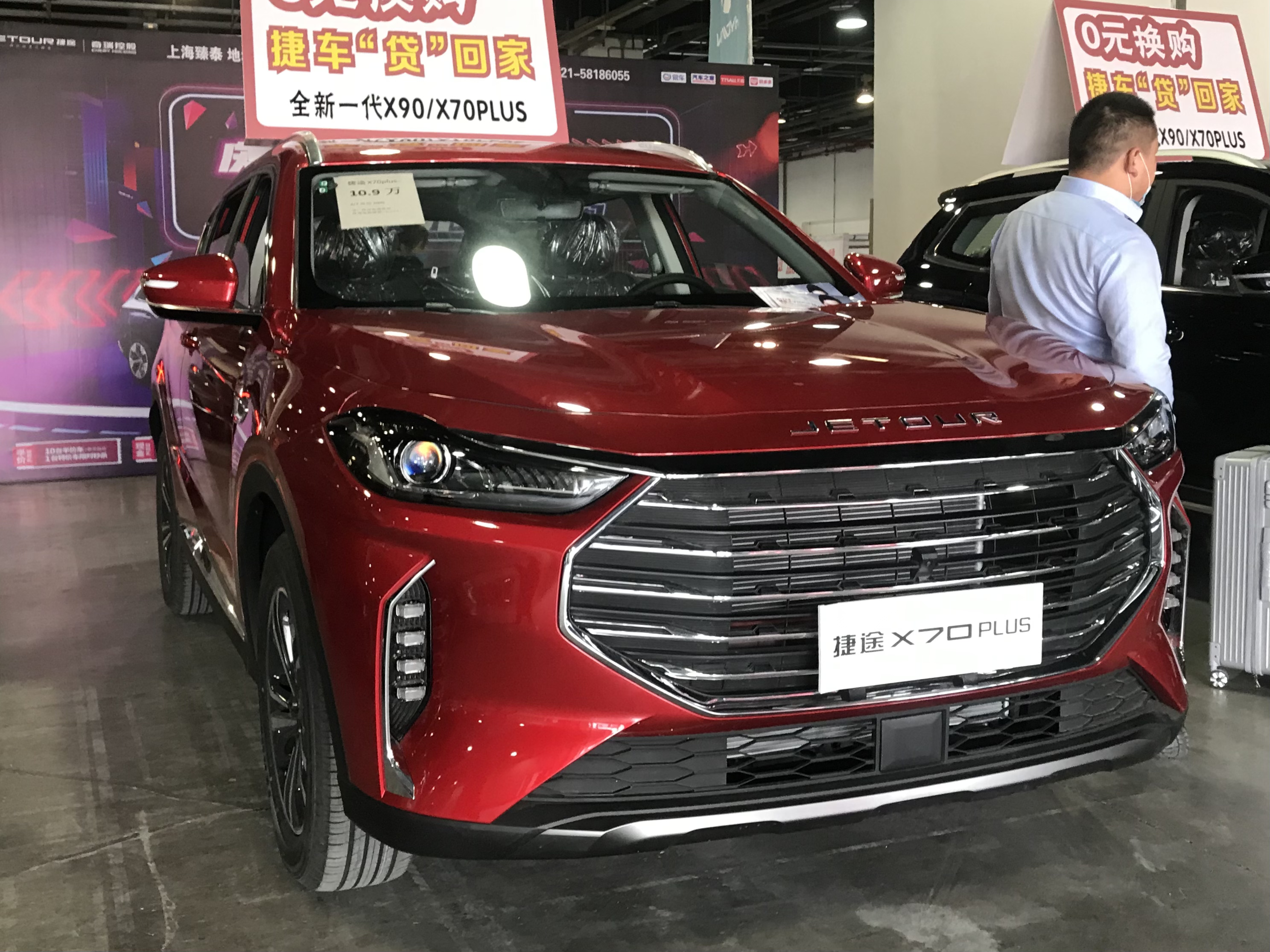
Jetour X70 Plus production (for comparison)
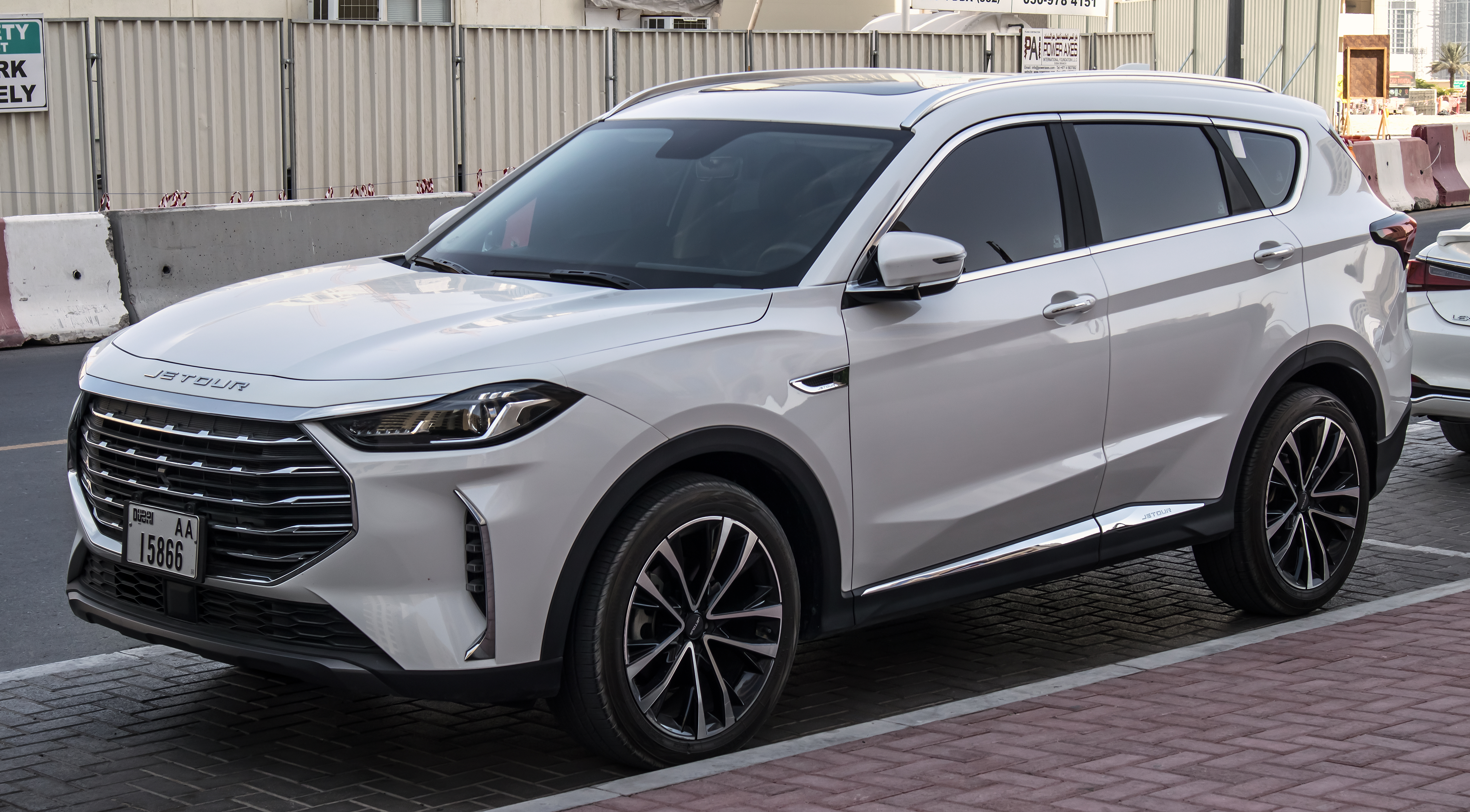
Jetour X70 Plus in UAE (front)

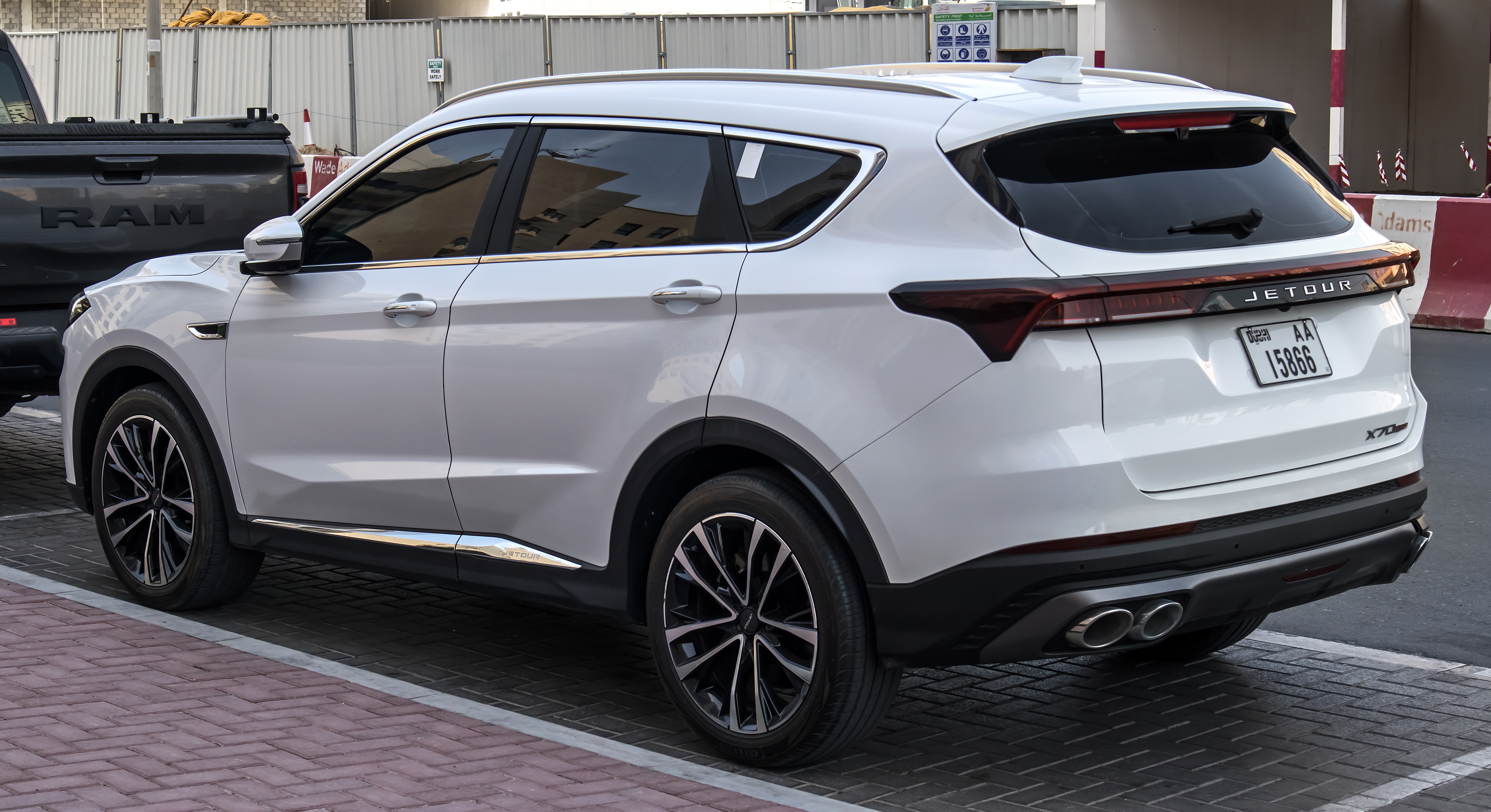
Jetour X70 Plus in UAE (rear)

For the interior, the X70 Plus features a 10.25-inch full LCD smart dual screen and air conditioning controls are integrated in a touch panel.

The X70 Plus is powered by a 1.5-litre turbo engine with a maximum output of 156 horsepower (116 kW; 158 PS) mated to a 6-speed manual gearbox or 6-speed DCT and a 1.6-litre turbo engine with a maximum output of 197 horsepower (147 kW; 200 PS) mated to a 7-speed DCT which is the same as the Jetour X70 Coupe.

=== 2020 facelift ===
The X70 Plus received a facelift in 2020 featuring vertical slotted grilles.

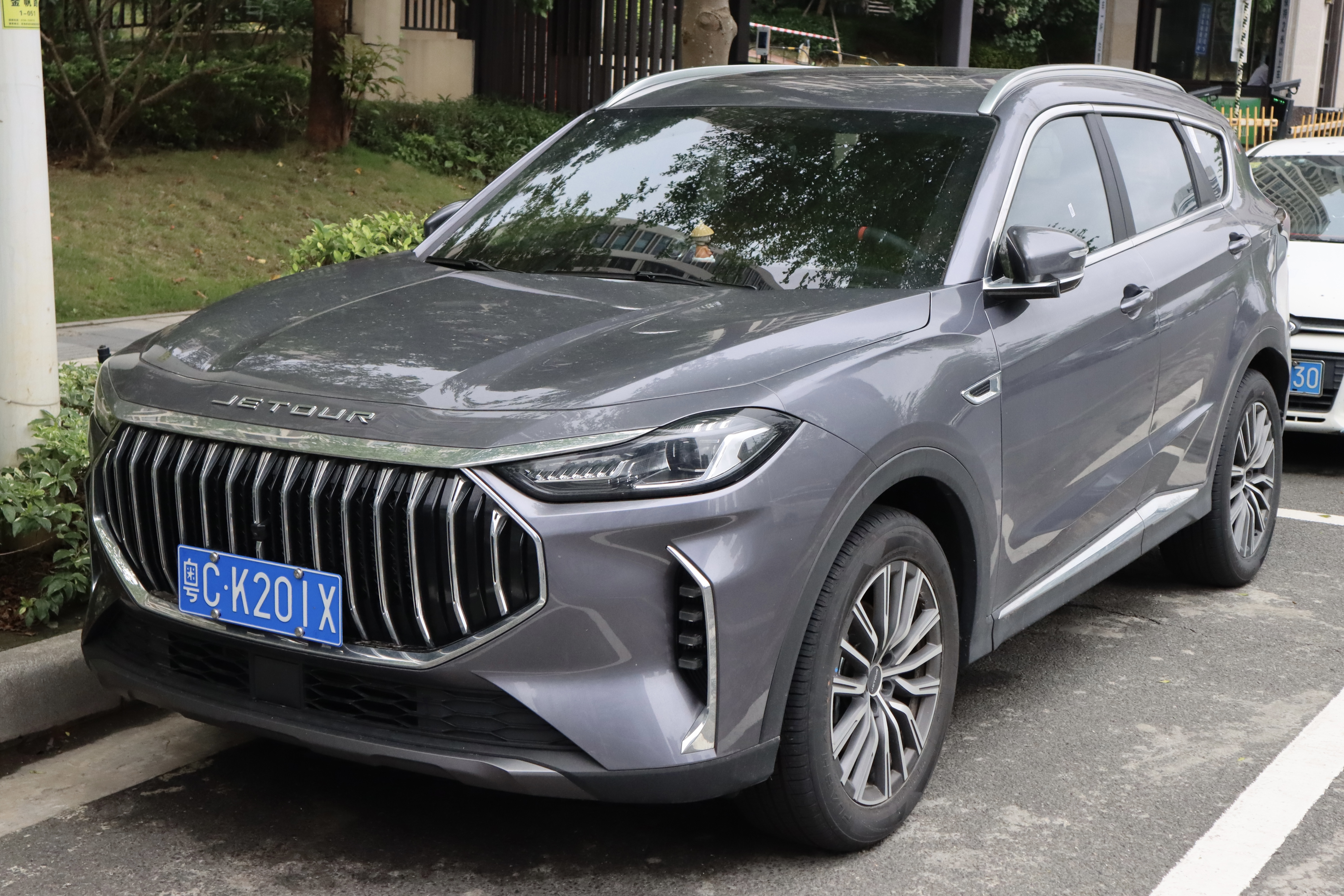
First facelift Jetour X70 Plus (front)

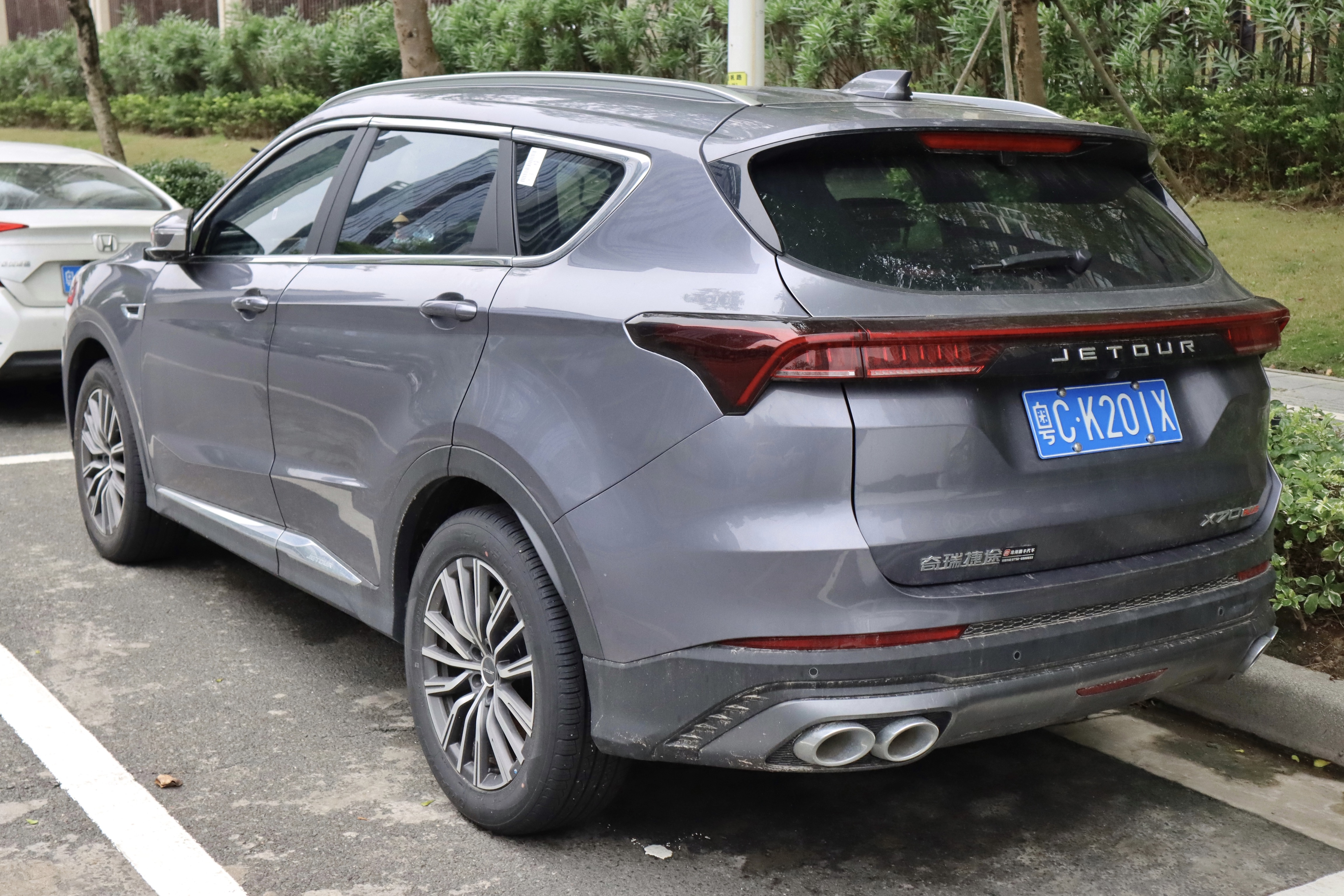
First facelift Jetour X70 Plus (rear)

=== Jetour X70 C-DM ===
The X70 C-DM is the plug-in hybrid variant of the Jetour X70 Plus, and was launched in February 2024. The C-DM powertrain of the X70 C-DM uses a 1.5-litre turbo inline-four engine with an electric motor. The pure electric CLTC range is 110 km (68 mi) while the combined range is 1,200 km (750 mi).

=== 2024 facelift ===
The X70 Plus received another facelift in May 2024, featuring a restyled front fascia with a larger grille that has horizontal slats, new graphics for the LED taillights, a revised rear bumper, and an interior that includes larger dual displays and a new gear selector.

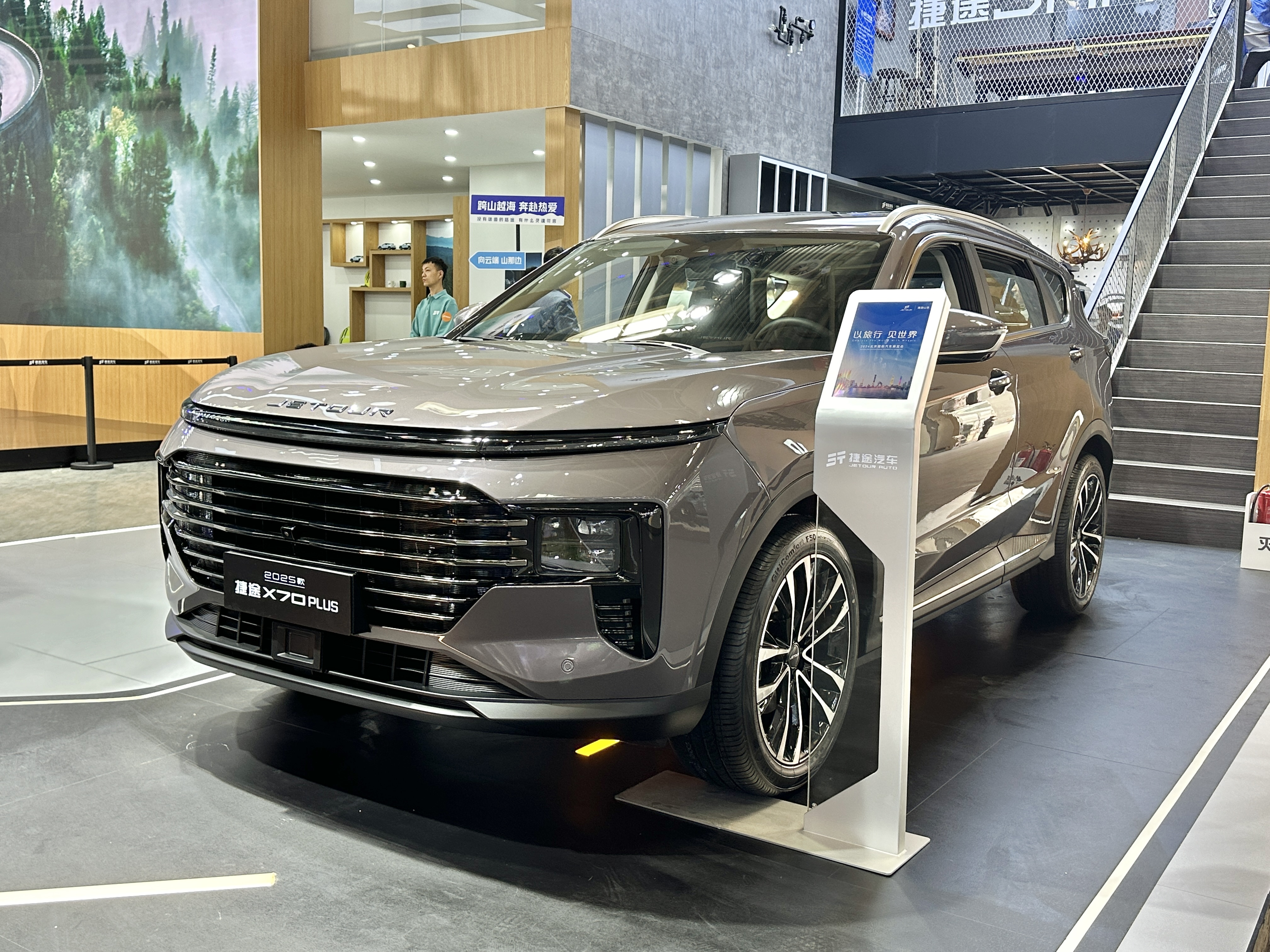
Second facelift Jetour X70 Plus (front)

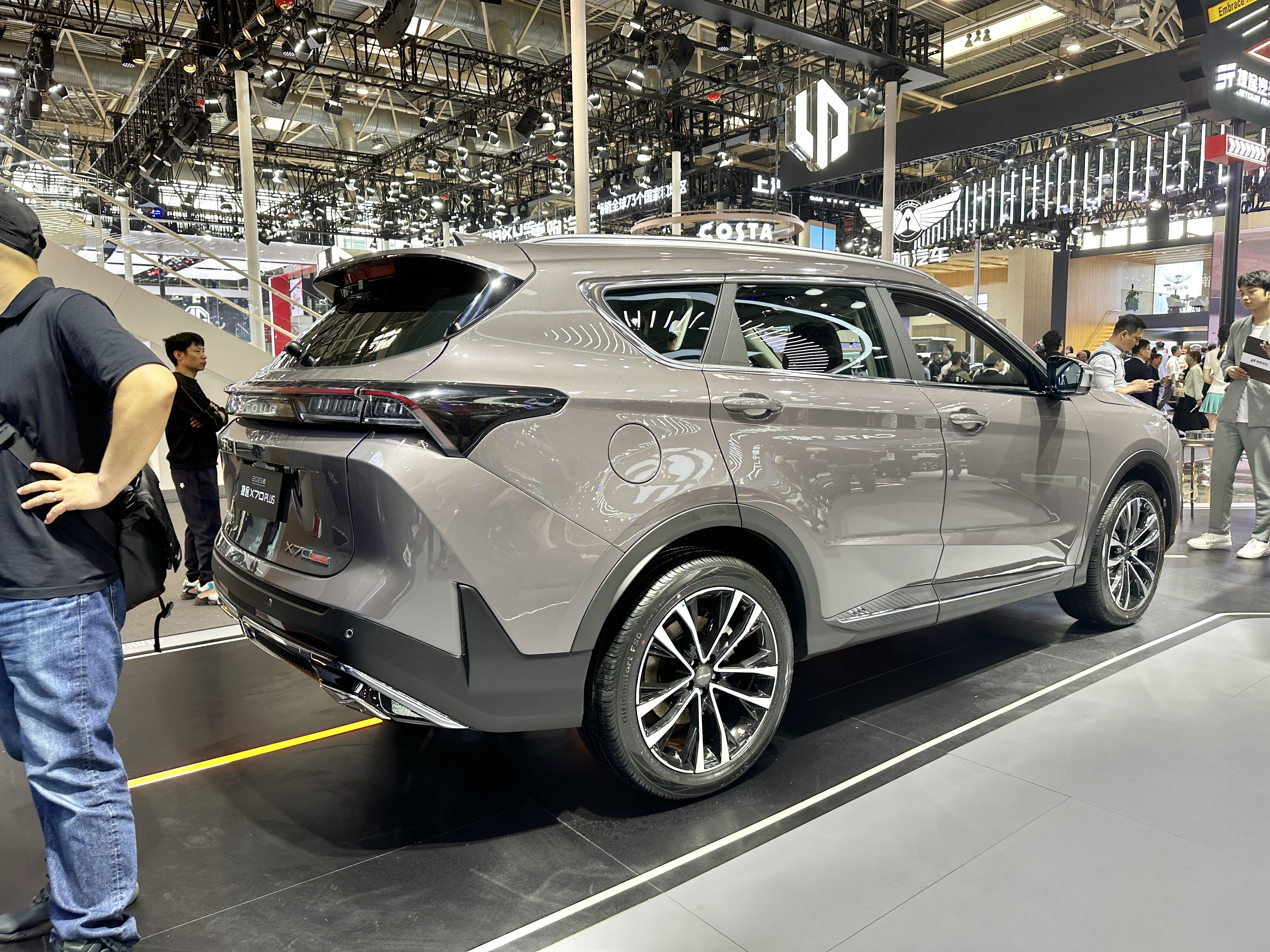
Second facelift Jetour X70 Plus (rear)

=== 2026 facelift ===
Third facelift Jetour X70 Plus (front)

Third facelift Jetour X70 Plus (rear)

=== Jetour Shanhai L7 ===
Based on the 2024 facelift of the X70 Plus, the Shanhai L7 is the plug-in hybrid variant of the X70 Plus and was planned to replace the X70 C-DM launched just 2 months earlier. The Jetour Shanhai L7 is equipped with the C-DM powertrain, which is Chery’s Kunpeng plugin hybrid system. The Shanhai L7 uses a 1.5 litre turbo inline-four engine developing 115 kW along with an electric motor. The top speed of the Shanhai L7 is 180 km/h.

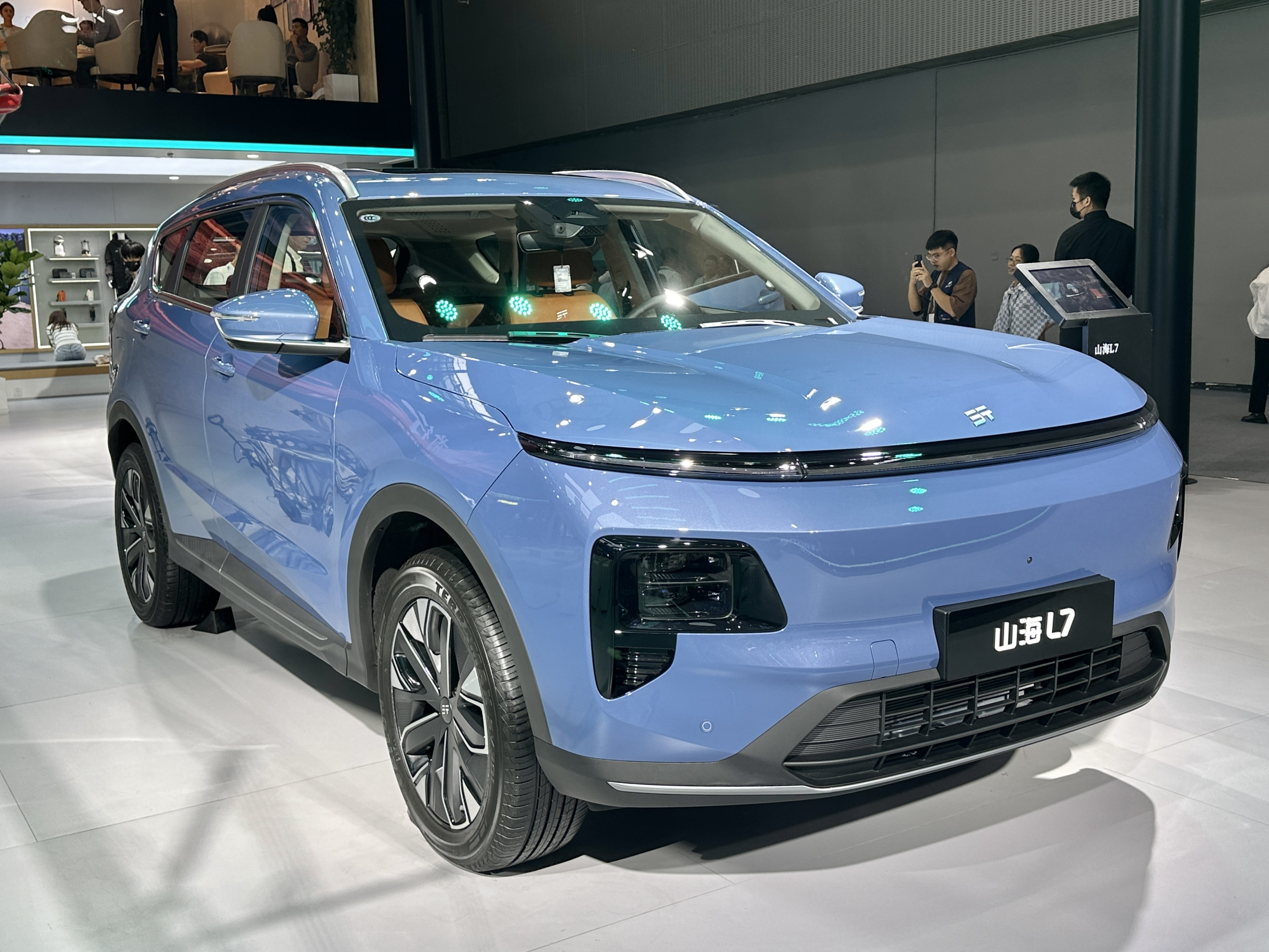
Jetour Shanhai L7

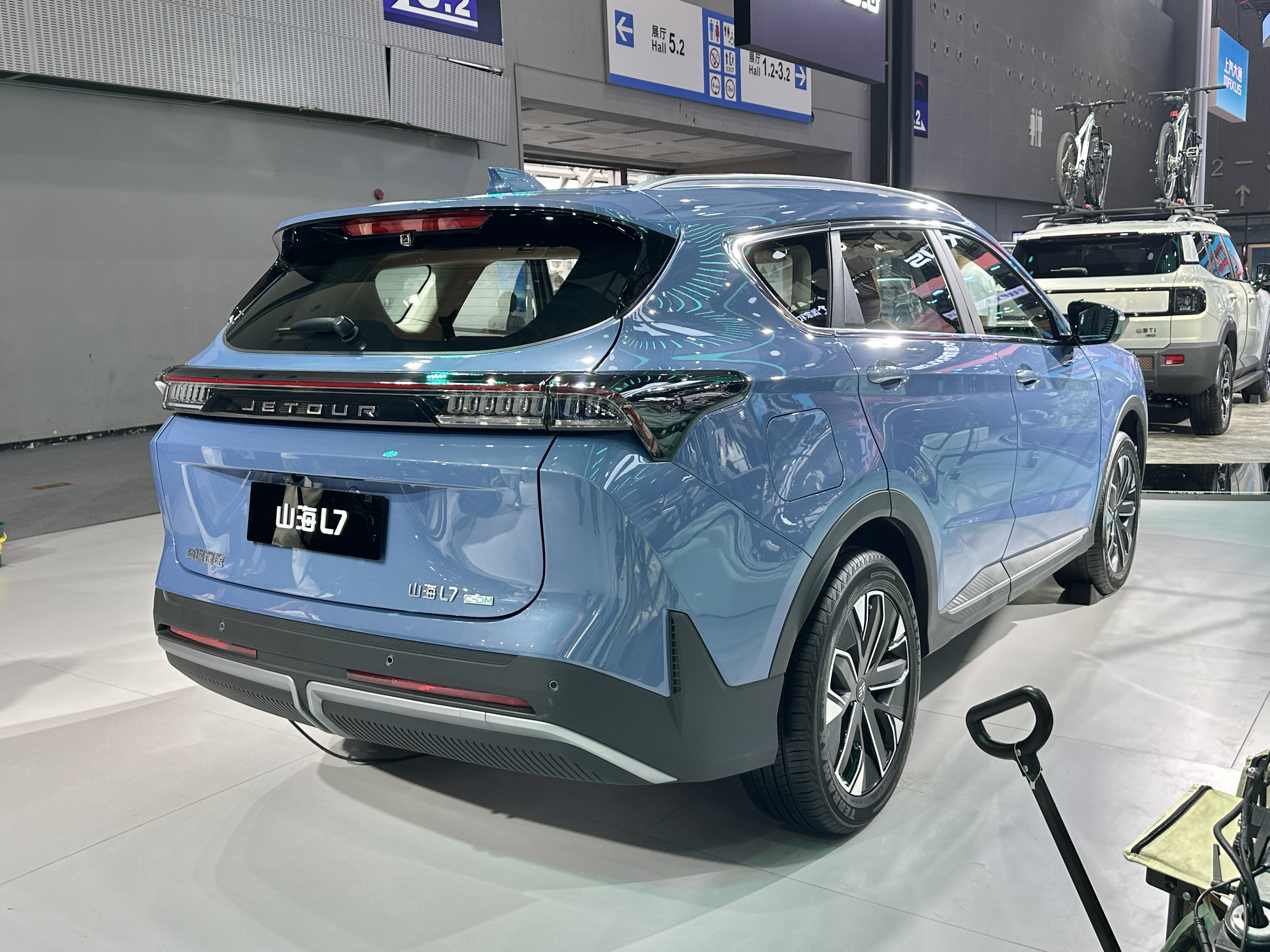
Rear view

=== Overseas markets ===
The Jetour X70 Plus has been introduced in several countries including Cambodia, the Philippines, Malaysia, the United Arab Emirates, Oman, Mexico, Ecuador, Qatar, Saudi Arabia, Jordan, Myanmar, Chile, Paraguay, Egypt and Iran.

==== Argentina ====
The X70 Plus was launched in Argentina on 29 October 2024, it is available in the sole unnamed variant powered by a 1.6-litre turbocharged petrol engine.

==== Egypt ====
In May 2025, the locally assembled X70 Plus version was launched for sale through its official distributor, Kasrawy Group.

In the economic family car category, the locally assembled X70 Plus won the title of Best Economic Family Car in Egypt for 2025 in Egy Car annual poll, receiving 95% of the votes (1,591 votes).

==== Indonesia ====
The X70 Plus was introduced in Indonesia in July 2024 at the 31st Gaikindo Indonesia International Auto Show. Both X70 Plus and Dashing went on sale in 15 November 2024. As one of Jetour's first models sold in Indonesia, available variants for the X70 Plus are the Journey and Inspira. It is only available with a 1.5-litre turbocharged petrol engine. It is locally assembled at Handal Indonesia Motor's facility in Bekasi, West Java, with production commenced on 30 October 2024.

==== Malaysia ====
The X70 Plus is marketed in Malaysia as the VT9, due to naming conflict with the Proton X70. The VT9 was launched on 8 May 2025, with two trim levels: Comfort and Prime, it is powered by a 1.5-litre turbocharged petrol engine.

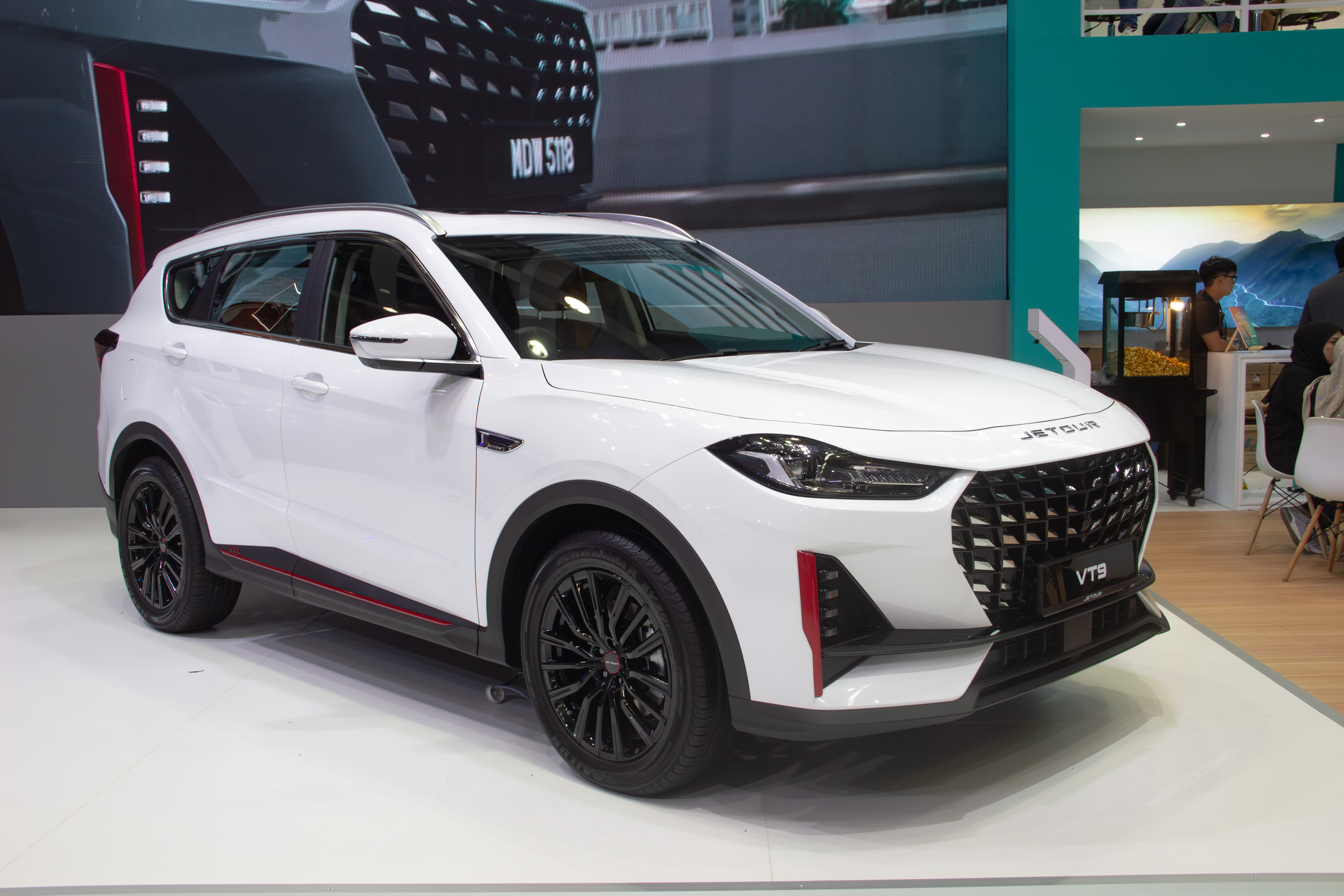
Jetour VT9

==== Mexico ====
The X70 Plus was launched in Mexico on 5 April 2023, as part of Jetour's entry to the market. It is available in the sole unnamed variant powered by a 1.6-litre turbocharged petrol engine.

==== Pakistan ====
The X70 Plus was launched in Pakistan on 20 February 2025, alongside the Dashing as part of Jetour's entry to the market. It is available in the sole unnamed variant powered by a 1.5-litre turbocharged petrol engine.

==== Philippines ====
The X70 Plus was launched in the Philippines on 15 March 2023 as part of Jetour's entry to the market. It is available in a sole variant powered by a 1.5-litre turbocharged petrol engine. The Lightning i-DM plug-in hybrid variant was added in March 2025.

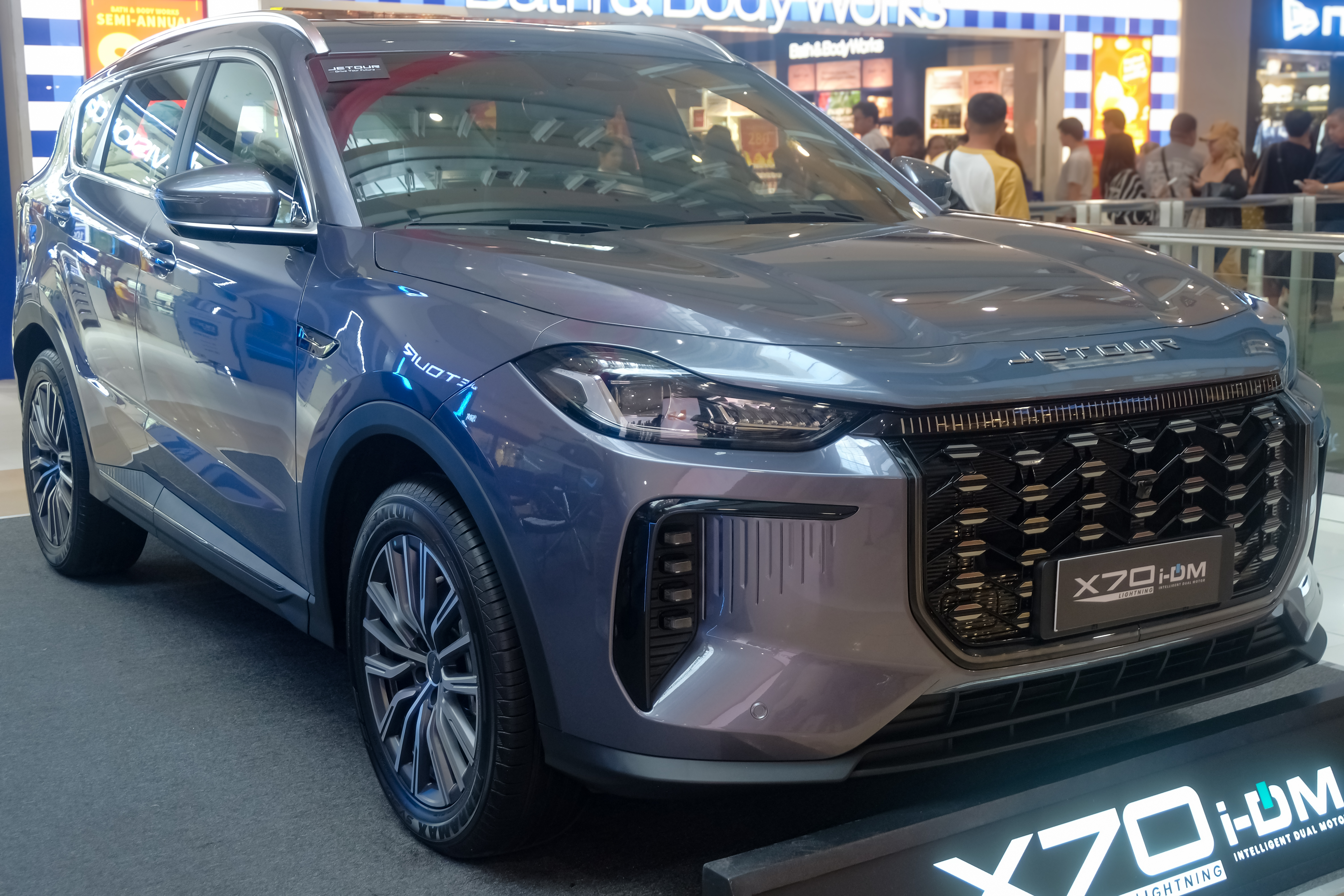
Jetour X70 Lightning i-DM in the Philippines

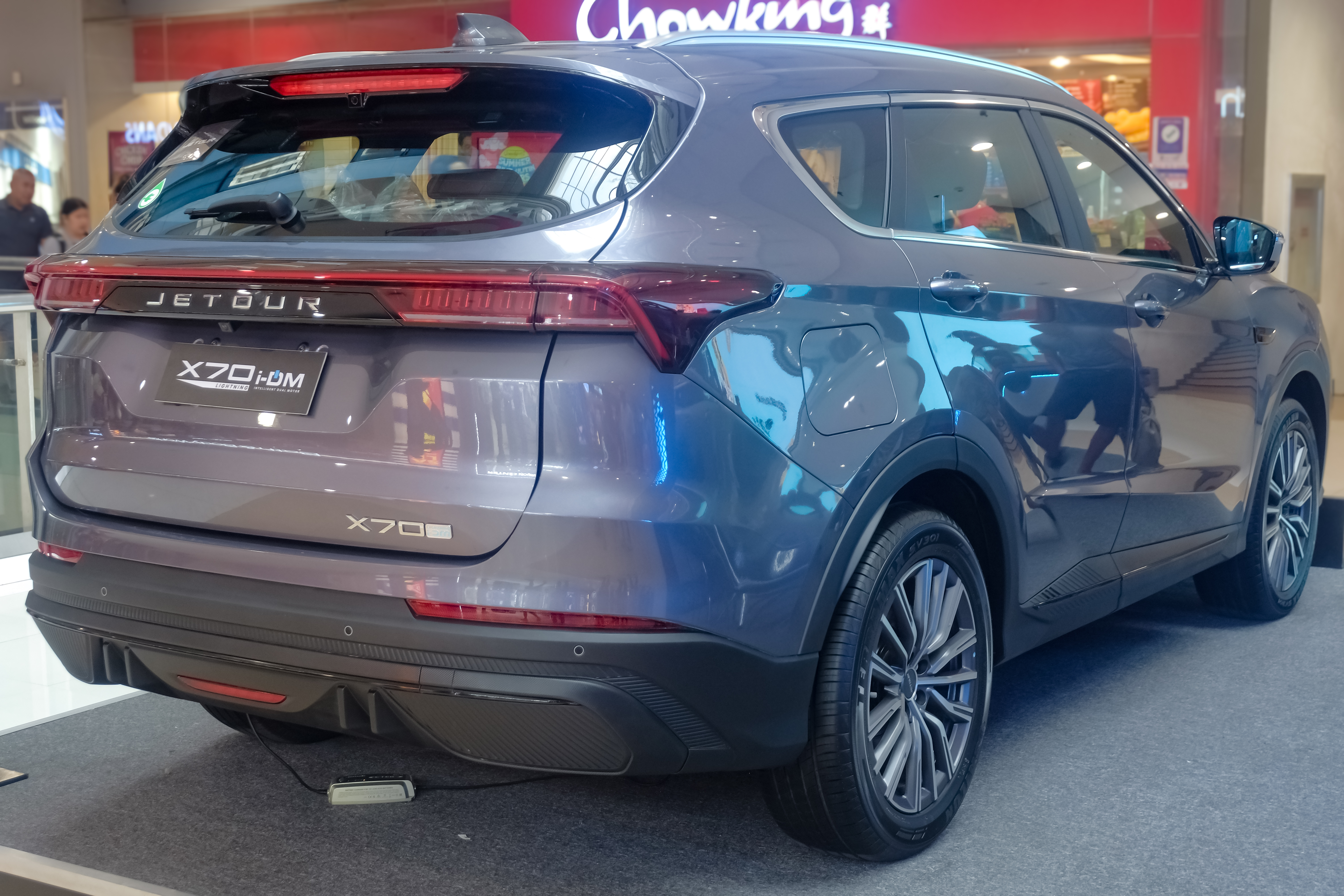
Rear

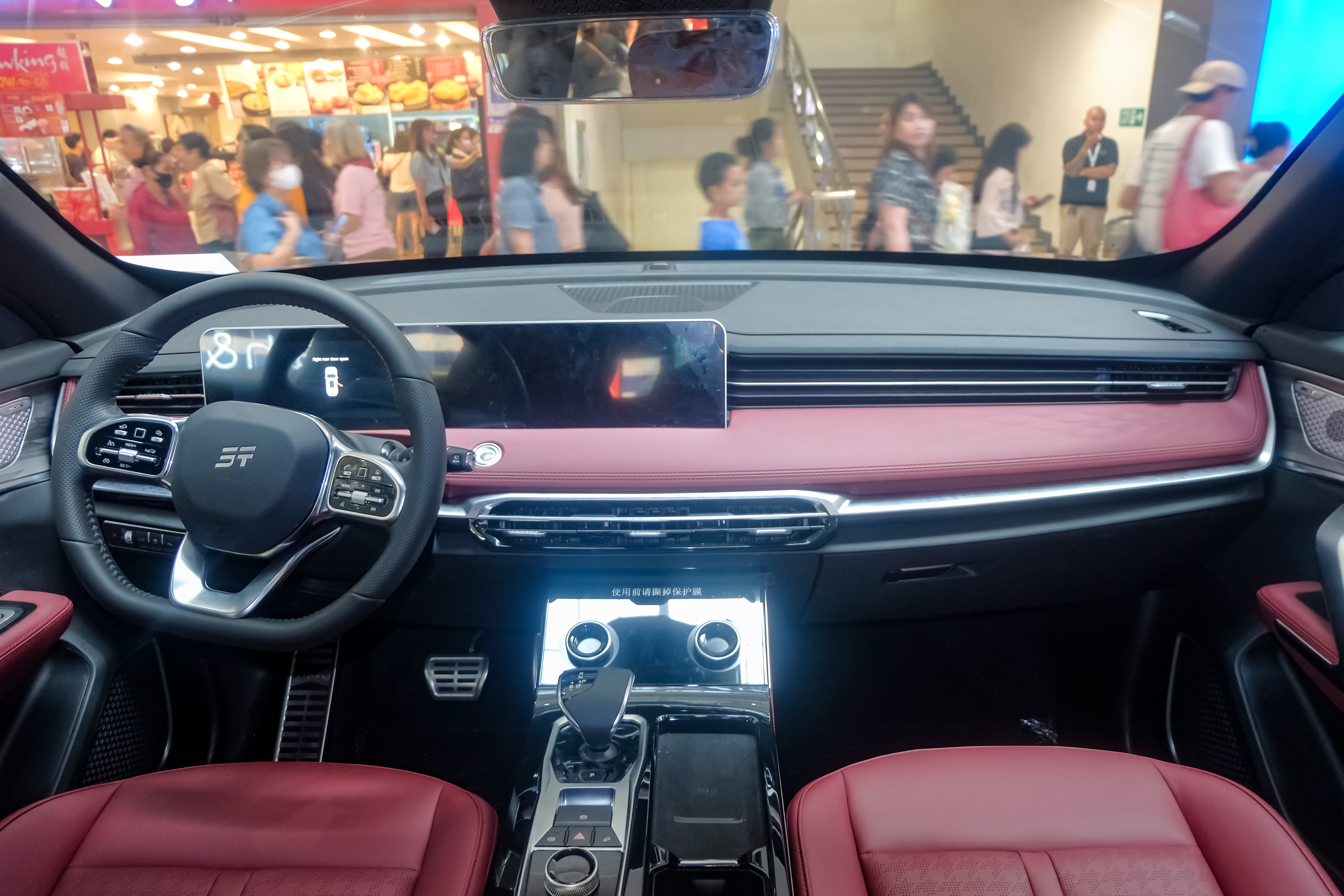
Interior

==== Russia ====
In Russia, apart from the Jetour X70 Plus, a variant was also sold under the Soueast brand as the Soueast S07 produced in Kaliningrad by Avtotor.

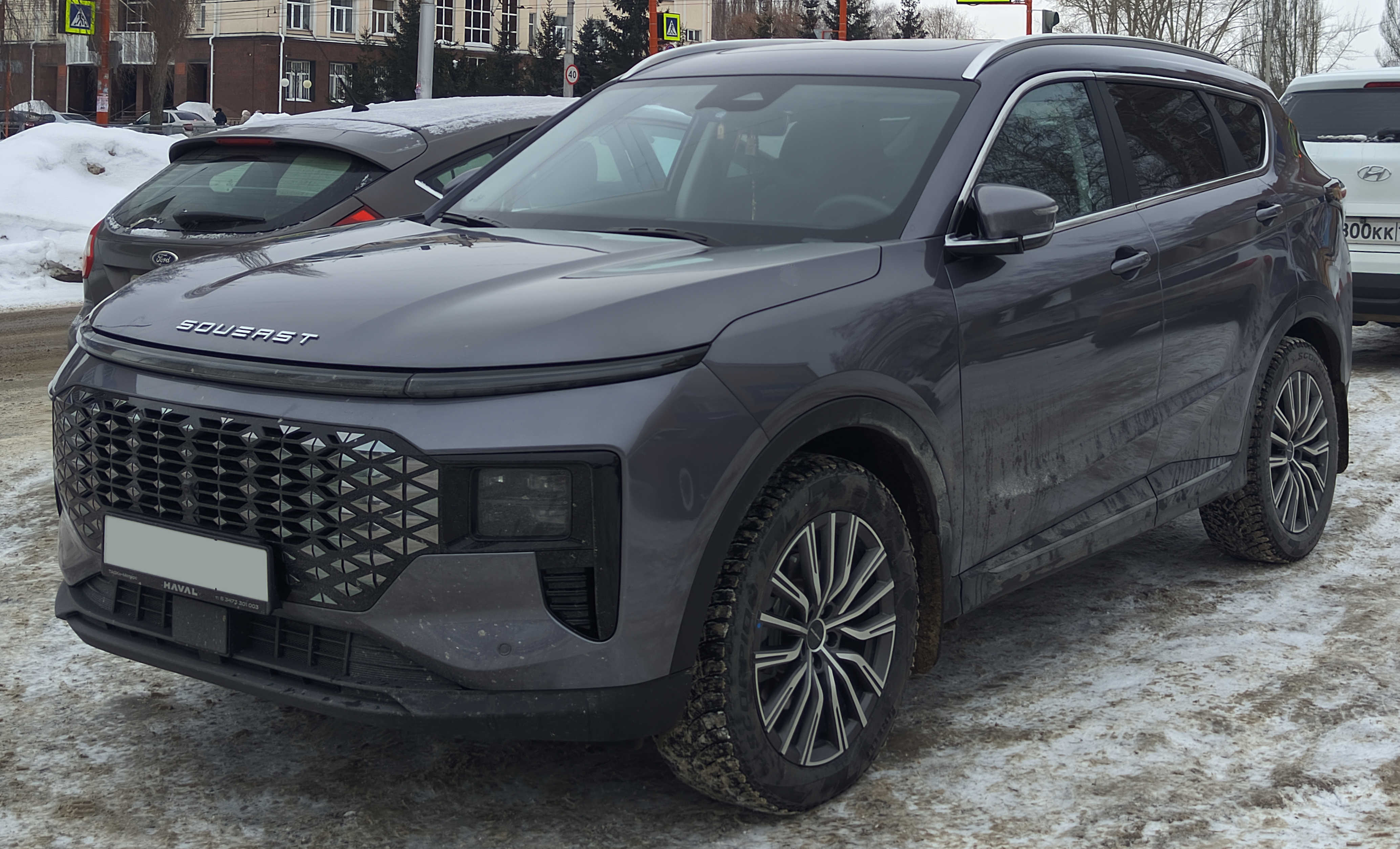
2024 Soueast S07

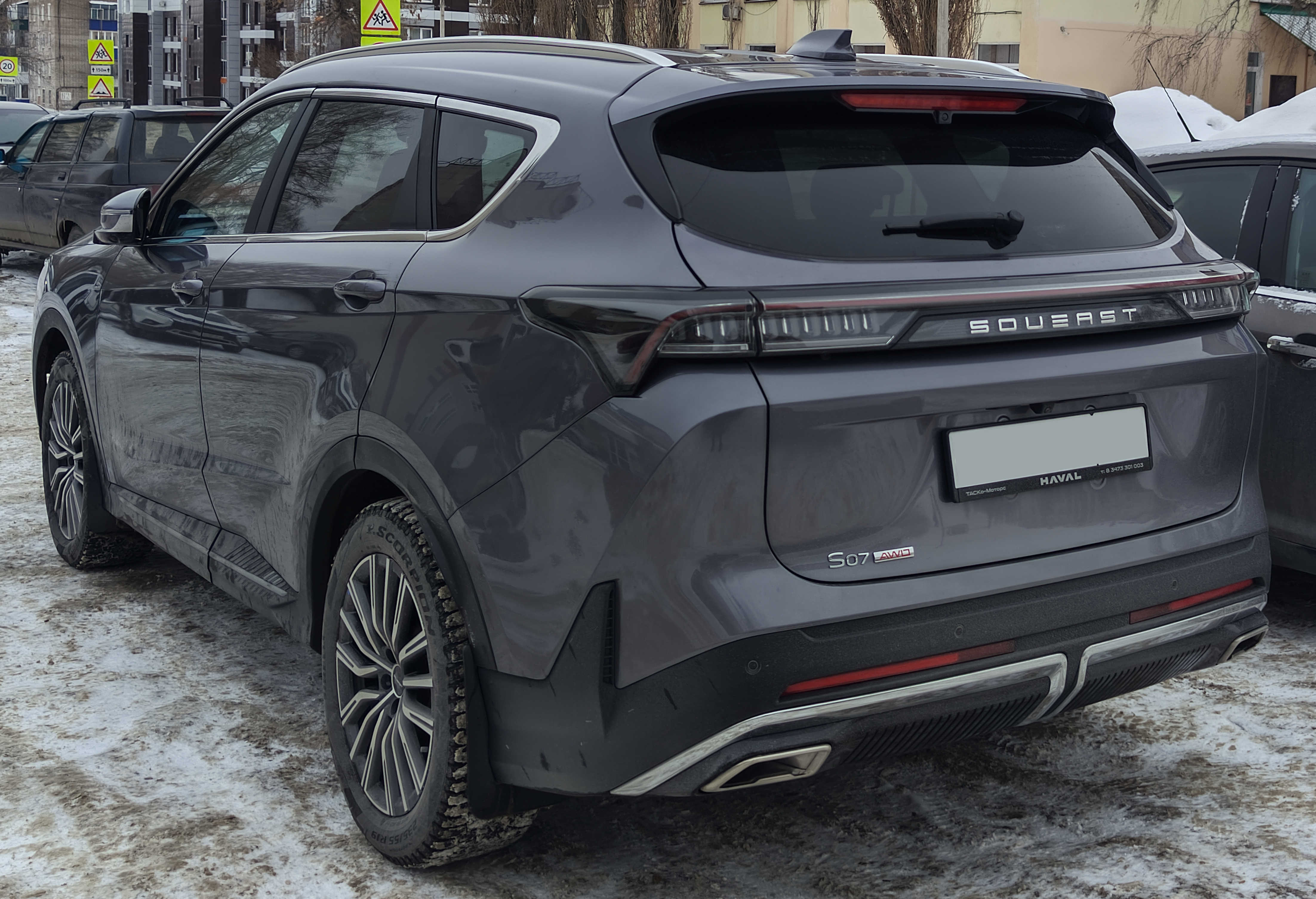
Rear

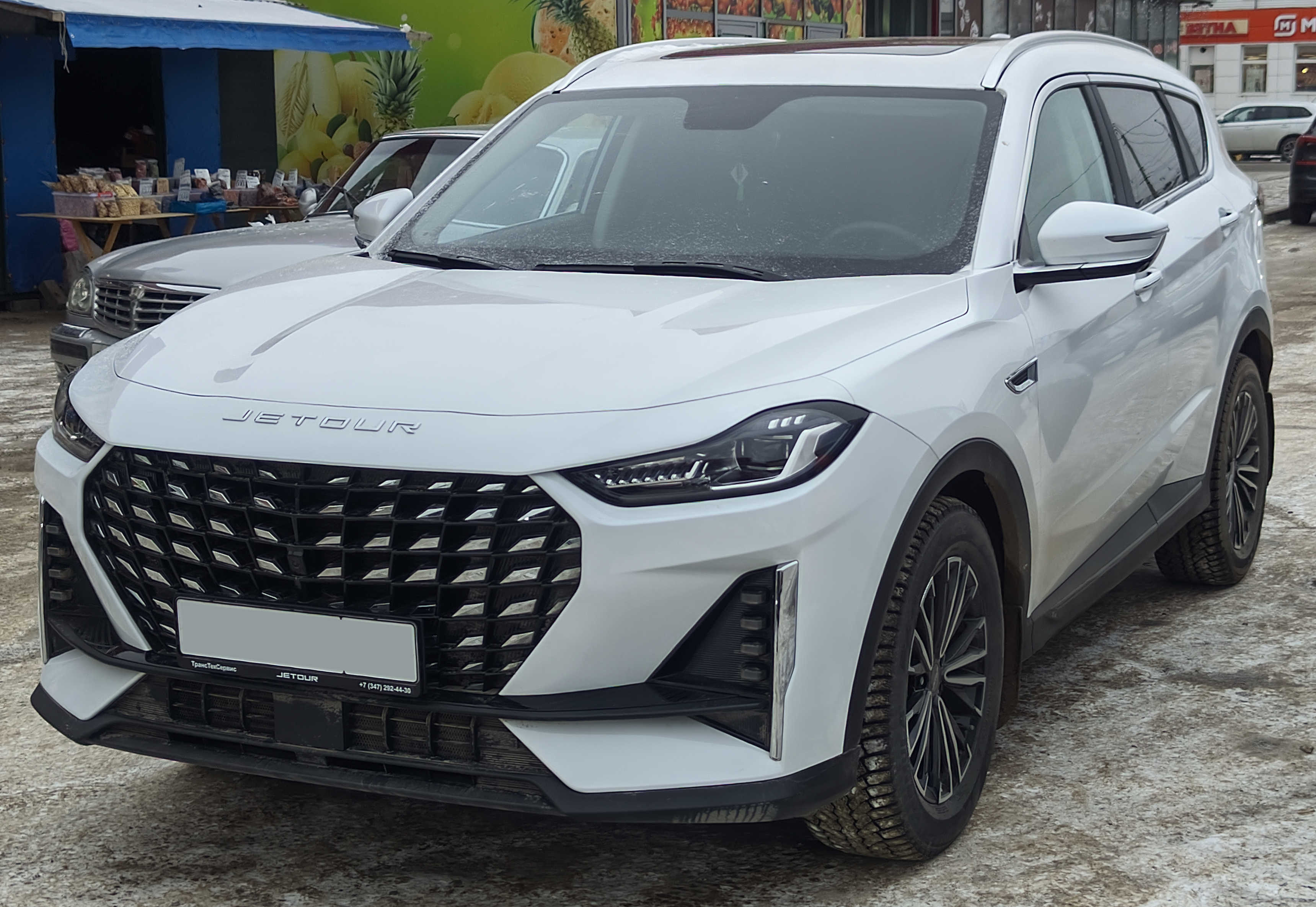
2025 Jetour X70 Plus

==== South Africa ====
The X70 Plus was launched in South Africa on 21 September 2024, alongside the Dashing as part of Jetour's entry to the market. It is available in two trim levels: Momentum and Deluxe, it is powered by a 1.5-litre turbocharged petrol engine.

== Sales ==
Year	China								Mexico	
Year	X70	X70 Plus	X70S	X70S EV	X70M	X70 C-DM	X70 Pro	Shanhai L7	X70	X70 Plus
2023	1,188	77,006	11,382	533	1,557	—	—	—	636	466
2024	23,852	80,988	5,947	83	17	2,185	4,183	6,192	995	799
2025	76,606	—	8,349	—	—	155	6	12,202	250	167
