= Soueast A5 =

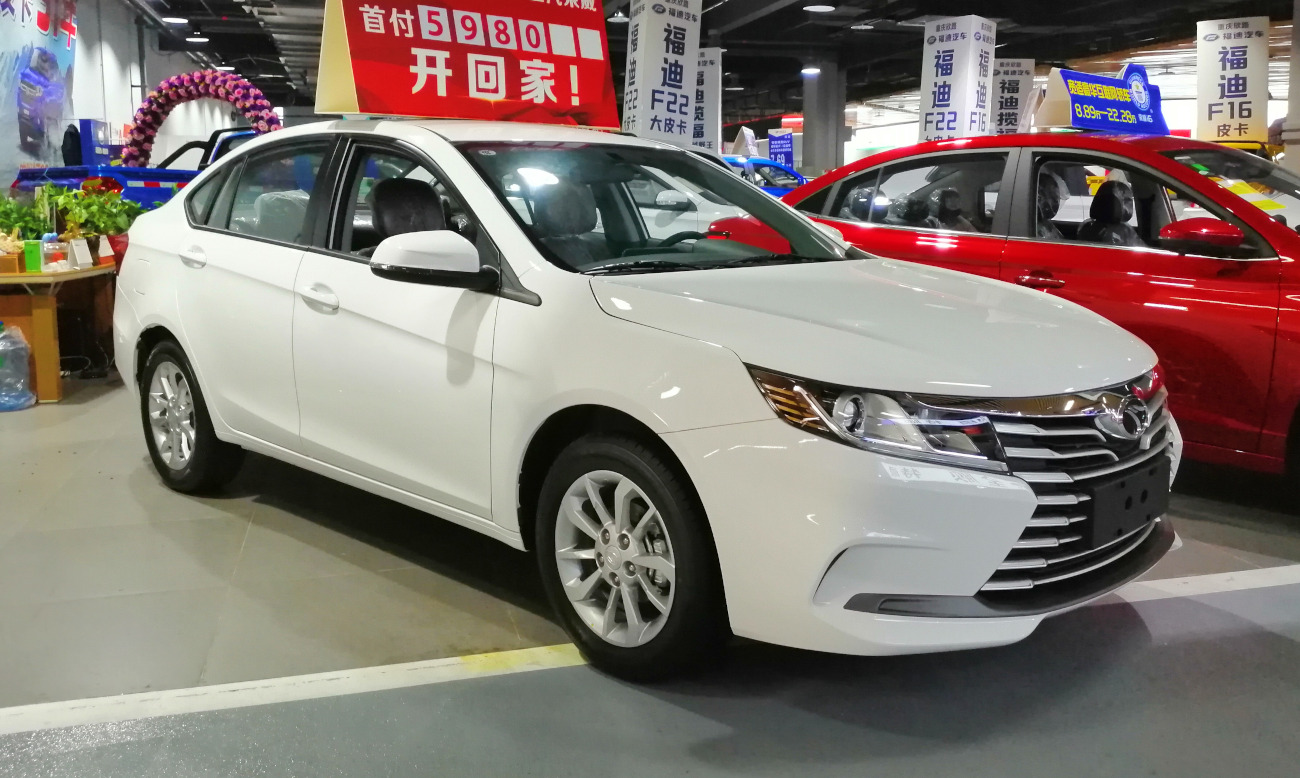

Overview
- Manufacturer: Soueast
- Production: 2018–2023
- Assembly: China: Fuzhou (Soueast)

Body and chassis
- Body style: 4-door sedan
- Layout: Front-engine, front-wheel-drive
- Related: Soueast V5 Lingzhi

Powertrain
- Engine: 1.5 L 4A91 I4 (petrol)
- Transmission: 5-speed manual CVT

Dimensions
- Wheelbase: 2,625 mm (103.3 in)
- Length: 4,588 mm (180.6 in)
- Width: 1,780 mm (70.1 in)
- Height: 1,485 mm (58.5 in)

The Soueast A5 Yiwu (Chinese: 翼舞) is a compact sedan produced by Chinese manufacturer Soueast Motors from 2018 to 2023 to replace the Soueast V5 Lingzhi.

== Overview ==
The A5 Yiwu was first launched during the 2018 Chengdu Auto Show in August 2018, with the production version of the A5 Yiwu launched in Q4 2018 being heavily based on its predecessor, the Soueast V5 Lingzhi sedan.

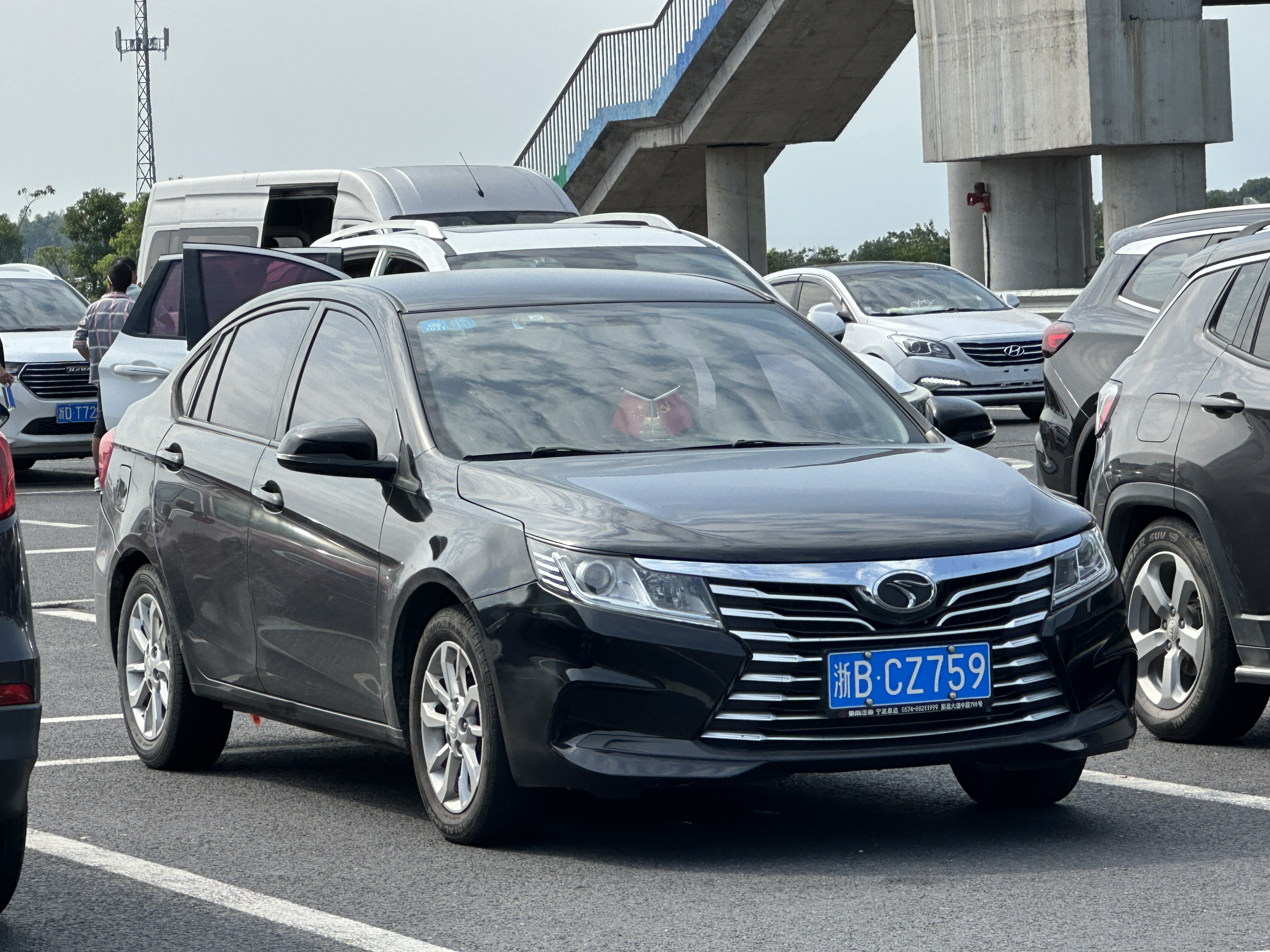
Soueast A5 Yiwu

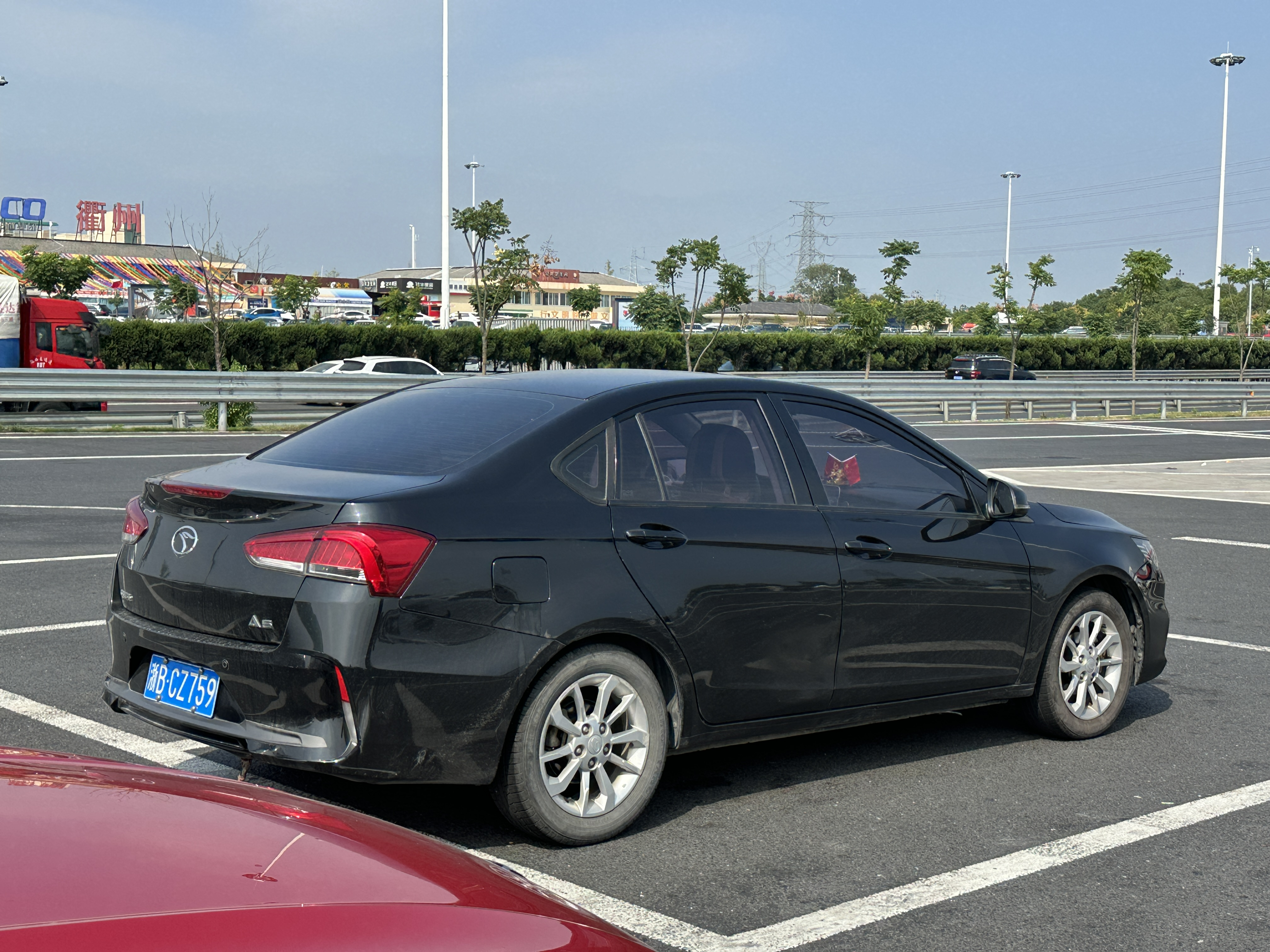
Soueast A5 Yiwu rear view

=== Powertrain ===
The A5 Yiwu is powered by a Mitsubishi-sourced 1.5 liter engine developing 120 hp and 143.0N· m and mated to a 5-speed manual transmission.

== See also ==
- Soueast V5 Lingzhi
