= Soueast =

Chinese automobile manufacturing company

South East (Fujian) Motor Co., Ltd.
- Trade name: Soueast
- Type: Subsidiary
- Industry: Automotive
- Founded: 1995; 31 years ago
- Headquarters: Fuzhou, Fujian, China
- Area served: Worldwide
- Key people: Zi-Sheng Zuo (President)
- Products: Automobiles
- Owner: Chery (100%)

Chinese name
- Simplified Chinese: 东南(福建)汽车工业有限公司
- Traditional Chinese: 東南(福建)汽車工業有限公司
Transcriptions
Standard Mandarin
- Hanyu Pinyin: Dōngnán (Fújiàn) Qìchē Gōngyè Yǒuxiàn Gōngsī
- Website: www.soueast-motor.com

South East (Fujian) Motor Co., Ltd., trading as Soueast, is a Chinese automobile manufacturer based in Fuzhou, Fujian, a subsidiary of Chery. It conducts production and sale of passenger vehicles under the Soueast marque.

It used to manufacture Mitsubishi brand passenger cars for sale in mainland China, a joint venture between China Motor Corporation (25%), Fujian Motor Industry Group (50%) and Mitsubishi Motors (25%), before Mitsubishi's exit in 2021 and acquisition by Chery in 2024.

The name "Soueast" merges "South" and "East" (from China's southeast Fujian Province), symbolizing its history and culture. Now, it also stands for "Soul Ease" – promoting an ease lifestyle.

== History ==
Before 2024

Soueast was founded in November 1995 as a joint venture between China Motor Corporation and Fujian Motor Industry Group. Mitsubishi became a partner in the joint venture in 2006.

In April 2008, Soueast was awarded a contract to supply 5,700 Delica minibuses to the Iranian Mehreghan Co. In the same year, Jackie Chan was signed on as a Mitsubishi brand ambassador for Mainland China markets.

As of early 2011, Soueast had an annual production capacity of around 180,000 units, which rose to 300,000 with the completion of construction that may have finished by early 2012. (Note: Production capacity figures may consider engines and vehicles as discrete.)

Soueast Motor reached its sales peak in 2017, selling 150,000 units that year.

In May 2021, Mitsubishi announced its withdrawal from Southeast Motor, ending 26 years cooperation.

The company was acquired by Chery in 2024 and is currently producing Jetour vehicles.

Present

On April 29, 2024, Soueast Motor held a Global Investment Promotion Conference in Fuzhou, Fujian, showcasing its upcoming product lineup and announcing the restart of its global operations.

On September 28, 2024, the new Soueast Motor made its global debut in Tashkent, Uzbekistan, unveiling two new models: the S09 and S07.

In January 2025, Soueast unveiled the new brand concept in three countries - Kuwait, UAE and Qatar - and unveiled its third SUV, the S06.

== Products ==
=== Current models ===
- Soueast S05 (2025–present), Subcompact SUV
- Soueast S06 (2025–present), compact SUV, rebadged Jetour Dashing
- Soueast S07 (2024–present), mid-size SUV, rebadged Jetour X70 Plus
- Soueast S08 (upcoming), mid-size SUV, rebadged Jetour X70L
- Soueast S09 (2024–present), mid-size SUV, rebadged Jetour Shanhai L9
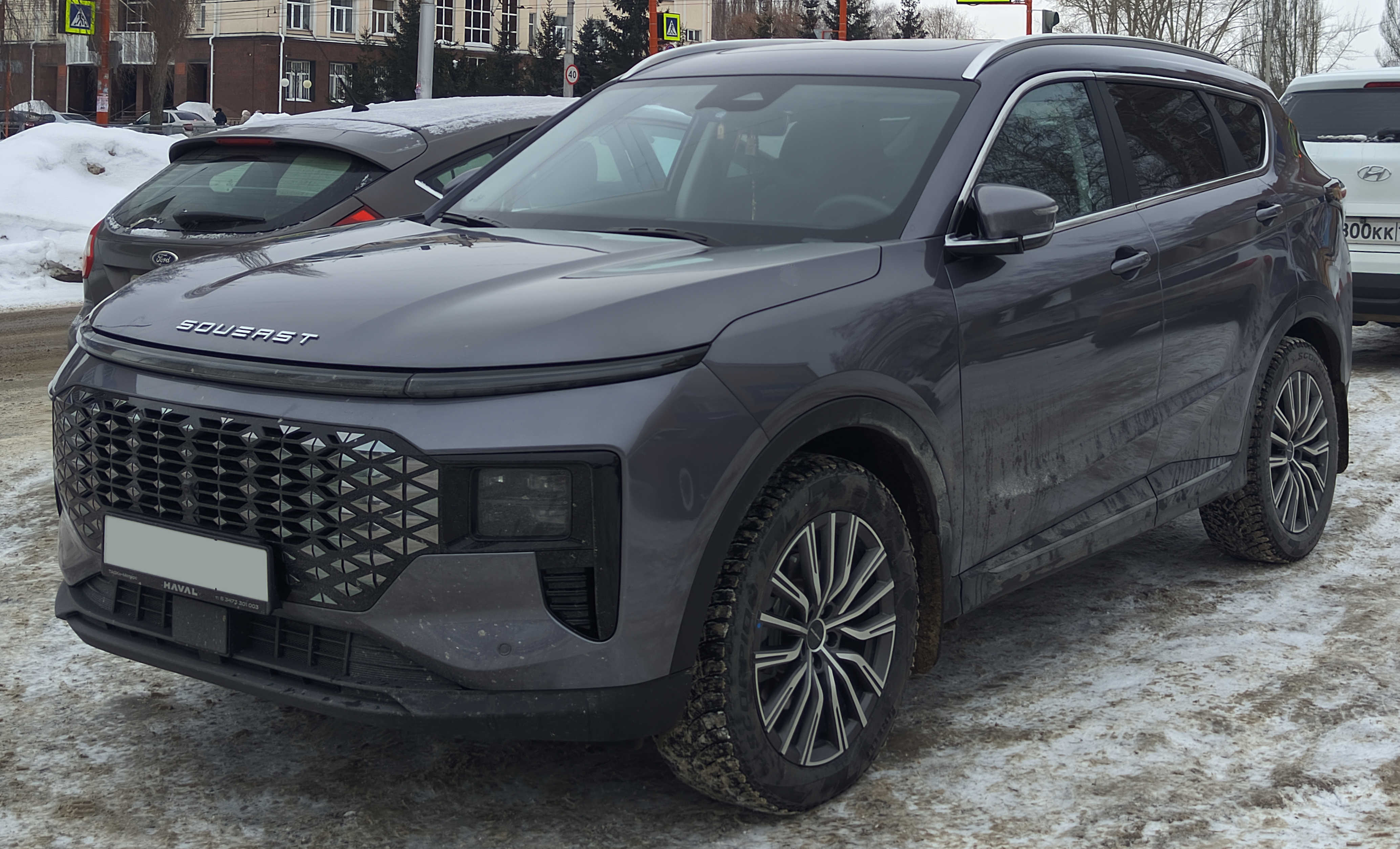
Soueast S07

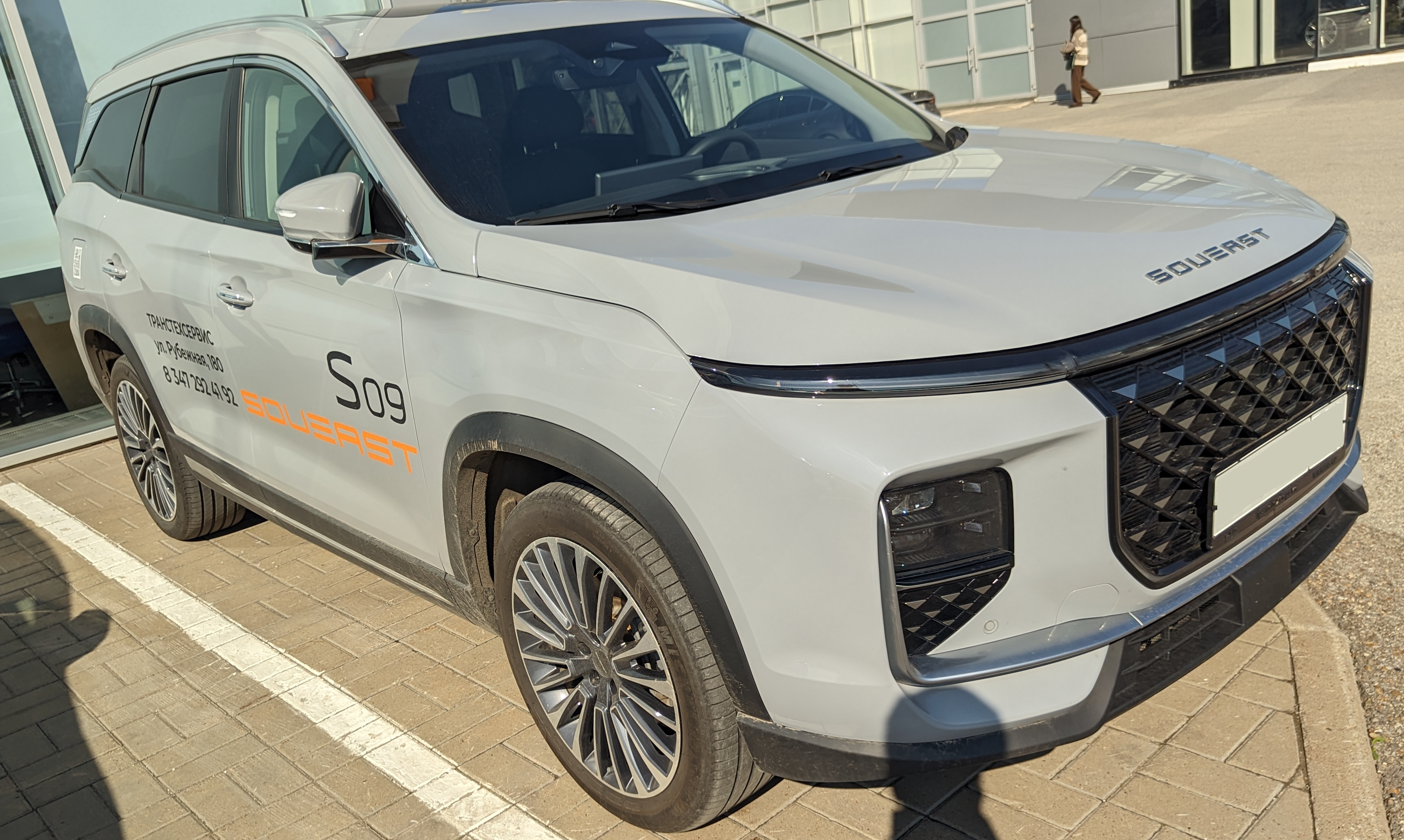
Soueast S09

=== Discontinued models ===
- Soueast Veryca microvan (2008–2011)
- Soueast C1 Xiwang microvan (2011–2020)
- Soueast Delica minibus (1996–2013)
- Soueast Freeca (2001–2007)
- Soueast Sovereign (2004–2007)
- Soueast Lioncel (2003–2005)
- Soueast V3 Lingyue sedan (2008–2019)
- Soueast V5 Lingzhi sedan (2012–2020)
- Soueast V6 Lingshi hatchback (2013–2020)
- Soueast A5 Yiwu (2019–2023)
- Soueast DX3 (2016–2023)
- Soueast DX5 (2019–2023)
- Soueast DX7 Bolang SUV (2015–2023)
- Soueast DX8 (2018–2023)
- Soueast DX9 (2020)
- SEM Delica / Soueast EV500, rebadged King Long Kairui (2018–2023)
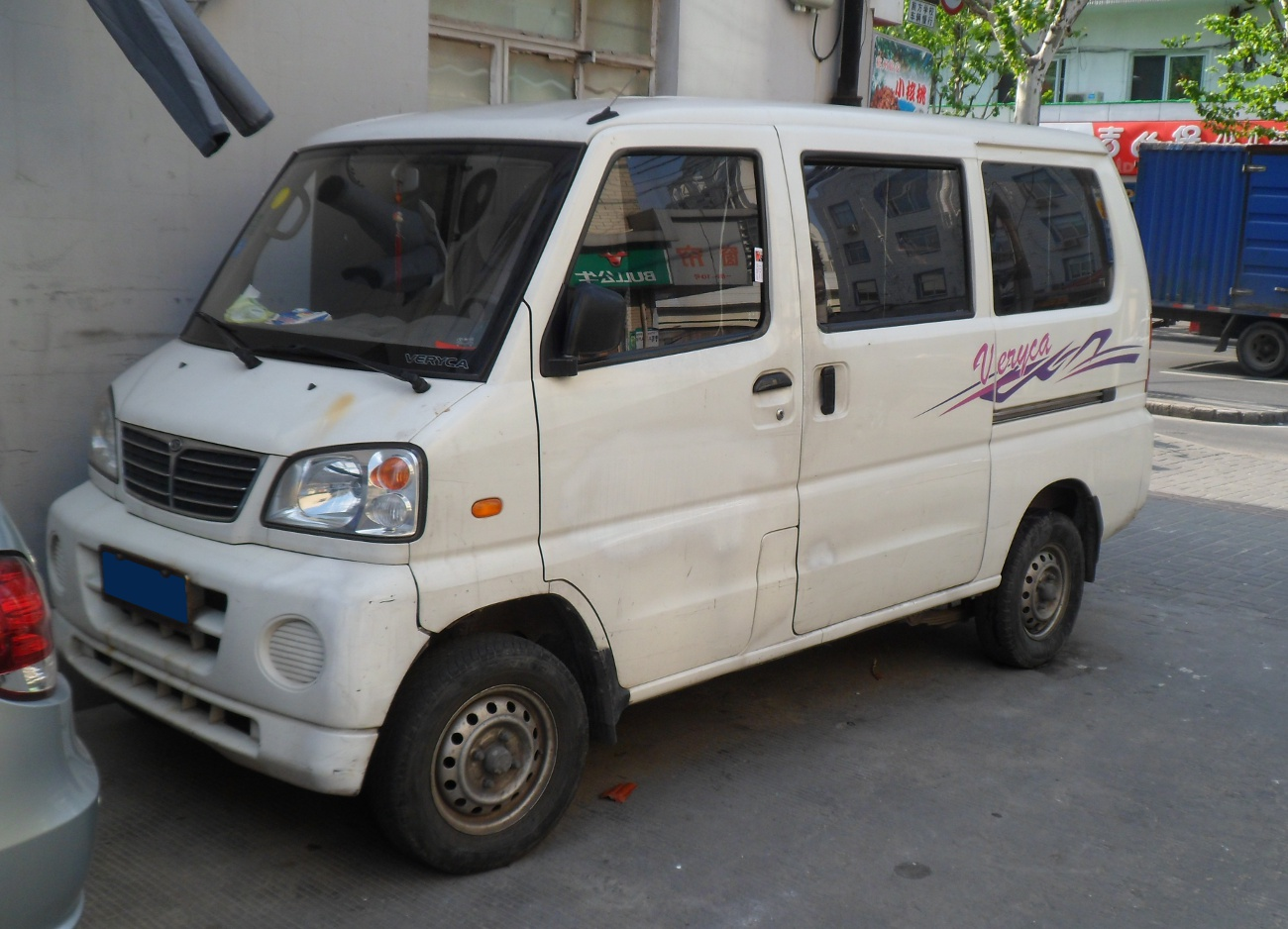
Soueast Veryca

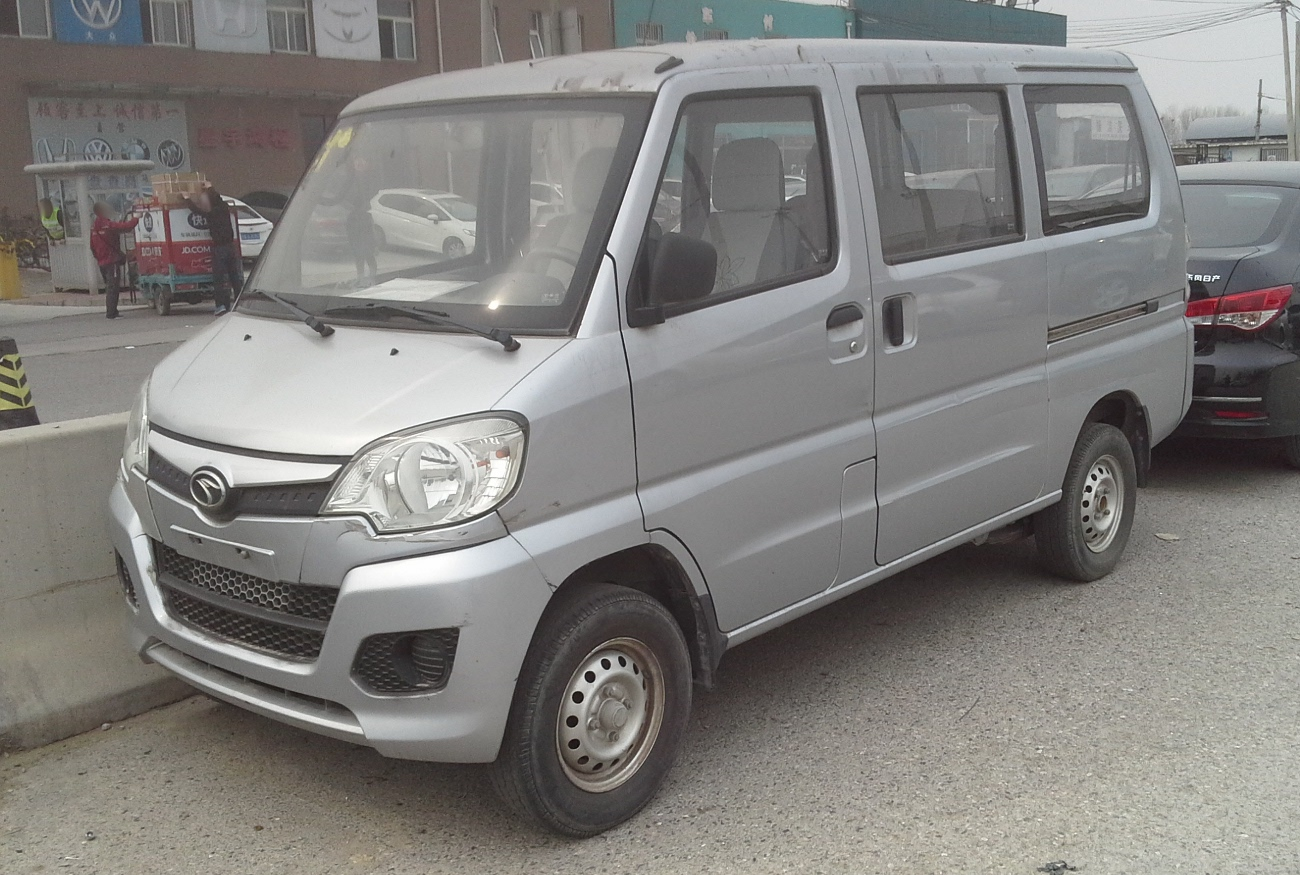
Soueast C1 Xiwang

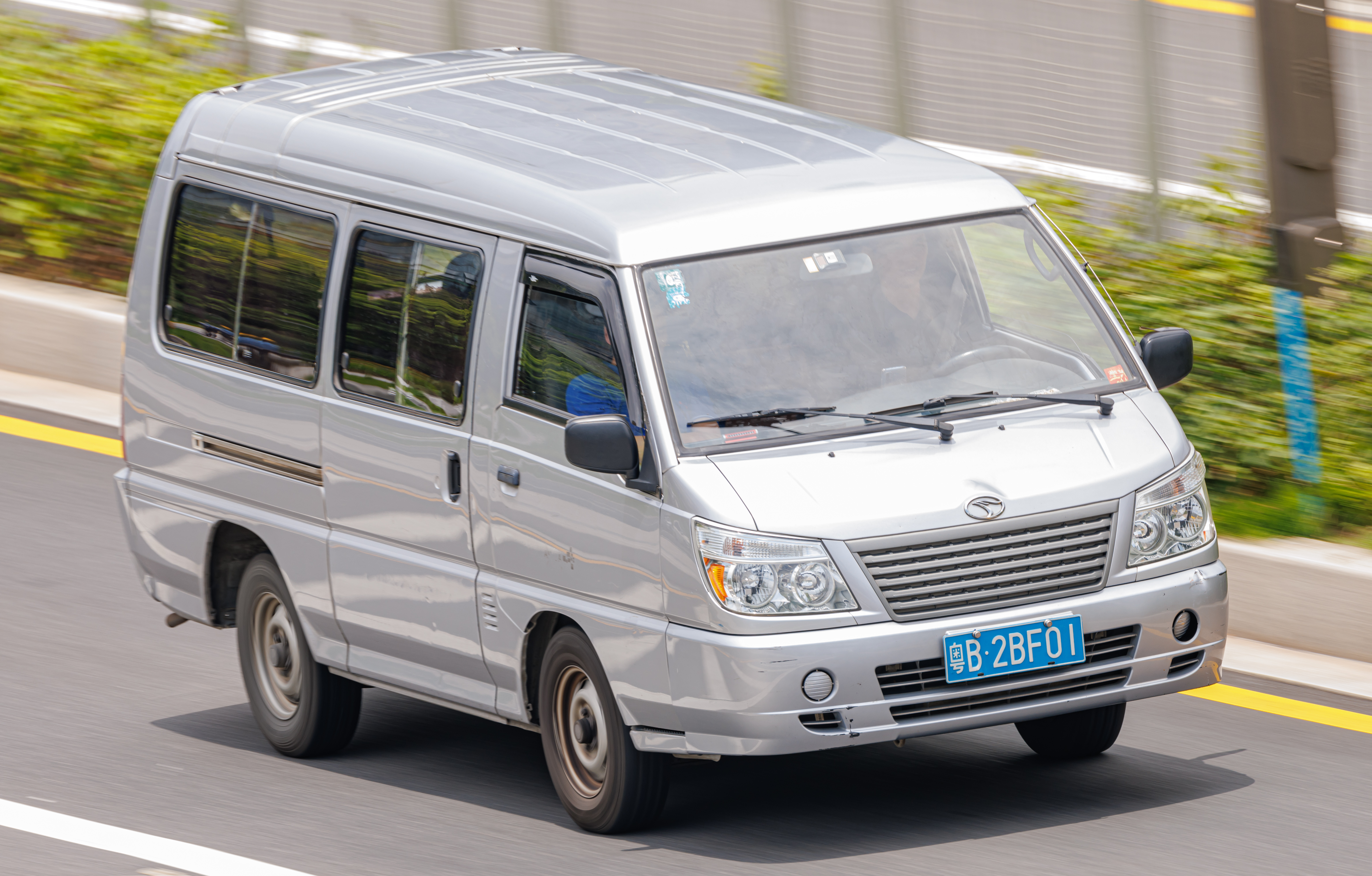
Soueast Delica

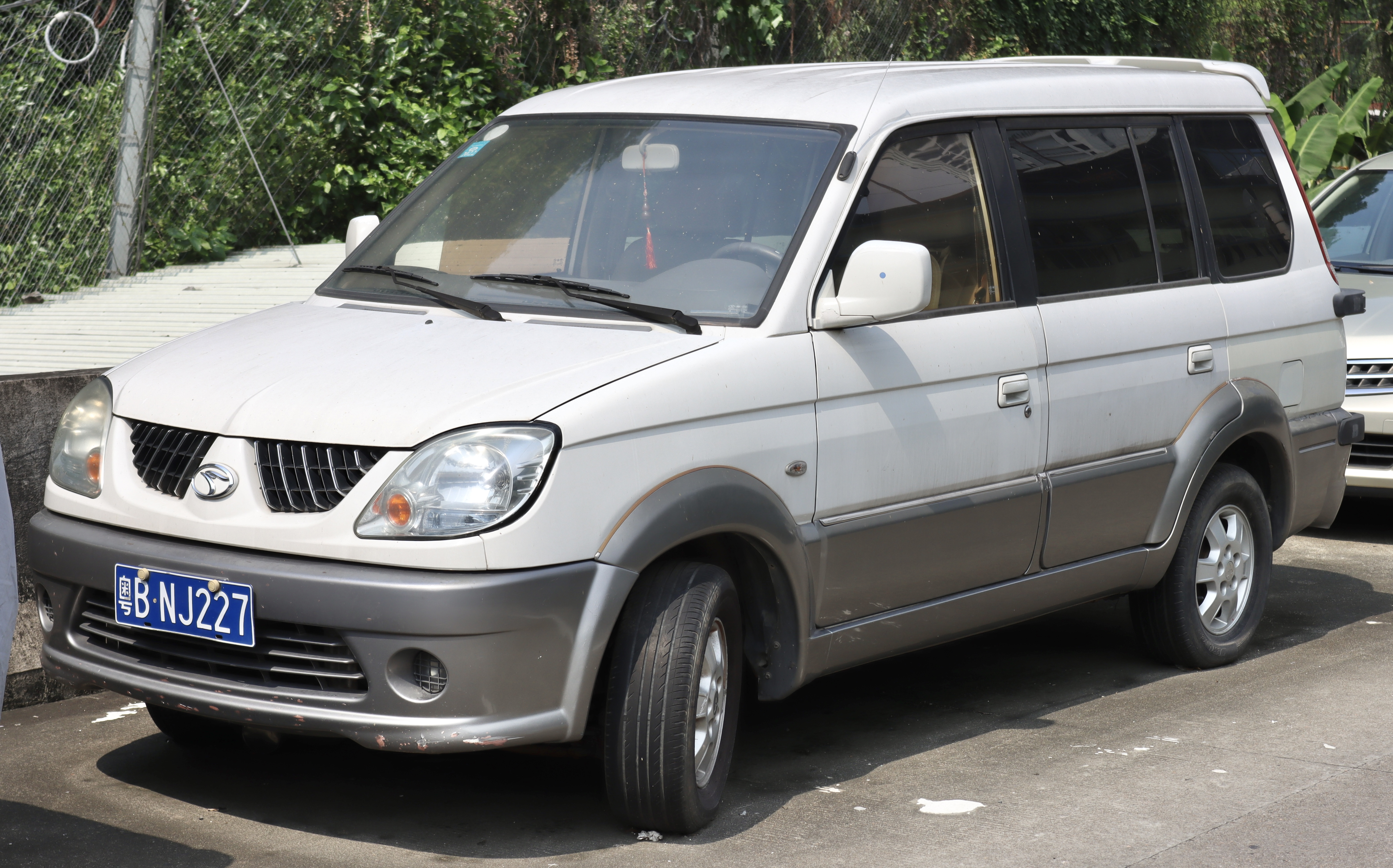
Soueast Freeca

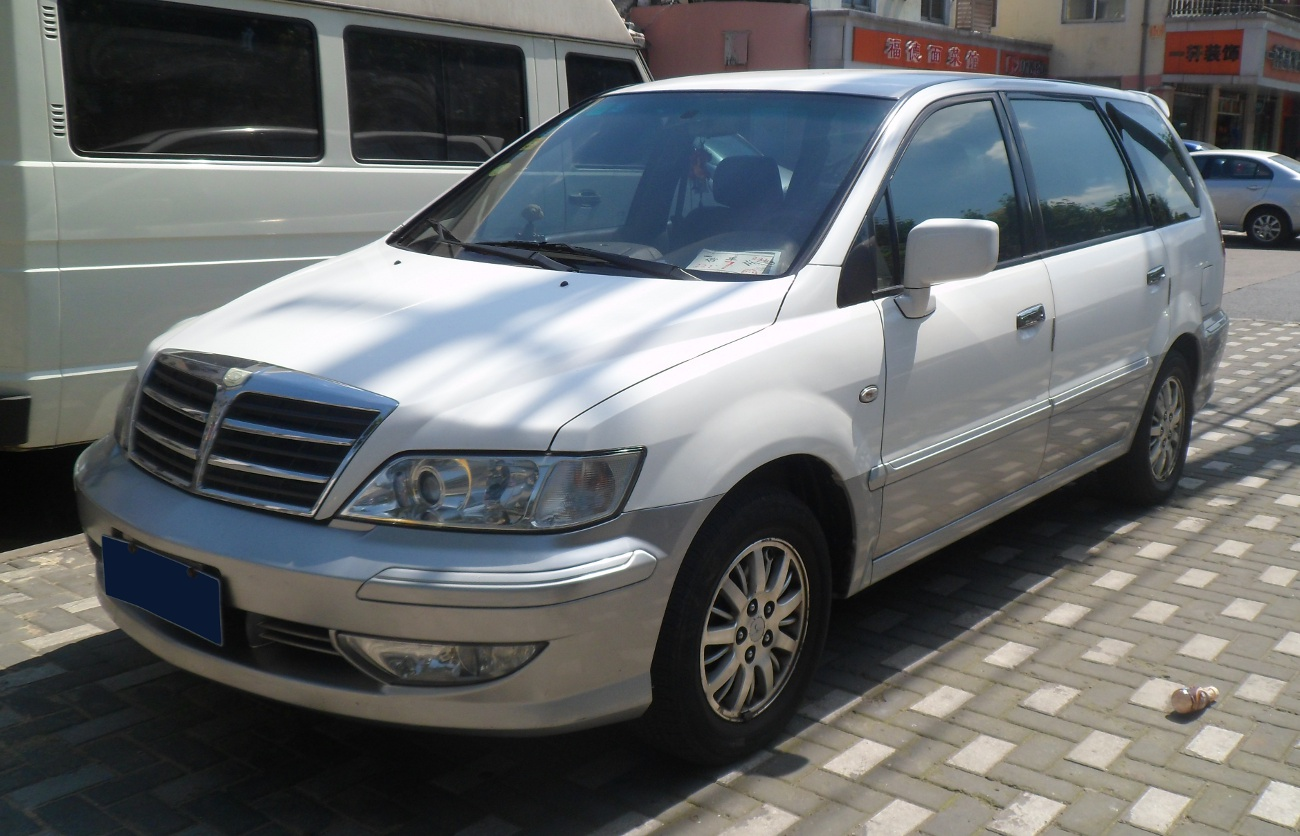
Soueast Sovereign

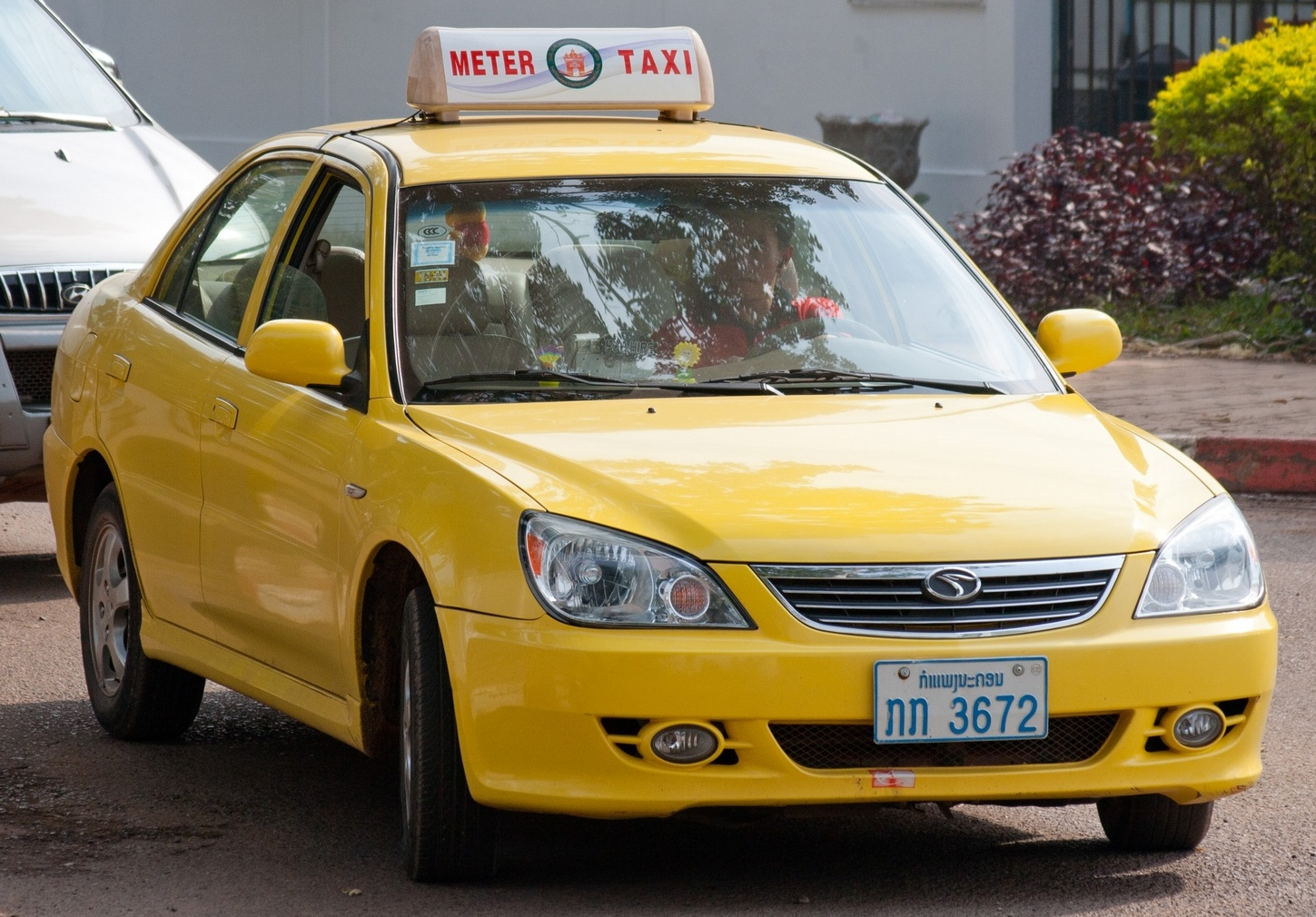
Soueast Lioncel

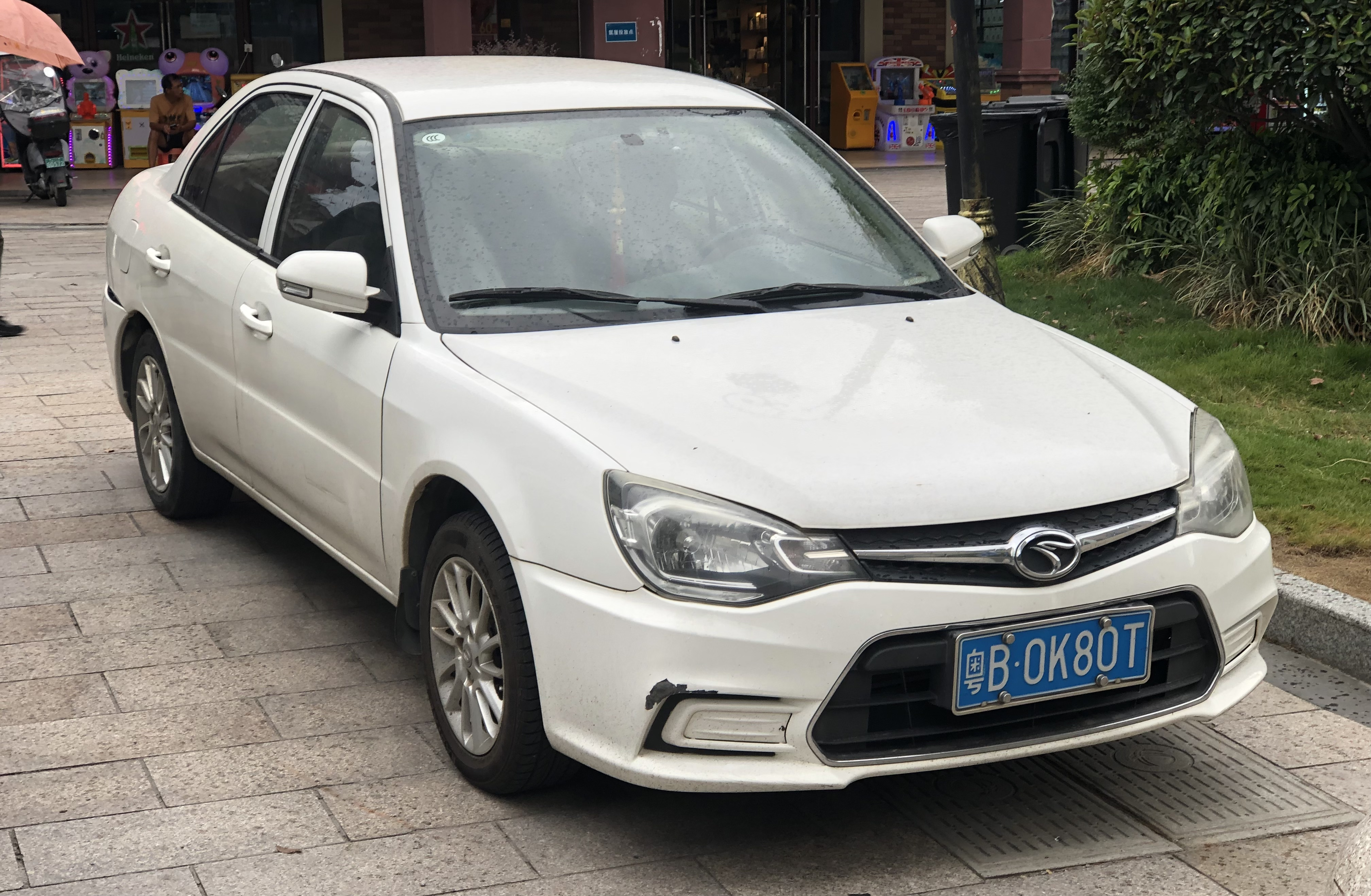
Soueast V3

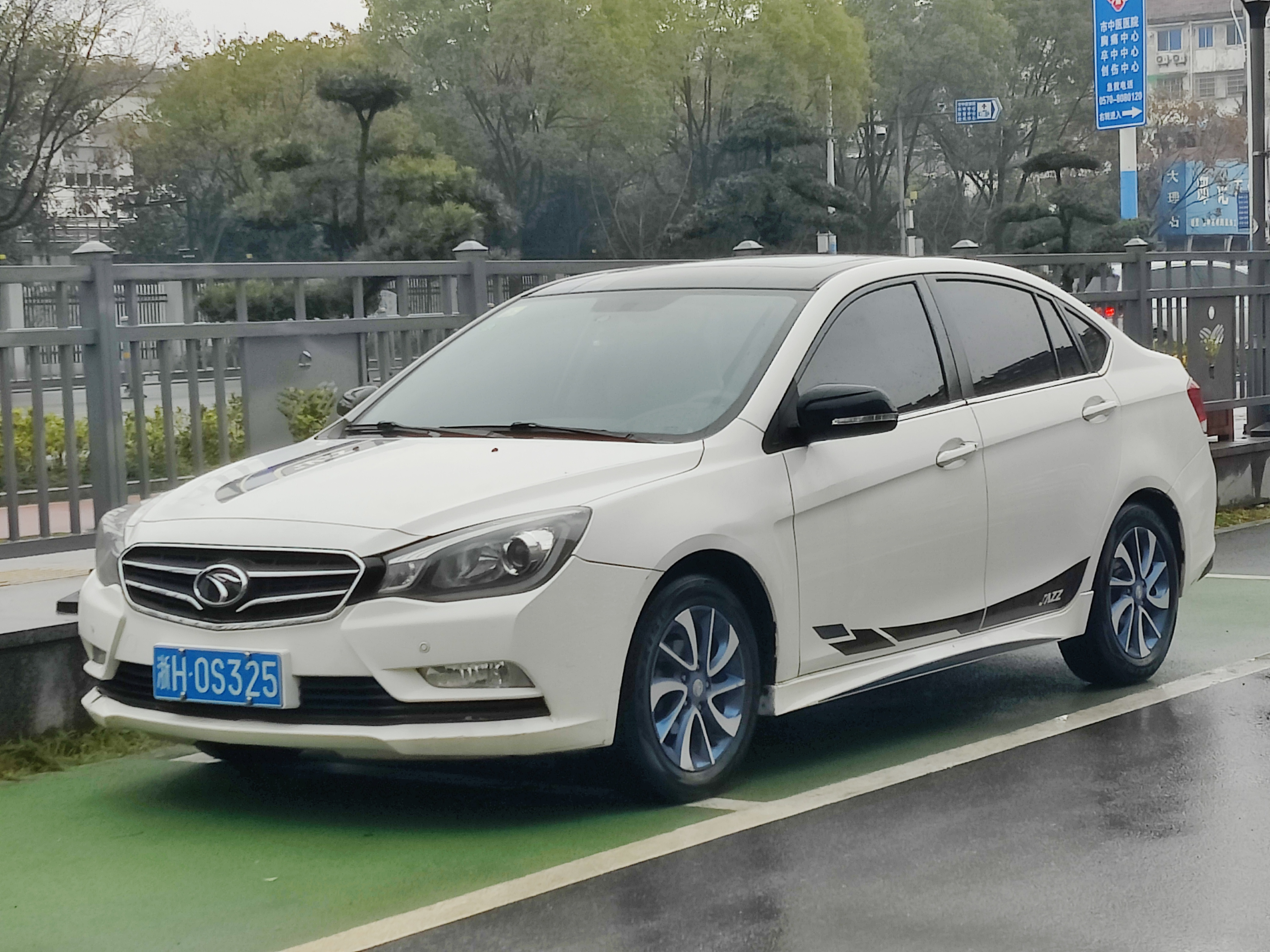
Soueast V5

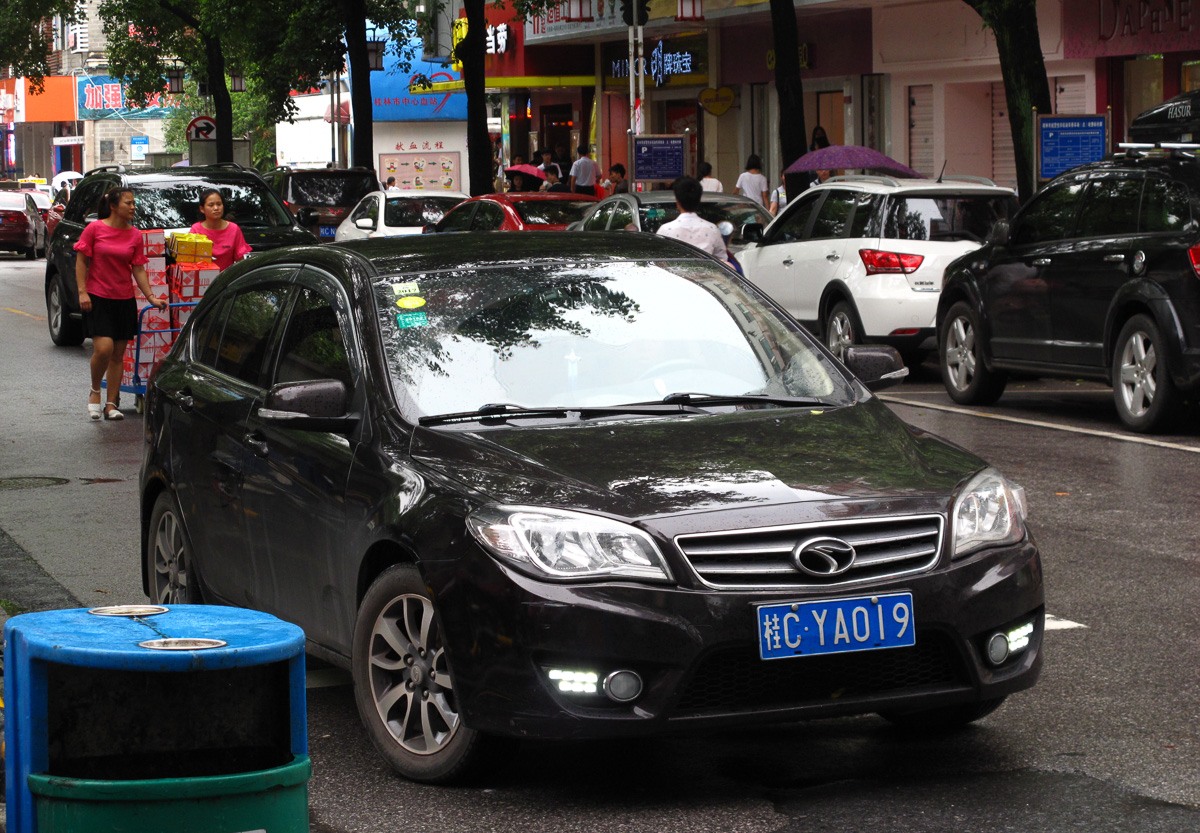
Soueast V6

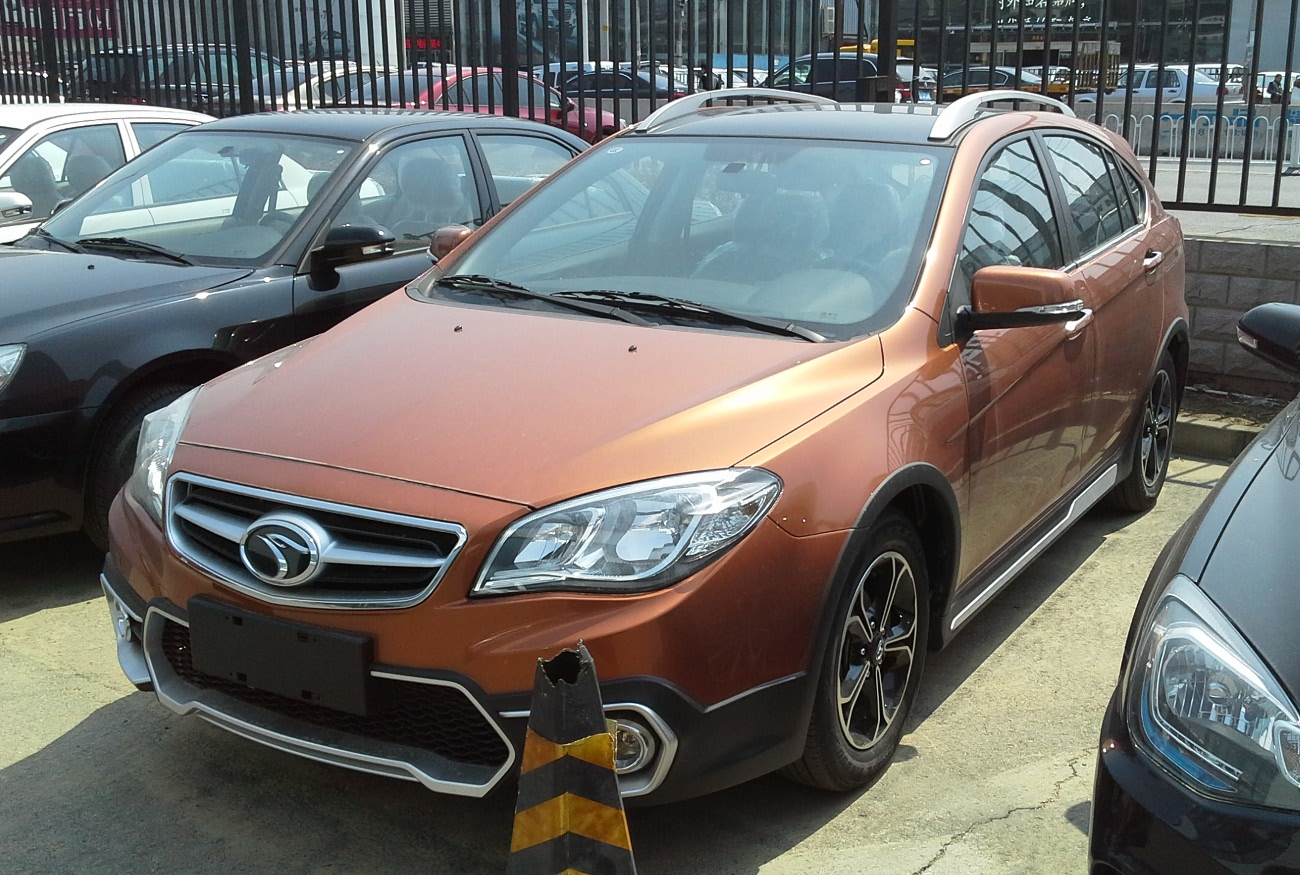
Soueast V6 Cross

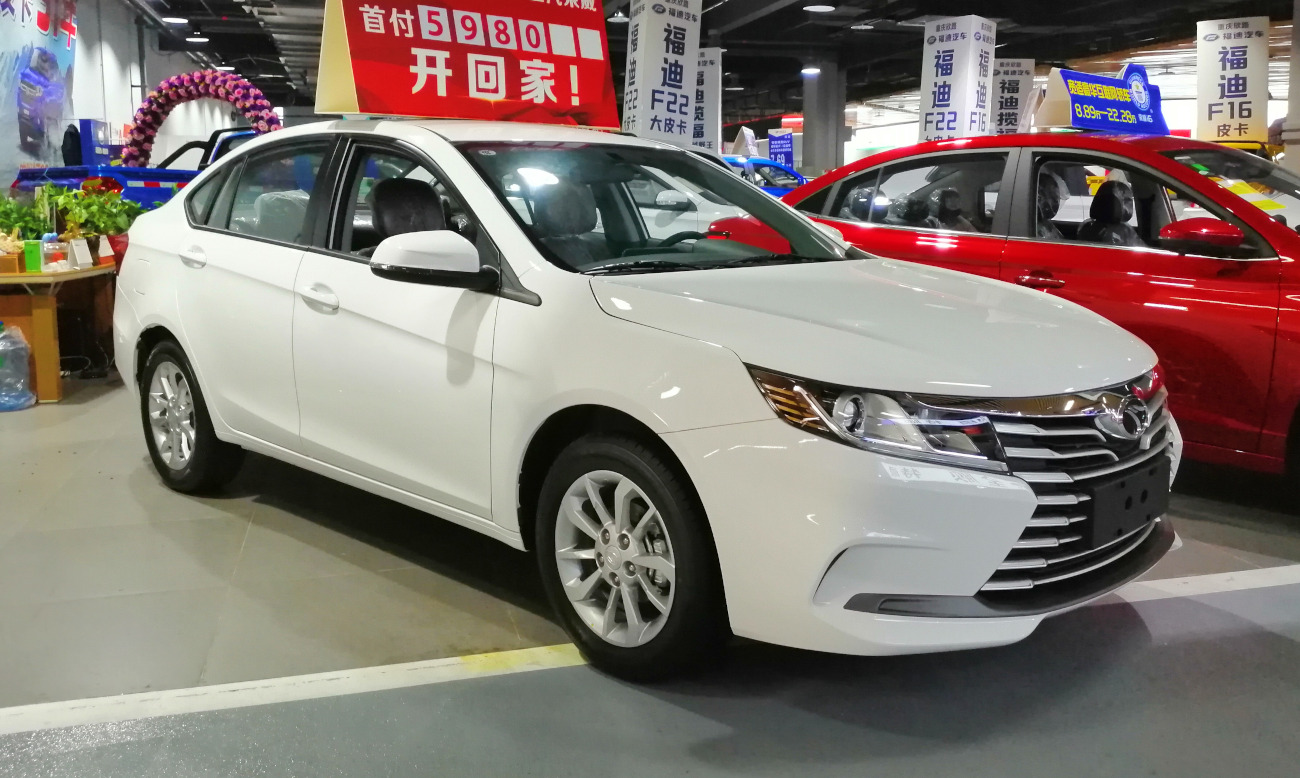
Soueast A5

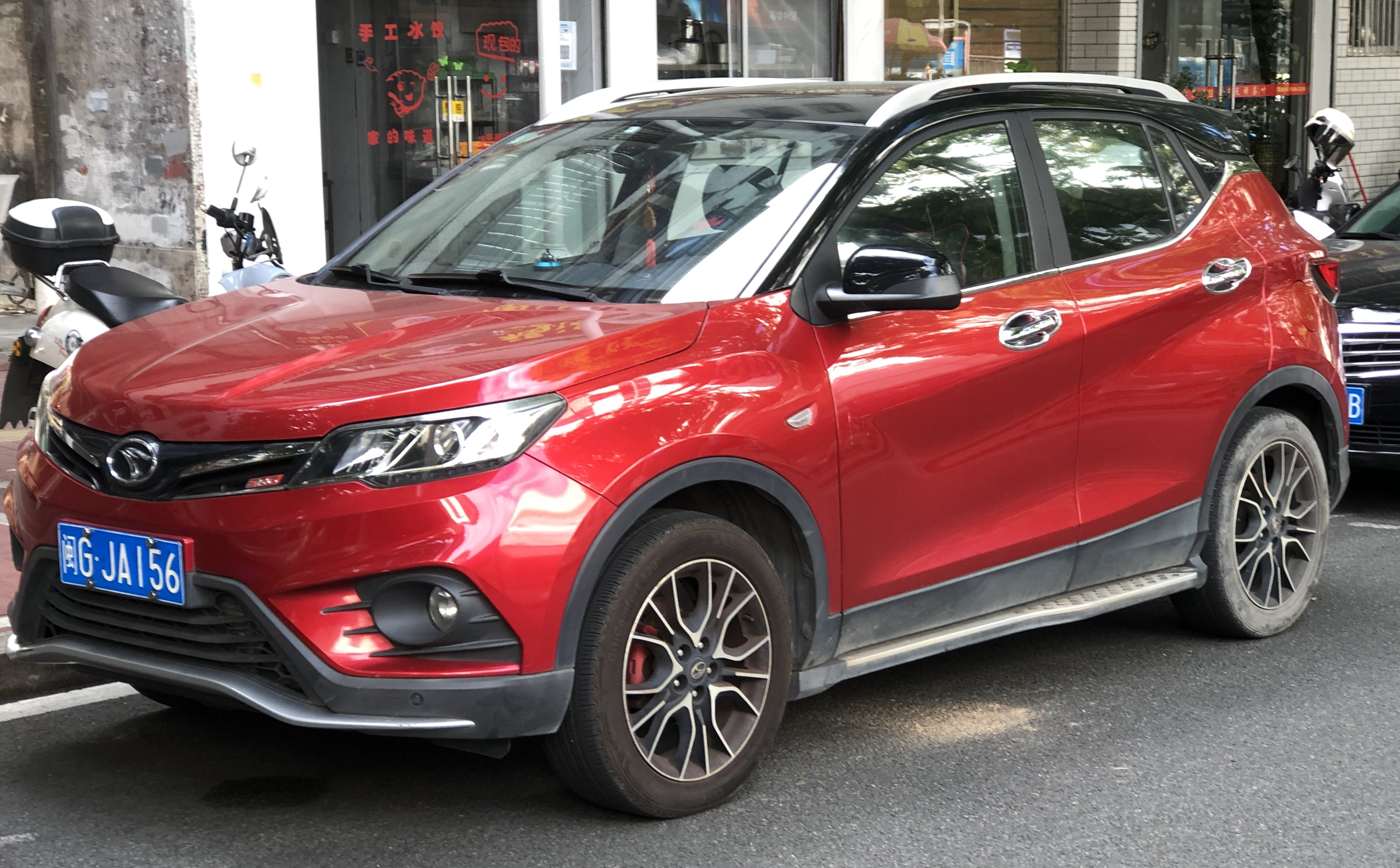
Soueast DX3

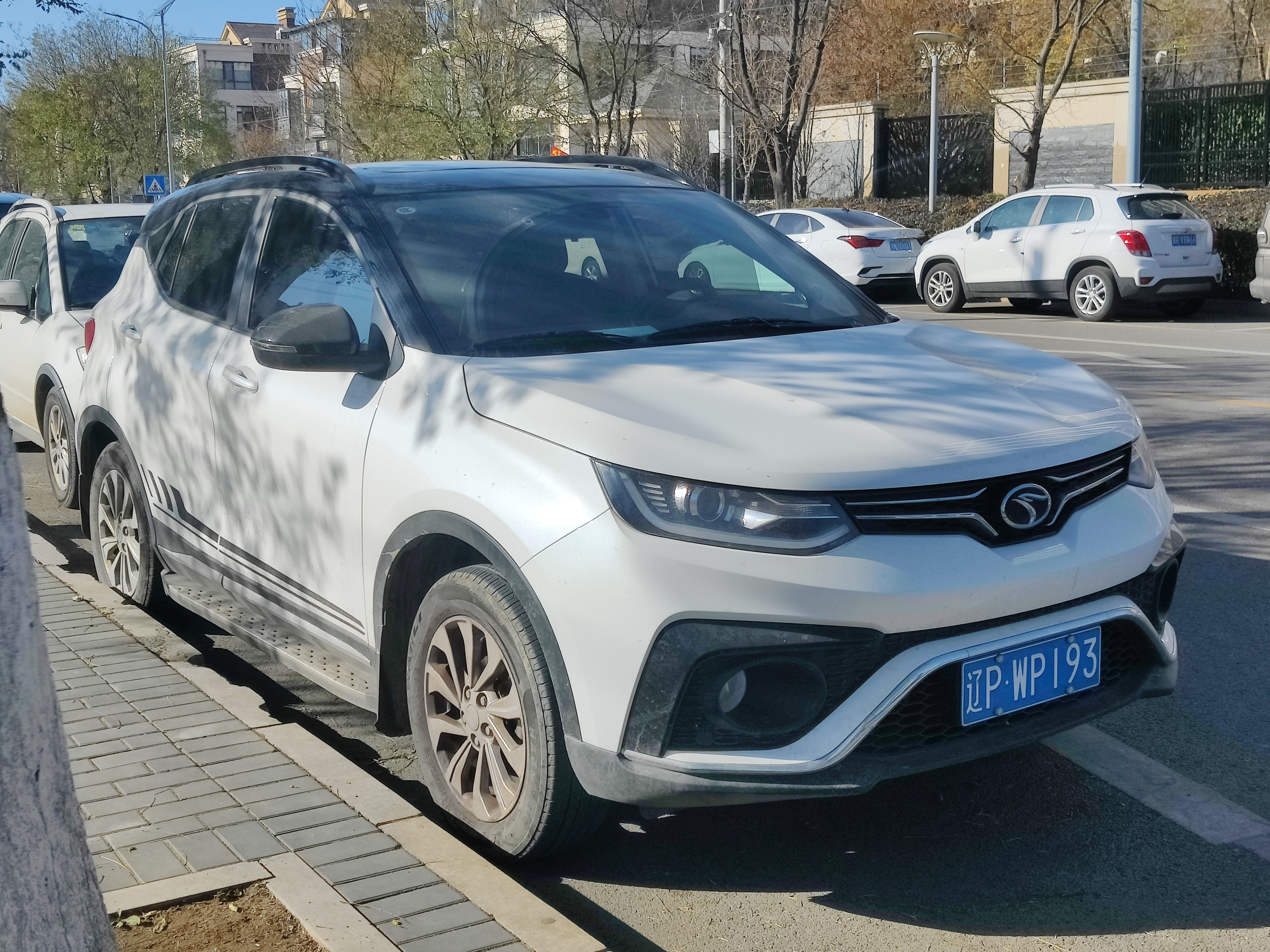
Soueast DX5

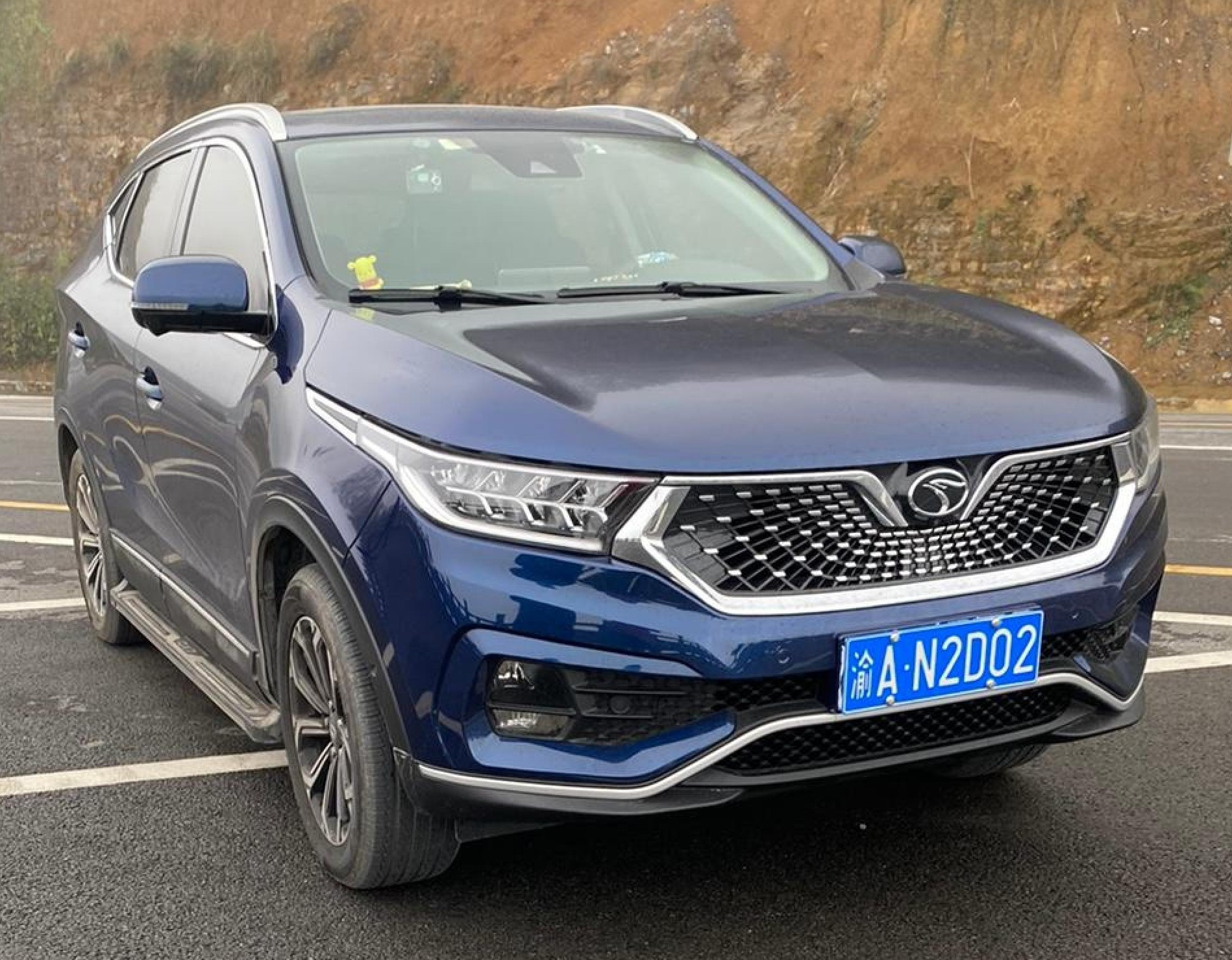
Soueast DX7

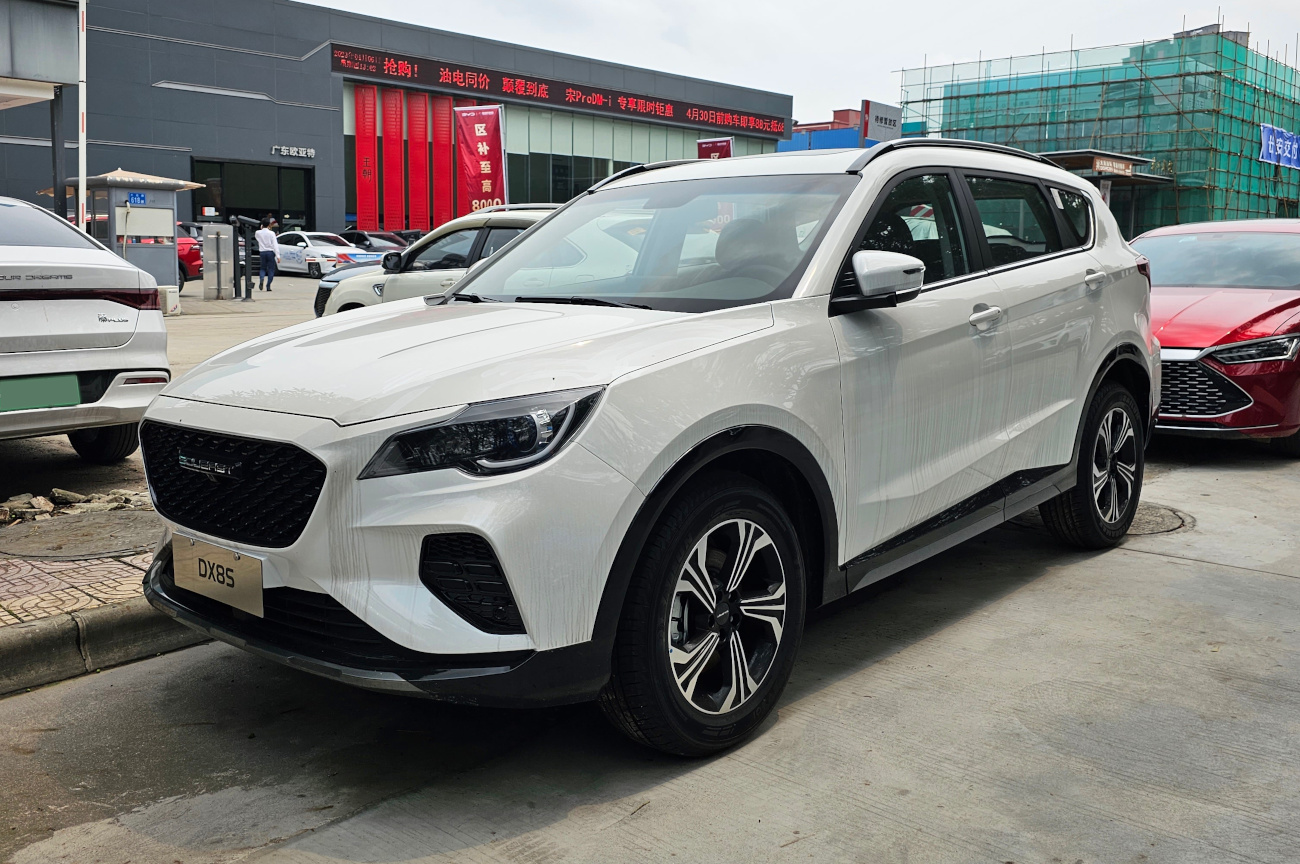
Soueast DX8S

=== Mitsubishi-badged (before 2021) ===
Soueast produces the following models under the Mitsubishi marque:

- Lancer
- Lancer EX
- Lancer Fortis
- Galant
- Zinger
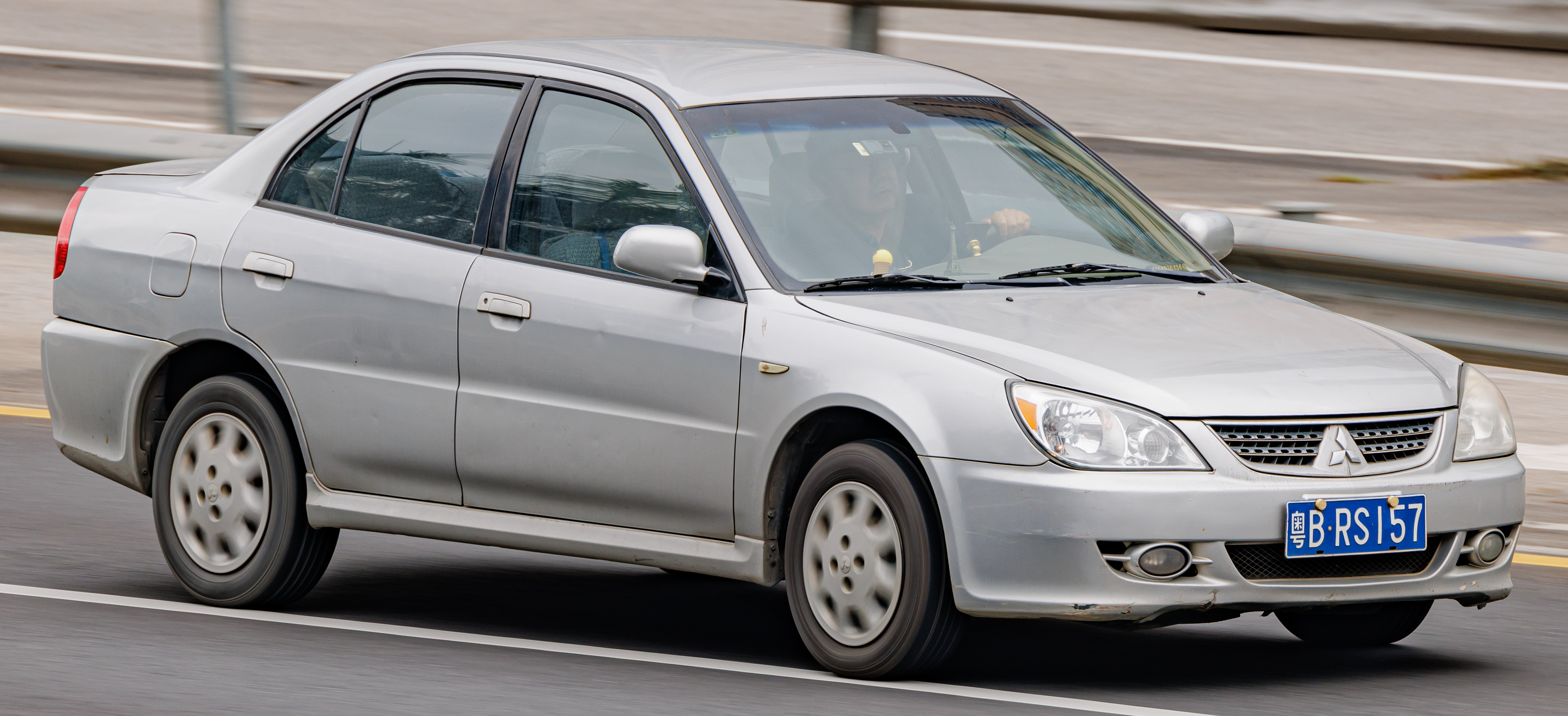
A Mitsubishi Lancer produced by Soueast

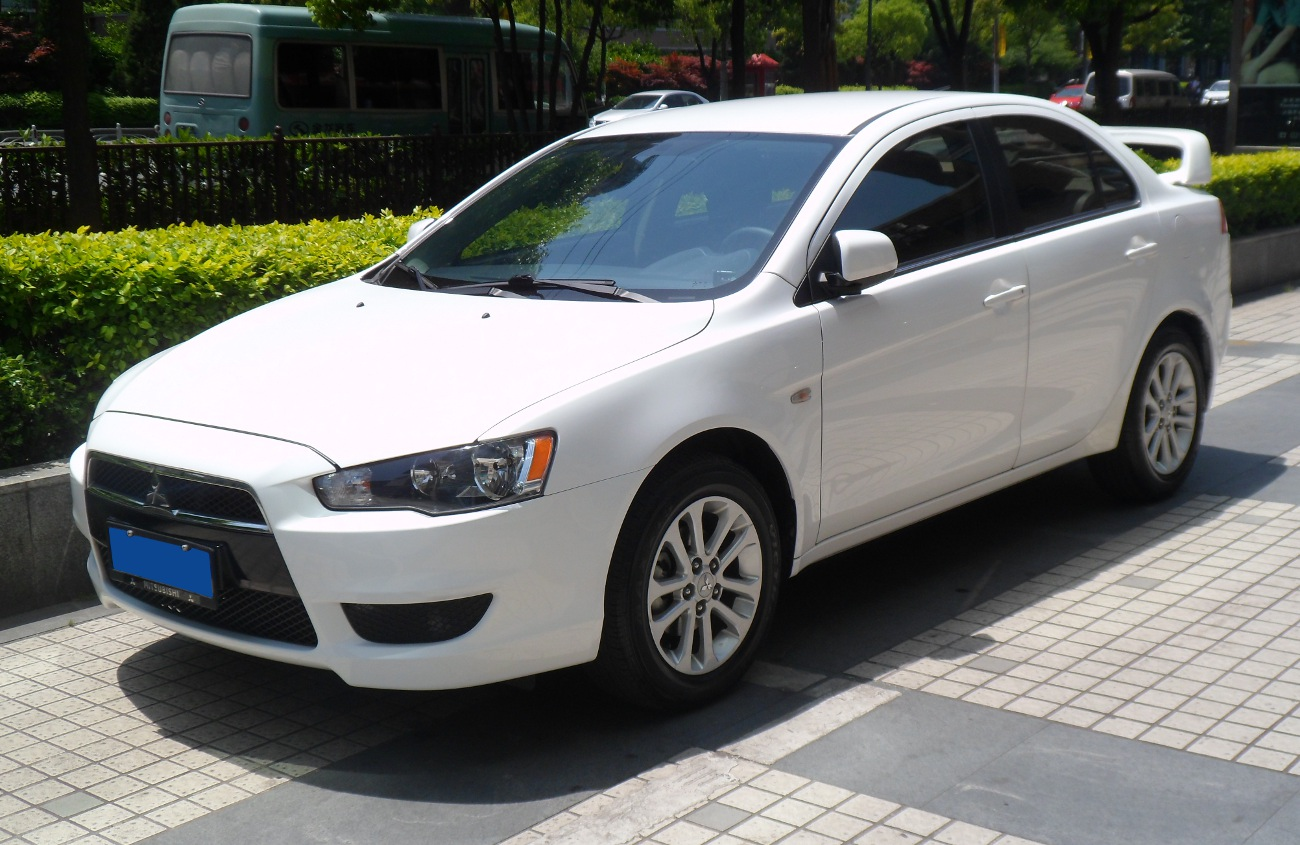
A Mitsubishi Lancer EX produced by Soueast

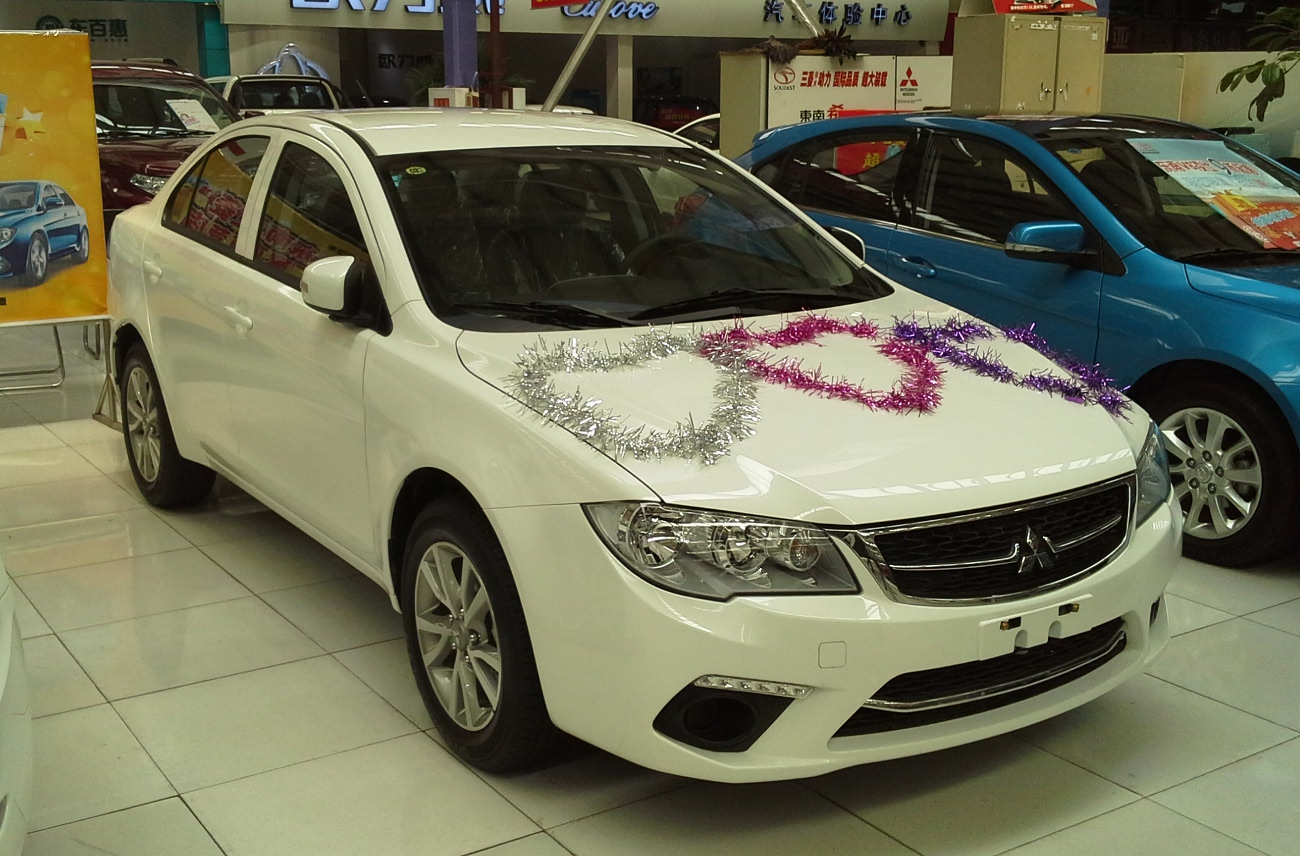
A Mitsubishi Lancer Fortis produced by Soueast

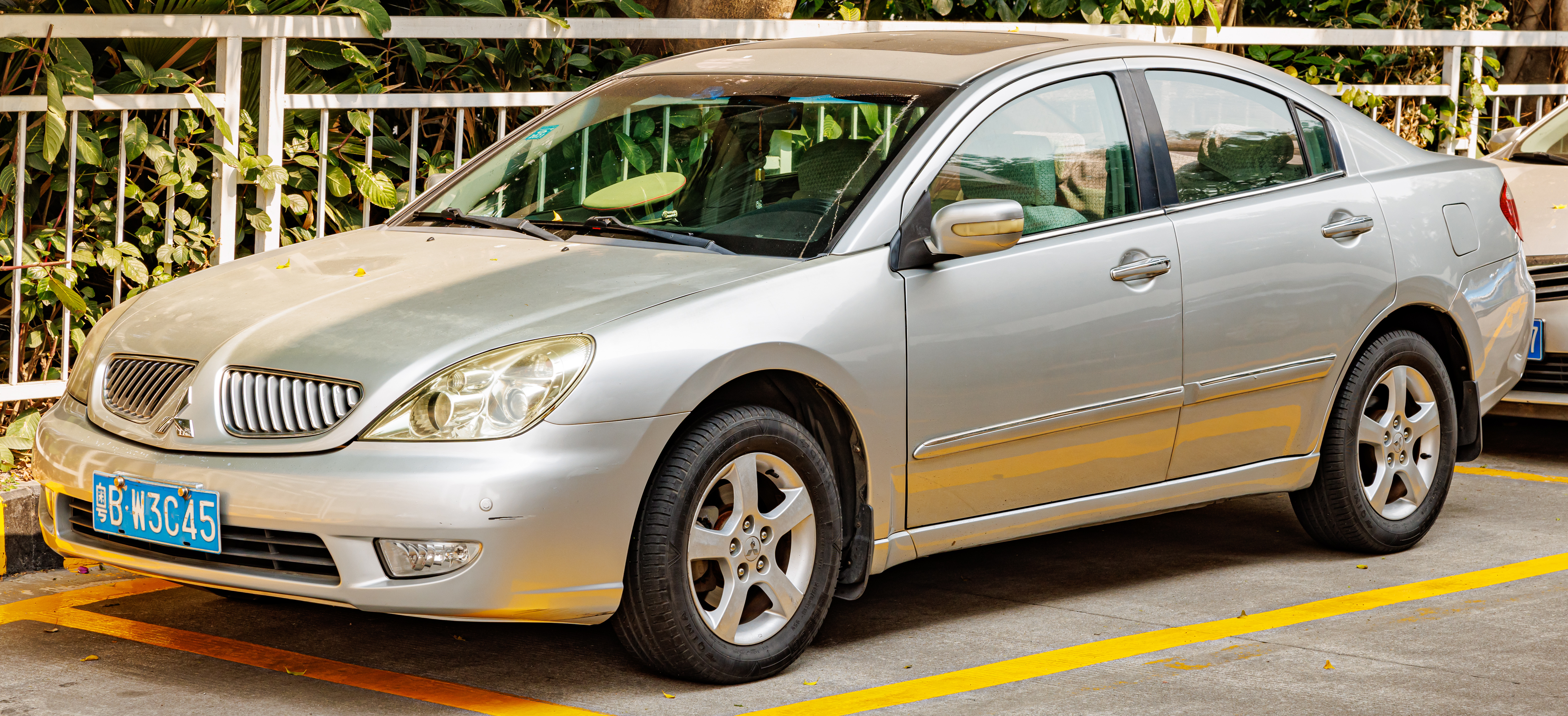
A Mitsubishi Galant produced by Soueast

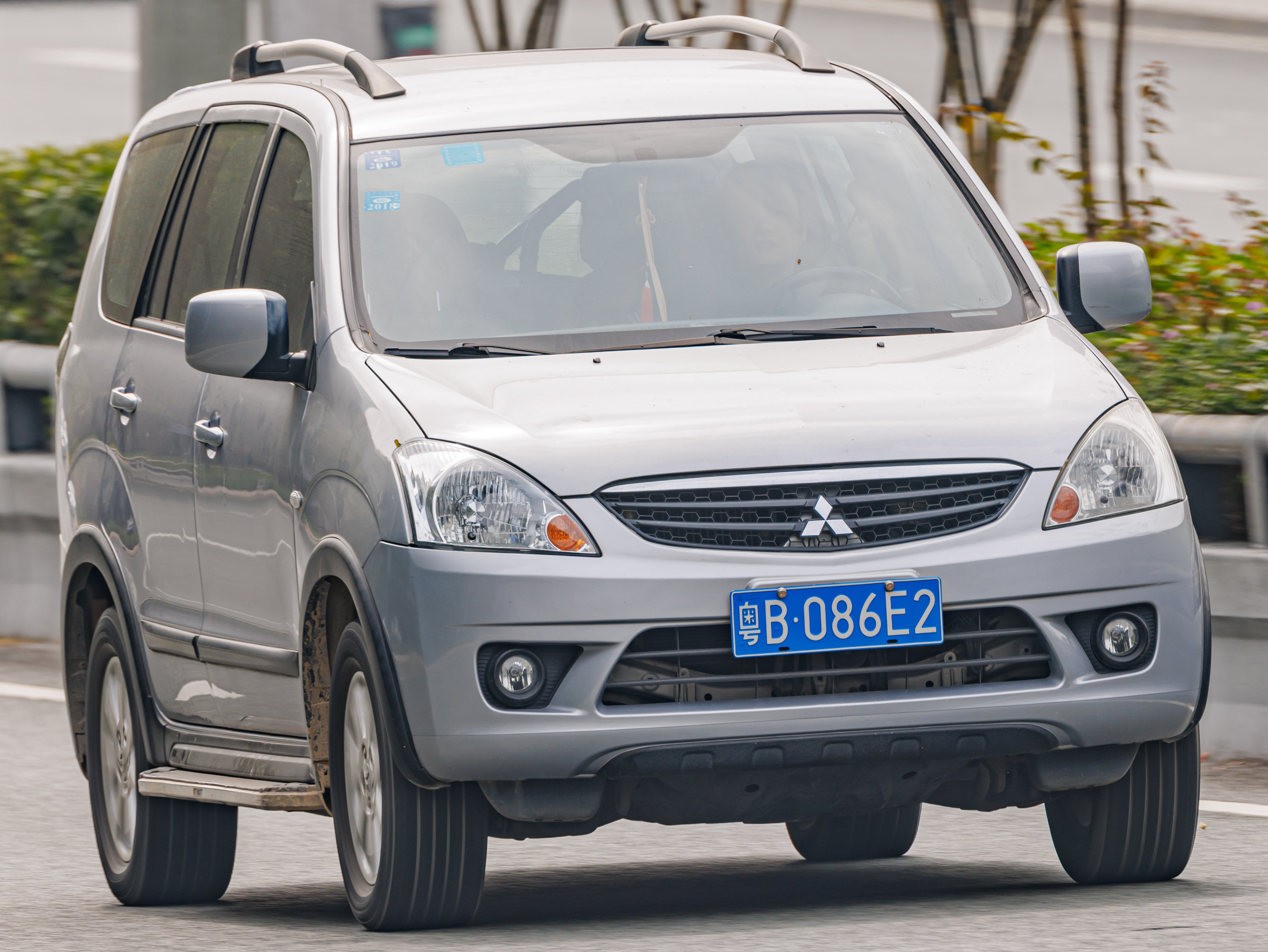
A Mitsubishi Zinger produced by Soueast

=== Dodge marque ===
- Dodge Caravan
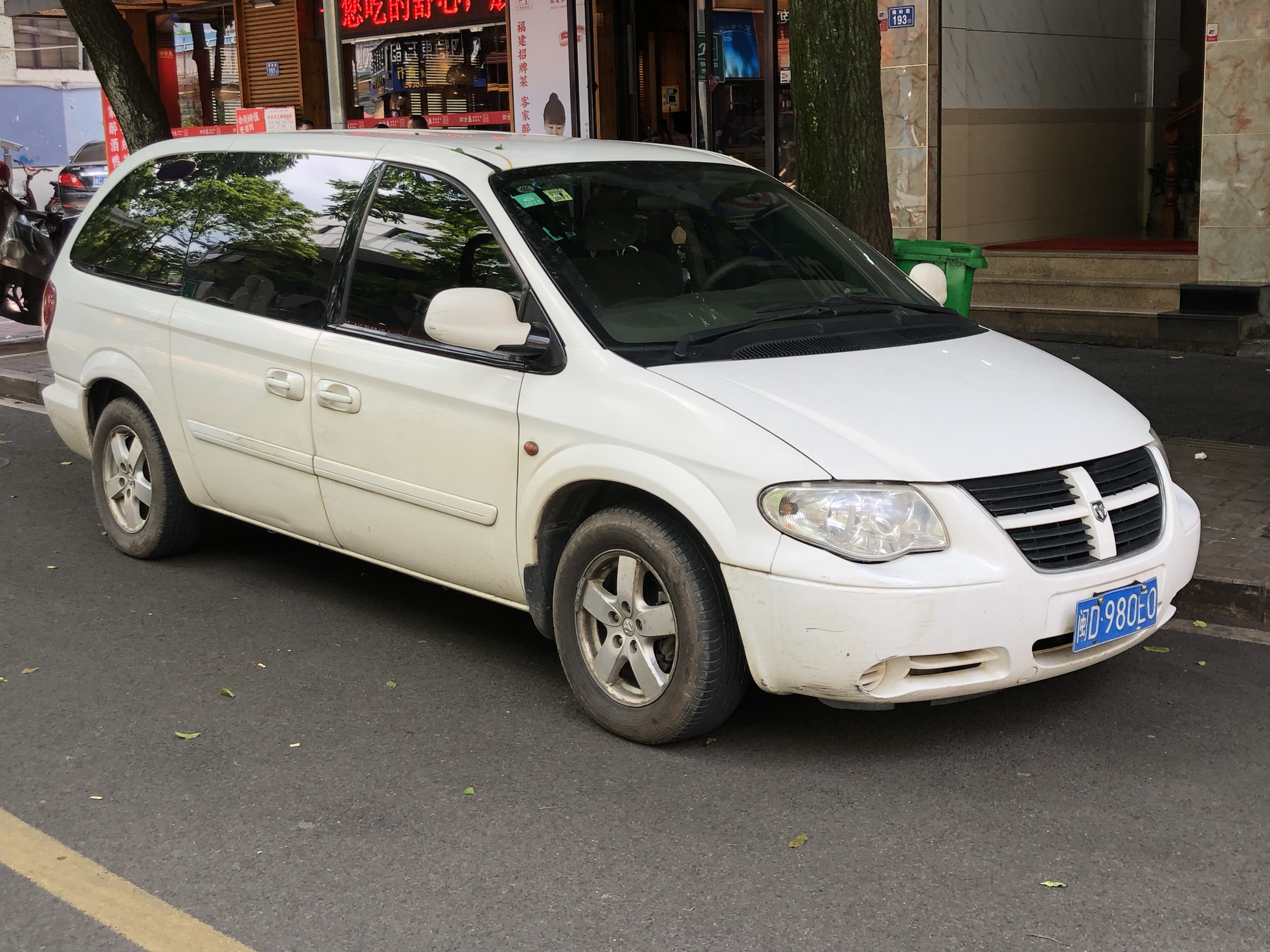
Dodge Caravan

== Operations ==
Soueast has at least one production base in Qingkou city, Minhou County, Fuzhou, Fujian province. This location has probably been expanded three times with the second phase possibly completed c. 2009 as that year saw a 150% increase in units produced. As of early 2011, total yearly production capacity for all sites was forecast to soon reach 300,000 with the completion of the base's third phase. February 2012 production was 37% higher than that of the previous year, which may reflect this additional capacity coming online.

Currently, Soueast Motor operates three major production bases in China located in Wuhu, Kaifeng, and Fuzhou. Globally, the company has established 10 KD factories across regions including the Middle East, Southeast Asia, Central Asia, and Africa.

In 2024, Soueast Motors announced its presence in 18 countries and regions worldwide, with a sales network of 124 established outlets. The company plans to establish directly-operated subsidiaries in seven additional countries and regions by 2025, including Saudi Arabia, Mexico, Malaysia, and Uzbekistan.

== Sales ==
A total of 96,553 Soueast brand passenger cars were sold in China in 2013, making it the 38th largest-selling car brand in the country in that year (and the 21st largest-selling Chinese brand).

== Notes ==
Soueast, a marque of Fuijan Motors Group, vehicle timeline
		1990s			2000s										2010s										2020s					
		7	8	9	0	1	2	3	4	5	6	7	8	9	0	1	2	3	4	5	6	7	8	9	0	1	2	3	4	5
sedan	subcompact							Lioncel						V3																
sedan	subcompact																						A5							
sedan	compact																V5													
hatchback	compact																V6													
crossover	compact																		V Cross											
crossover	compact																							DX5						
crossover	midsize																		DX7											
crossover	midsize																						DX8							
crossover	midsize																								DX9					
crossover	subcompact																				DX3									
crossover	subcompact	van				Veryca										C1														
Delica	subcompact	van																												
MPV	compact					Freeca																								
