= Soueast V5 =

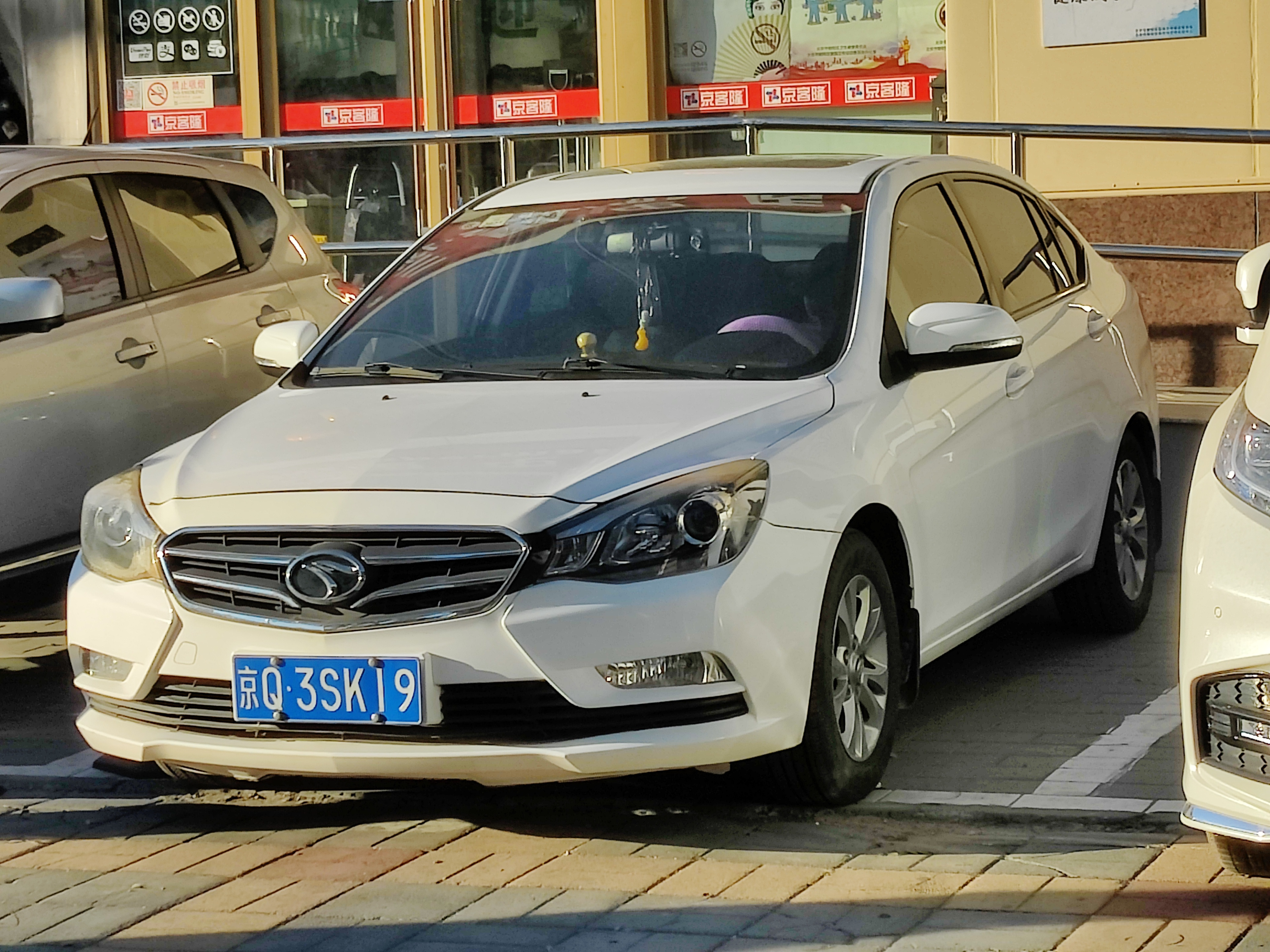

Overview
- Manufacturer: Soueast
- Also called: Soueast V6 Ling Shi (hatchback); Soueast V Cross (crossover)
- Production: 2012–2020
- Assembly: China: Fuzhou (Soueast)

Body and chassis
- Body style: 4-door sedan (V5 Lingzhi); 5-door hatchback (V6 Ling Shi)
- Layout: Front-engine, front-wheel-drive
- Related: Soueast A5

Powertrain
- Engine: 1.5 L 4A91 I4 (petrol); 1.5 L 4A91 I4 (turbo petrol)
- Transmission: 5-speed manual CVT

Dimensions
- Wheelbase: 2,615 mm (103.0 in) (Soueast V5); 2,610 mm (102.8 in) (Soueast V Cross)
- Length: 4,578 mm (180.2 in) (Soueast V5); 4,475 mm (176.2 in) (Soueast V Cross)
- Width: 1,775 mm (69.9 in) (Soueast V5); 1,770 mm (69.7 in) (Soueast V Cross)
- Height: 1,480 mm (58.3 in) (Soueast V5); 1,535 mm (60.4 in) (Soueast V Cross)
- Curb weight: 1,210 kg (2,670 lb) (Soueast V5); 1,210–1,230 mm (47.6–48.4 in) (Soueast V Cross)

The Soueast V5 Lingzhi (Chinese: 菱致) is a compact sedan produced by Chinese manufacturer Soueast Motors from 2012 to 2020 to replace the Soueast V3 Lingzhi.

== Overview ==
The V5 Lingzhi was previewed by the V5 concept during the 2008 Beijing Auto Show, with the production version debuting during the 2012 Beijing Auto Show and listed in September 2012.

=== Technical specifications ===
The Soueast V5 was based on the same platform as the previous generation Mitsubishi Lancer that was still being made by the SouEast-Mitsubishi joint venture in China. Prices for the V5 Lingzhi ranged from around ¥70,000-90,000. The V5 was only available with an imported Mitsubishi-sourced 4B10 1.8 liter engine which produced 144hp mated to a continuously variable transmission (CVT) at launch, with SouEast offering its own 1.5 liter engine and 1.5 liter turbo engine in following updates.

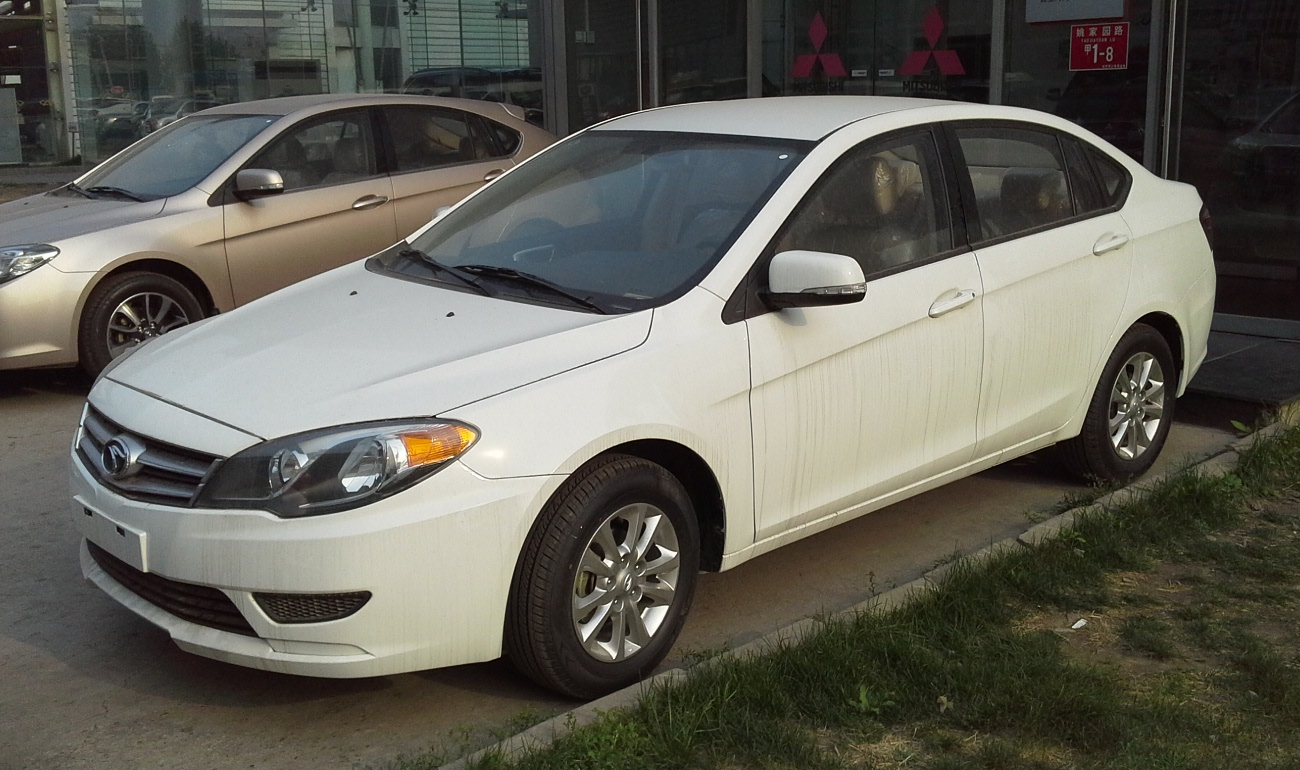
Soueast V5 Lingzhi

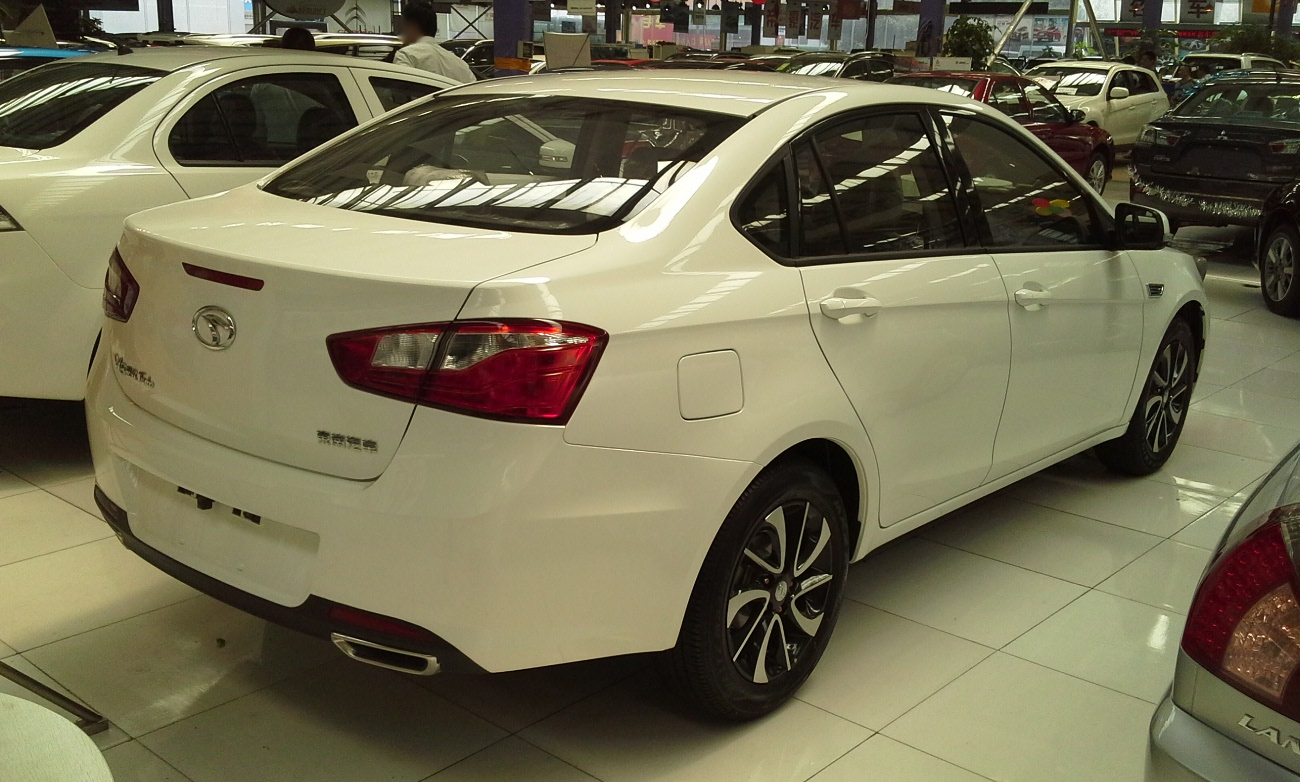
Soueast V5 Lingzhi rear view

=== Soueast V5 Lingzhi Plus ===
A facelift was conducted in 2015 dubbed the Lingzhi Plus, changing the front and rear end designs. The Soueast V5 plus was offered in seven variants, with two engine options carried over from the pre-facelift model, a 1.5 liter naturally aspirated engine and a 1.5 liter turbocharged engine. There are also two transmission options also carried over from the pre-facelift model, including both the manual transmission and the continuously variable transmission. Maximum engine power is 110 kW (150 PS), with the maximum torque being 200 N ·M. The price range of the V5 Lingzhi Plus is ¥76,900-105,900.

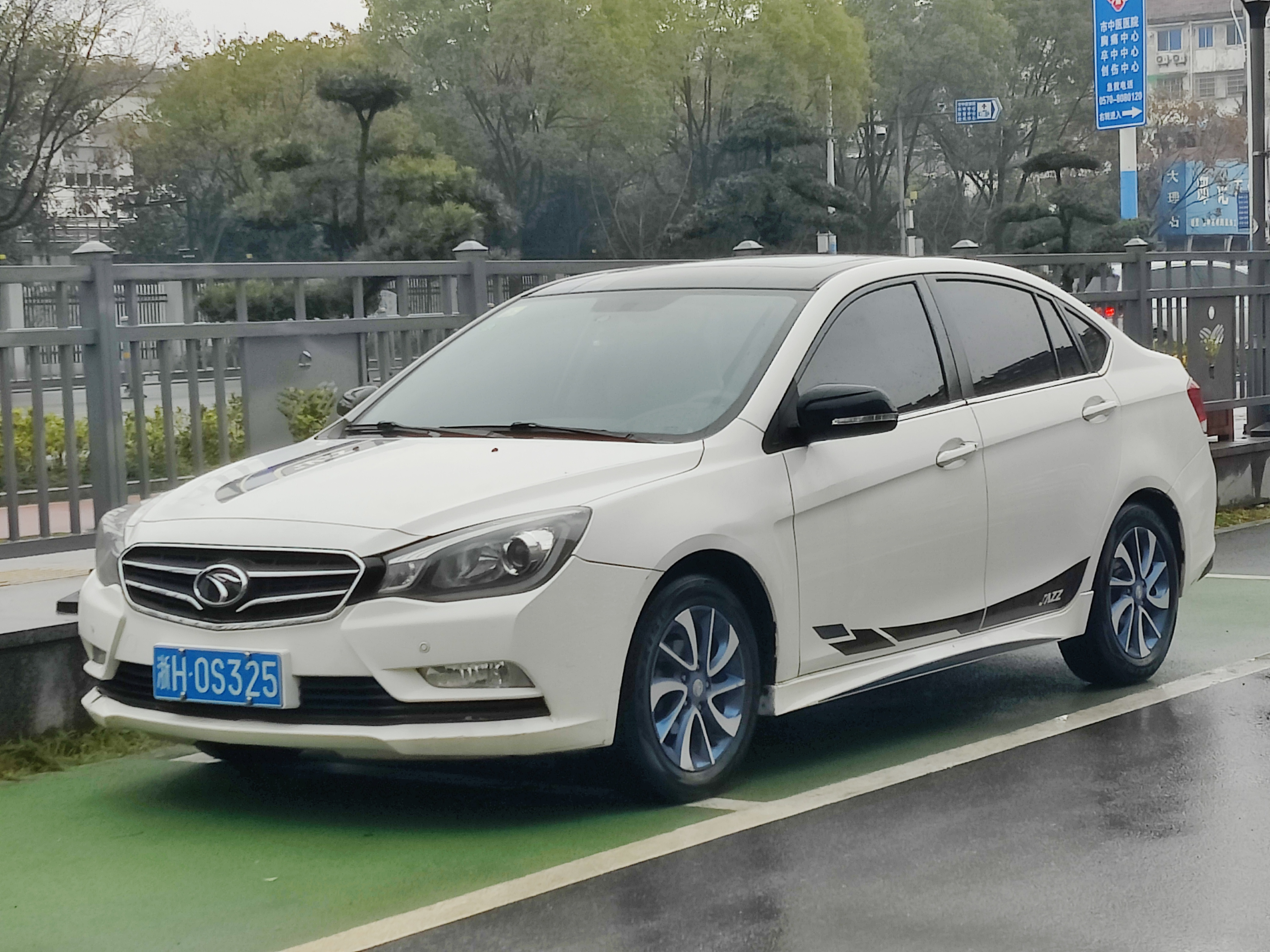
Soueast V5 Lingzhi Plus front view

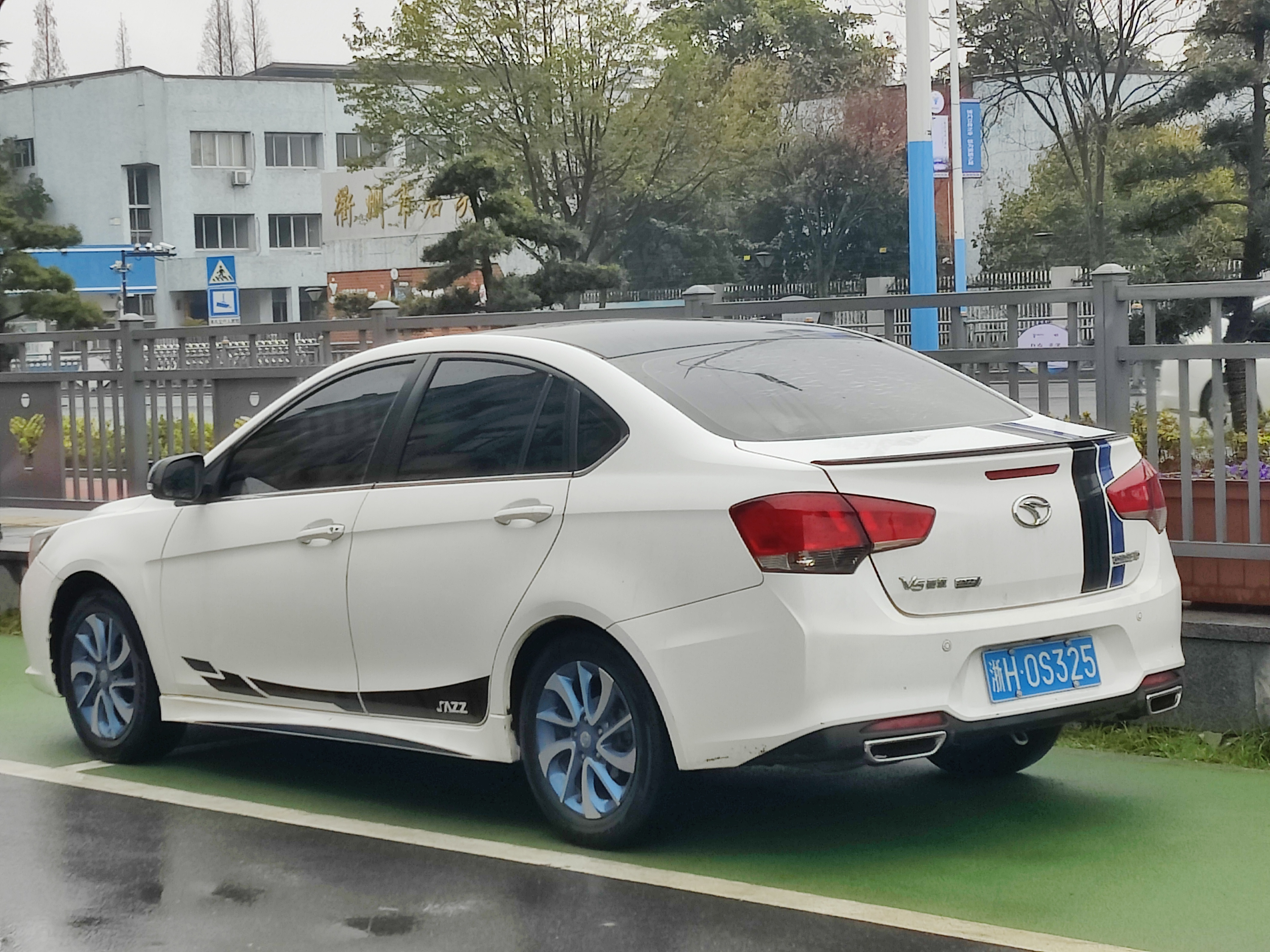
Soueast V5 Lingzhi Plus rear view

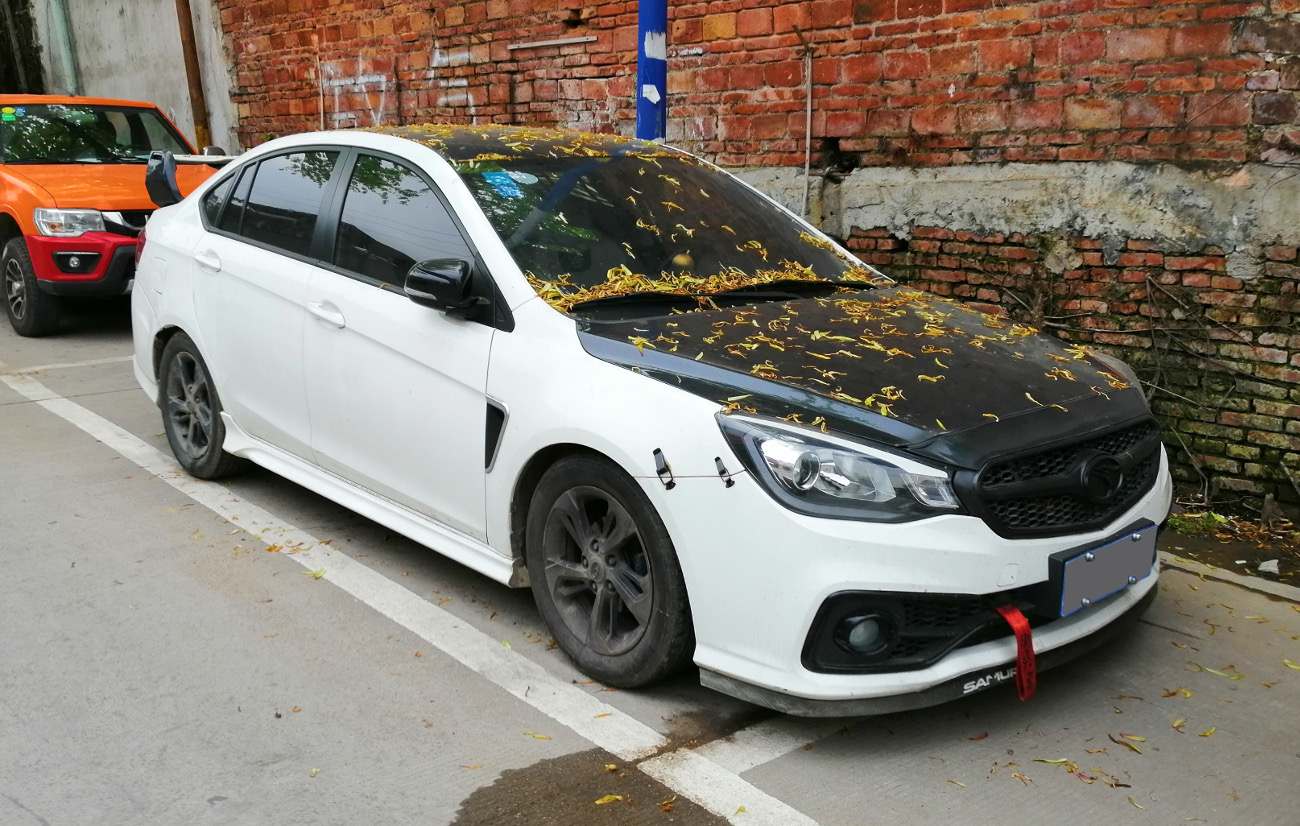
Modified example of the Soueast V5 Lingzhi Plus front view

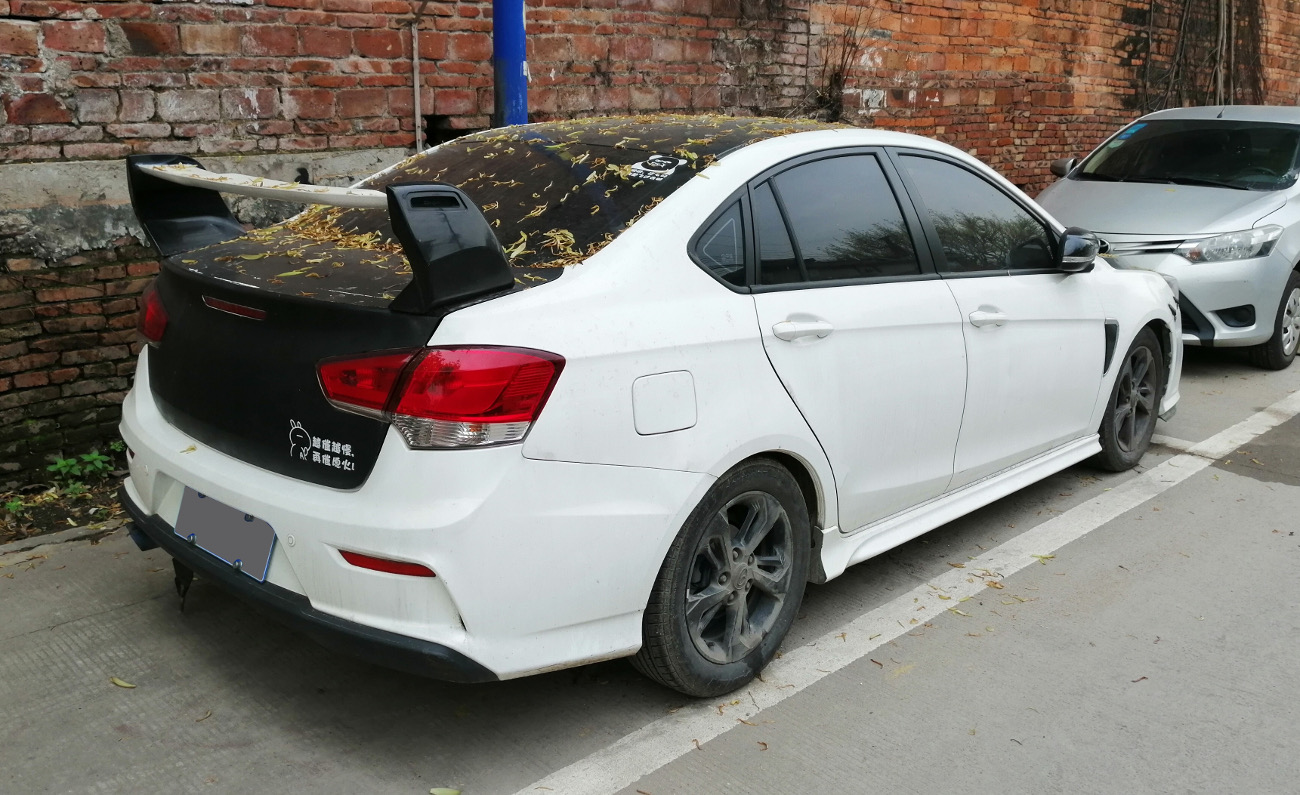
Modified example of the Soueast V5 Lingzhi Plus rear view

== Soueast V6 Lingshi ==
The Soueast V6 Ling Shi is the compact hatchback version of the SouEast V5 Lingzhi compact sedan. It was previewed by the Soueast V6 concept on the 2012 Beijing Auto Show in April 2012. The early production version debuted on the 2012 Guangzhou Auto Show in December 2012 and the official launch was during the 2013 Shanghai Auto Show.

The V6 is based on the same platform of the SouEast V5 Lingzhi sedan which is also shared with the Mitsubishi Lancer that is made by the SouEast-Mitsubishi joint venture. Only engine available for the V6 is a 1.5 liter with 120hp and 143nm, mated to a 5-speed manual transmission or a CVT gearbox.

The Soueast V6 Lingshi hatchback was officially launched on the 2013 Shanghai Auto Show and introduced to the Chinese car market at the same time with prices starting from 74,800 yuan to 95,800 yuan.

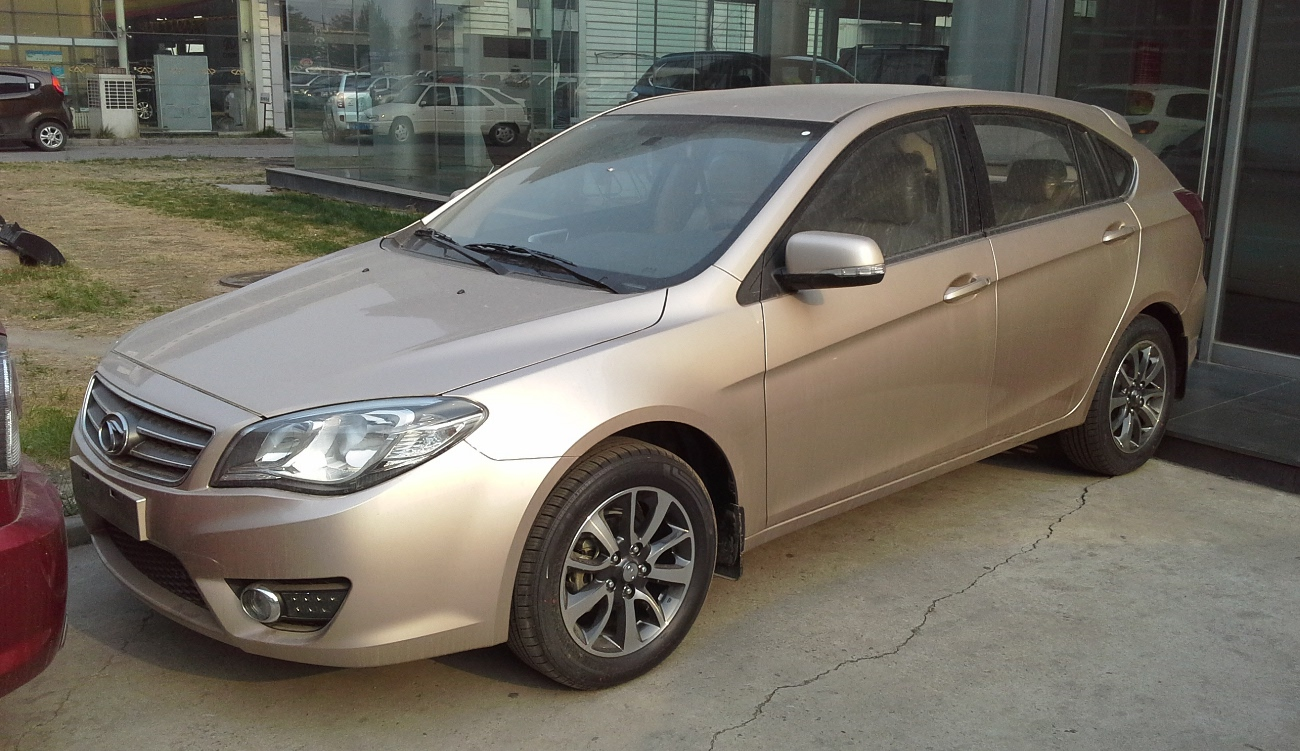
Soueast V6 Lingshi front

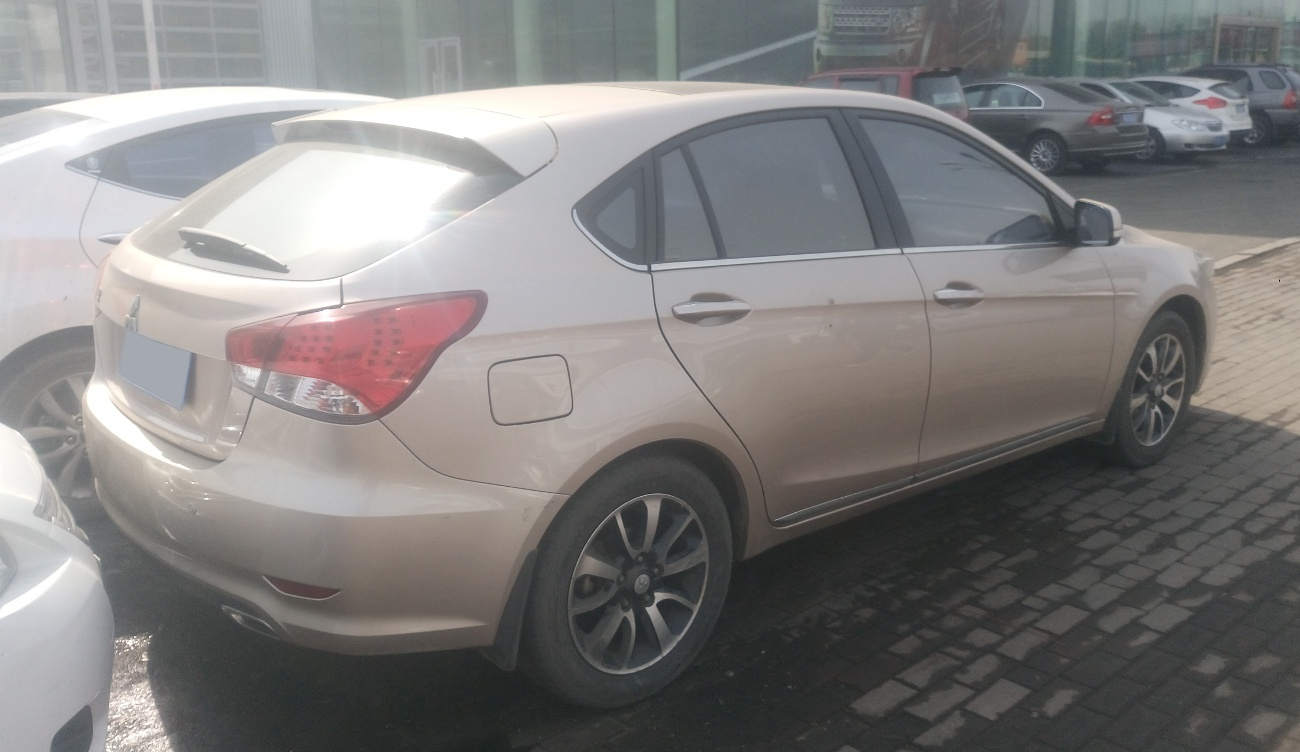
Soueast V6 Lingshi rear

=== Soueast V6 Lingshi Turbo ===
The SouEast V6 Lingshi Turbo is a sportier variant of the V6 hatchback equipped with a turbocharged 1.5 liter four-cylinder petrol engine with an output of 141hp and 210nm, mated to a 6-speed manual transmission or a CVT gearbox. The sportier Soueast V6 Lingshi Turbo was launched on the Chinese auto market in late 2013 with prices starting from 86,800 yuan to 114,800 yuan.

== Soueast V Cross ==
A crossover version based on the Soueast V6 Lingshi hatchback dubbed the Soueast V6 Ling Shi Cross or later simply the Soueast V Cross debuted during the 2014 Beijing Auto Show. Engines are a 1.5 liter engine with 120hp and 143nm, or a 1.5 liter turbo engine with 141hp and 210nm. The 1.5 liter engine comes with a 5-speed manual transmission or a CVT gearbox, while the 1.5 liter turbo engine is mated with a 6-speed manual transmission or a CVT gearbox.

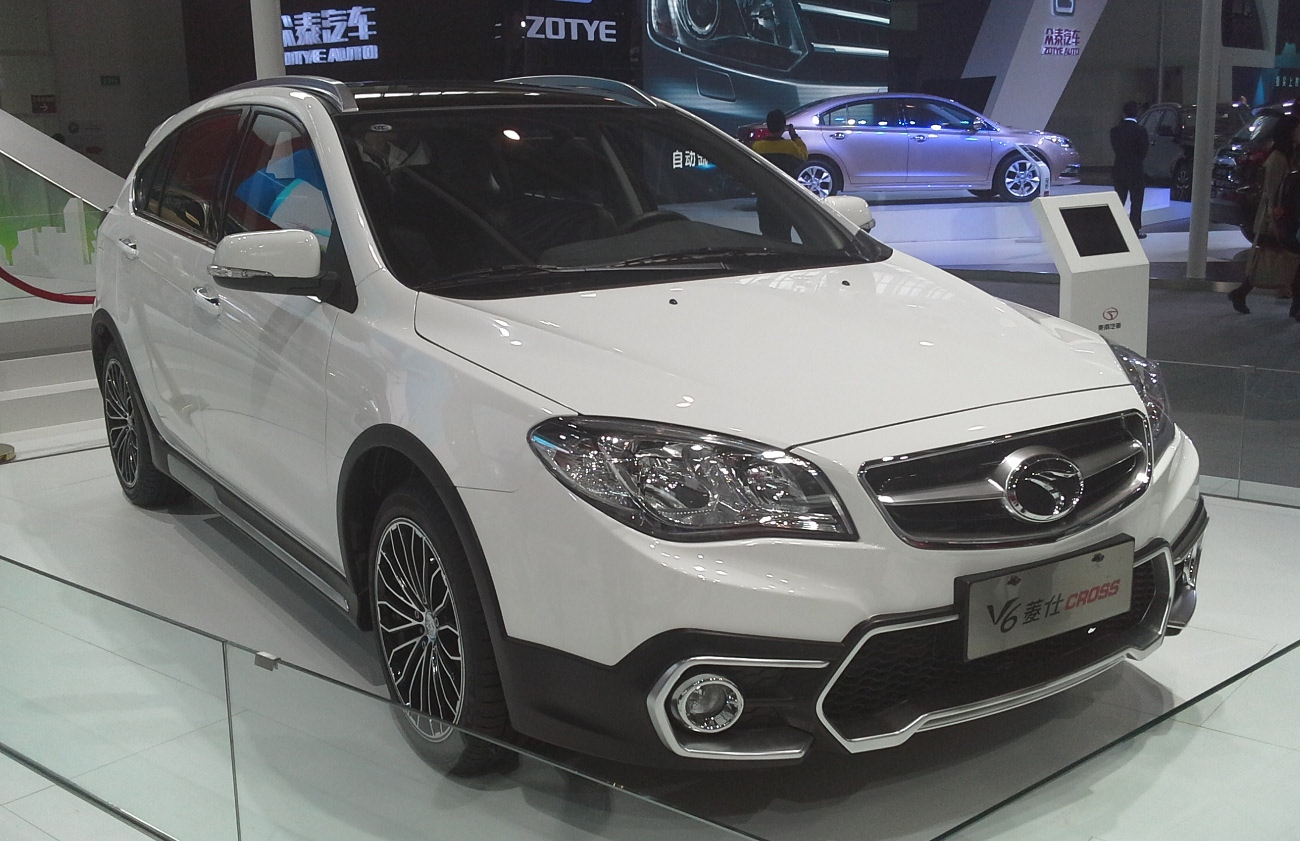
Soueast V6 Lingshi Cross front

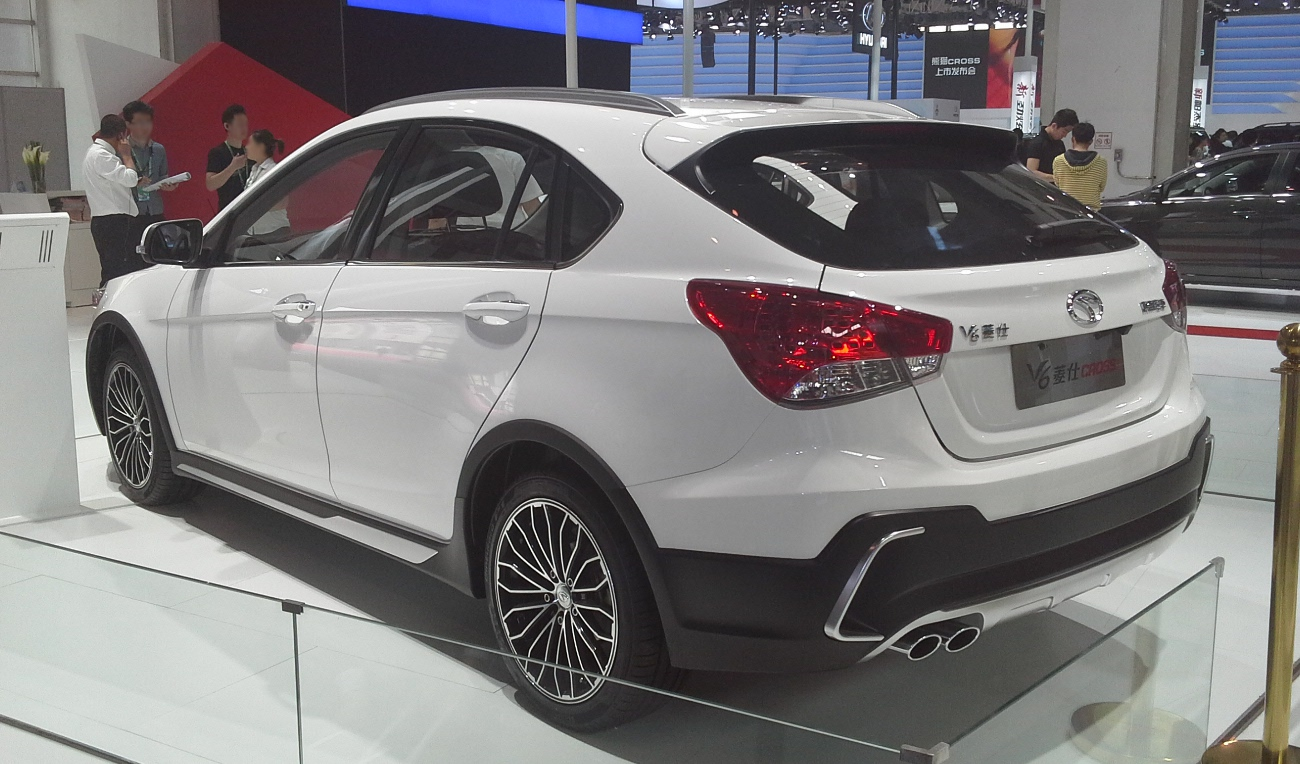
Soueast V6 Lingshi Cross rear

== See also ==
- Mitsubishi Lancer
