= Soueast DX9 =

Mid-size SUV

Overview
- Manufacturer: Soueast Motors
- Production: 2020
- Assembly: Fuzhou, Fujian, China

Body and chassis
- Class: Mid-size SUV
- Body style: 5-door SUV
- Layout: Front-engine, front-wheel drive (FF)

Powertrain
- Engine: 1.8 L turbo

Dimensions
- Wheelbase: 2,800 mm (110 in)
- Length: 4,870 mm (192 in)
- Width: 1,950 mm (77 in)
- Height: 1,818 mm (71.6 in)

The Soueast DX9 is a mid-size SUV unveiled by Chinese automobile manufacturer Soueast Motors in 2020.

== Overview ==
MIIT images of the Soueast DX9 surfaced online in June 2020. Positioned above the Soueast DX7, the DX9 will be the flagship SUV of the Soueast brand. It is the first Soueast vehicle to wear the company's new logo.

== Specifications ==
The Soueast DX9 is powered by a 1.8L turbocharged engine that outputs 245 horsepower.
