= Jetour X70M =

Jetour X70M is a name used by Jetour on the following SUVs:

- Jetour X70M (Mid-size crossover SUV), the entry level variant of the Jetour X70 mid-size crossover SUV produced by Jetour in China in 2020–2022
- Jetour X70M (Subcompact crossover SUV), a subcompact crossover SUV based on the Soueast DX3 sold in China since 2026.
