= DX5 =

DX5 may refer to:

- Soueast DX5, a compact crossover SUV
- Yamaha DX5 synthesizer, an electronic musical instrument
- DX5, an antibody which binds to CD49b antigens

DX5 is also the code name used by the main character "Macgyver" in the long running television show "Macgyver"
