= Jetour =

Chinese automotive brand owned by Chery

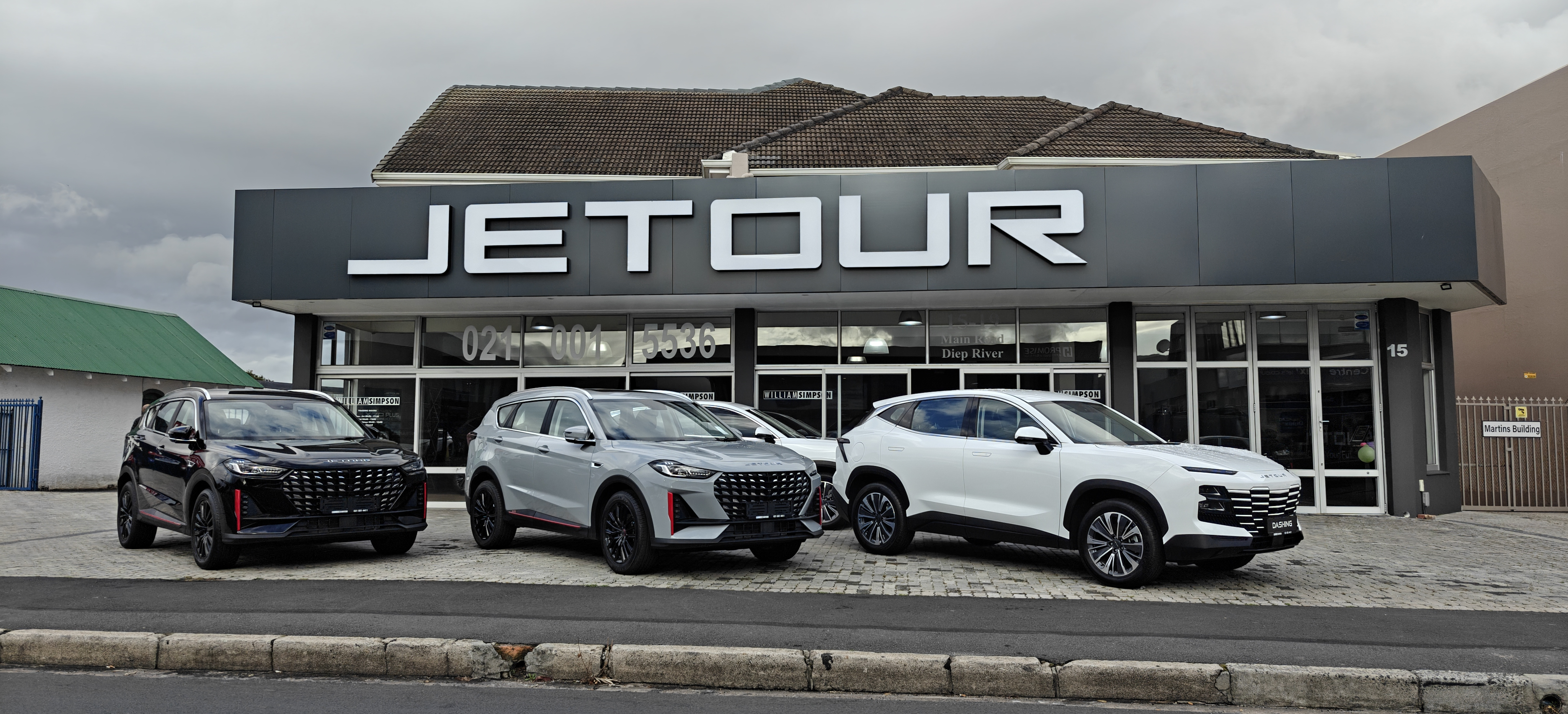
- Jetour dealership in Cape Town, South Africa
- Type: Division
- Industry: Automotive
- Founded: January 2018; 8 years ago
- Headquarters: Wuhu, Anhui, China
- Area served: China; Middle East; Caribbean; South America; Africa; Russia; Southeast Asia; Pakistan; Sri Lanka
- Key people: Li Xueyong (general manager)
- Products: Automobiles, SUVs
- Production output: ▲568,387 vehicles (2024)
- Parent: Chery Holding Group

Chinese name
- Simplified Chinese: 捷途
- Traditional Chinese: 捷途
- Hanyu Pinyin: Jiétú
- Website: jetour.com.cn; zonghenglive.com (Zongheng)

Jetour (Chinese: 捷途; pinyin: Jiétú; lit. 'victory road') is a marque of Chinese vehicle manufacturer Chery Automobile that was established in 2018. The brand mainly produces SUVs.

The name "Jetour" is a combination of the word "jet" and "tour", which according to the brand signifies a "convenient journey".

== History ==
The Jetour brand was launched on January 22, 2018. During the brand launch, the original Jetour X70 crossover SUV was also introduced, riding on a new chassis called the iPeL, or intelligent platform of e-network and lightweight. Later in April during the 2018 Beijing Auto Show, Jetour introduced the Jetour X Electric Concept Car, which previewed the Jetour X90 crossover SUV. The entire Jetour product range would also be no smaller than midsize segments, with options for 5, 6, or 7-seat configurations, while offering Internal combustion engine, fully electric, and plug-in hybrid. In China, Jetour vehicles are distributed by Wuhu Jetour Automobile Sales Co., Ltd.

Logomark since 2023, used by the Jetour Shanhai product line in China

In July 2021, Yin Tongyue, chairman of Chery Holding Group announced that Jetour would be rebranded to Jetour Automobile, and will be "on an equal footing" with other brands under the group. The brand targeted to achieve an annual sales of 1 million vehicles by 2026.

In November 2023, Jetour announced its new energy sub-brand called Jetour Shanhai (Chinese: 捷途山海; pinyin: Jiétú Shānhǎi; lit. 'mountain and seas'), which will consist of 8 plug-in hybrid products, including L6, TL, P-3, T-2, L9, L7 and others. The first model introduced was the Shanhai L9, based on the Jetour X90.

In January 2024, the 1 millionth Jetour vehicle rolled off the production line, 65 months after the brand's establishment.

== Overseas markets ==
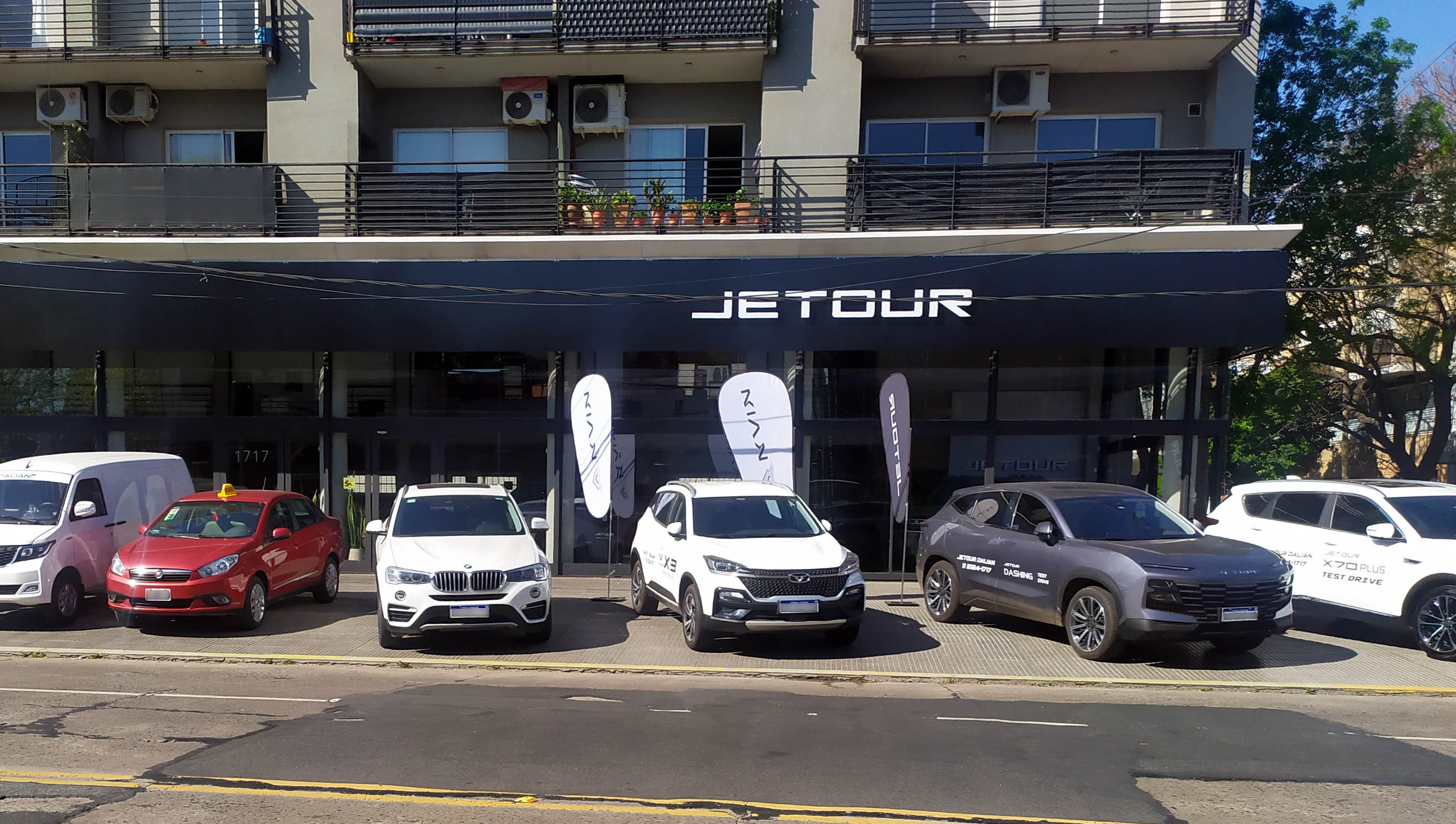
Jetour dealership in Argentina in 2025

Outside China, the Jetour brand is available in the Middle East, the Philippines, Jamaica, Georgia, Russia, Egypt, Indonesia, Cambodia, Malaysia and some Latin American & Caribbean markets, such as Argentina, Chile, the Dominican Republic, Peru, Uruguay, Mexico, Panama, Ecuador, and African markets, such as South Africa, and Nigeria.

In April 2023, during the 2023 Manila International Auto Show, the Jetour brand was launched for the Philippine market. The brand was launched in Russia in 2023.

In April 2024, Jetour confirmed that it is preparing to produce right-hand drive vehicles to enter right-hand drive markets such as Indonesia and Malaysia. In February 2025, United Motors launched Jetour vehicles in Pakistan, by introducing the Jetour Dashing and Jetour X70 Plus. In April 2025, Jetour Auto Malaysia officially launched the Jetour Dashing in Malaysia. The Jetour Dashing will be locally assembled in Malaysia.

Jetour announced its arrival in Brazil with its own operation, with a launch scheduled for the first quarter of 2026.

In January 2026, Jetour's parent company Chery and India's JSW Group entered into a partnership where JSW would sell rebadged Chery cars under the JSW Motors brand. Their first vehicle would be the Jetour T2.

In May 2026, Jetour announced a fully locked-in entry into the Australian market by early 2027. The lineup will feature the T1, T2, S06, Dashing, G700 (could be re-named to T700) and the F700, along with a small electric SUV (inspired by the Huanyouzhe) and a 7-seater SUV that could be named the T8. These 2 new models will reach global markets shortly after the launch in Australia.

== Products ==
=== Jetour models ===
- Jetour Dashing (2022–present), compact SUV
  - Jetour Shanhai L6 (2024–2026), PHEV variant of Dashing
- Jetour Traveller/T2 (2023–present), mid-size SUV
  - Jetour Traveller 7 (2026–present), upgraded variant of Traveller
  - Jetour Shanhai T2 (2024–2025), PHEV variant of Traveller
  - Jetour Traveller C-DM (2025–present), PHEV variant of Traveller
- Jetour Freedom/T1 (2024–present), compact SUV
  - Jetour Freedom 7 (2026–present), upgraded variant of Freedom
  - Jetour Shanhai T1 (2024–present), PHEV variant of Freedom
- Jetour X70M (2026–present), compact SUV, rebadged Soueast DX3
- Jetour X70 (2018–present), mid-size SUV
- Jetour X70 Plus (2022–present), mid-size SUV, second generation X70
  - Jetour X70 Pro (2023–2025), upgraded variant of X70 Plus
  - Jetour X70 C-DM (2024–2025), PHEV variant of X70 Plus
- Jetour X70L (2025–present), mid-size SUV
  - Jetour Shanhai L7 Plus (2025–present), PHEV variant of X70L
- Jetour X90 (2019–present), mid-size SUV
  - Jetour X90 Plus (2021–present), upgraded variant of X90
    - Jetour X90 Pro (2024–2026), upgraded variant of X90 Plus
  - Jetour Shanhai L9 (2024–2026), PHEV variant of X90 Pro

=== Jetour Zongheng models ===
- Jetour Zongheng G700 (2025–present), full-size SUV, PHEV
- Jetour Zongheng F700 (2026–present), full-size pickup truck, PHEV

=== Planned ===
- Jetour Zongheng R700 (upcoming), mid-size SUV, PHEV, based on Jetour Zongheng G600 concept
- Jetour Zongheng G900 (upcoming), full-size SUV, PHEV
- Jetour Huanyouzhe (upcoming), compact crossover SUV, EV
- Jetour Traveller 8 (upcoming), full-size SUV
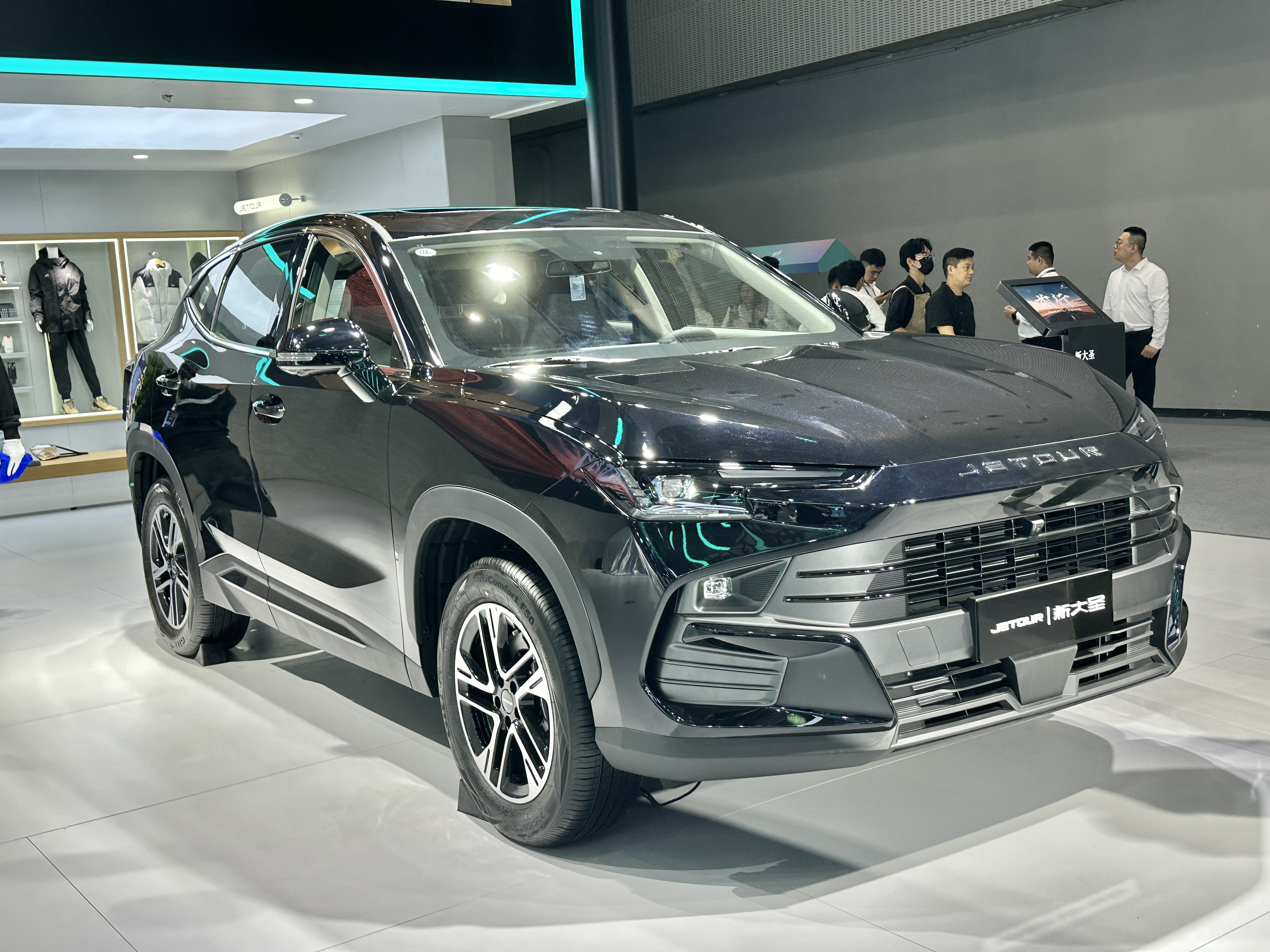
Jetour Dashing

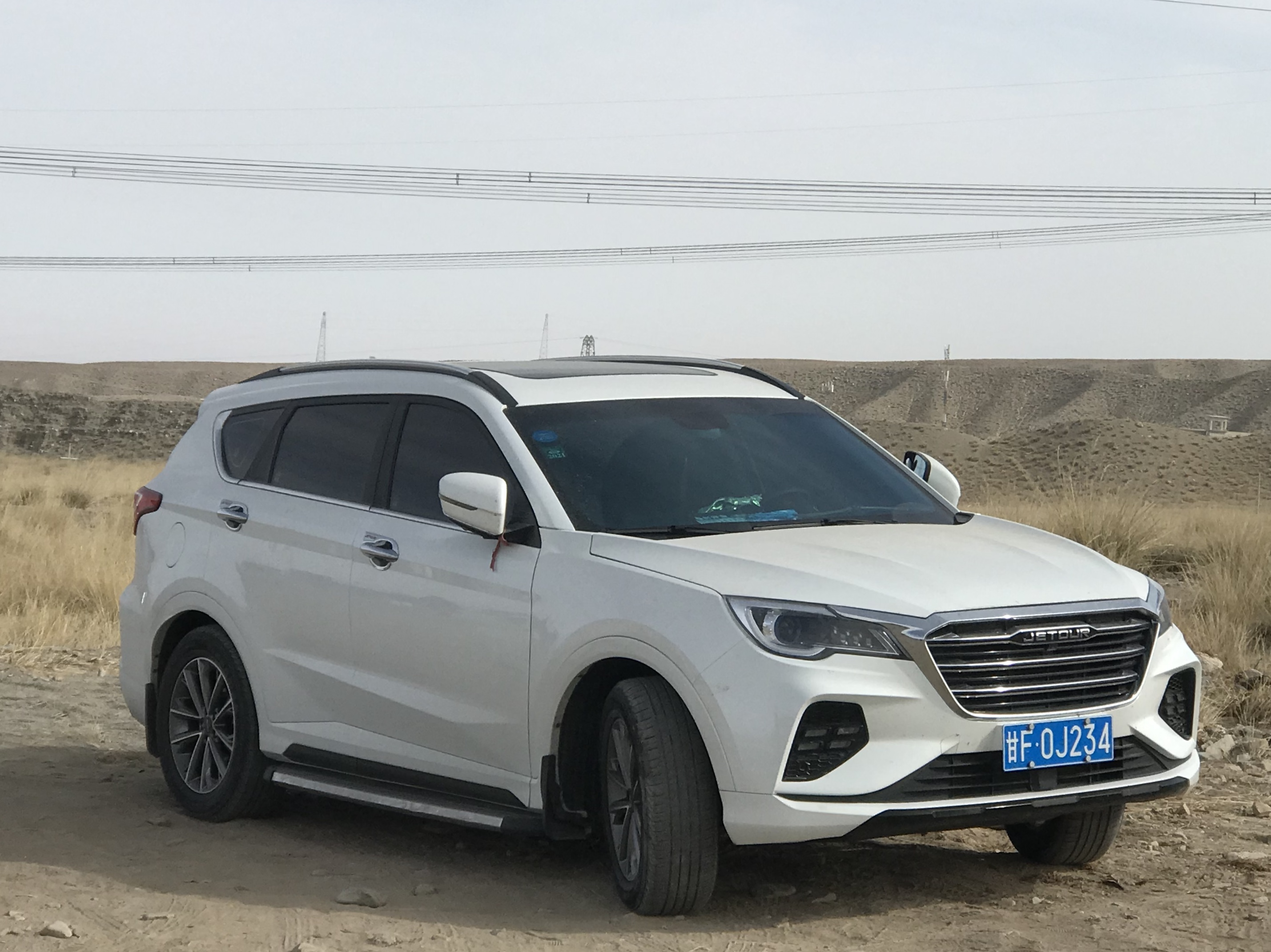
Jetour X70

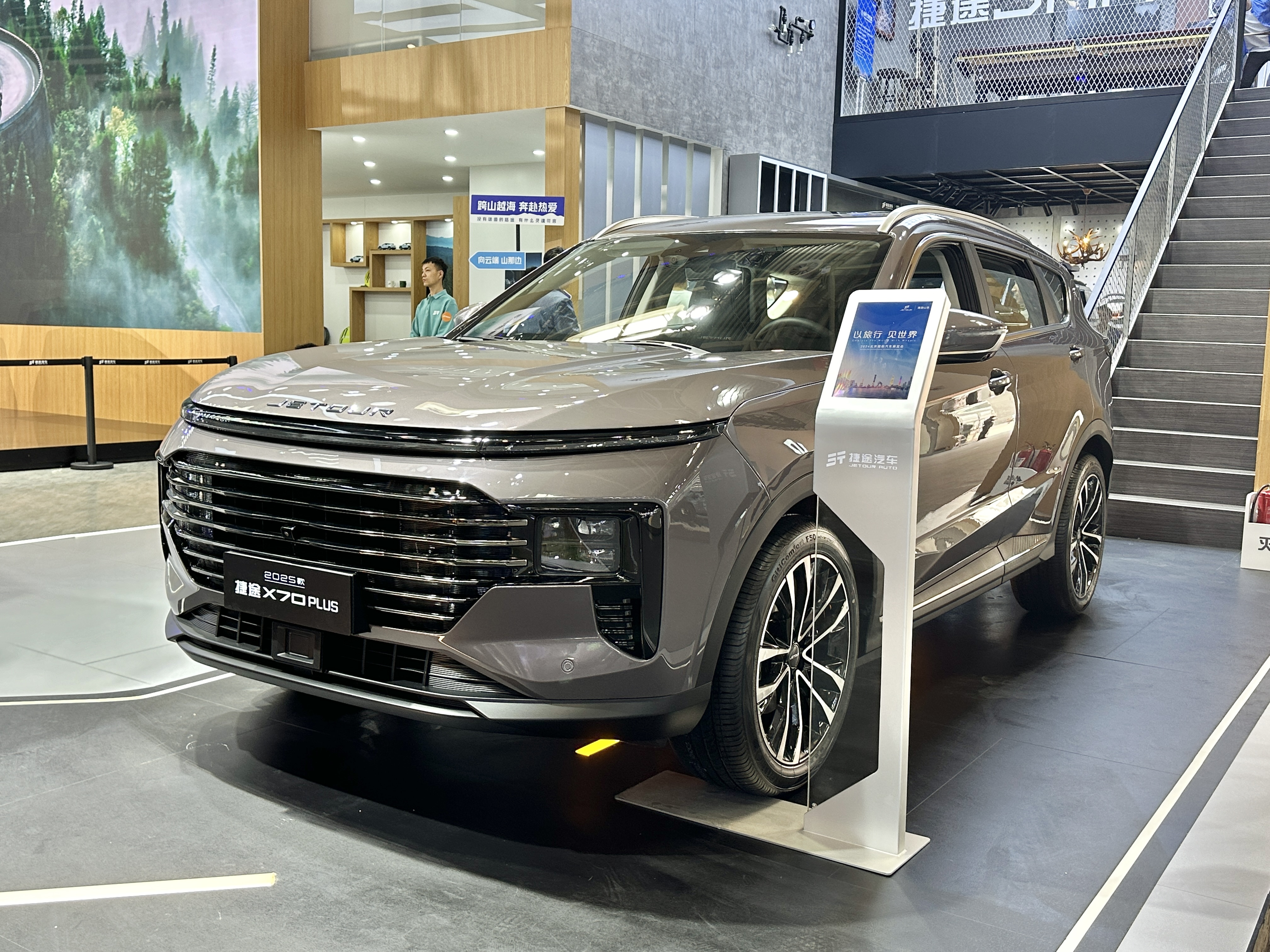
Jetour X70 Plus

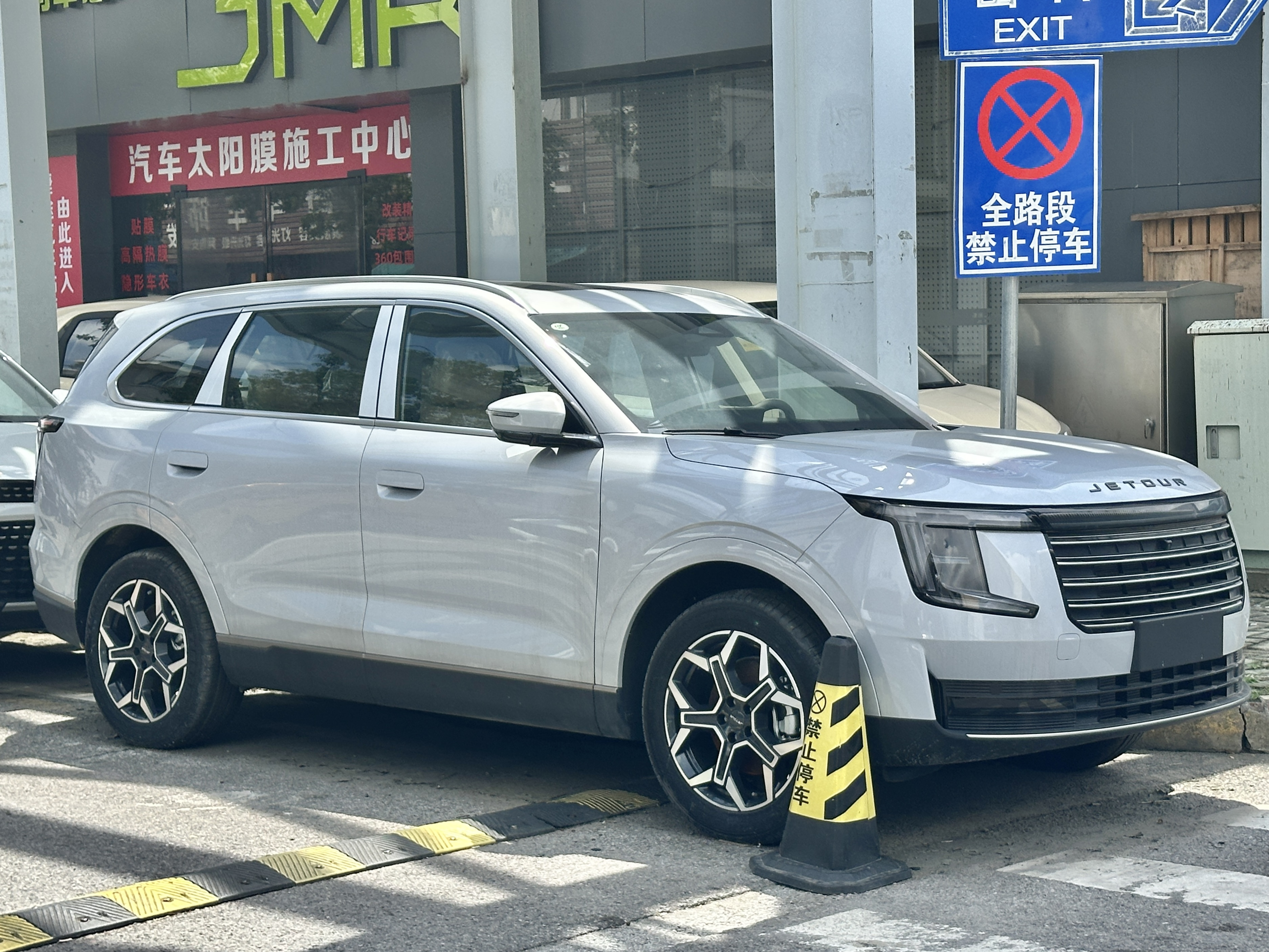
Jetour X70L

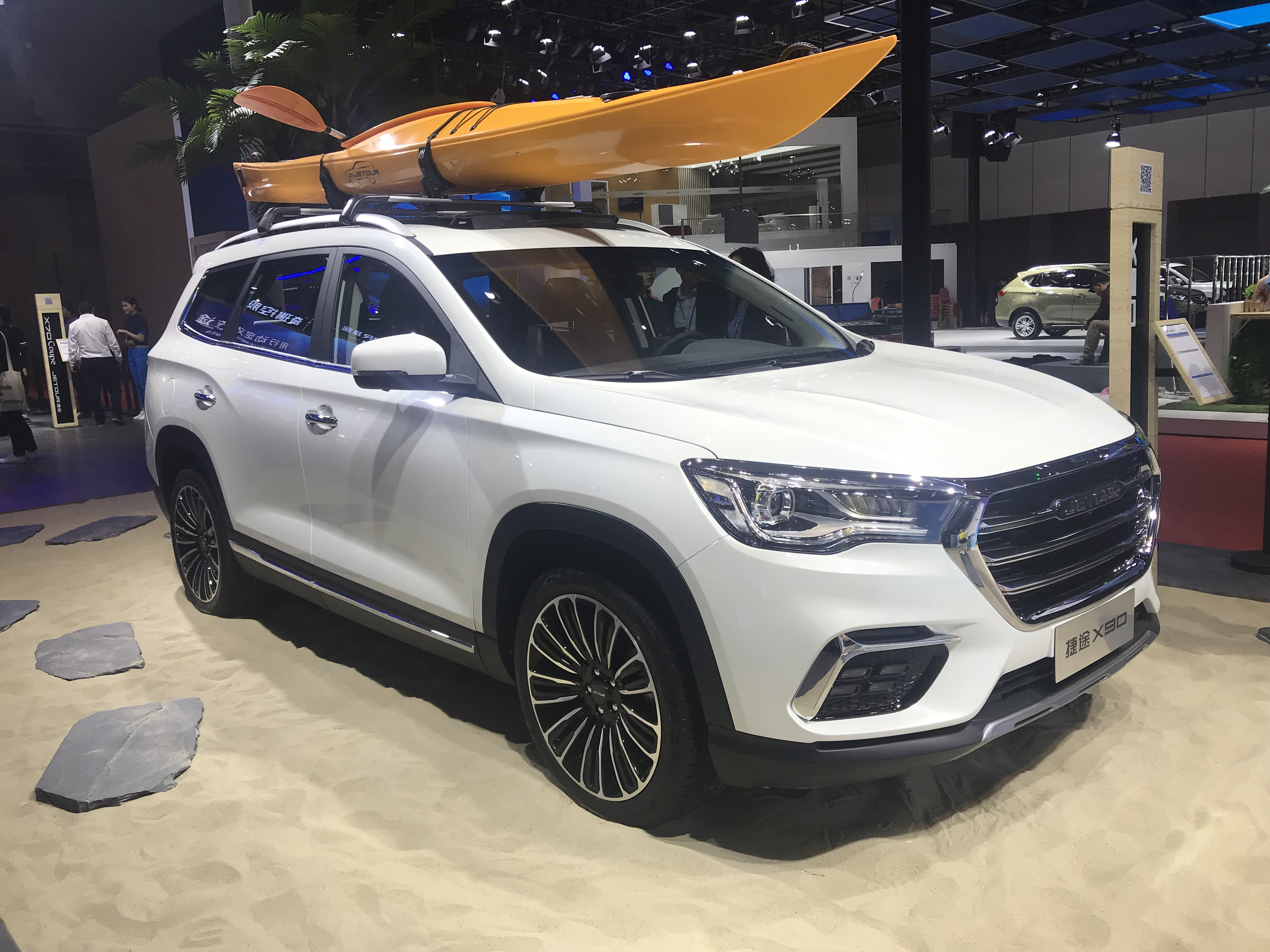
Jetour X90

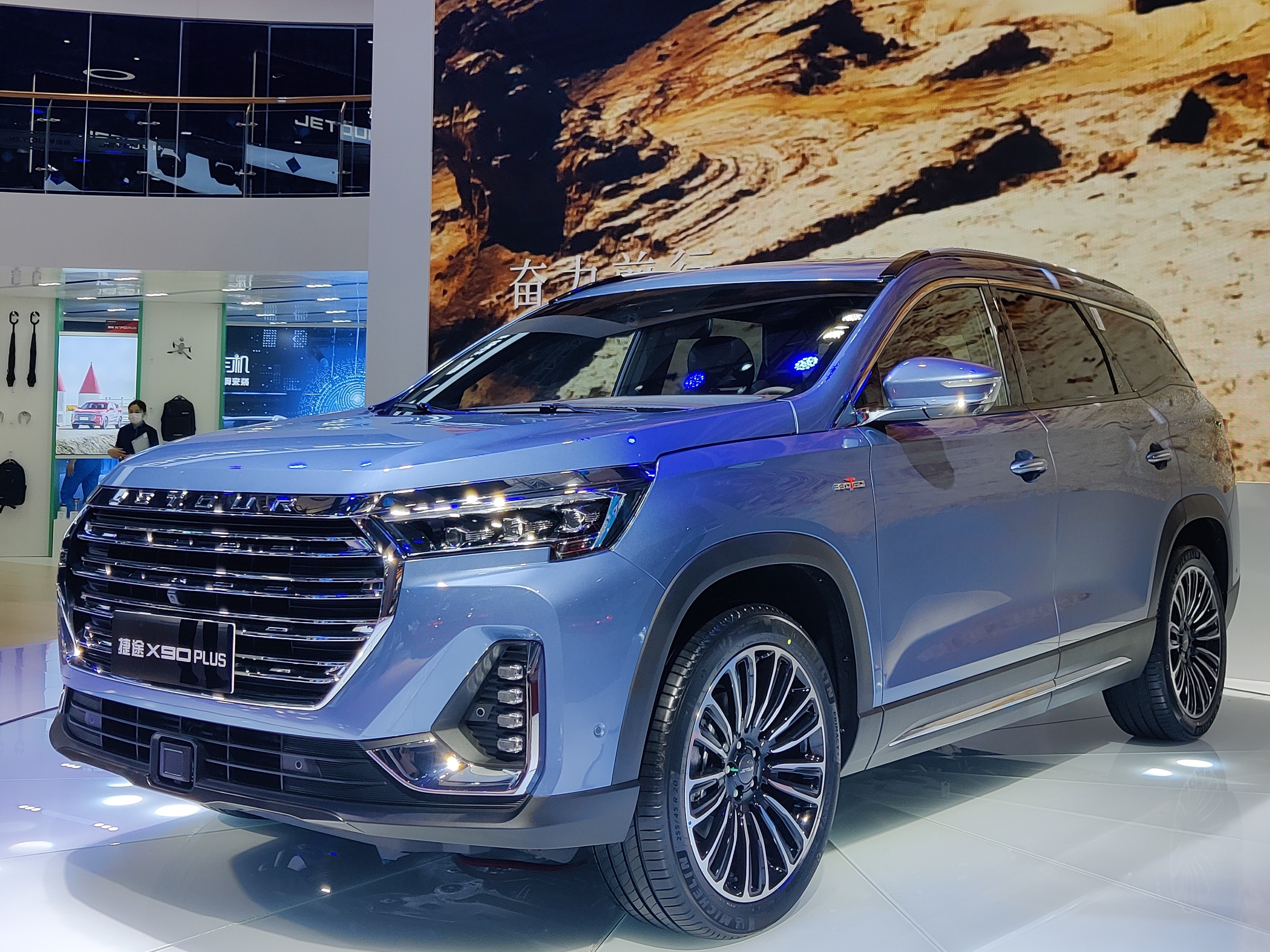
Jetour X90 Plus

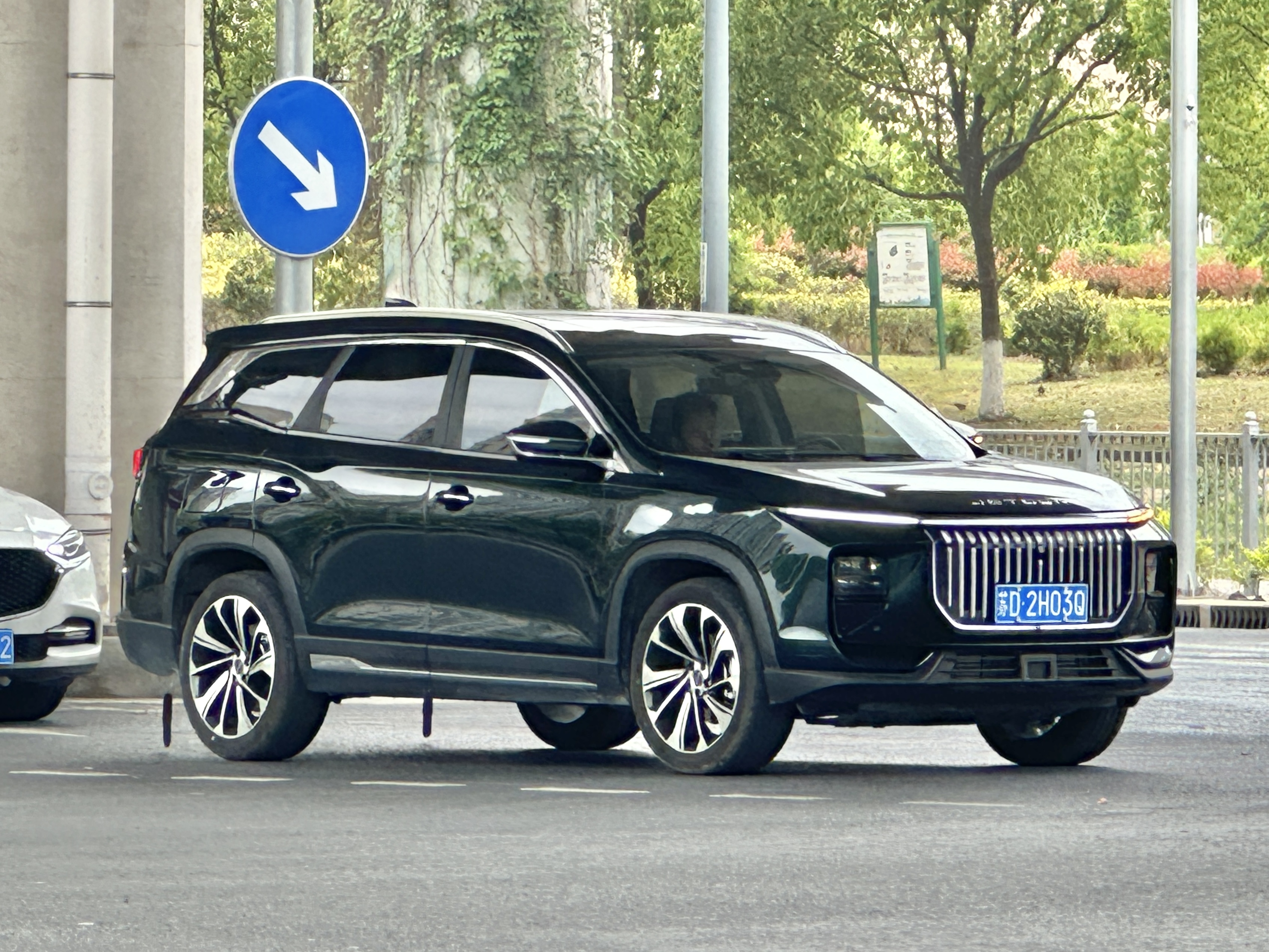
Jetour X90 Pro

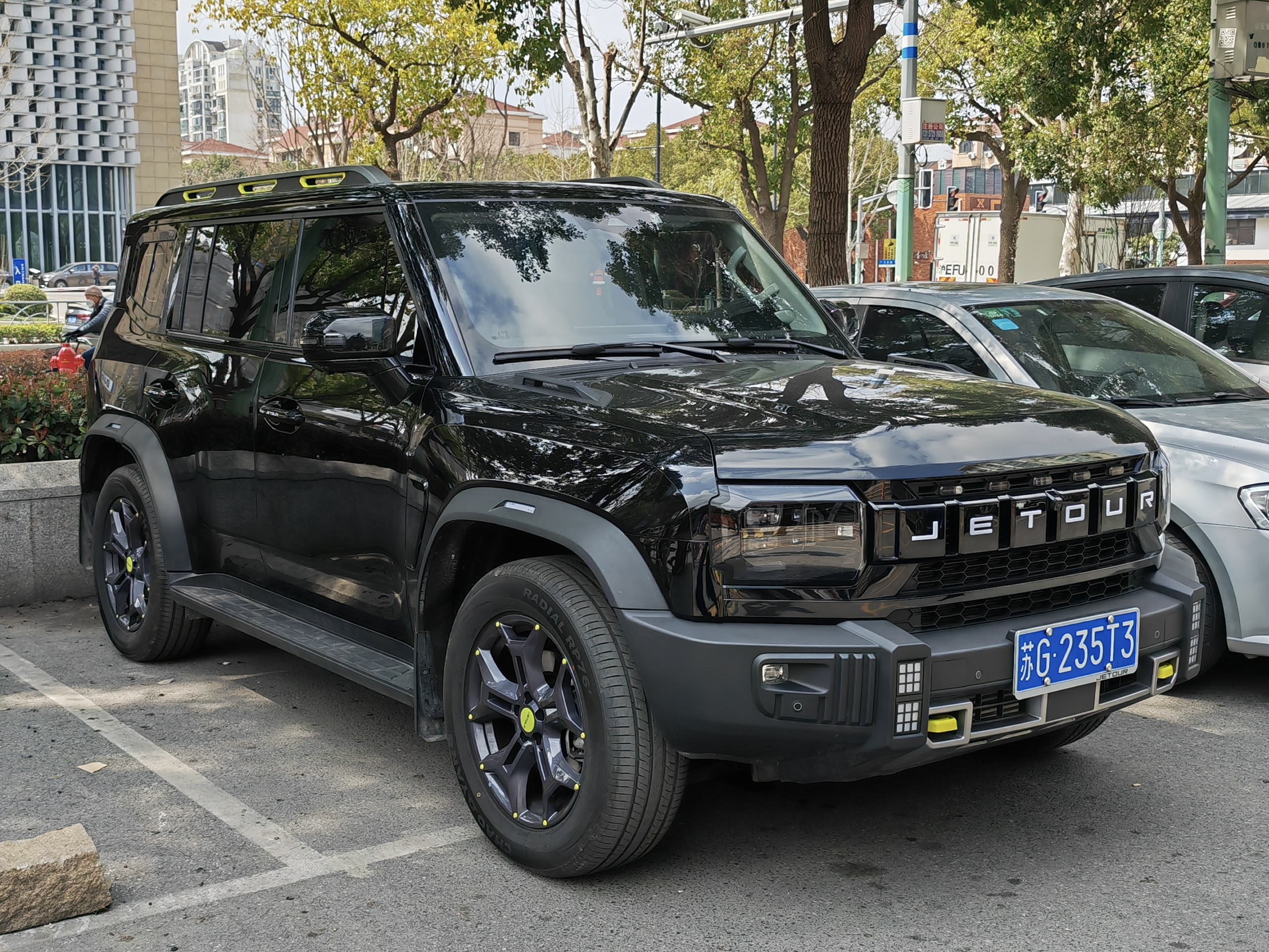
Jetour Traveller

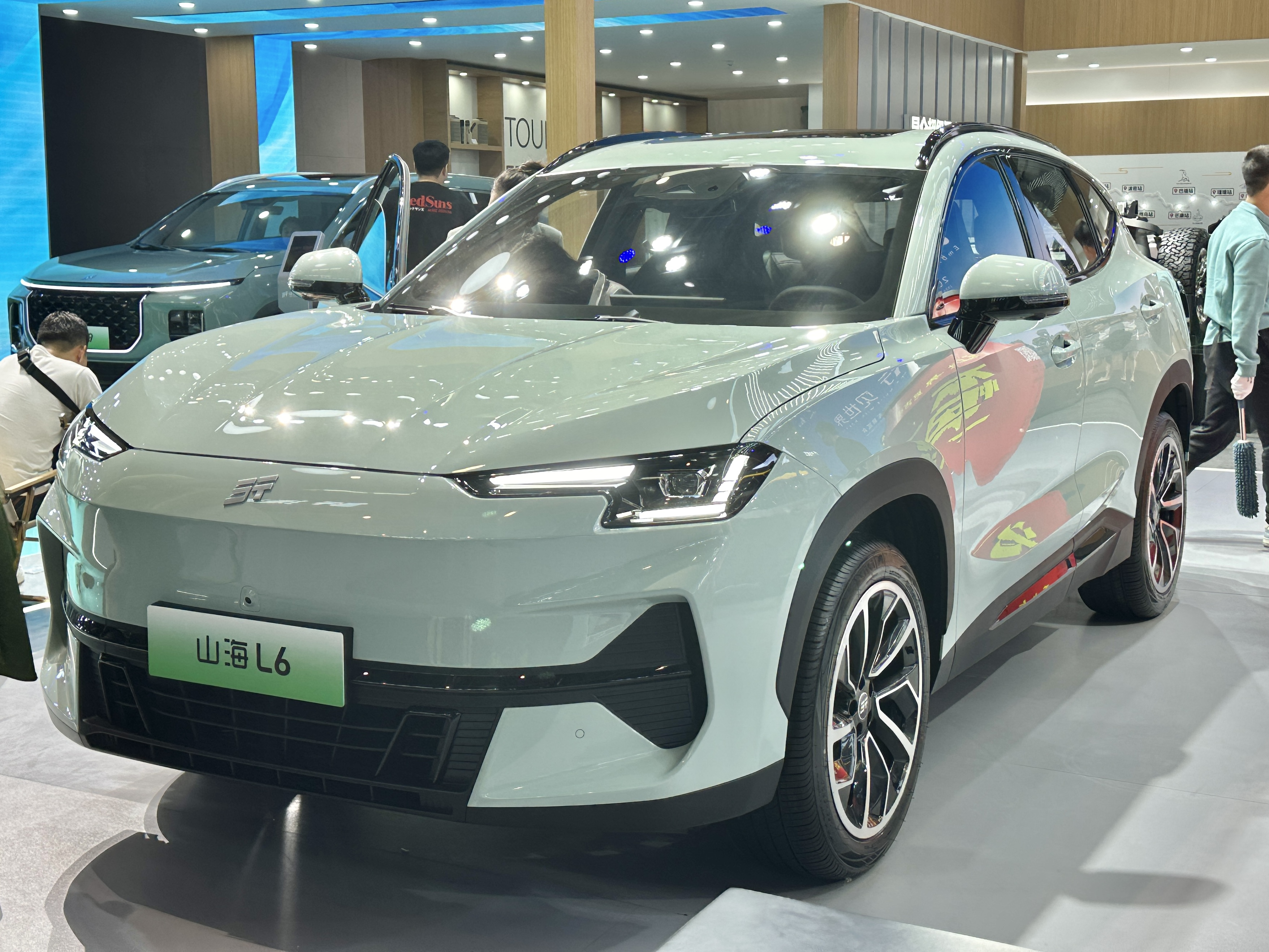
Jetour Shanhai L6

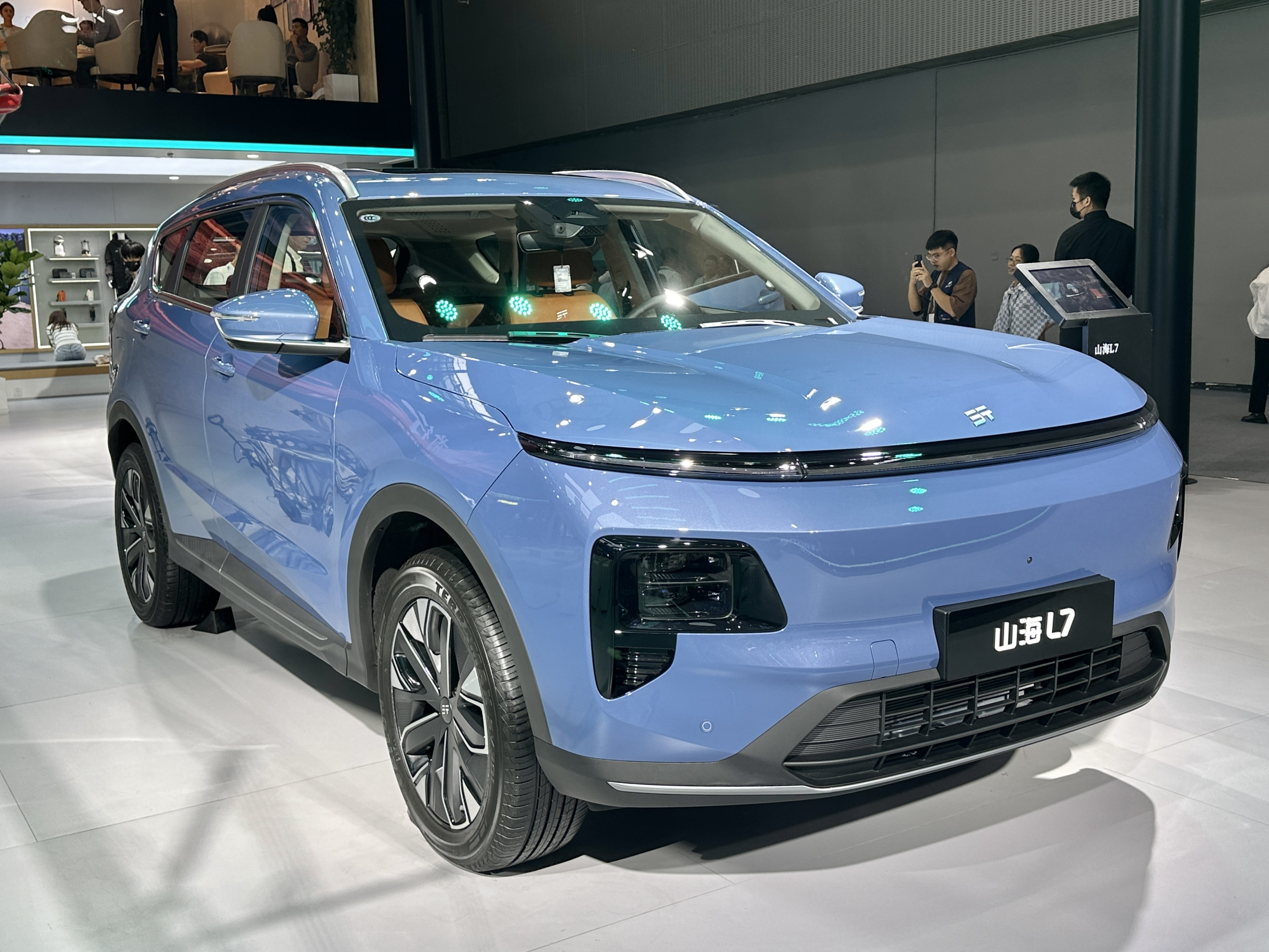
Jetour Shanhai L7

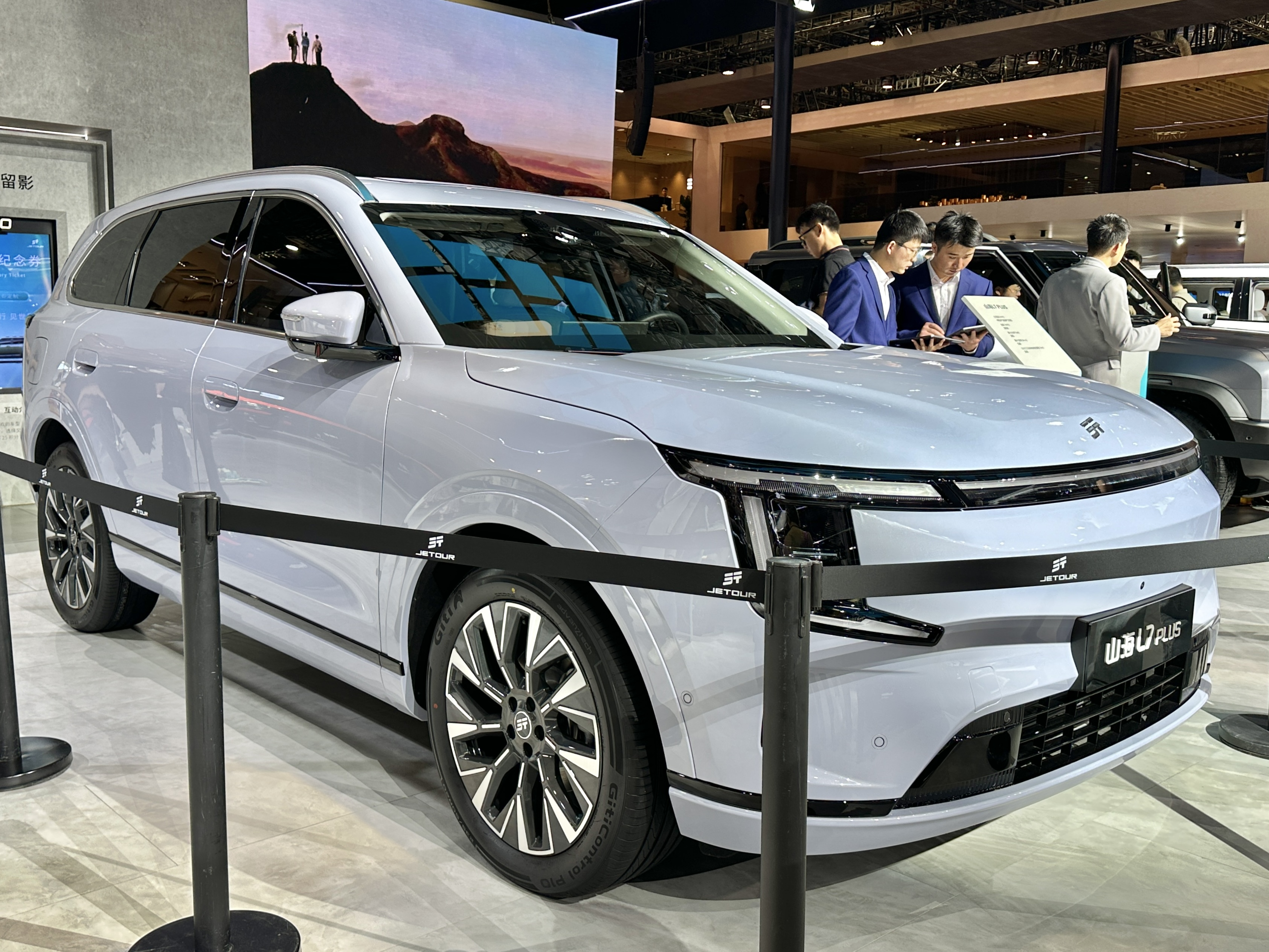
Jetour Shanhai L7 Plus

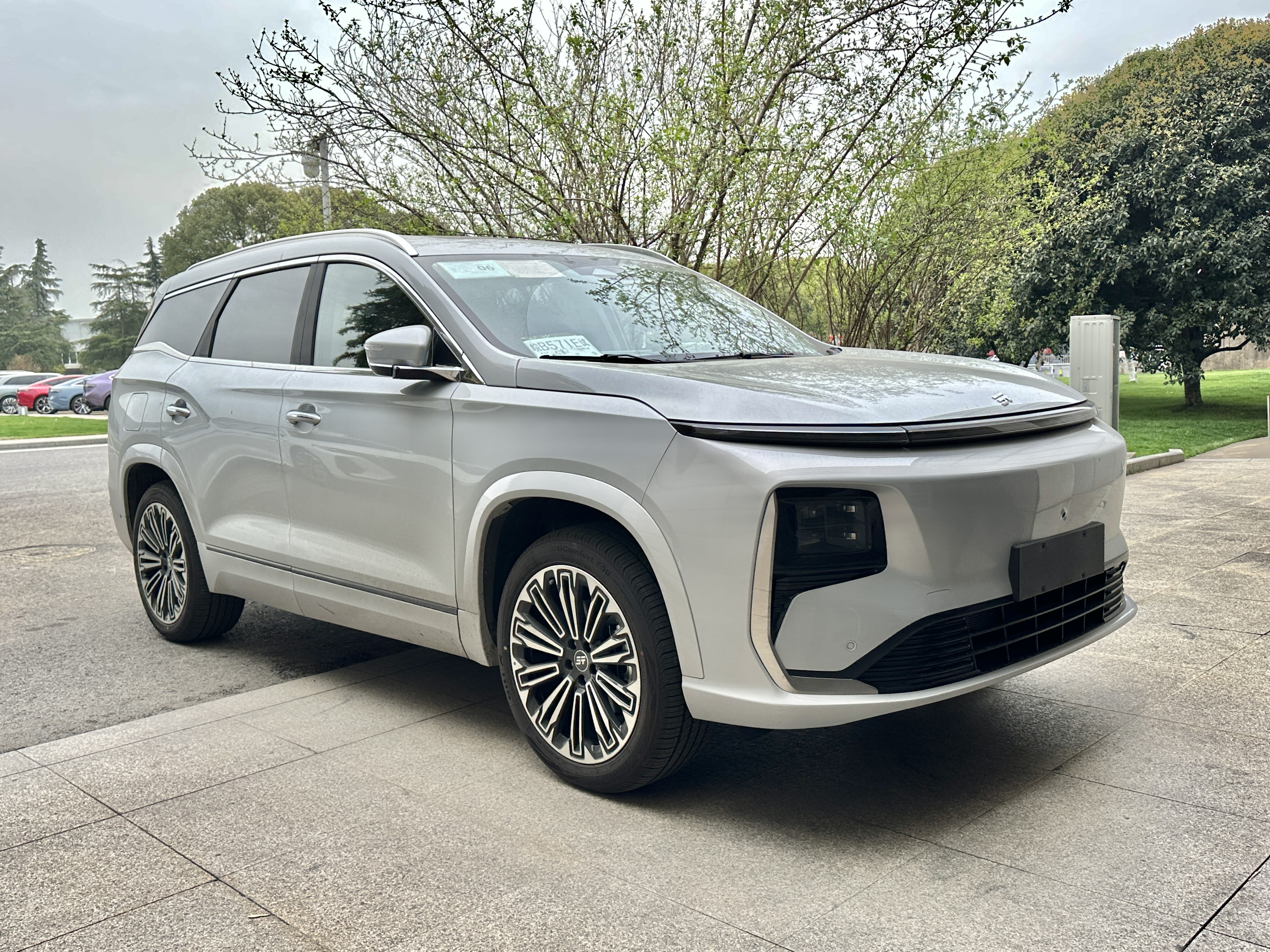
Jetour Shanhai L9

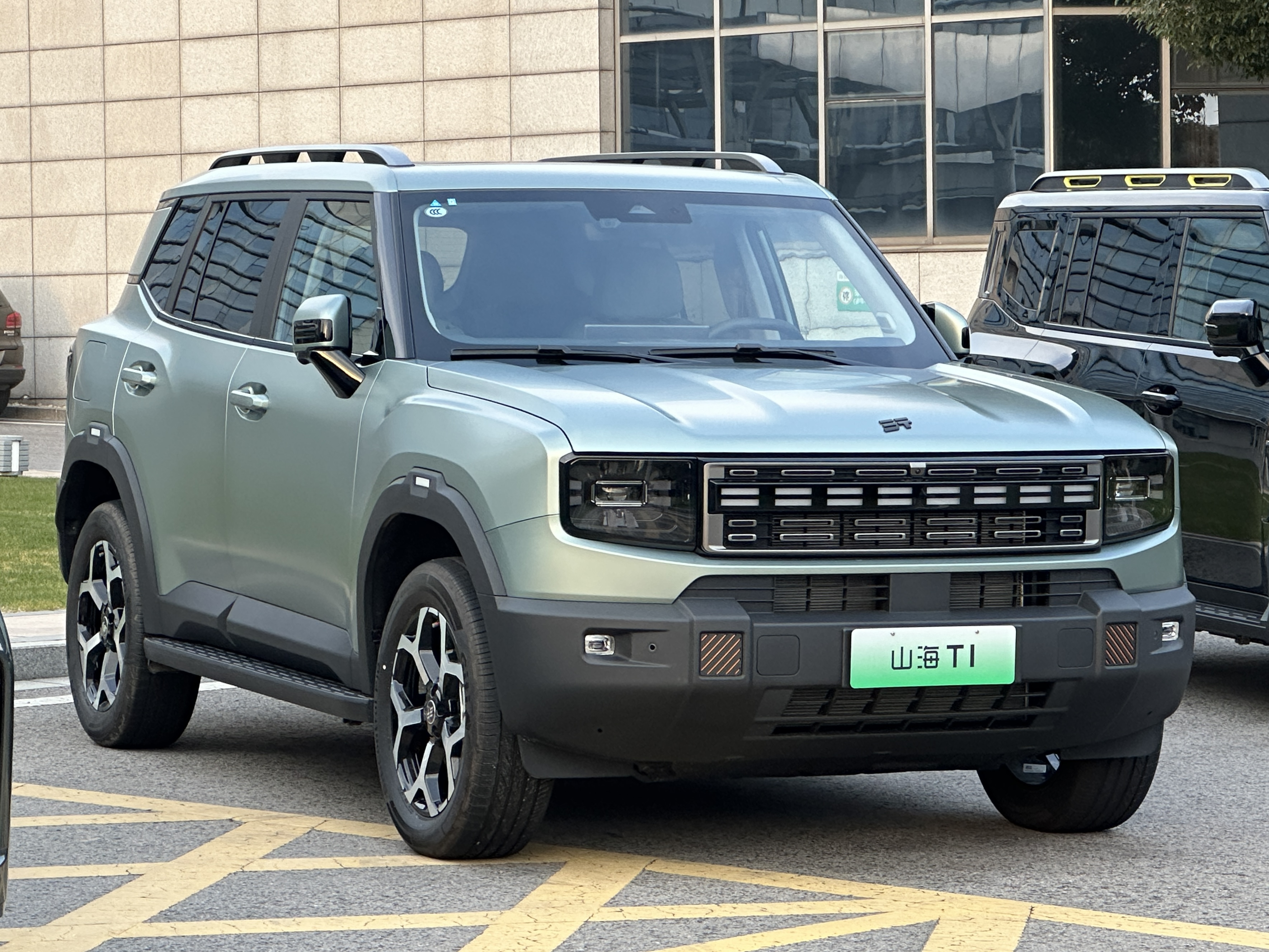
Jetour Shanhai T1

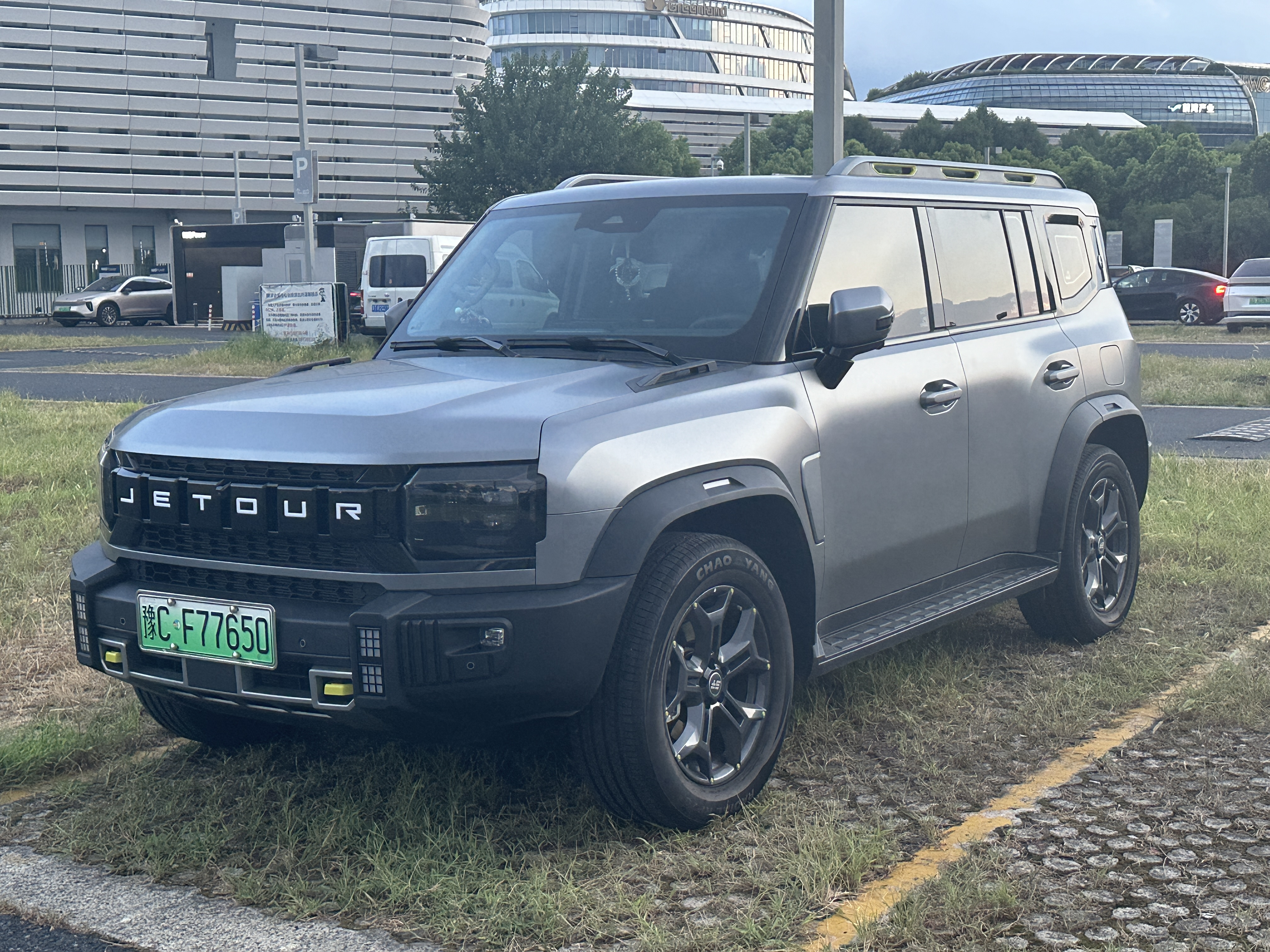
Jetour Shanhai T2

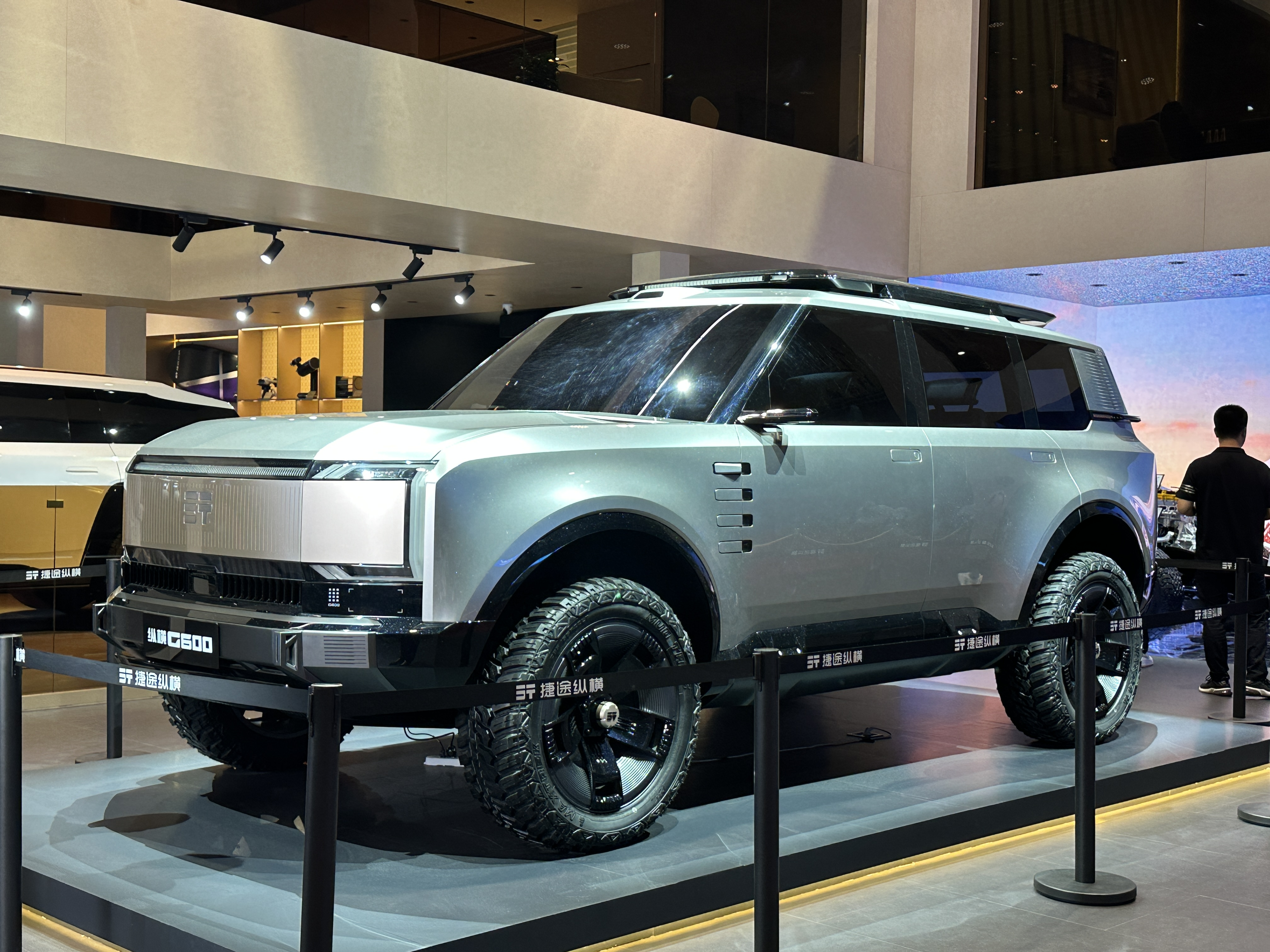
Jetour Zongheng G600

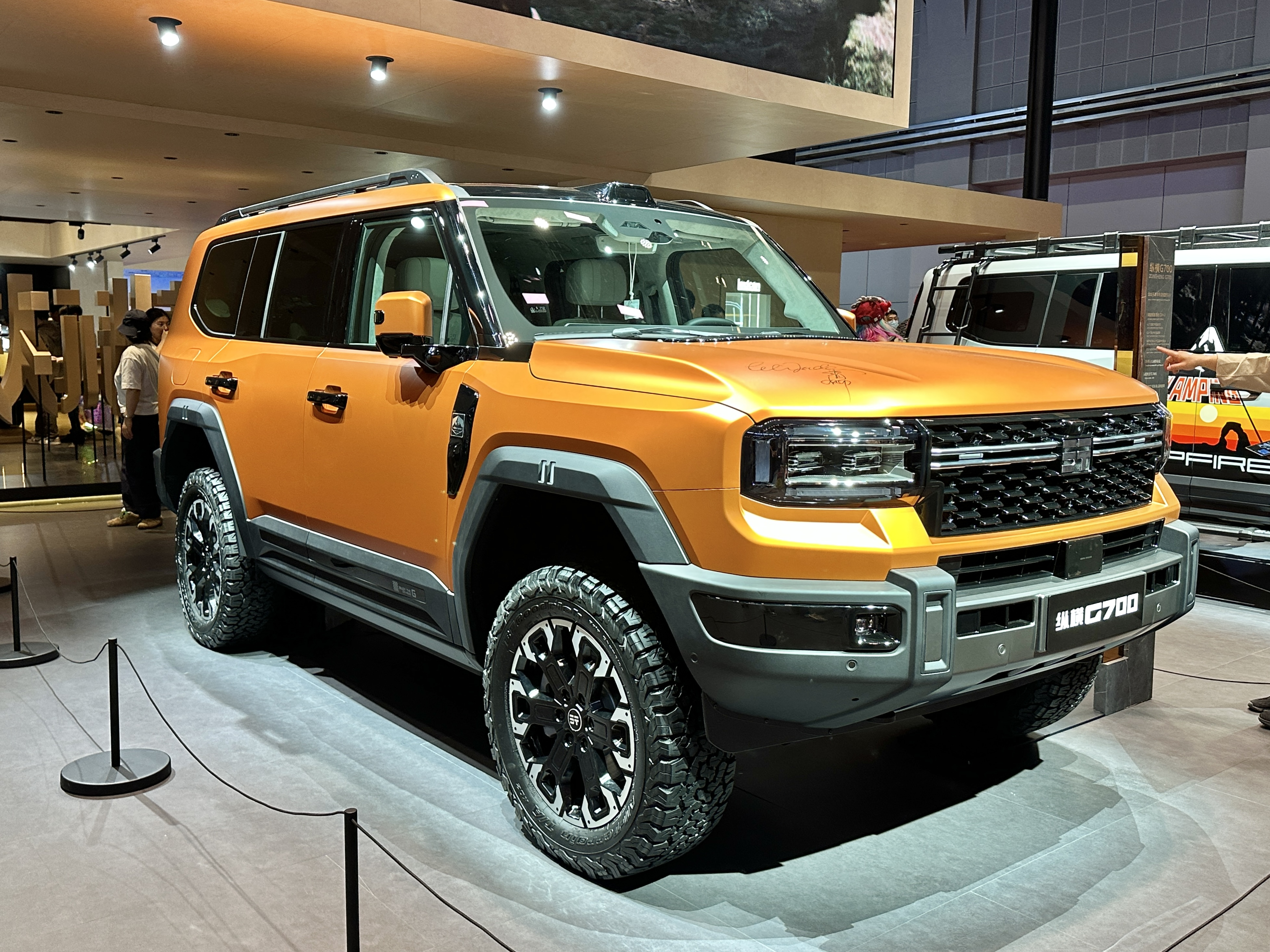
Jetour Zongheng G700

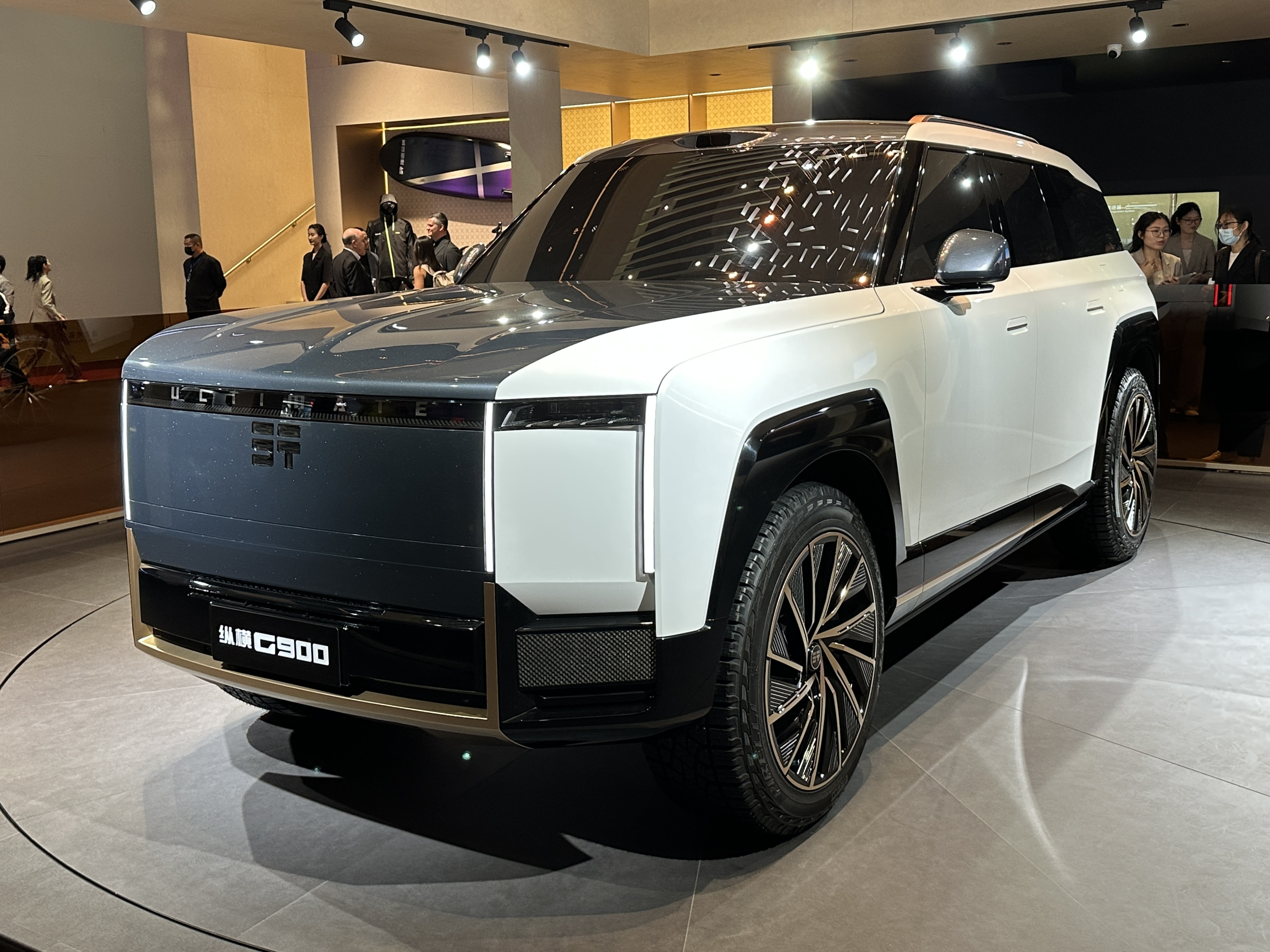
Jetour Zongheng G900

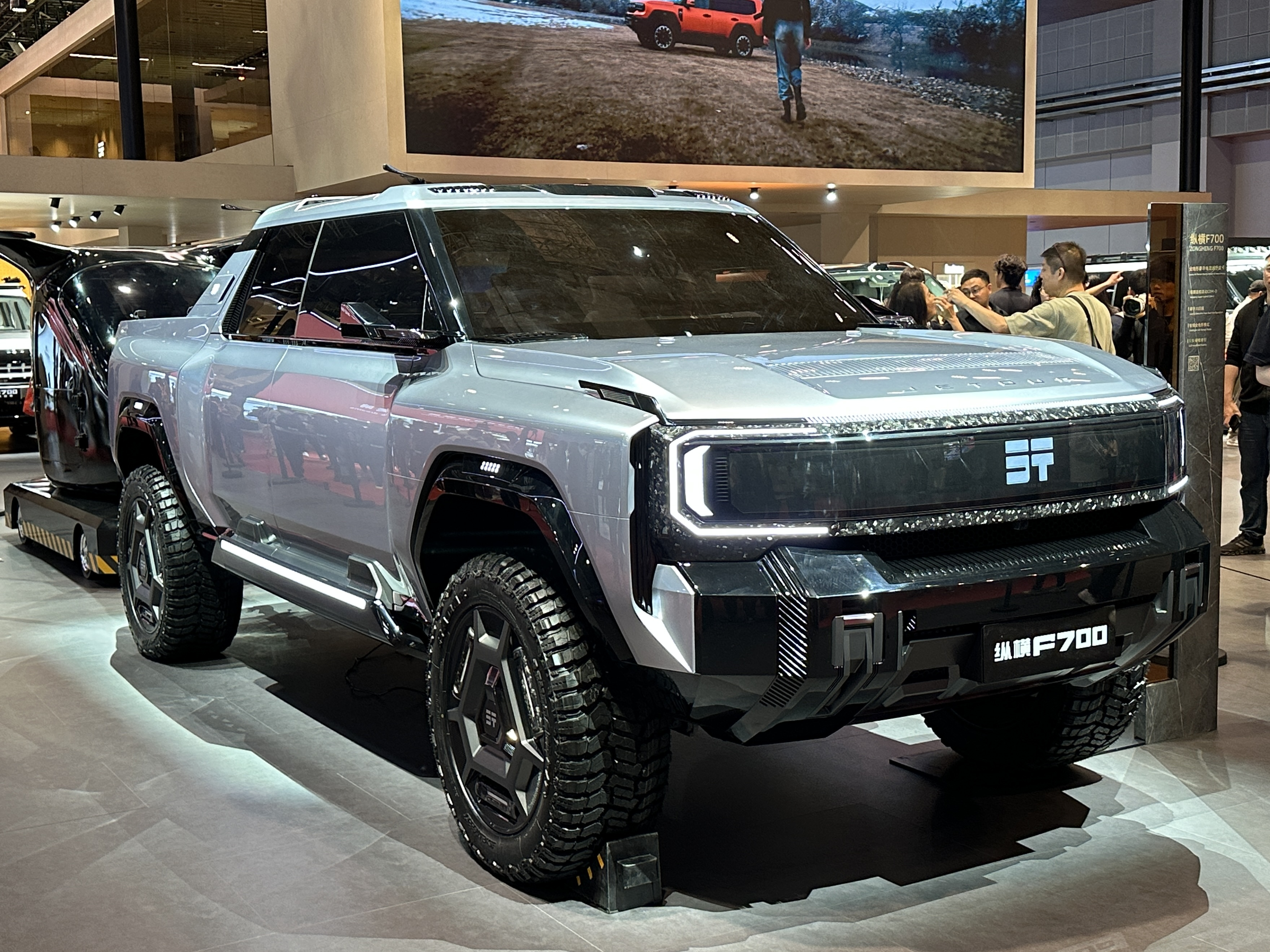
Jetour Zongheng F700

=== Export-only models ===
- Jetour Ice Cream (2023–present), rebadged Chery QQ Ice Cream for the Philippine market
- Jetour X20e (2025), rebadged Kaiyi Shiyue Mate
- Jetour X50 (2024–present), rebadged Soueast DX5
- Jetour X50e/eVT5 (2025–present), rebadged Kaiyi X3 Pro EV
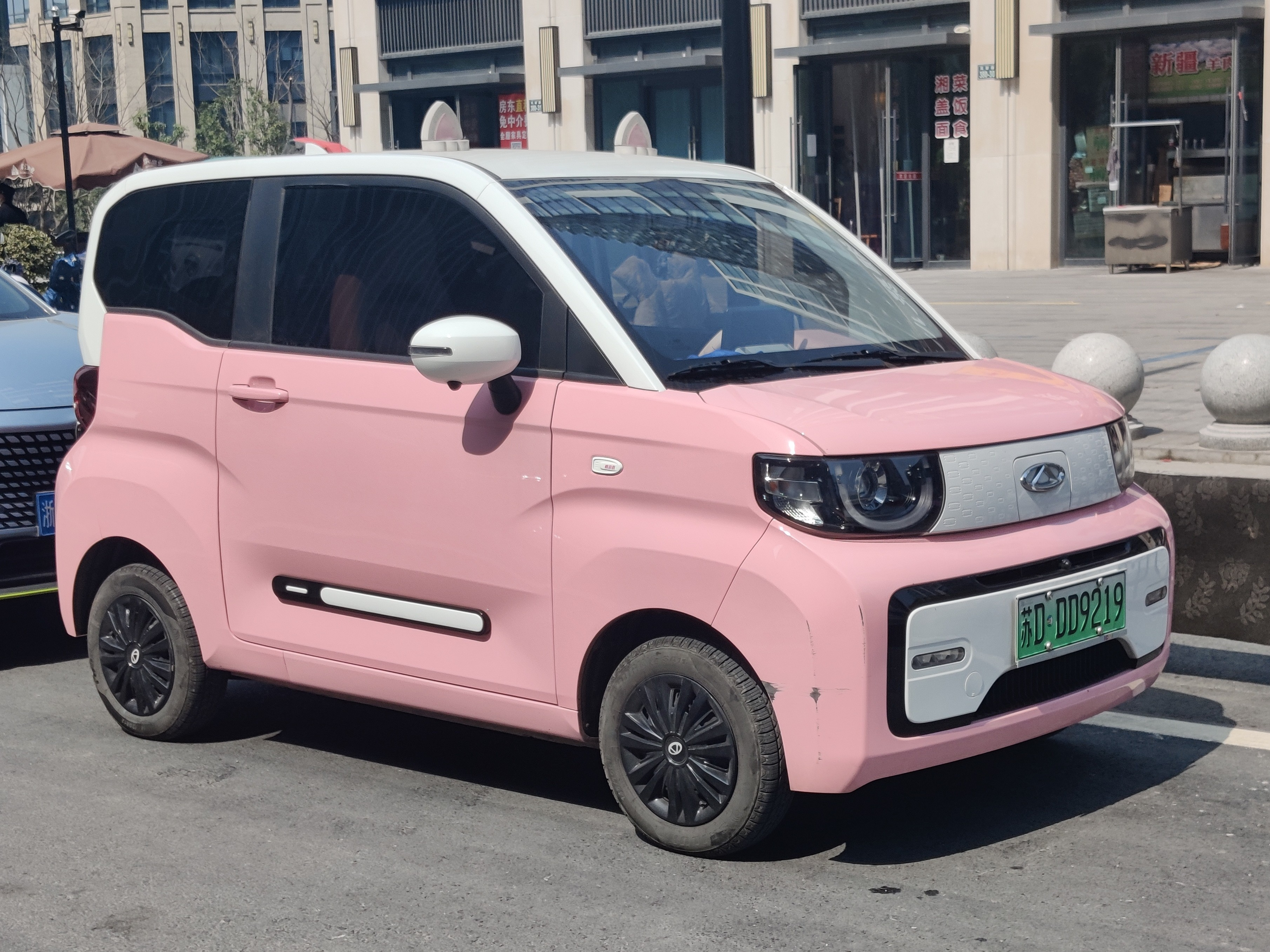
Jetour Ice Cream

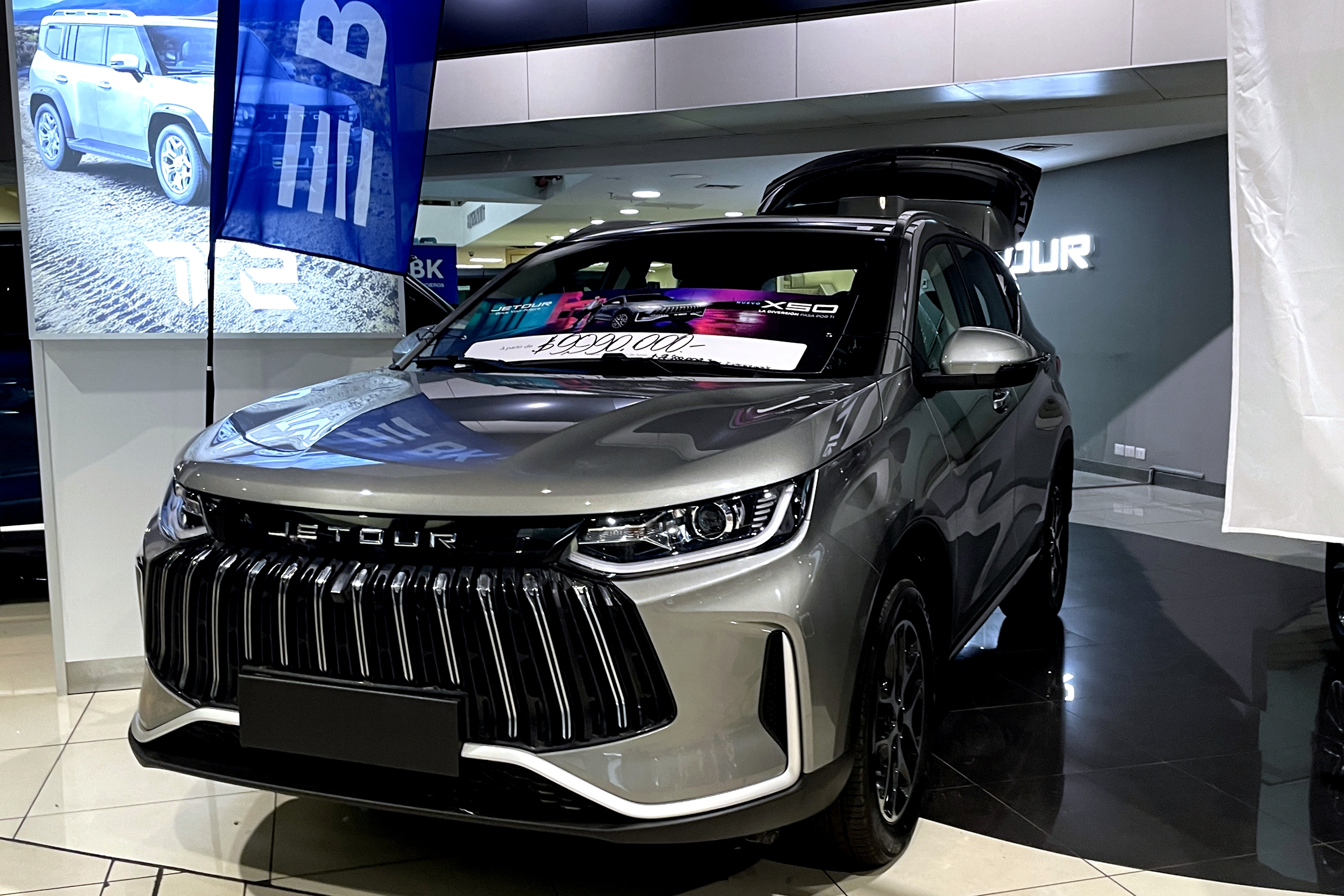
Jetour X50

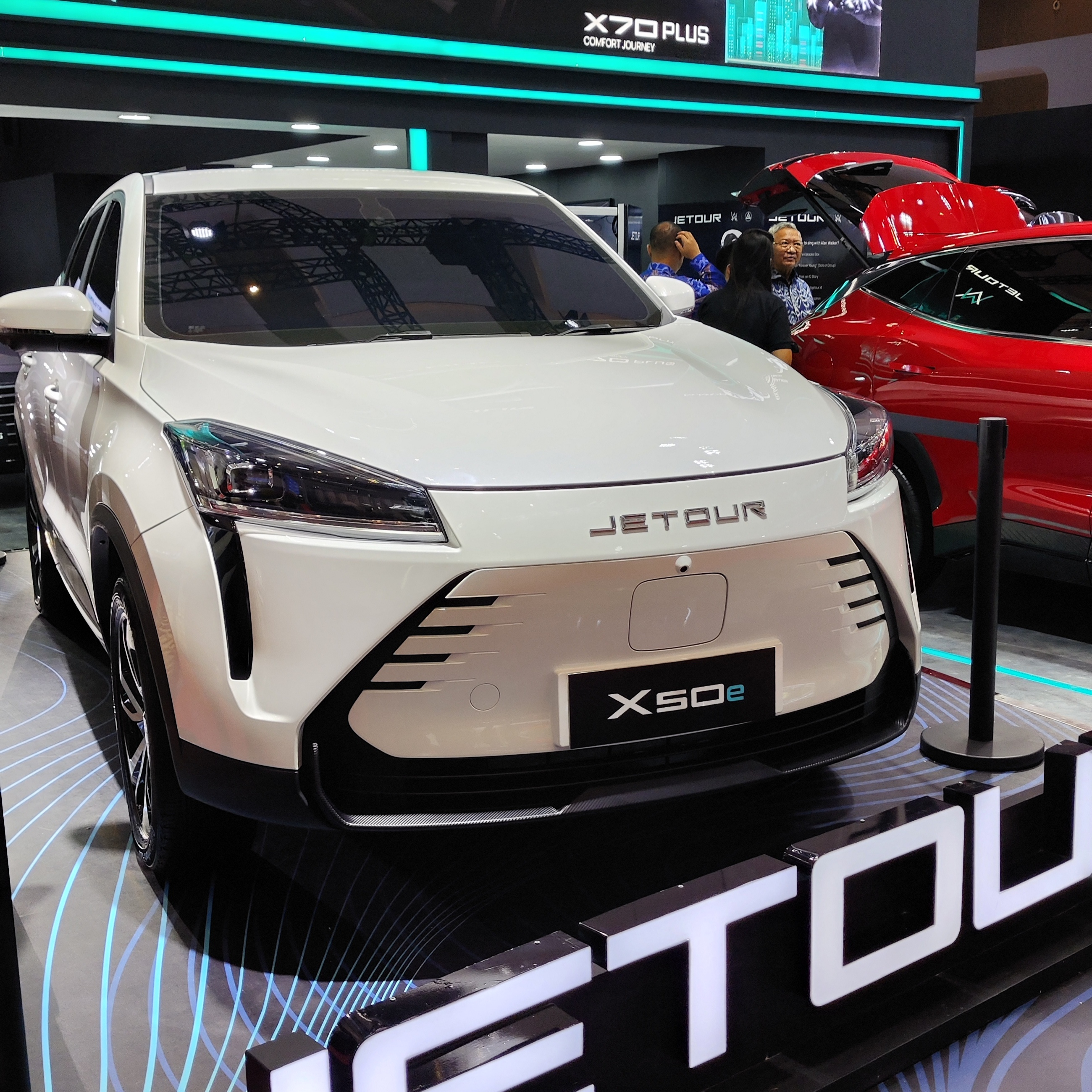
Jetour X50e

=== Discontinued models ===
- Jetour X95 (2019–2024), full-size SUV
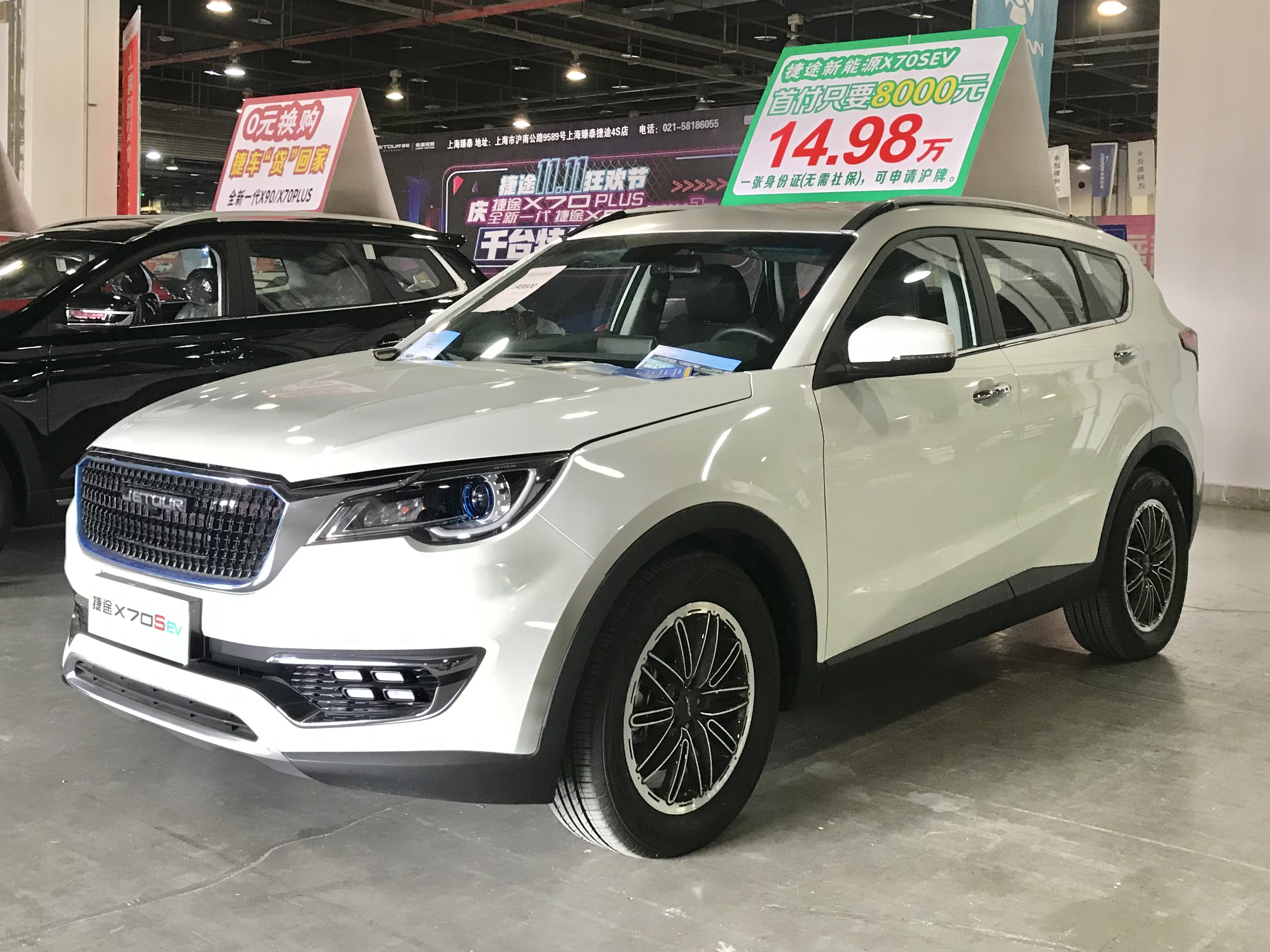
Jetour X70 S

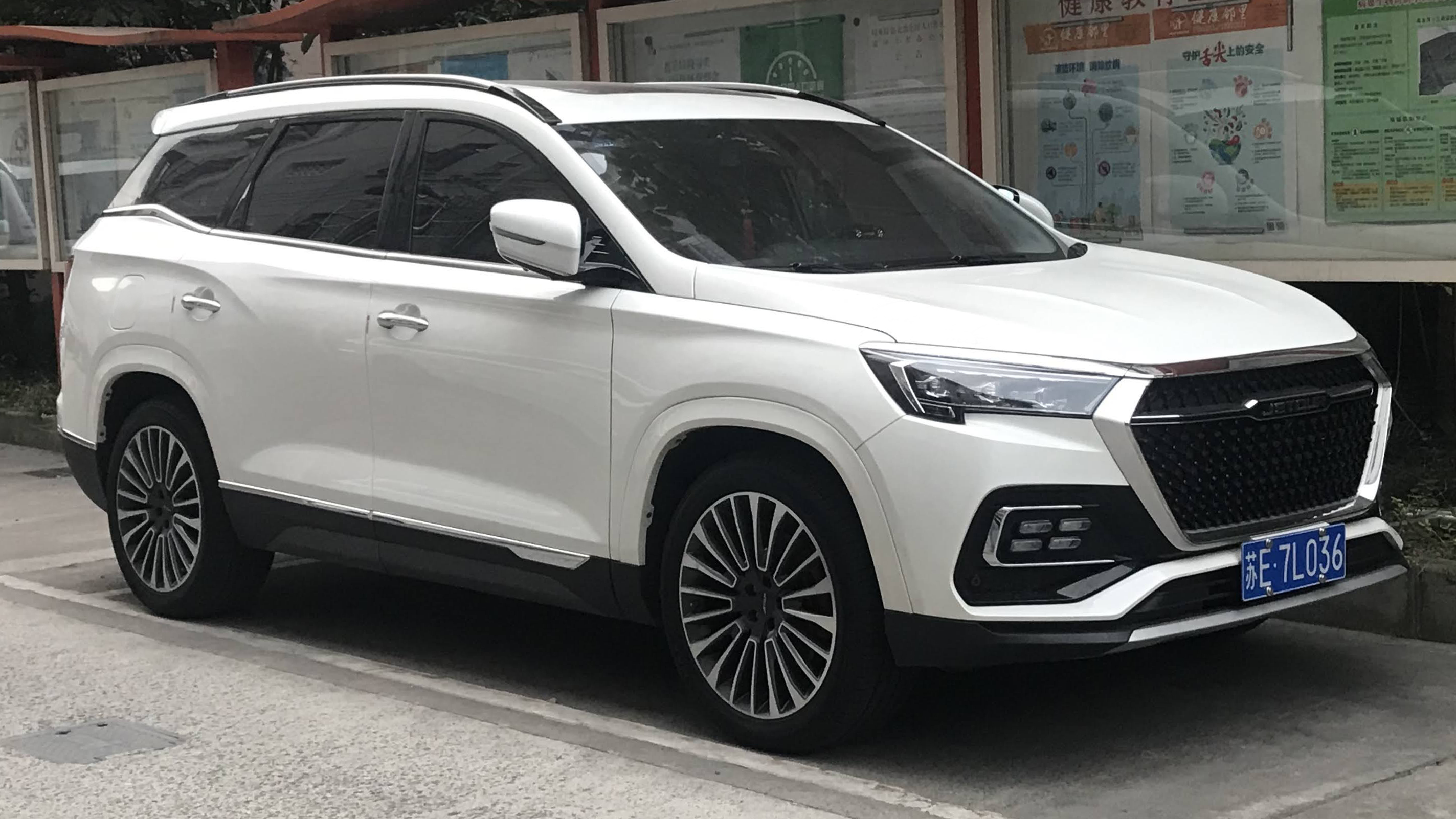
Jetour X95

=== Concepts ===
- Jetour T-X, Jetour Traveller (T-1) concept
- Jetour T-3, quad-motor, 1341 hp, 1600Nm, front and rear suicide doors, 1400 km range EREV

== Vehicle platforms ==
=== Kunlun ===
Kunlun is a car platform used by the Jetour Freedom, Jetour Traveller and Jetour Dashing. It supports BEV, PHEV, EREV for SUVs, off-roaders, and pickup trucks.

=== GAIA ===
This car platform is used in Zongheng vehicles. It stands for Ground Aqua Intelligence Air, the intention is to cover offroad, amphibious, spatial awareness and satellite communications.

== Facilities ==
In April 2024, Jetour acquired a manufacturing plant from Soueast. Located in Fuzhou, Fujian, it has an annual production capacity of 200,000 vehicles.

== Sales ==
| Year | Sales |
|---|---|
| 2018 | 40,007 |
| 2019 | 128,204 |
| 2020 | 126,595 |
| 2021 | 154,035 |
| 2022 | 180,067 |
| 2023 | 315,167 |
| 2024 | 568,387 |
| 2025 | 622,590 |

== See also ==
- Omoda
- Jaecoo
- Exeed
- Luxeed
- iCar
- Karry
- Automobile manufacturers and brands of China
- List of automobile manufacturers of China
