= Soueast DX5 =

Subcompact crossover SUV

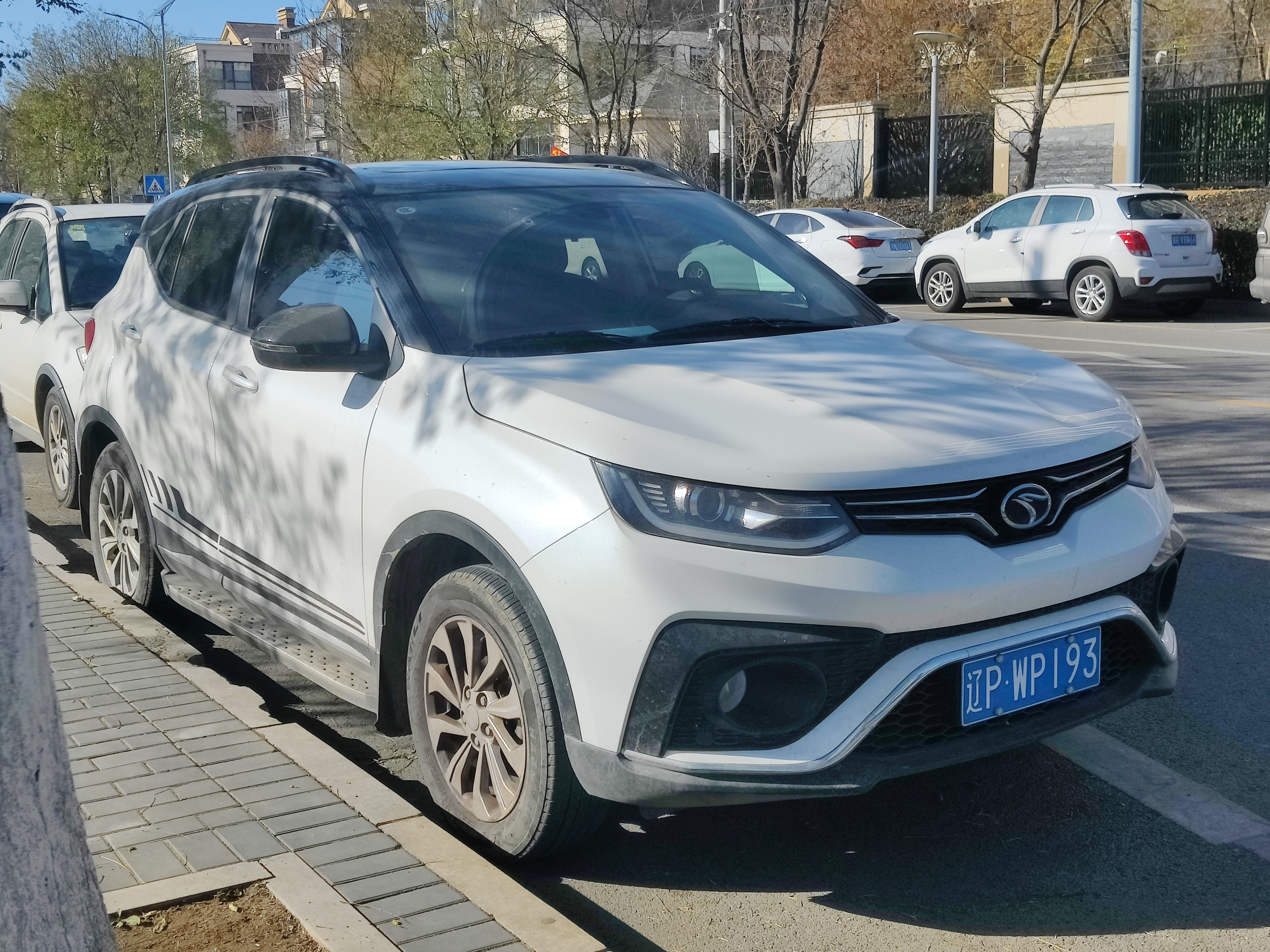
- The Soueast DX5 in Shunyi, Beijing.

Overview
- Manufacturer: Soueast
- Also called: Soueast DX3 (Iran); Jetour X50 (Middle East, Russia, Philippines, Cambodia, Jamaica and Latin America); Soueast S05; Tissan S05 (Iran)
- Production: 2019–2023 (China); 2024–present (export)
- Assembly: China: Fuzhou, Fujian; Iran: Golpayegan (Diar)
- Designer: Yu Chen, Pininfarina

Body and chassis
- Class: Subcompact crossover SUV (B)
- Body style: 5-door SUV
- Layout: Front engine, front wheel drive
- Related: Soueast DX3

Powertrain
- Engine: Petrol: 1.5 L I4; 1.5 L turbo I4
- Transmission: 5-speed manual; 6-speed automatic; 8-speed CVT

Dimensions
- Wheelbase: 2,615 mm (103.0 in)
- Length: 4,406 mm (173.5 in)
- Width: 1,840 mm (72.4 in)
- Height: 1,654 mm (65.1 in)
- Curb weight: 1,485–1,495 kg (3,274–3,296 lb)

The Soueast DX5 is a subcompact crossover SUV designed by Pininfarina and manufactured by Chinese automaker Soueast Motors (2019–2023) under the Jetour brand for the Middle East and the CIS markets from 2024.

== Overview ==
The DX5 was launched during the 2019 Chengdu Auto Show. The DX5 is based on the same platform as the DX3 and slots between the DX3 and DX7 in size. Styling-wise, the DX5 is designed by Pininfarina. The DX5 was launched with a total of six variants with a pre-sale price range of 69,900 to 99,900 yuan (~US$9,774 – US$13,969).

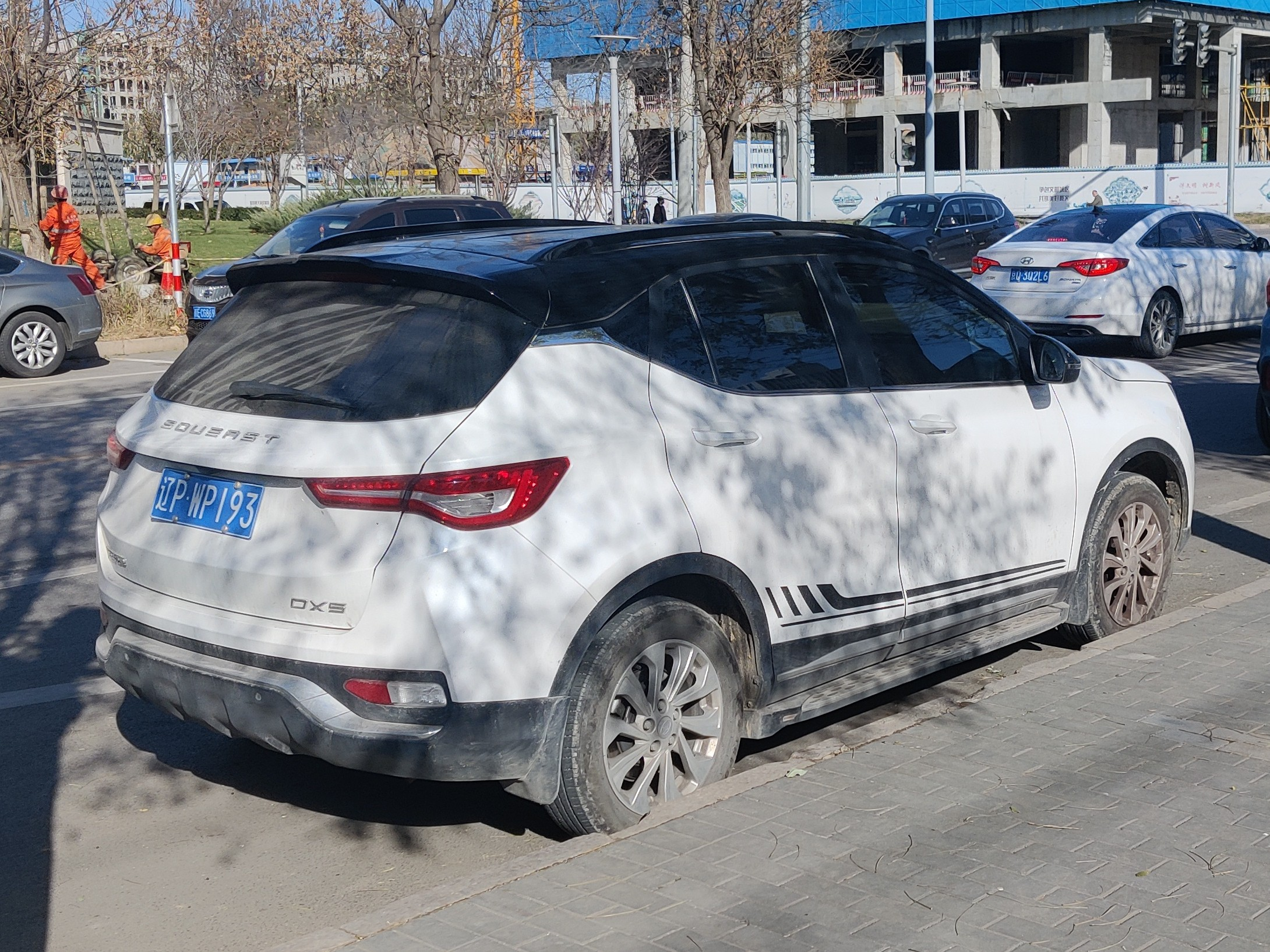
Rear view

== Powertrain ==
The DX5 is powered by a selection of 1.5-liter engine and a 1.5-liter turbo engine. The 1.5-liter engine produces 120 hp and the 1.5-liter turbo engine produces 156 hp. Transmission options are a 5-speed manual transmission, a 6-speed automatic transmission, and a 8-speed simulating CVT.

== Jetour X50 ==
The Jetour X50 is a rebaged variant of the DX5 sold by Jetour in oversea markets. News of a Jetour X50 serving as the entry model of the Jetour brand surfaced as early as May 2021, with camouflaged prototypes being spotted doing road tests. However, the model was unveiled to be renamed to Jetour X-2 during the 2023 Shanghai Auto Show which later became the Jetour Shanhai L6 and Jetour Dashing 2024 model year facelift.

In 2022, the Soueast Motor began a significant partnership with Chery Automobile to revitalize its product lineup, which was experiencing declining sales and aging models. This collaboration, which began in 2022, saw Soueast adopting Chery's technology and platform sharing, often through "badge-engineering" or rebadging Chery models (specifically from the Jetour brand) as new Soueast vehicles. At the same time, Soueast models were rebadged to become Jetour models as well, with the Soueast DX5 receiving a facelift restyle to become the Jetour X50.

The powertrain of the Jetour X50 is a 1.5 liter turbo inline-4 developing a maximum power output of 156hp (115kW) mated to a 6-speed dual clutch transmission. The Soueast DX5-based Jetour X50 was launched in oversea markets such as Malaysia from early 2024. In the Philippines, the Jetour X50 was launched in October 2024. In Nigeria, the Jetour X50 was launched by Jetour Nigeria in 2025.

The Jetour X50 is also available in the Iranian market; however, in the Iranian market, this car is known as the Tissan S05. The Tissan S05 is assembled at the Diar Khodro factory located in Gholpayegan, Isfahan Province, Iran, and its supplier is Sanyar Motor Parsian Company.

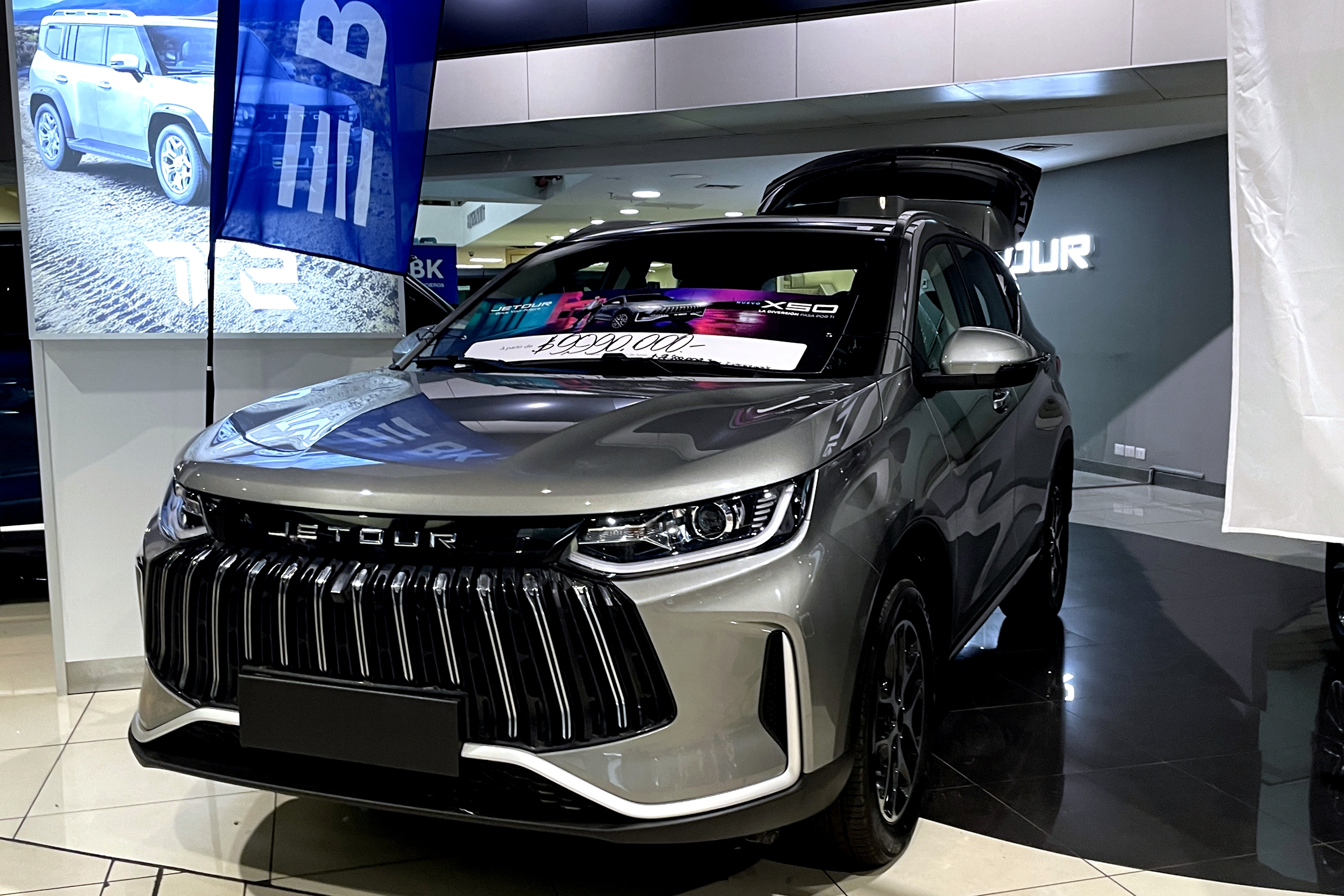
The Jetour X50 in Chile.

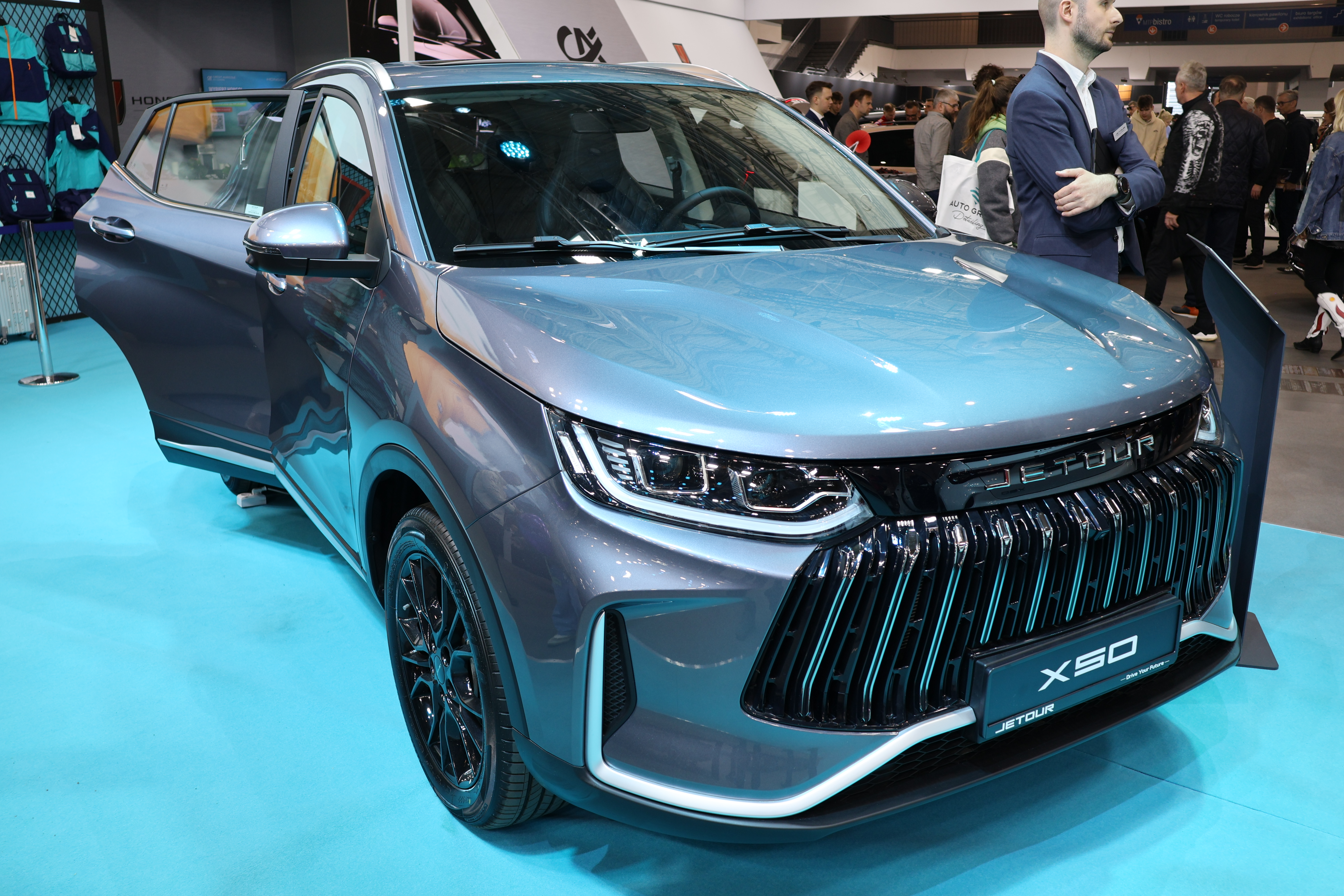
The Jetour X50 in Poland.

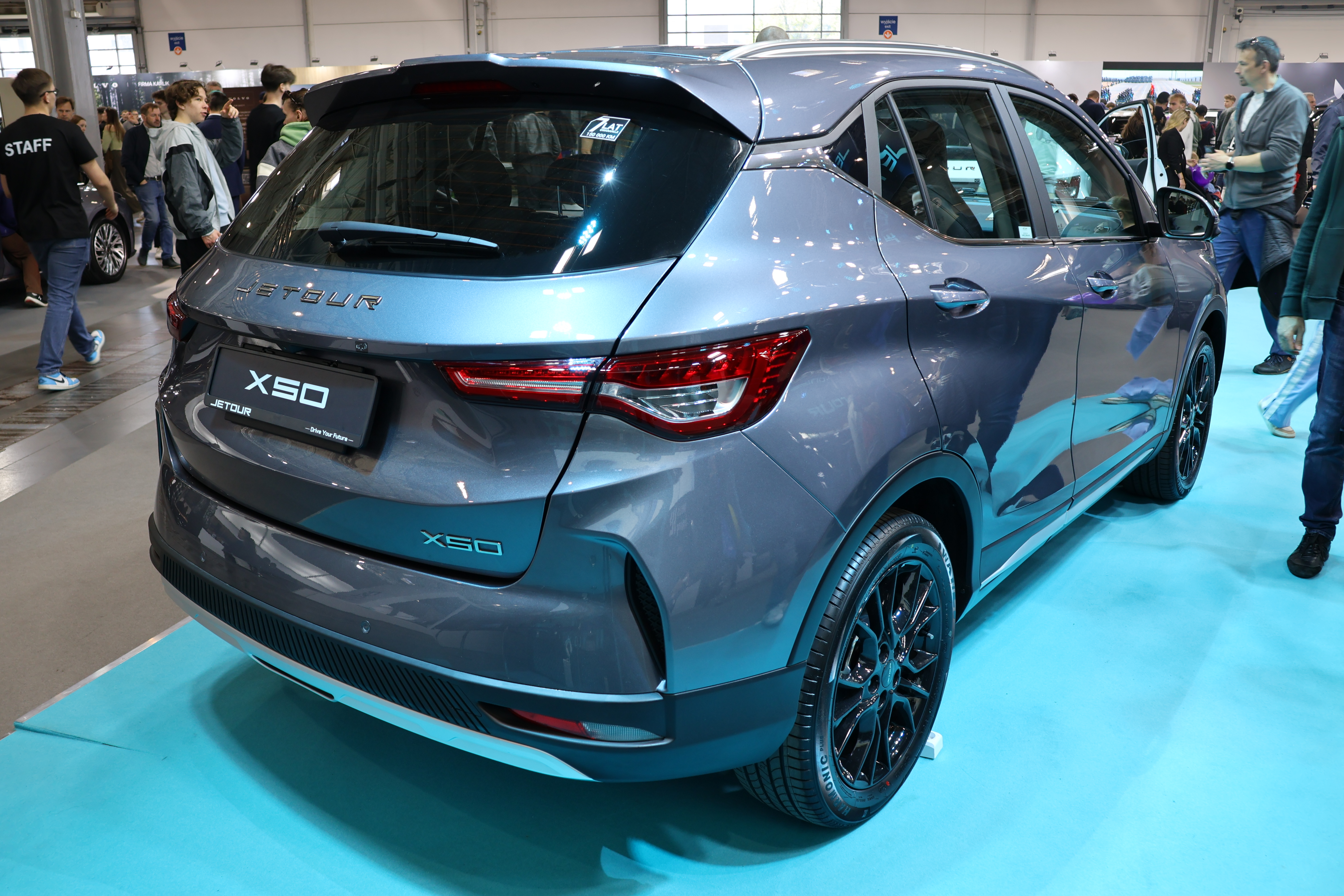
Rear view
