= Soueast DX3 =

Subcompact crossover SUV

Overview
- Manufacturer: Soueast
- Also called: Jetour X70M
- Production: 2016–2023; 2026–present
- Assembly: China: Fuzhou, Fujian
- Designer: Pininfarina

Body and chassis
- Class: Subcompact crossover SUV
- Body style: 5-door SUV
- Layout: Front-engine, front-wheel drive
- Related: Soueast DX5

Powertrain
- Engine: Petrol: 1.5 L 4A91 I4; 1.5 L 4A91T turbo I4; 1.5 L SQRE4T15C turbo I4
- Transmission: 5-speed manual; 8-speed CVT; 6-speed manual; 6-speed Getrag DCT

Dimensions
- Wheelbase: 2,610 mm (102.8 in)
- Length: 4,354 mm (171.4 in); 4,400 mm (173.2 in) (X70M)
- Width: 1,840 mm (72.4 in)
- Height: 1,654 mm (65.1 in); 1,690 mm (66.5 in) (X70M)
- Curb weight: 1,285–1,410 kg (2,833–3,109 lb)

The Soueast DX3 is a subcompact crossover SUV designed by Pininfarina and manufactured by Chinese automaker Soueast Motors. In 2026 it was updated and rebadged as the Jetour X70M (Chinese: 捷途X70M; pinyin: jiétú X70M).

== Overview ==
The DX3 was launched during the 2016 Beijing Auto Show, while the production version of the DX3 crossover debuted on the 2016 Chengdu Auto Show with the official market launch in November 2016.

There are two engines originated from Mitsubishi available including a 1.5-liter engine producing 103 hp (77 kW; 104 PS) at 6,000 rpm and 143 N⋅m (105 lb⋅ft) at 4,000 rpm, and the turbocharged variant with 134 hp (100 kW; 136 PS) at 5,600 rpm and 220 N⋅m (162 lb⋅ft) at 2,000–4,000 rpm. It is available with either a 5-speed manual or a CVT with 8 simulated gears. Pricing ranges from 72,900 yuan to 99,900 yuan.

An electric version called the DX3 EV400 is also available launched on the Chinese car market in November 2017. The price including subsidies of the DX3 EV will start from around $17,000.

Rear view

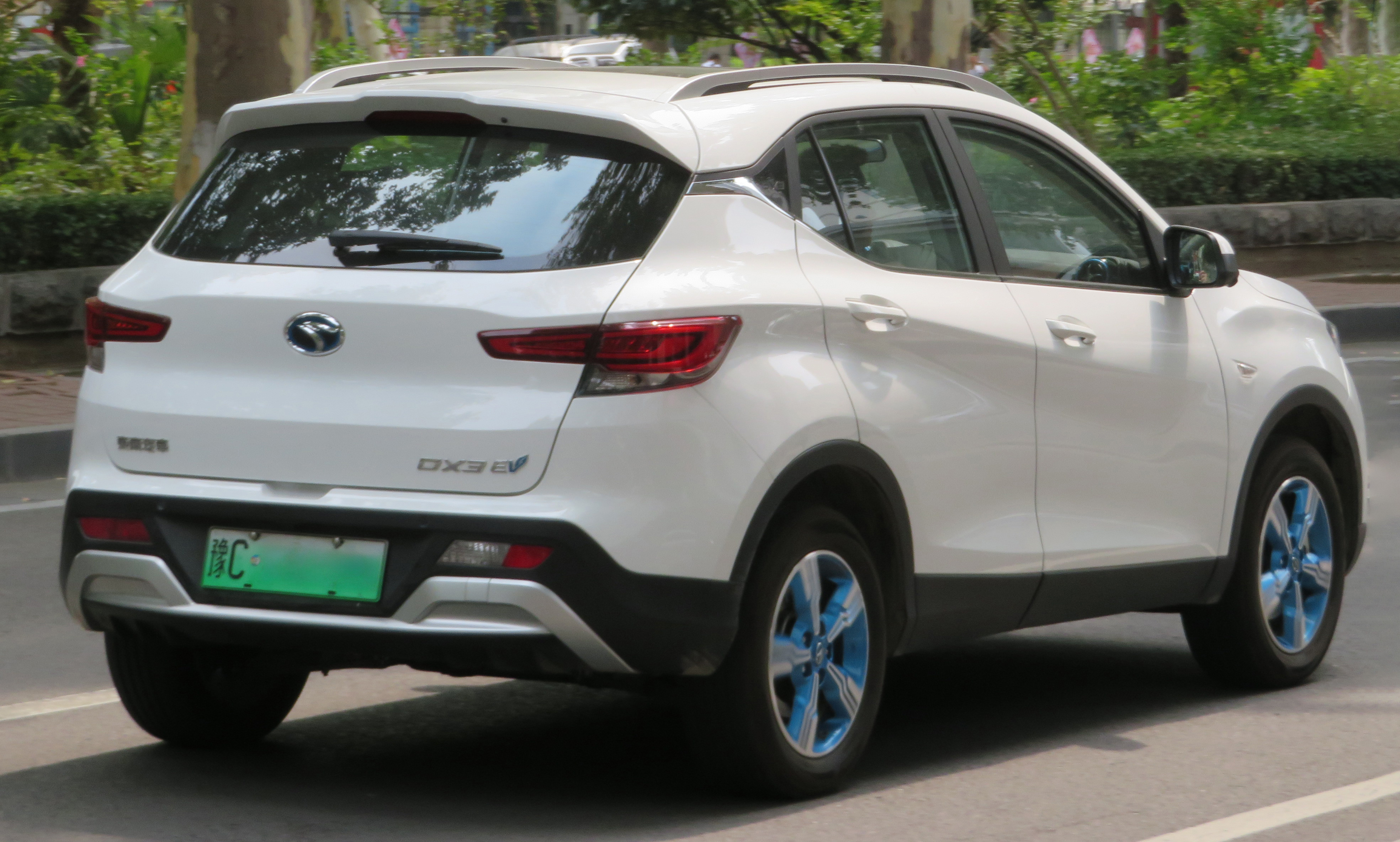
Rear view (EV)

== Soueast DX3X ==
A sportier trim was available in 2018 named the Soueast DX3X, featuring a black mask in the front fascia and minor styling changes.

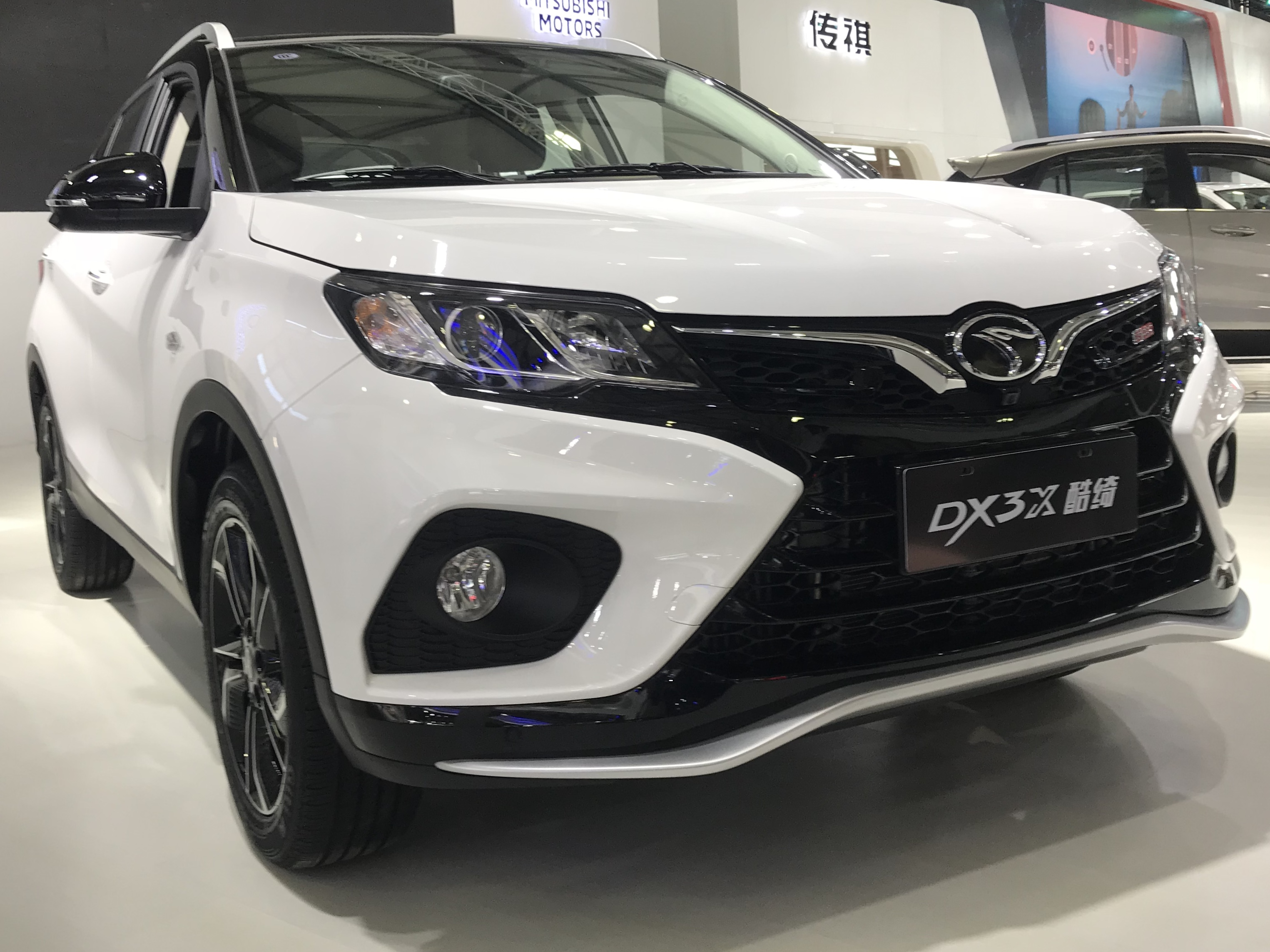
Soueast DX3X

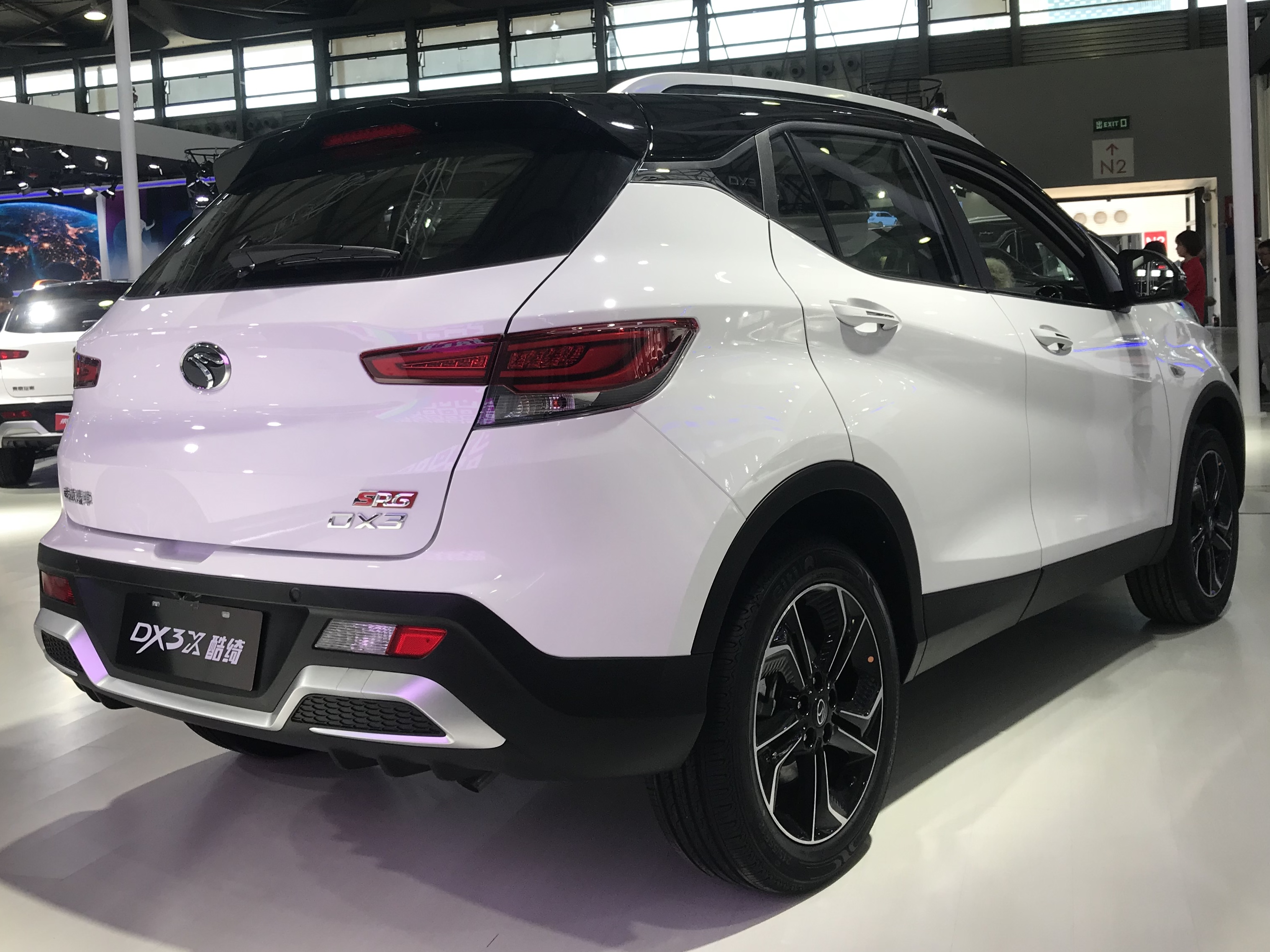
Rear view

== Jetour X70M ==
The Jetour X70M is a facelifted version of the DX3 marketed under the Jetour brand now that the Soueast brand has been retired, and launched on 17 November 2026.

It has a restyled front clip, and the interior features a 10.25-inch digital instrument cluster and 10.25-inch central infotainment display featuring a 360-degree camera system. It has 398 litres (14.1 cu ft) of rear cargo space expanding to 1,262 litres (44.6 cu ft) with the rear seats folded down, and it has a MacPherson strut front suspension and multi-link independent rear suspension.

It is powered exclusively by a Chery 1.5-liter turbocharged port-injected inline-4 petrol engine with a cast-iron block and a compression ratio of 9.5:1, which outputs 145 hp (108 kW; 147 PS) at 5,500 rpm and 230 N⋅m (170 lb⋅ft) at 1,750–4,000 rpm. It is paired with either a 6-speed manual transmission or a 6-speed wet dual-clutch transmission supplied by Getrag.

== Specifications ==
Powertrains
Type	Power		Torque	Transmission
Type	Net	Gross	Torque	Transmission
Soueast DX3
1.5L 4A91 MPFI I4	103 hp (77 kW; 104 PS) at 6,000 rpm	118 hp (88 kW; 120 PS)	143 N⋅m (105 lb⋅ft) at 4,000 rpm	5-speed manual or 8-speed CVT (simulated)
1.5L 4A91T MPFI I4 turbo	134 hp (100 kW; 136 PS) at 5,600 rpm	154 hp (115 kW; 156 PS)	220 N⋅m (162 lb⋅ft) at 2,000–4,000 rpm	5-speed manual or 8-speed CVT (simulated)
Jetour X70M
1.5L SQRE4T15C MPFI I4 turbo	145 hp (108 kW; 147 PS) at 5,500 rpm	154 hp (115 kW; 156 PS)	230 N⋅m (170 lb⋅ft) at 1,750–4,000 rpm	6-speed manual or 6-speed DCT
