= W7 =

W7 may refer to:

- Eutelsat W7, a communications satellite
- JL Audio W7, a popular model of subwoofer
- London Buses route W7, a London bus route
- W7, a postcode district in the W postcode area
- Mark 7 nuclear bomb, a tactical nuclear bomb adopted by US armed forces
- Windows 7, an operating system
- US Form W-7, used to obtain an Individual Taxpayer Identification Number
- W7, an object-capability subset of the Scheme programming language developed by Jonathan Rees
- W7 series, a high-speed shinkansen train type in Japan
- An abbreviation for Warner Bros.-Seven Arts, the name of an entertainment company
- W7, a calmodulin antagonist, an inhibitor of Ca2+/calmodulin-dependent protein kinase; N-(6-aminohexyl)-5-chloro-1-naphthalenesulfonamide hydrochloride
- W-7 Class minesweeper, or the minesweeper itself, W-7
- W7 (tram), a class of electric trams built by the Melbourne & Metropolitan Tramways Board.
- W7-X, a stellarator type fusion reactor

== See also ==
- 7W (disambiguation)
