= Jetour T2 =

Mid-size SUV

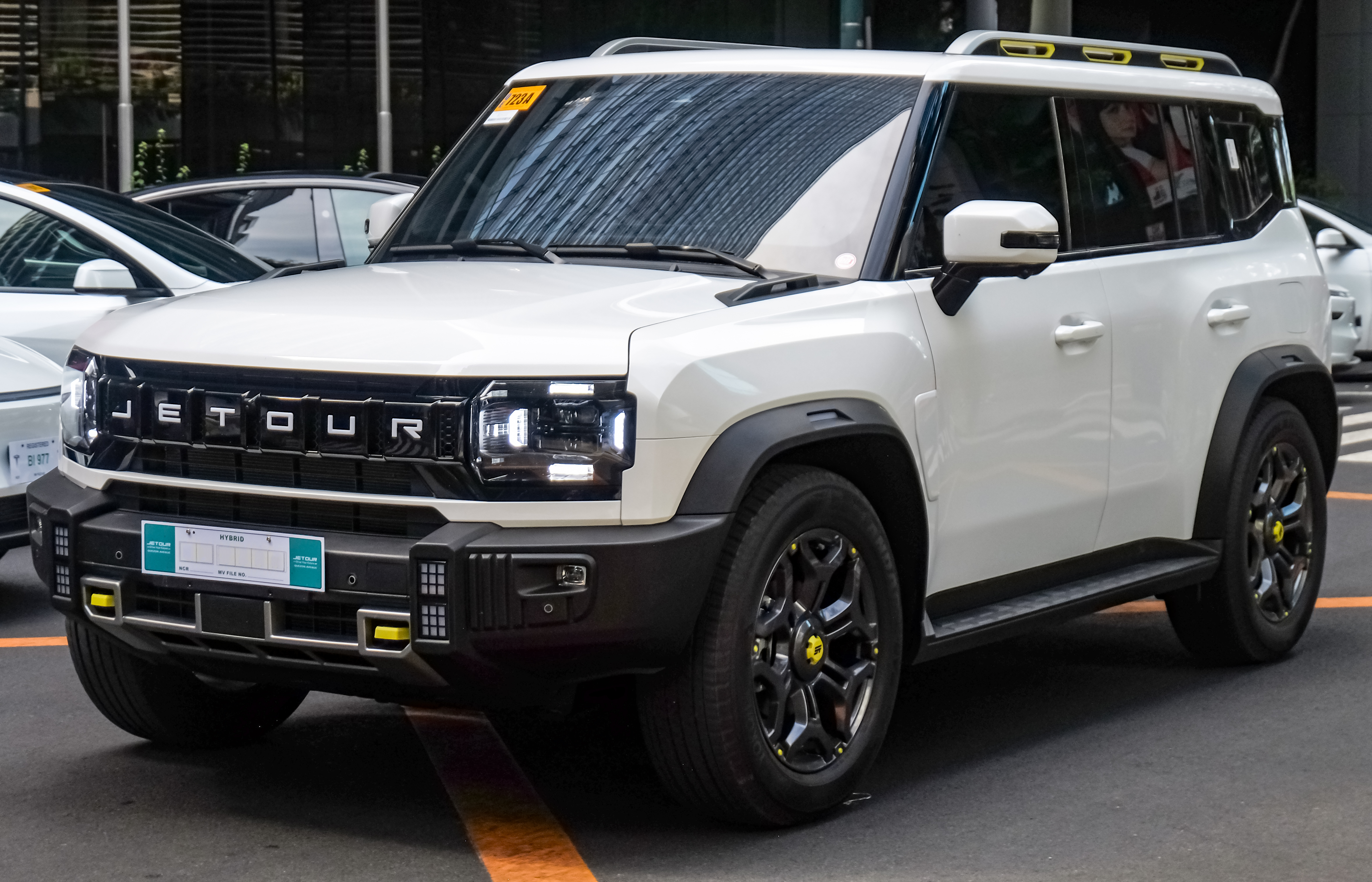

Overview
- Manufacturer: Jetour
- Also called: Jetour Traveller (捷途旅行者; Jiétú Lǚxíngzhě) (China); Jetour Traveller Plus (7-seater, China, 2026–present); Jetour Traveller 7 (China, 2026–present); Jetour Shanhai T2 (plug-in hybrid, China, 2024–2025); ICH-X K3 (Italy); JSW Combat (India); Tissan T2 (Iran)
- Production: September 2023 – present
- Assembly: China: Fuzhou, Fujian; Indonesia: Bekasi, West Java (HIM); Malaysia: Johor Bahru (Berjaya Assembly)
- Designer: Under the lead of Hakan Saracoğlu

Body and chassis
- Class: Mid-size SUV
- Body style: 5-door SUV
- Layout: ICE: Transverse front-engine, front-wheel drive; Transverse front-engine, four-wheel drive (XWD); PHEV: Front-engine, dual-motor, front-wheel drive (T2 i-DM); Front-engine, triple-motor, all-wheel drive (Shanhai T2/T2 i-DM/Traveller C-DM 4WD)
- Platform: Kunlun architecture
- Chassis: Unibody
- Related: Jetour T1

Powertrain
- Engine: Petrol: 1.5 L SQRG4J15 turbo I4; 2.0 L SQRF4J20 turbo I4; Petrol plug-in hybrid: 1.5 L SQRH4J15 turbo I4
- Electric motor: Permanent magnet synchronous
- Transmission: 7-speed dual-clutch; 8-speed automatic; 3-speed DHT (Dedicated Hybrid Transmission)
- Hybrid drivetrain: Series-parallel plug-in hybrid (Shanhai T2/T2 i-DM/Traveller C-DM)
- Battery: 26.61 kWh LFP Deyi/Gotion; 26.7 kWh LFP CALB; 27.2 kWh LFP Gotion; 43.24 kWh LFP CATL; 45.54 kWh LFP CATL; 18.4 kWh LFP CATL
- Electric range: 100–173 km (62–107 mi) (WLTP); 129–251 km (80–156 mi) (CLTC)

Dimensions
- Wheelbase: 2,800 mm (110.2 in)
- Length: 4,782–4,785 mm (188.3–188.4 in); 4,827 mm (190.0 in) (Traveller 7); 5,034 mm (198.2 in) (7-seater/Plus)
- Width: 2,006–2,036 mm (79.0–80.2 in)
- Height: 1,880–1,960 mm (74.0–77.2 in)
- Curb weight: 1,700–1,934 kg (3,748–4,264 lb); 2,050–2,194 kg (4,519–4,837 lb) (Shanhai T2/Traveller C-DM)

The Jetour T2, also known as the Jetour Traveller (Chinese: 捷途旅行者; pinyin: Jiétú Lǚxíngzhě) and Jetour Shanhai T2 (Chinese: 山海T2; lit. 'Mountain sea T2') for the plug-in hybrid in China, is a mid-size SUV manufactured by Jetour since 2023, going on sale in September 2023 in China.

== Overview ==
The T2 was introduced in February 2023 in China as the Jetour Traveller. Pre-sales were opened in August 2023, and the price was announced in China the following month.

The T2 was designed under the guidance of former Porsche designer, Hakan Saracoğlu. It is based on Jetour's Kunlun unibody architecture. Designed with mild off-road capabilities, the T2 has an approach angle of 28 degrees, a departure angle of 30 degrees, a ground clearance of 220 mm (8.7 in), and a claimed wading depth of 700 mm (27.6 in). It is equipped with a BorgWarner torque manager and electronic limited-slip differential, which allows the vehicle switch between different modes according to the conditions. The vehicle uses MacPherson struts for the front suspension and multi-link suspension for the rear.

Available powertrain options include a 1.5-litre turbocharged petrol engine with 7-speed dual clutch transmission with two-wheel drive and four-wheel drive, a four-wheel drive 2.0-litre turbocharged petrol engine with 7-speed dual clutch, and a four-wheel drive 2.0-litre turbocharged petrol engine with 8-speed automatic torque converter.

The T2 is equipped with a 15.6-inch central infotainment screen with a built-in Qualcomm Snapdragon 8155 system on a chip, a 10.25-inch full LCD instrument panel, and a 64-inch panoramic sunroof. It is also available with front soundproof glass, 128-color ambient lights, 10 airbags, and a 12-speaker Sony audio system.

The Silver Dragon Wings (Chinese: 银龙之翼; pinyin: Yín lóng zhī yì) trim level, marketed under the Jetour JMK (Jetour Makers Kingdom) modification sub-brand went on sale in China in January 2024. It is equipped with a raised bonnet, a new grille and front bumper design, roof luggage racks, and all-terrain tires.

Jetour also released an extended-length, three-row version of the T2 in mid-2024.

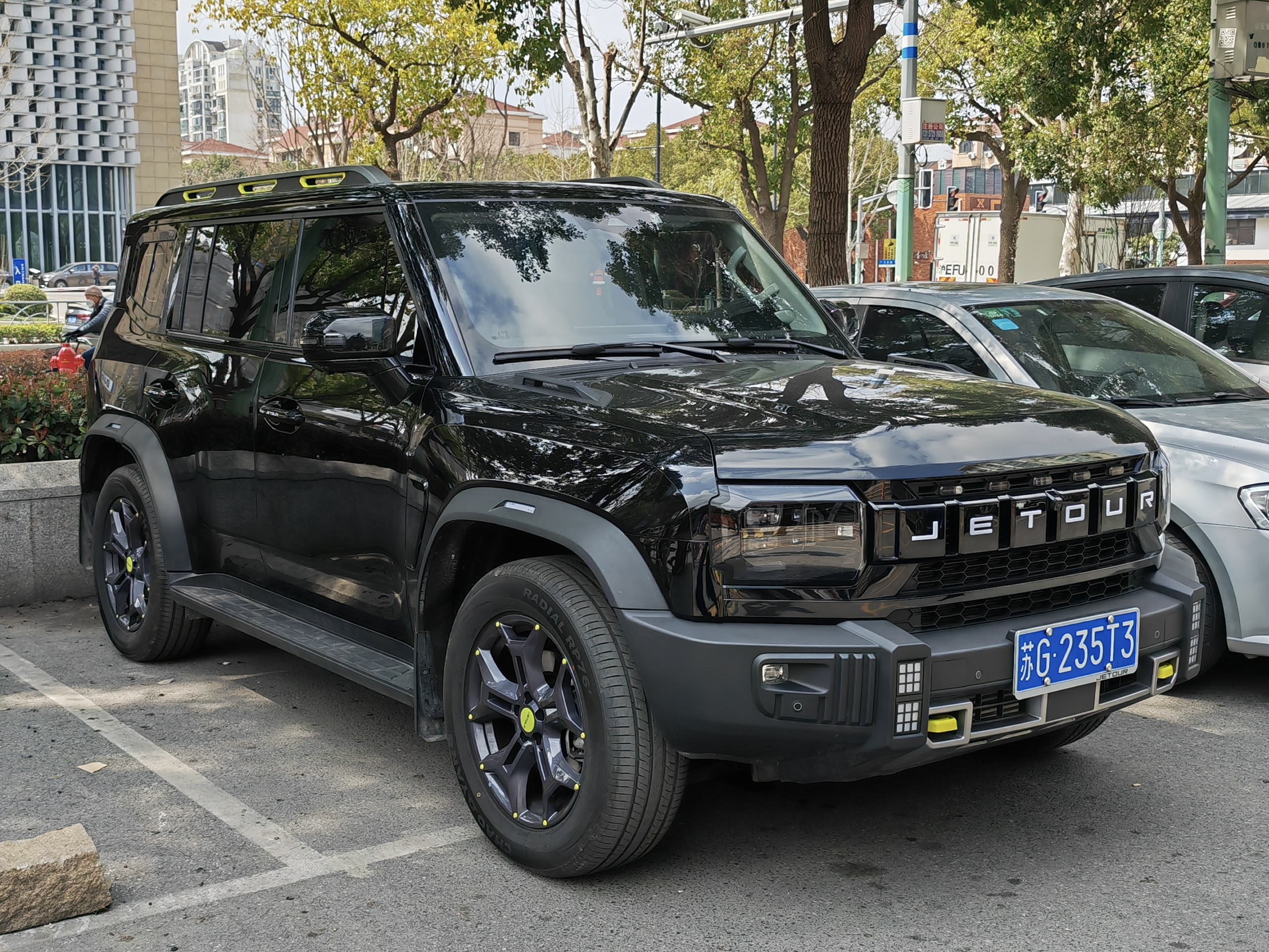
Jetour Traveller

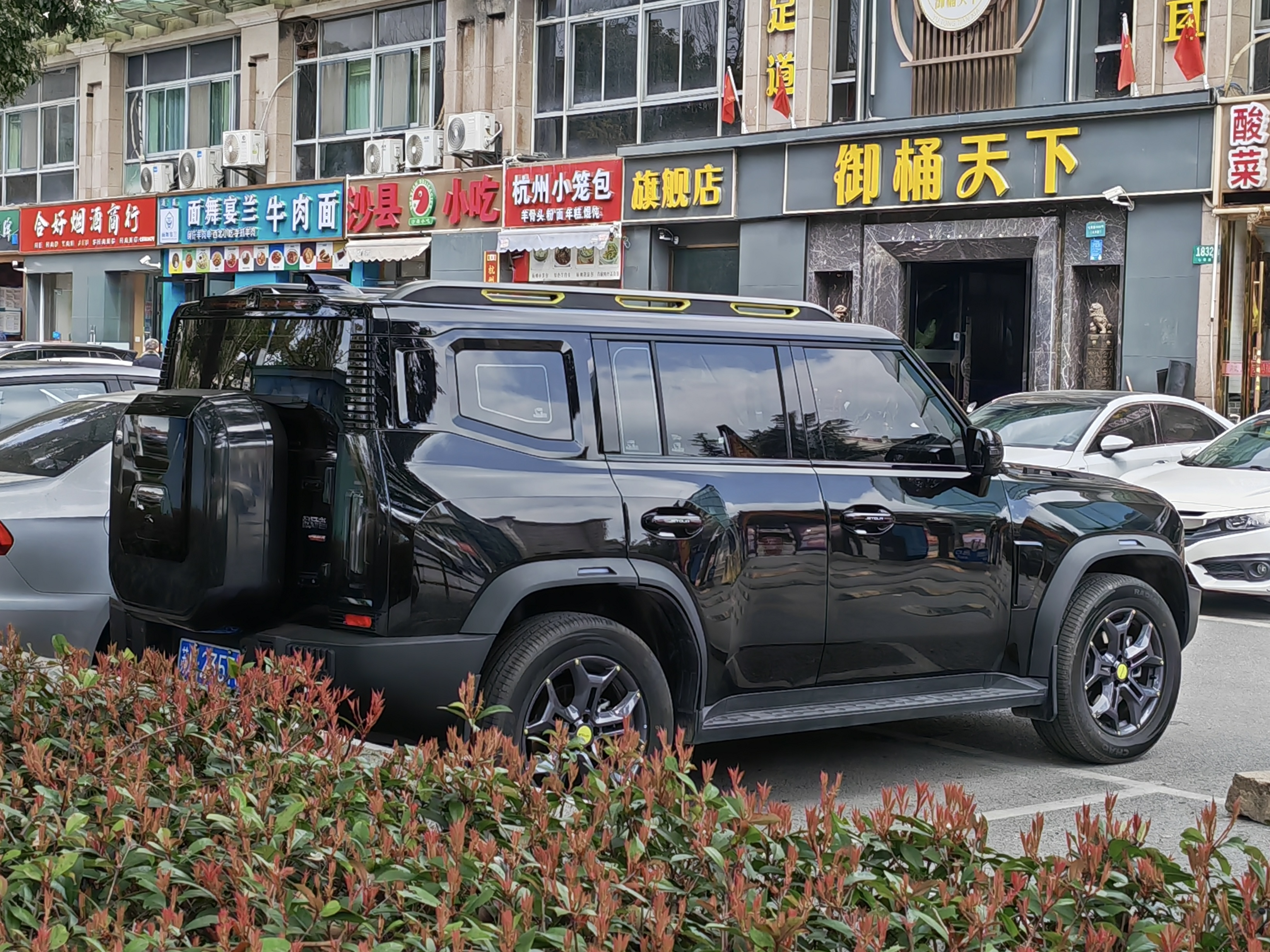
Rear view

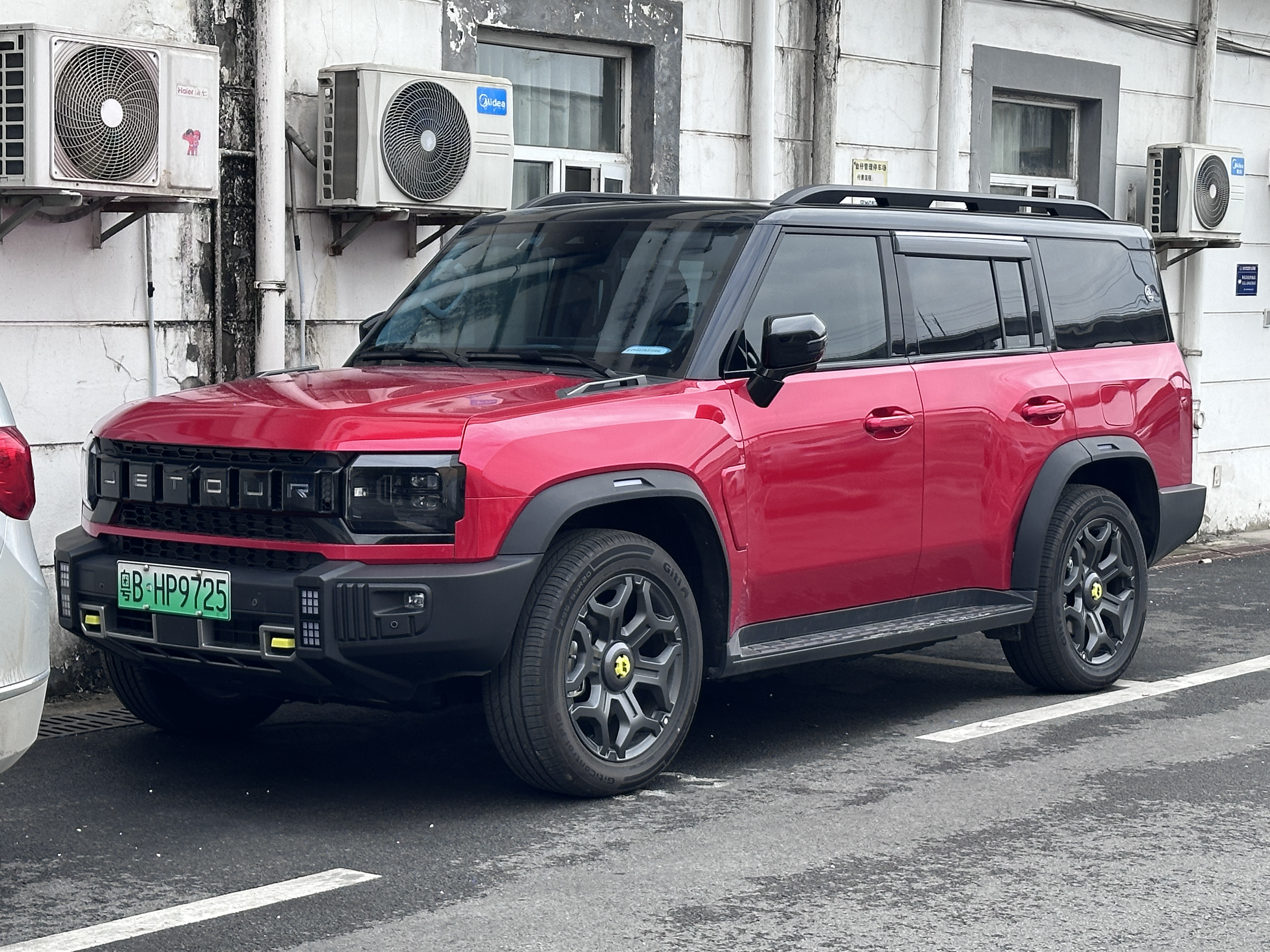
Jetour Traveller (7-seater)

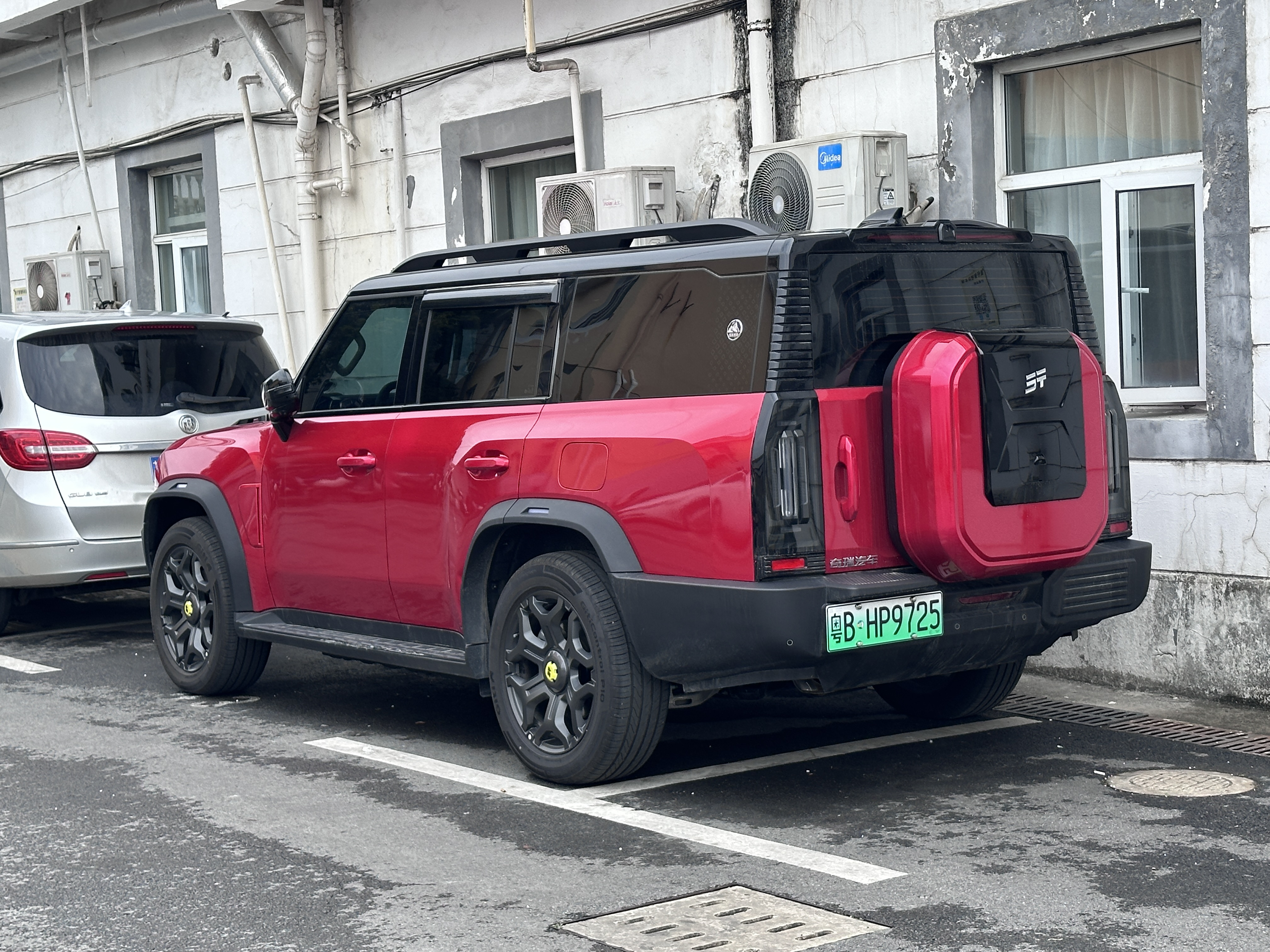
Rear view

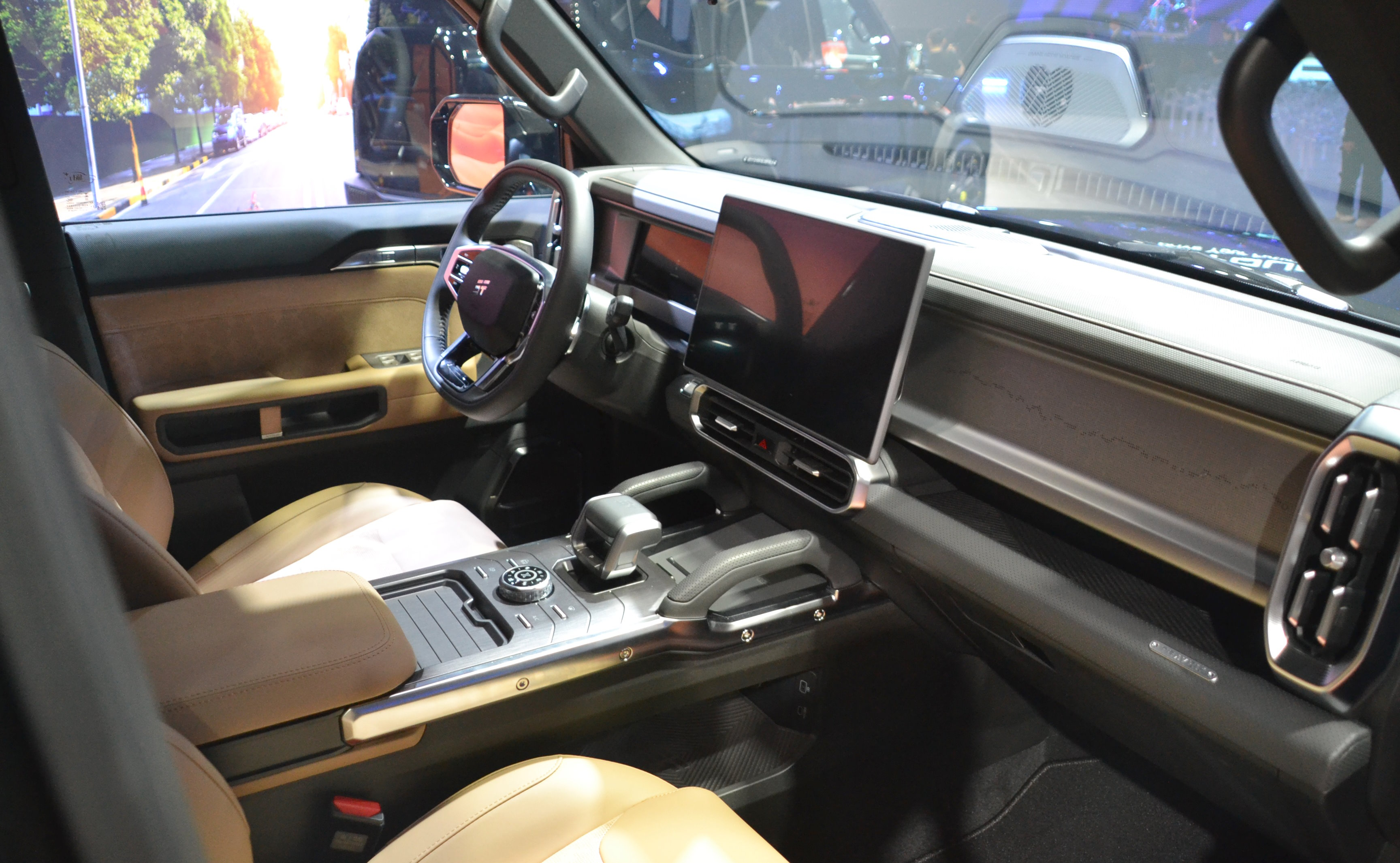
Interior

== Jetour Shanhai T2/Traveller C-DM ==
The Jetour Shanhai T2 is the plug-in hybrid version of the Traveller mid-size SUV, part of the Shanhai sub-brand for Jetour plug-in hybrid vehicles. During pre-production, it was intended to be named the Traveller C-DM. Pre-sale was opened in April 2024 in China. It is equipped by Chery's Kunpeng Super Hybrid C-DM system with a 3-speed dedicated hybrid transmission.

In November 2025, the Jetour Shanhai T2 was renamed to Jetour Traveller C-DM (Chinese: 捷途旅行者C-DM; pinyin: Jiétú Lǚxíngzhě C-DM).

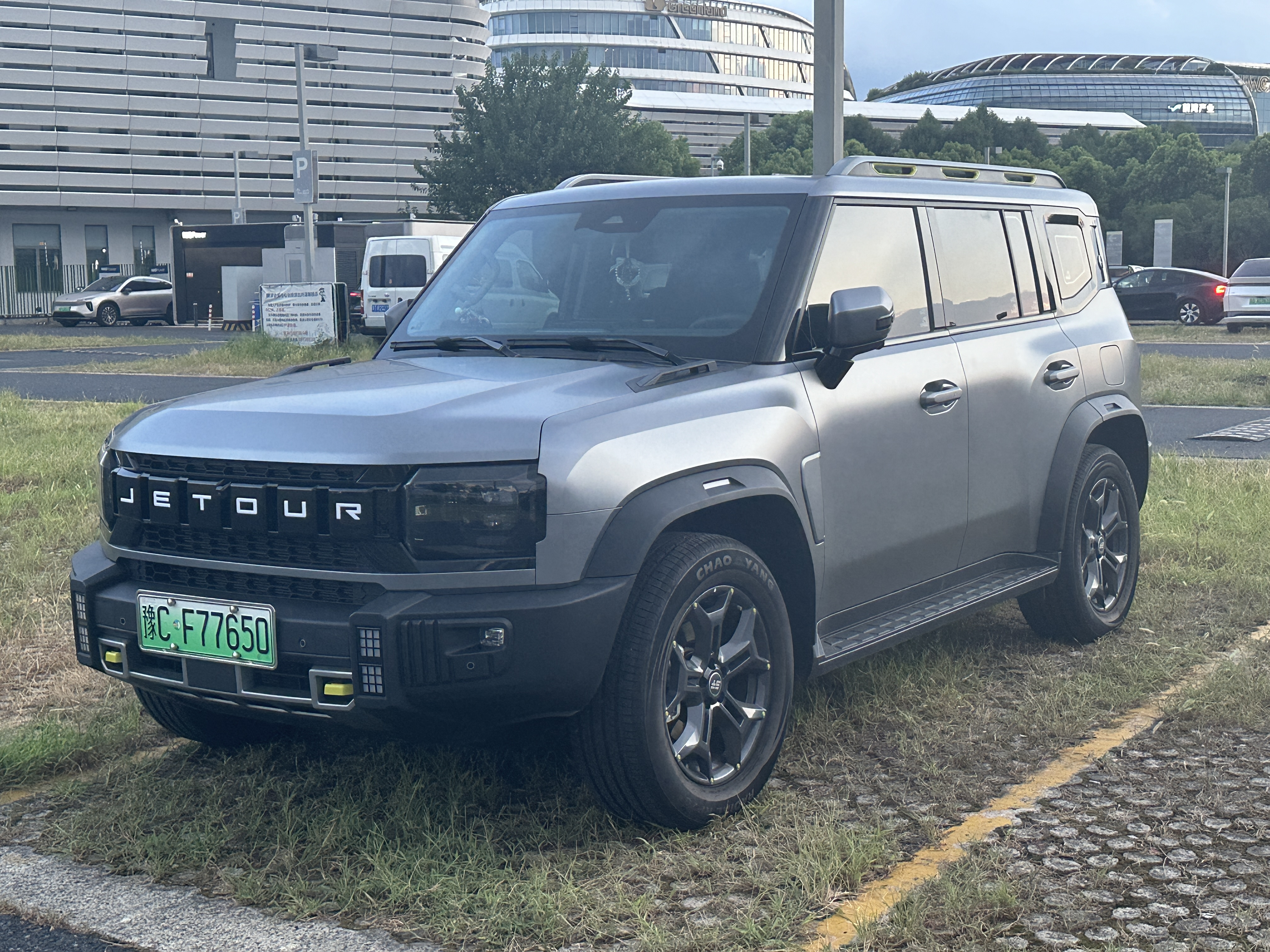
Jetour Shanhai T2

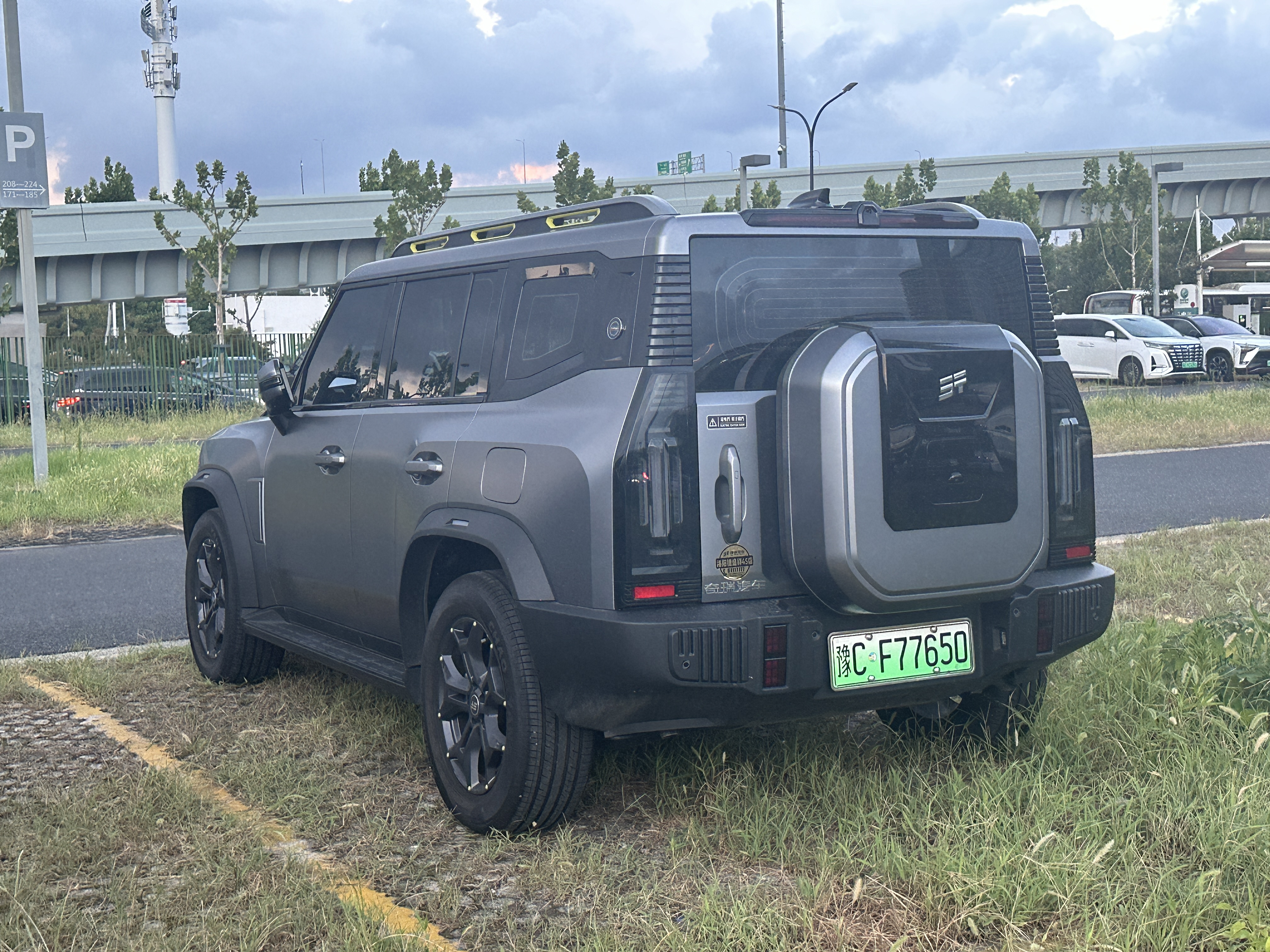
Rear view

== Jetour Traveller 7 ==
The Jetour Traveller 7 is the mid-cycle refresh of the T2. It was unveiled during the Chengdu Auto Show in August 2026 with either petrol or plug-in hybrid powertrains, and was marketed alongside the outgoing Traveller and Traveller C-DM in the domestic market.

The interior features a 10.25-inch digital instrument and a 15.6-inch 2.5K-resolution central infotainment touchscreen and is powered by a Qualcomm Snapdragon 8255 chip.

The Traveller 7 is equipped with Chery's Falcon 500 ADAS system, with a sensor suite consisting of 2 mmWave radars, 5 cameras, and 12 ultrasonic sensors, and is powered by a Horizon Robotics J6M chip capable of 128 TOPS.

Variants featuring Huawei's Qiankun ADS 5 Pro ADAS system were introduced on 16 November 2026. It features a sensor suite consisting of one Limera in-cabin LiDAR sensor, 3 mmWave radars, 11 cameras, and 12 ultrasonic sensors, and the system is capable of Level 2 supervised autonomous driving in highway and urban conditions.

Jetour Traveller 7

Rear view

== Markets ==
Outside of China, the vehicle is mostly known as the Jetour T2.

=== Argentina ===
The T2 was launched in Argentina on 16 October 2025, in the sole unnamed variant powered by the 2.0-litre turbocharged petrol engine equipped with all-wheel drive.

In May 2026, the i-DM model using the 1.5-litre petrol plug-in hybrid equipped with front-wheel drive was introduced in Argentina.

=== Brazil ===
The T2 was launched in Brazil on 28 January 2026, with two trim levels: Advance and Premium, it is powered by the 1.5-litre petrol plug-in hybrid equipped with front-wheel drive.

In July 2026, the i-DM XWD model using the 1.5-litre petrol plug-in hybrid equipped with all-wheel drive was introduced in Brazil.

=== India ===
The Jetour T2 will be sold in India as the JSW Combat, with its unveiling scheduled for 4 December 2026.

=== Indonesia ===
The T2 was introduced in Indonesia in July 2025 at the 32nd Gaikindo Indonesia International Auto Show, and later launched on 21 November 2025 at the 2025 Gaikindo Jakarta Auto Week. It is available in the sole variant powered by the 2.0-litre turbocharged petrol engine. In July 2026, the i-DM model using the 1.5-litre petrol plug-in hybrid was introduced in Indonesia.

=== Iran ===
The T2 is sold in Iran as the Tissan T2, which was unveiled on 12 September 2026 alongside the Tissan T1 and Tissan G700.

Tissan T2 (Iran)

=== Italy ===
Debuting at the Turin Motor Show 2024, the Jetour Traveller was sold as the ICH-X K3 in Italy.

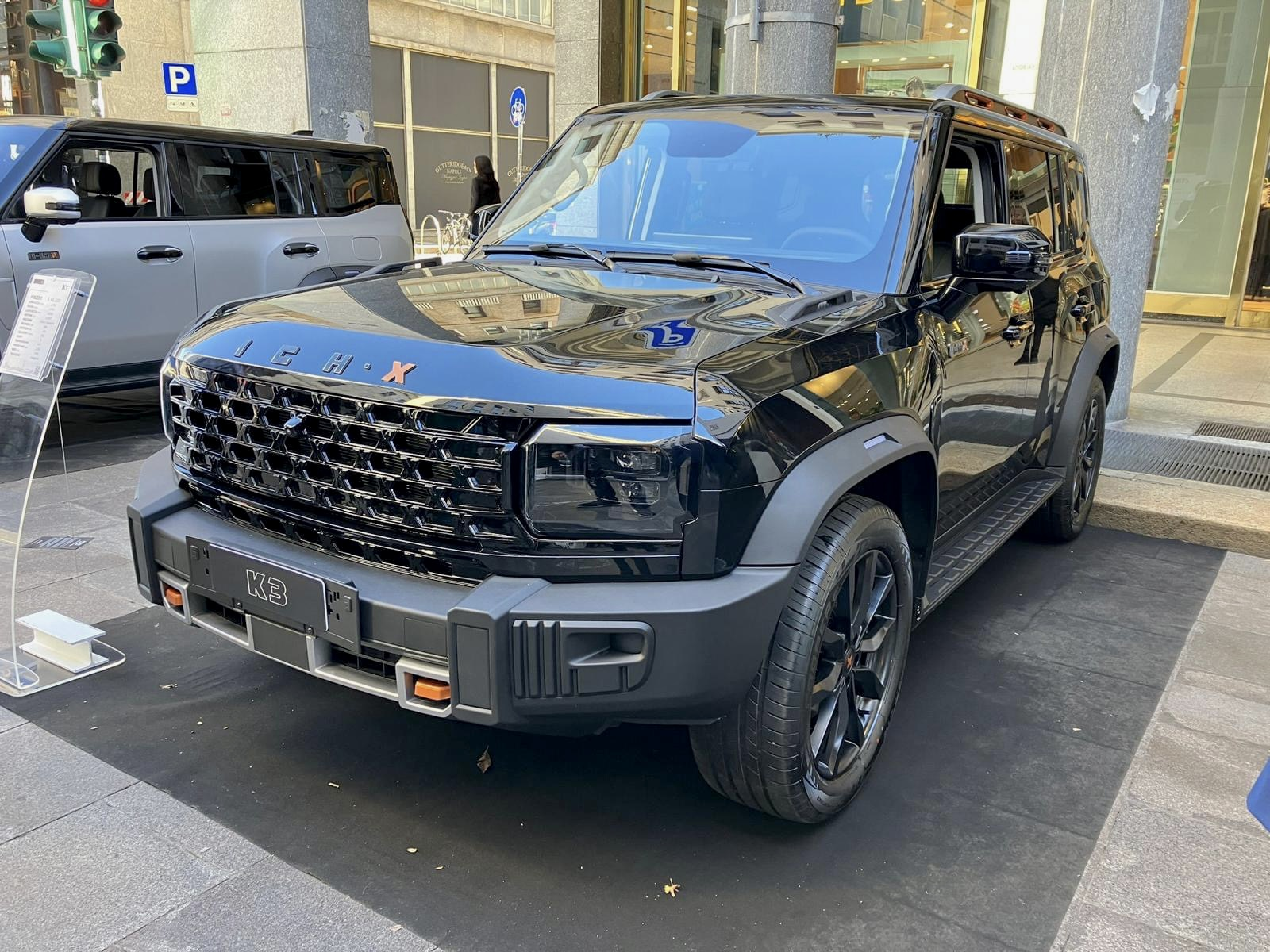
ICH-X K3 (Italy)

=== Malaysia ===
The T2 was introduced in Malaysia in May 2025, and later launched on 13 March 2026. Locally assembled in Johor Bahru (Berjaya Assembly), it is available in the sole 2.0TD XWD variant powered by the 2.0-litre turbocharged petrol engine. In August 2026, the Dark Warrior Limited Edition was made available limited to 69 units, to celebrate the 69th year in Malaysia's Independence. In September 2026, the i-DM model using the 1.5-litre petrol plug-in hybrid was introduced in Malaysia.

=== Mexico ===
The T2 was launched in Mexico on 29 August 2024, in the sole unnamed variant powered by the 2.0-litre turbocharged petrol engine.

In September 2026, the i-DM XWD model using the 1.5-litre petrol plug-in hybrid equipped with all-wheel drive was introduced in Mexico.

=== Philippines ===
The T2 was introduced in the Philippines on 4 April 2024, alongside the Jetour Dashing PHEV. It is available with two trim levels: Beyond and Terrain; both powered by the 2.0-litre turbocharged petrol engine and paired with a 7-speed dual-clutch transmission.

The Terminator variant was added in October 2024, available in two trim levels: Executive and Outdoor.

The Lightning i-DM plug-in hybrid and Panda Edition variants were added in April 2025, both are available with the 1.5-litre turbocharged plug-in hybrid engine paired with a 3-speed dedicated hybrid transmission, while the Panda Edition is also available with the 2.0-litre turbocharged petrol engine. In September 2026, the four-wheel drive (4x4) option became available for the Lightning i-DM plug-in hybrid model.

=== Saudi Arabia ===
The T2 was launched on 31 December 2023, it is powered by the 2.0-litre turbocharged petrol engine and paired with 7-speed dual-clutch transmission.

=== South Africa ===
The T2 was launched in South Africa on 27 October 2025, alongside the Jetour T1. It is available with three trim levels: Aspire, Xplora and Odyssey. For powertrains, it is available with either 1.5-litre and 2.0-litre turbocharged petrols, with all wheel drive standard on the latter engine.

In April 2026, the i-DM model using the 1.5-litre petrol plug-in hybrid was introduced in South Africa as the flagship variant. At the time of the i-DM model introduction, the T2 i-DM was the most expensive variant in the Jetour line-up in South Africa.

The T2 won the 2026 South African Car of the Year – the first vehicle from a Chinese manufacturer to do so. In September 2026, the T2 was among the 20 best-selling passenger vehicles in SA.

=== Sri Lanka ===
The Jetour T2 was officially launched in Sri Lanka in September 2025 through Euro Motors distributor. It is available in three distinct variants: a 1.5-litre turbocharged petrol version, a 1.5-litre turbocharged i-DM (intelligent Dual Motor) plug-in hybrid, and a 2.0-litre turbocharged petrol version equipped with an intelligent XWD (four-wheel drive) system and a 7-speed dual-clutch transmission.

=== UAE ===
The T2 was officially launched on 27 January 2024 through Elite Group Holding. It is powered by the 2.0-litre turbocharged engine and paired with 8-speed automatic transmission.

The hybrid variant called the T2 i-DM was launched on 28 December 2024.

== Powertrain ==
The 2.0-liter turbocharged iniline-4 petrol engine outputs 241 hp (180 kW; 244 PS) (251 hp (187 kW; 254 PS) gross) at 5,500 rpm and 390 N⋅m (288 lb⋅ft; 39.8 kg⋅m) of torque at 1,750–4,000 rpm. It is paired with either a 7-speed wet dual-clutch transmission or an 8-speed automatic transmission which Chery claims achieves a peak transmission efficiency of 96.6% and delivers up to 7,700 N⋅m (5,680 lb⋅ft; 785 kg⋅m) of wheel torque.

The Traveller 7 C-DM uses a 1.5-liter turbocharged inline-4 in Miller cycle with a compression ratio of 14.5:1, achieving a peak thermal efficiency of 45.79%. It outputs 141 hp (105 kW; 143 PS) (154 hp (115 kW; 156 PS) gross) at 5,200 rpm and 220 N⋅m (162 lb⋅ft; 22.4 kg⋅m) of torque at 2,500 rpm. It is paired with a 1-speed series-parallel hybrid transmission with an integrated 165 kW (224 PS; 221 hp) motor with a top speed of 24,000rpm and a 12-in-1 drive unit results in 92% peak drive efficiency.

Specifications (Petrol)
Model	Years	Transmission	Net power	Gross power	Torque	Top speed
1.5 L SQRG4J15 turbo I4	2023–present	7-speed DCT	125 kW (170 PS; 168 hp) at 5,500 rpm	135 kW (184 PS; 181 hp)	290 N⋅m (214 lb⋅ft; 29.6 kg⋅m) at 2,000–4,000 rpm	180 km/h (112 mph)
2.0 L SQRG4J20 turbo I4	2023–present	7-speed DCT or 8-speed automatic	180 kW (245 PS; 241 hp) at 5,500 rpm	187 kW (254 PS; 251 hp)	390 N⋅m (288 lb⋅ft; 39.8 kg⋅m) at 1,750–4,000 rpm	180 km/h (112 mph)

Specification (PHEV)
Model	Model year	Engine			Transmission	Motor		System total		Battery		Electric range		30–80% charge	Top speed
Model	Model year	Type	Power	Torque	Transmission	Power	Torque	Power	Torque	Type	Weight	WLTP	CLTC	30–80% charge	Top speed
Shanhai T2/Traveller C-DM
FWD	2024–present	1.5 L SQRH4J15 turbo I4	105 kW (143 PS; 141 hp) at 5,200 rpm	220 N⋅m (162 lb⋅ft; 22.4 kg⋅m) at 2,500 rpm	3-speed DHT	165 kW (224 PS; 221 hp)	390 N⋅m (288 lb⋅ft; 39.8 kg⋅m)	270 kW (367 PS; 362 hp)	610 N⋅m (450 lb⋅ft; 62.2 kg⋅m)	26.7 kWh LFP CALB	242 kg (534 lb)	100 km (62 mi)	129 km (80 mi)	30 min	197 km/h (122 mph)
FWD	2024–present	1.5 L SQRH4J15 turbo I4	105 kW (143 PS; 141 hp) at 5,200 rpm	220 N⋅m (162 lb⋅ft; 22.4 kg⋅m) at 2,500 rpm	3-speed DHT	165 kW (224 PS; 221 hp)	390 N⋅m (288 lb⋅ft; 39.8 kg⋅m)	270 kW (367 PS; 362 hp)	610 N⋅m (450 lb⋅ft; 62.2 kg⋅m)	27.2 kWh LFP Gotion	253 kg (558 lb)	100 km (62 mi)	129 km (80 mi)	30 min	197 km/h (122 mph)
FWD	2024–25	1.5 L SQRH4J15 turbo I4	105 kW (143 PS; 141 hp) at 5,200 rpm	220 N⋅m (162 lb⋅ft; 22.4 kg⋅m) at 2,500 rpm	3-speed DHT	165 kW (224 PS; 221 hp)	390 N⋅m (288 lb⋅ft; 39.8 kg⋅m)	270 kW (367 PS; 362 hp)	610 N⋅m (450 lb⋅ft; 62.2 kg⋅m)	43.244 kWh LFP CATL	315 kg (694 lb)	161 km (100 mi)	208 km (129 mi)	36 min	210 km/h (130 mph)
FWD	2026–present	1.5 L SQRH4J15 turbo I4	105 kW (143 PS; 141 hp) at 5,200 rpm	220 N⋅m (162 lb⋅ft; 22.4 kg⋅m) at 2,500 rpm	3-speed DHT	165 kW (224 PS; 221 hp)	390 N⋅m (288 lb⋅ft; 39.8 kg⋅m)	270 kW (367 PS; 362 hp)	610 N⋅m (450 lb⋅ft; 62.2 kg⋅m)	43.244 kWh LFP CATL	315 kg (694 lb)	162 km (101 mi)	212 km (132 mi)	36 min	200 km/h (124 mph)
4WD	2024–25	1.5 L SQRH4J15 turbo I4	105 kW (143 PS; 141 hp) at 5,200 rpm	220 N⋅m (162 lb⋅ft; 22.4 kg⋅m) at 2,500 rpm	3-speed DHT	330 kW (449 PS; 443 hp)	700 N⋅m (516 lb⋅ft; 71.4 kg⋅m)	455 kW (619 PS; 610 hp)	920 N⋅m (679 lb⋅ft; 93.8 kg⋅m)	43.244 kWh LFP CATL	315 kg (694 lb)	160 km (99 mi)	206 km (128 mi)	36 min	200 km/h (124 mph)
4WD	2026–present	1.5 L SQRH4J15 turbo I4	105 kW (143 PS; 141 hp) at 5,200 rpm	220 N⋅m (162 lb⋅ft; 22.4 kg⋅m) at 2,500 rpm	3-speed DHT	330 kW (449 PS; 443 hp)	700 N⋅m (516 lb⋅ft; 71.4 kg⋅m)	455 kW (619 PS; 610 hp)	920 N⋅m (679 lb⋅ft; 93.8 kg⋅m)	43.244 kWh LFP CATL	315 kg (694 lb)	160 km (99 mi)	211 km (131 mi)	36 min	200 km/h (124 mph)
Traveller 7 C-DM
FWD	2027–present	1.5 L SQRH4J15 turbo I4	105 kW (143 PS; 141 hp) at 5,200 rpm	220 N⋅m (162 lb⋅ft; 22.4 kg⋅m) at 2,500 rpm	1-speed DHT	260 kW (354 PS; 349 hp)	330 N⋅m (243 lb⋅ft; 33.7 kg⋅m)	375 kW (510 PS; 503 hp)	550 N⋅m (406 lb⋅ft; 56.1 kg⋅m)	26.61 kWh LFP Gotion/Deyi	252 kg (556 lb)	108 km (67 mi)	140 km (87 mi)		180 km/h (112 mph)
FWD	2027–present	1.5 L SQRH4J15 turbo I4	105 kW (143 PS; 141 hp) at 5,200 rpm	220 N⋅m (162 lb⋅ft; 22.4 kg⋅m) at 2,500 rpm	1-speed DHT	260 kW (354 PS; 349 hp)	330 N⋅m (243 lb⋅ft; 33.7 kg⋅m)	375 kW (510 PS; 503 hp)	550 N⋅m (406 lb⋅ft; 56.1 kg⋅m)	45.12 kWh LFP CATL	342 kg (754 lb)	173 km (107 mi)	251 km (156 mi)		200 km/h (124 mph)
4WD	2027–present	1.5 L SQRH4J15 turbo I4	105 kW (143 PS; 141 hp) at 5,200 rpm	220 N⋅m (162 lb⋅ft; 22.4 kg⋅m) at 2,500 rpm	1-speed DHT	460 kW (625 PS; 617 hp)	615 N⋅m (454 lb⋅ft; 62.7 kg⋅m)			45.12 kWh LFP CATL	342 kg (754 lb)	165 km (103 mi)	220 km (137 mi)		200 km/h (124 mph)

== Safety ==
ASEAN NCAP test results Jetour T2 (2025)
Test	Points
Overall:	5 /5 stars
Adult occupant:	37.17
Child occupant:	15.94
Safety assist:	17.14
Motorcyclist Safety:	16.25

== Sales ==
Year	China		Middle East				Mexico	
Year	Traveller	C-DM	UAE	Qatar	Oman	Bahrain	T2	T2 i-DM
2023	25,597	—	—				—	—
2024	103,450	—	5,373	3,976			313	—
2025	63,425	28,550	11,180	7,351	2,648	1,781	557	626
