= Jetour Dashing =

Compact crossover SUV

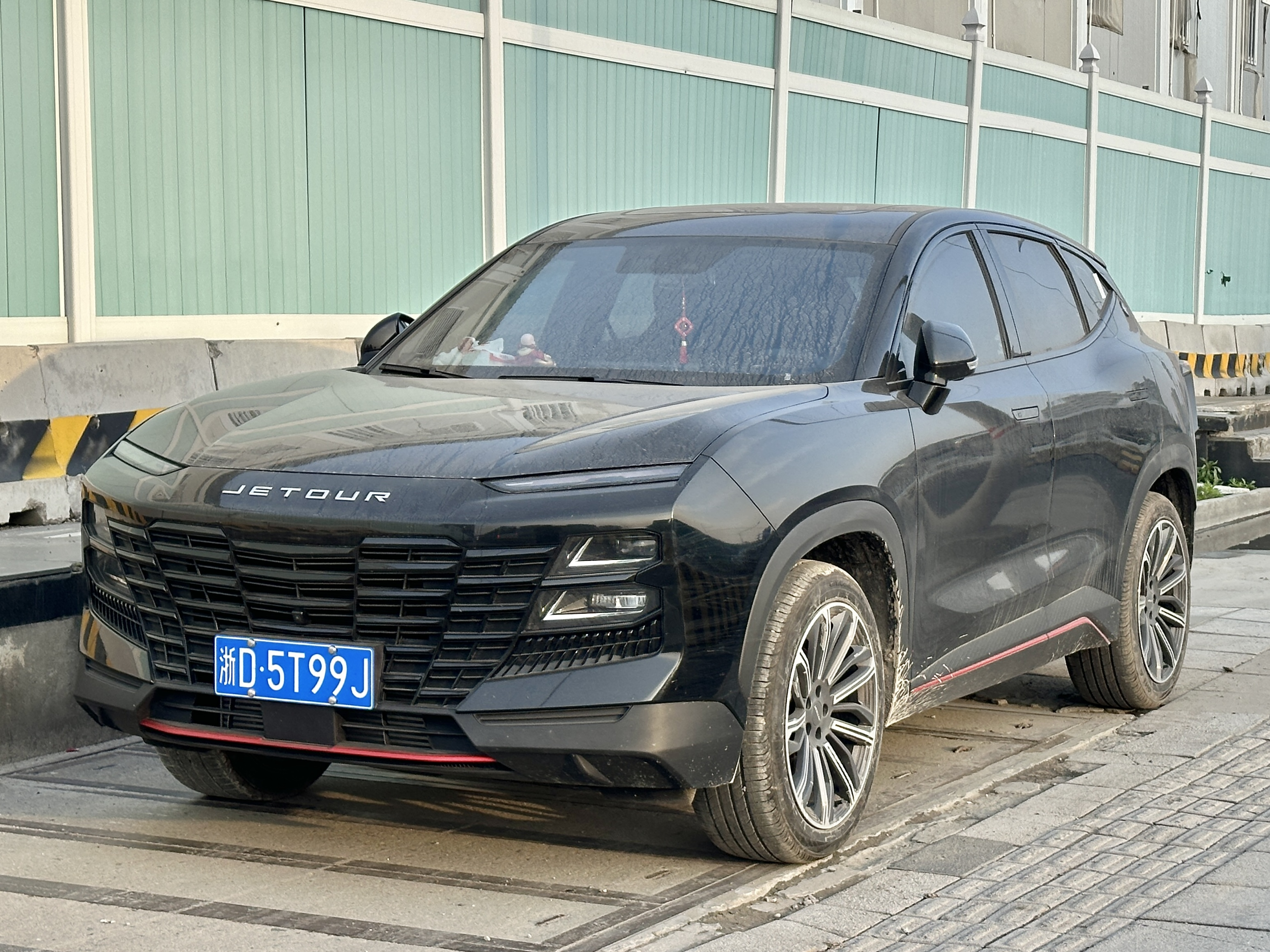

Overview
- Manufacturer: Jetour
- Also called: Jetour Shanhai L6 (PHEV); Soueast S06; Sportequipe 6 GT (Italy); Bahman Fidelity XB1 (Iran); Votour V5 (Russia)
- Production: 2022–present
- Assembly: China: Kaifeng, Henan; Wuhu, Anhui; Indonesia: Bekasi, West Java (HIM); Malaysia: Johor Bahru (Berjaya Assembly); Russia: Kaliningrad (Avtotor)

Body and chassis
- Class: Compact crossover SUV (C)
- Body style: 5-door SUV
- Layout: Front-engine, front-wheel-drive
- Platform: Kunlun architecture

Powertrain
- Engine: Petrol: 1.5 L I4 turbo; 1.6 L I4 turbo; Petrol plug-in hybrid: 1.5 L I4 turbo + electric motor (PHEV)
- Electric motor: 1x AC PMSM (PHEV)
- Power output: 115 kW (156 PS; 154 hp) (1.5 turbo); 145 kW (197 PS; 194 hp) (1.6 turbo); 125 kW (170 PS; 168 hp) (electric motor, PHEV); 240 kW (326 PS; 322 hp) (combined, PHEV)
- Transmission: 6-speed manual; 6-speed DCT; 7-speed DCT; 3-speed DHT (PHEV)
- Battery: 19.27 kWh li-ion battery (PHEV)
- Electric range: 80 km (50 mi) (WLTP); 100 km (62 mi) (NEDC)

Dimensions
- Wheelbase: 2,720 mm (107.1 in)
- Length: 4,590 mm (180.7 in)
- Width: 1,900 mm (74.8 in)
- Height: 1,685 mm (66.3 in)
- Curb weight: 1,530–1,580 kg (3,373–3,483 lb); 1,800–1,810 kg (3,968–3,990 lb) (PHEV)

The Jetour Dashing (Chinese: 捷途大圣; pinyin: Jiétú Dàshèng; lit. 'monkey king') is a compact crossover SUV produced by Jetour since 2022.

== Overview ==
The interior of the Dashing features a central 15.6-inch control screen and is equipped with a third-generation Snapdragon high-performance chip. The infotainment system supports AutoNavi, Tencent, and Baidu Maps. The Dashing interior includes an 8-inch LCD screen, a head-up display (HUD), a flat-bottom steering wheel design, a voice recognition system, a wireless charging pad on the center console, and Level 2+ driving assistance functions with cruise control and lane change capabilities. The Dashing also features a negative ion fresh air system that has passed the CN95 high-efficiency filter test, ensuring a PM2.5 level inside the vehicle.

Rear view

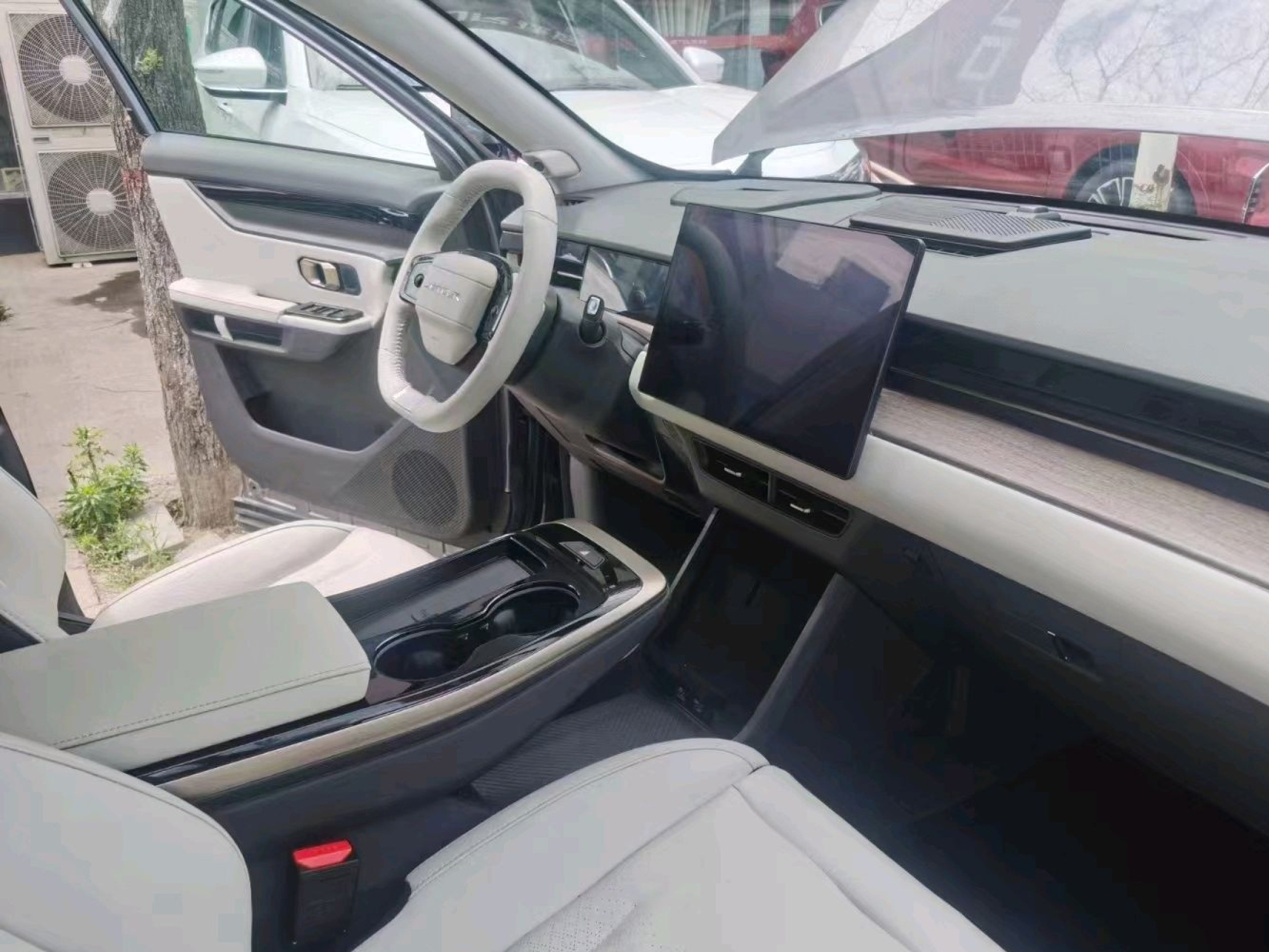
Interior

=== 2024 (facelift) ===
The Dashing 2024 facelift was first teased as the Jetour X-2 prototype during the 2023 Shanghai Auto Show.

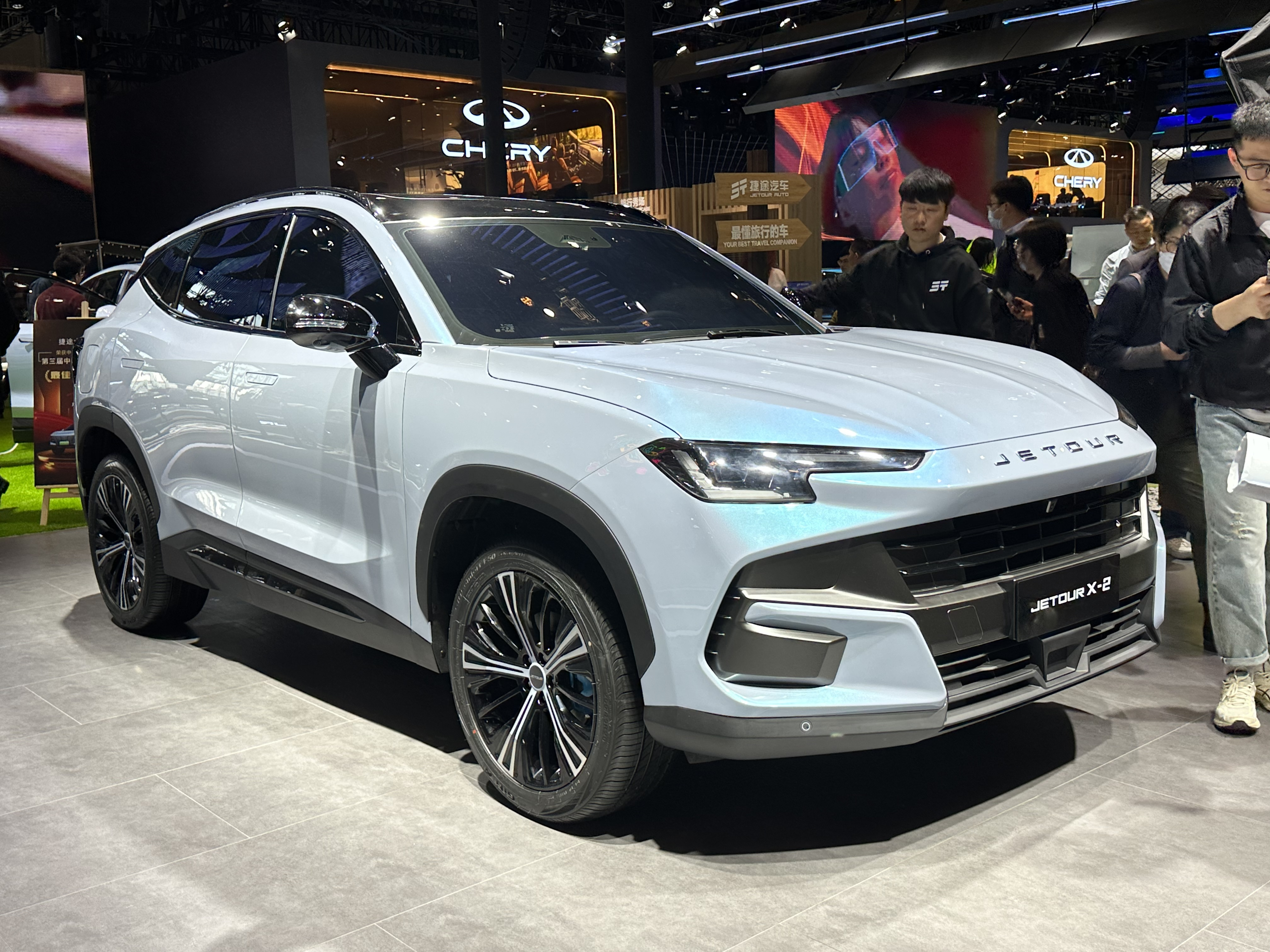
Jetour X-2

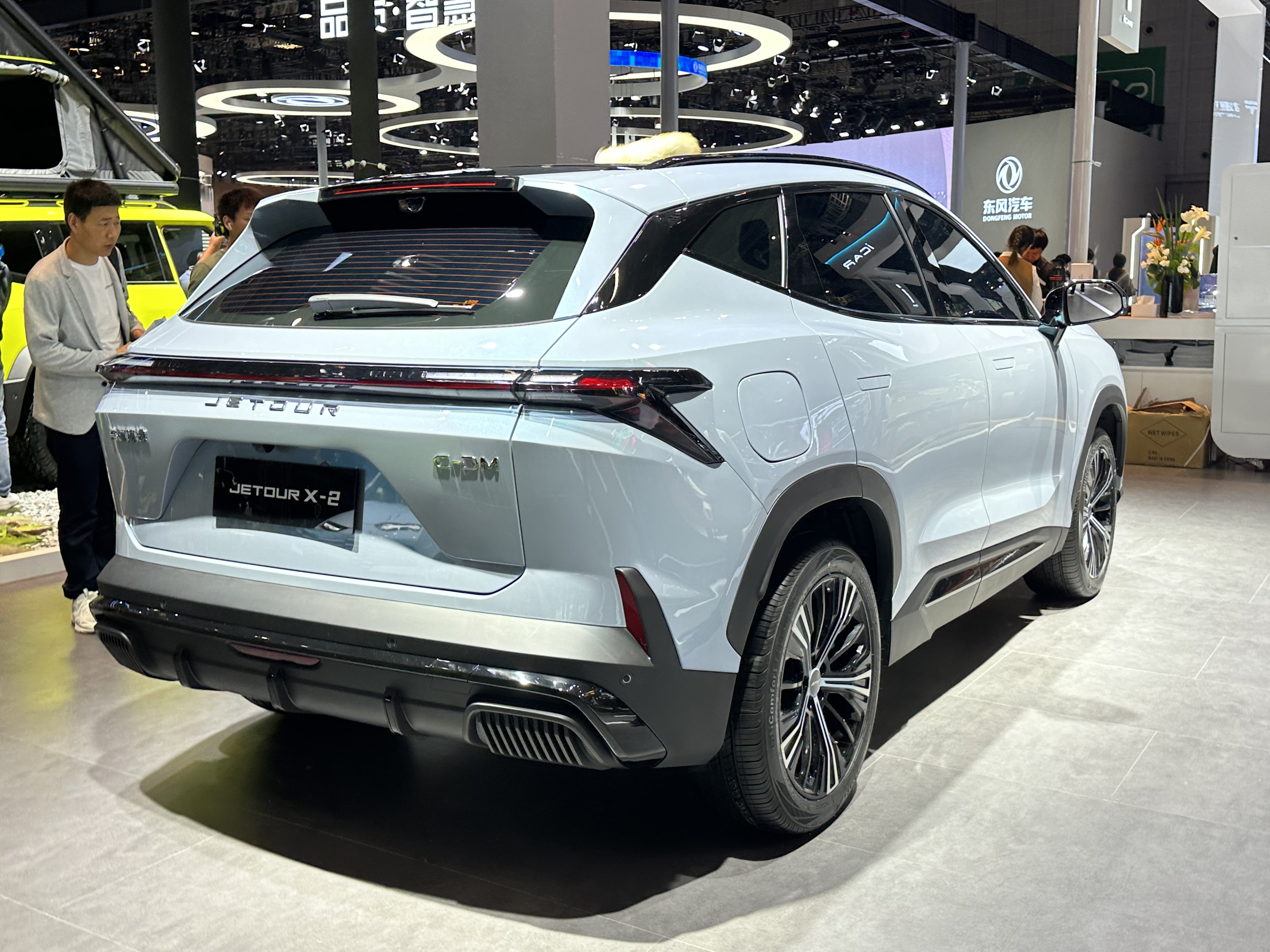
Rear view

Jetour Dashing 2024 (facelift)

Rear view

== Jetour Shanhai L6 ==
The Jetour Shanhai L6 (山海L6, literally: Mountain sea L6) is the plug-in hybrid version of the Dashing crossover SUV. The Shanhai L6 is powered by Chery's C-DM hybrid system expected to be equipped with a 1.5-litre turbo engine and electric motors.

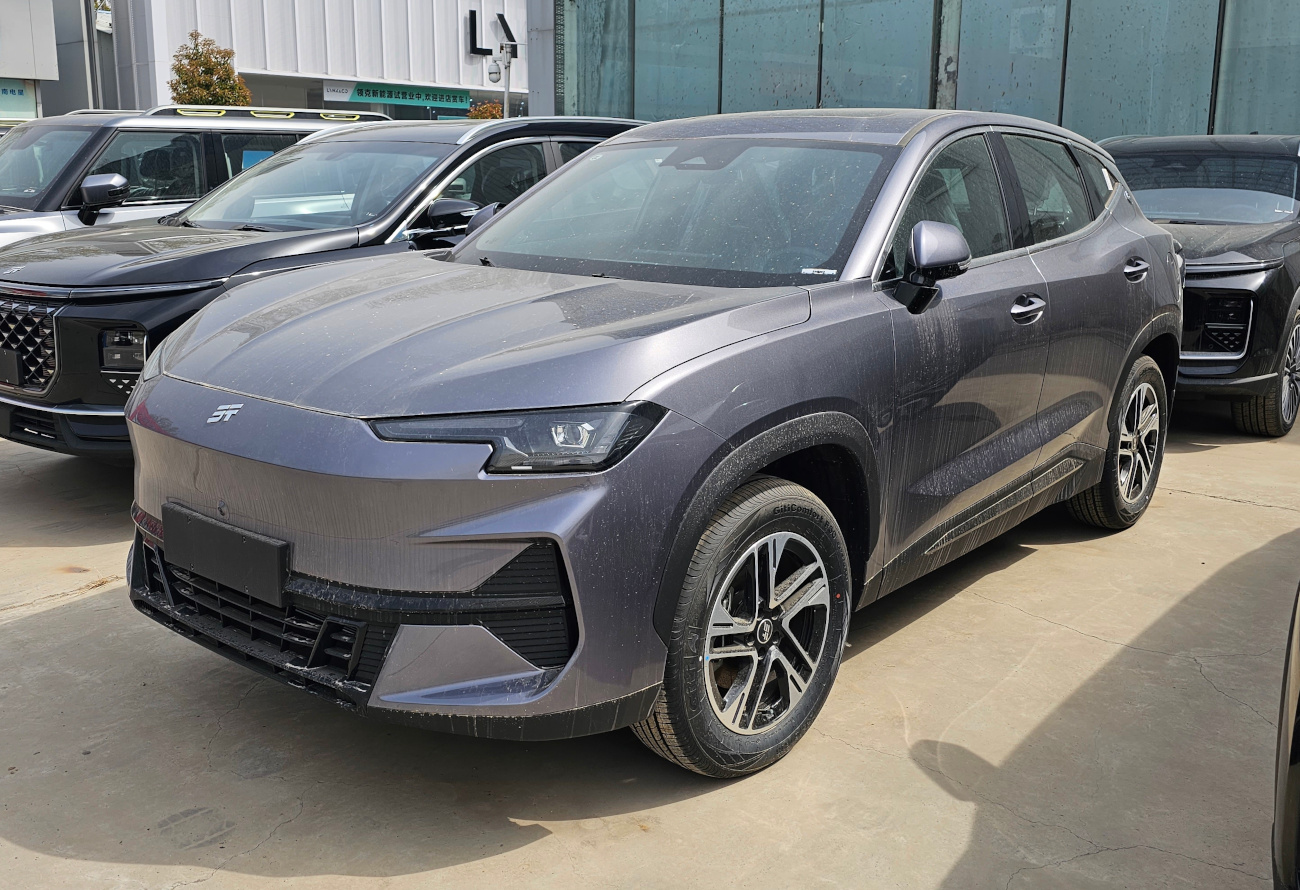
Jetour Shanhai L6

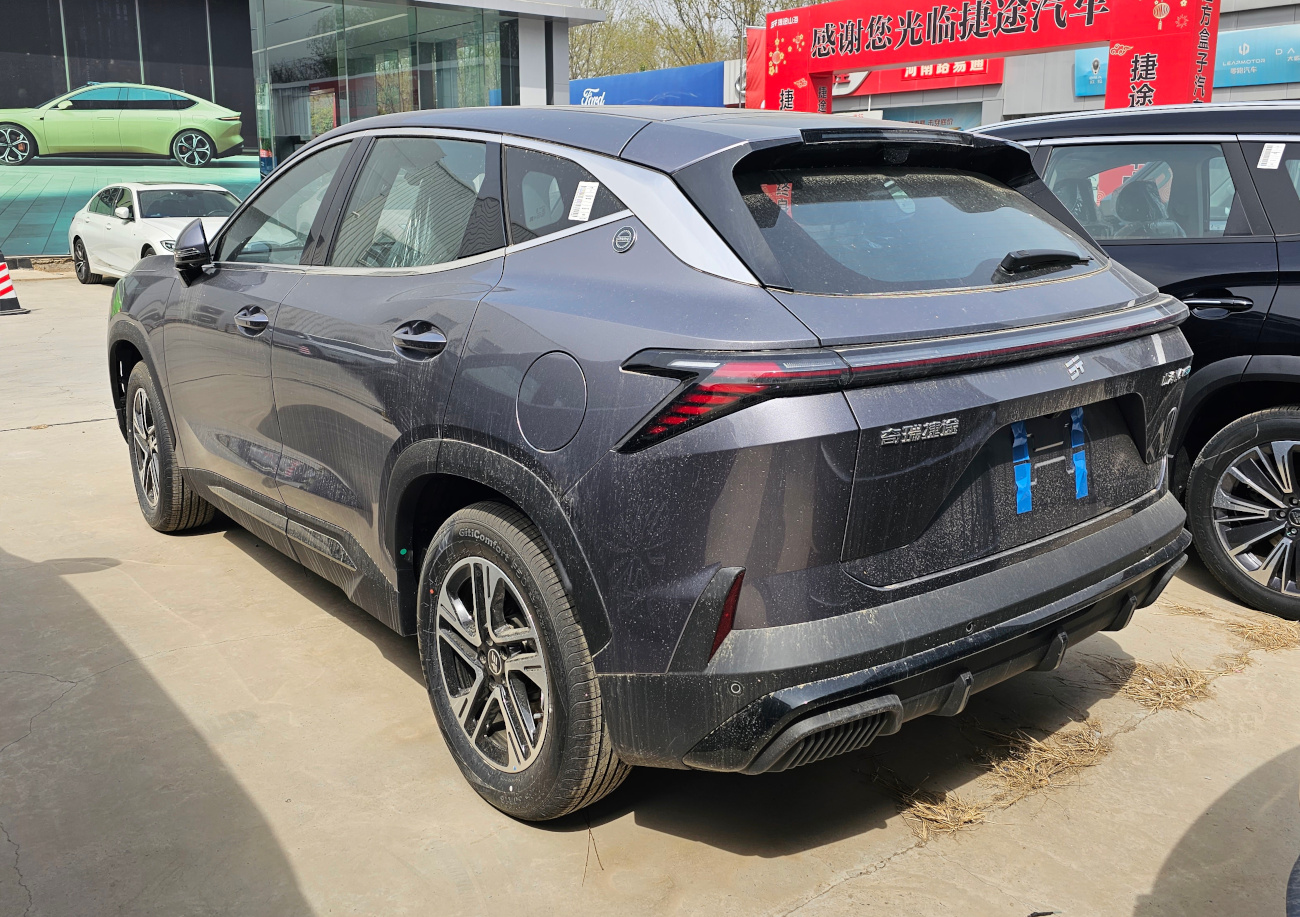
Rear view

== Powertrain ==
The Dashing is available in both conventional petrol and PHEV plug-in hybrid versions. The conventional petrol version offers two engine options: a 1.5-litre turbo engine paired with either a 6-speed manual transmission or a 6-speed dual-clutch transmission, and a 1.6-litre turbo engine paired with a 7-speed dual-clutch gearbox. The 1.5-litre turbo engine develops 115 kW (156 PS; 154 hp) at 5,500 rpm with 230 N⋅m (170 lbf⋅ft) of torque between 1,750 and 4,000 rpm. The 1.6-litre turbo engine develops a maximum power of 145 kW (197 PS; 194 hp) with 290 N⋅m (214 lbf⋅ft) of torque between 2,000 and 4,000 rpm. The PHEV version is equipped with a 1.5-litre turbo engine and a 3-gear DHT gearbox delivering a maximum power of 240 kW (326 PS; 322 hp) and peak torque of 565 N⋅m (417 lbf⋅ft), while featuring a pure electric cruising range of 100 km (62 mi), and fuel consumption of 1L/100 km.

Specs
Model	Years	Transmission	Power@rpm	Torque@rpm
Petrol
1.5 L Turbo	2022–present	6-speed DCT	115 kW (156 PS; 154 hp) at 5,500 rpm	230 N⋅m (170 lb⋅ft; 23 kg⋅m) at 1,750–4,000 rpm
1.6 L Turbo	2022–present	7-speed DCT	145 kW (197 PS; 194 hp) at 5,500 rpm	290 N⋅m (214 lb⋅ft; 30 kg⋅m) at 2,000–4,000 rpm
Plug-in hybrid
1.5 L Turbo Hybrid	2022–present	3-speed DHT	240 kW (326 PS; 322 hp)	545 N⋅m (402 lb⋅ft; 56 kg⋅m)

== Markets ==
=== Africa ===
==== South Africa ====
The Dashing was launched in South Africa on 21 September 2024, alongside the X70 Plus as part of Jetour's entry to the market. It is available in two trim levels: Momentum and Deluxe; it is powered by a 1.5-litre turbocharged petrol engine.

=== Asia ===
==== Indonesia ====
The Dashing was introduced in Indonesia in July 2024 at the 31st Gaikindo Indonesia International Auto Show. Both Dashing and X70 Plus went on sale in 15 November 2024. As one of Jetour's first models sold in Indonesia, available variants for the Dashing are the Journey and Inspira. It is only available with a 1.5-litre turbocharged petrol engine. It is locally assembled at Handal Indonesia Motor's facility in Bekasi, West Java, with production commenced on 30 October 2024.

==== Malaysia ====
The Dashing was introduced in Malaysia in May 2024 at the Malaysia Autoshow, and was launched on 9 April 2025 as part of Jetour's entry to the market. It is available in two variants: Prime and Signature; it is powered by a 1.5-litre turbocharged petrol engine. At launch, the first 100 units sold were fully imported from China before local assembly commenced.

==== Pakistan ====
The Dashing was launched on 20 February 2025, alongside the X70 Plus as part of Jetour's entry to the market. It is available in a sole unnamed variant powered by a 1.5-litre turbocharged petrol engine.

==== Philippines ====
The Dashing was launched in the Philippines on 15 March 2023 as part of Jetour's entry to the market. At launch, it is available in a sole variant powered by a 1.5-litre turbocharged petrol engine. The Symphony variant was added in February 2024 equipped with a bespoke audio system from American brand JL Audio. The Dashing PHEV was available in April 2024, it was limited model with an initial allocation set at 10 units.

=== Latin America ===
==== Argentina ====
The Dashing was launched in Argentina on 29 October 2024, in the sole unnamed variant powered by a 1.6-litre turbocharged petrol engine.

==== Mexico ====
The Dashing was launched in Mexico on 9 October 2023 in the sole unnamed variant powered by a 1.6-litre turbocharged petrol engine.

== Sales ==
Year	China			Mexico	Malaysia	Indonesia
Year	Dashing	i-DM	Shanhai L6	Mexico	Malaysia	Indonesia
2023	30,228	6,100	—	524	—	—
2024	41,407	1,371	3,524	1,038	1	—
2025	26,401	22	3,776	442	2,165	553
