= Jetour T1 =

Compact crossover SUV

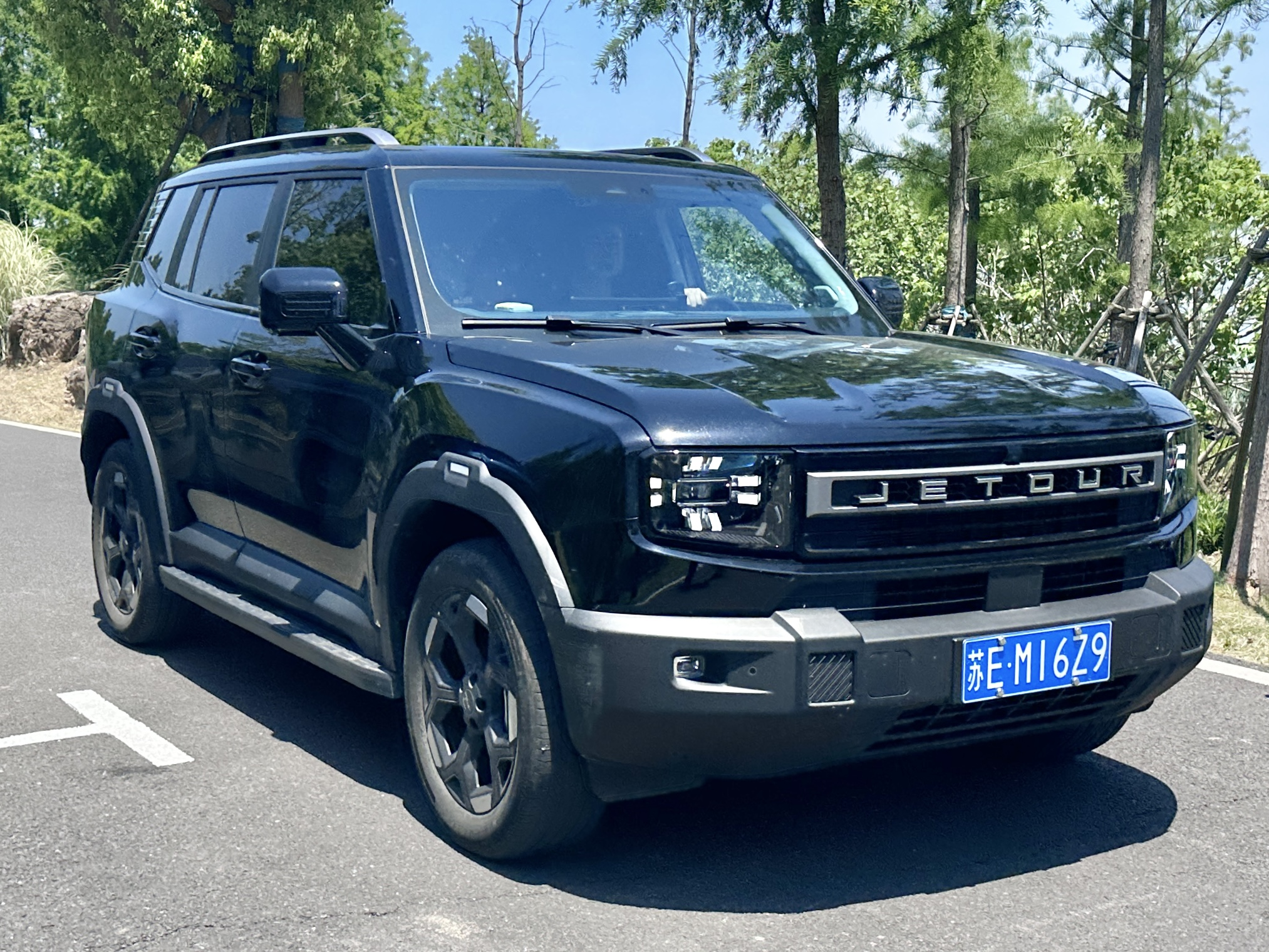

Overview
- Manufacturer: Jetour
- Also called: Jetour Freedom (捷途自由者; Jiétú Zìyóuzhě) (China); Jetour Shanhai T1 (plug-in hybrid, China); Jetour Freedom 7 Plus (China, 2026–present); Tissan T1 (Iran)
- Production: 2024–present
- Assembly: China: Fuzhou, Fujian; Indonesia: Bekasi, West Java (HIM); Malaysia: Johor Bahru (Berjaya Assembly)

Body and chassis
- Class: Compact crossover SUV
- Body style: 5-door SUV
- Layout: Transverse front-engine, front-wheel drive; Transverse front-engine, four-wheel drive
- Platform: Kunlun architecture
- Chassis: Unibody
- Related: Jetour T2

Powertrain
- Engine: Petrol: 1.5 L SQRG4J15 turbo I4; 2.0 L SQRF4J20 turbo I4; Petrol plug-in hybrid: 1.5 L SQRH4J15 turbo I4
- Electric motor: PMSM
- Transmission: 7-speed dual-clutch; 8-speed automatic; 1-speed DHT
- Hybrid drivetrain: Series-parallel plug-in hybrid
- Battery: 18.3 kWh LFP Gotion; 26.2 kWh LFP Deyi; 26.7 kWh LFP CALB; 27.2 kWh LFP Gotion; 43.2 kWh LFP CATL
- Electric range: 76–175 km (47–109 mi) (WLTP); 100–226 km (62–140 mi) (CLTC)

Dimensions
- Wheelbase: 2,810 mm (110.6 in); 2,800 mm (110.2 in) (Freedom 7)
- Length: 4,706 mm (185.3 in); 4,651 mm (183.1 in) (Freedom 7)
- Width: 1,967 mm (77.4 in)
- Height: 1,845 mm (72.6 in)
- Curb weight: 1,656–1,811 kg (3,651–3,993 lb) (petrol); 2,000 kg (4,409 lb) (plug-in hybrid)

The Jetour T1 is a compact crossover SUV manufactured by Jetour since 2024. In China, it is marketed under two names, the Jetour Freedom (Chinese: 捷途自由者; pinyin: Jiétú Zìyóuzhě) and the Jetour Shanhai T1 (Chinese: 山海T1; lit. 'Mountain sea T1') for the plug-in hybrid version.

== Overview ==
The Shanhai T1 was shown at the 2024 Beijing Auto Show. and was first introduced on 27 October 2024 in China as a plug-in hybrid only model. Later in February 2025, a non-hybrid petrol engine version went on sale in China as the Jetour Freedom.

The Freedom was designed with mild off-road capabilities with an approach angle of 28 degrees, a departure angle of 29 degrees, a minimum ground clearance of 200 mm (7.9 in), and a claimed wading depth of 700 mm (27.6 in).

The Freedom is equipped with a 12.8 or 15.6-inch central infotainment screen with a built-in Qualcomm Snapdragon 8155 system on a chip, and a 10.25-inch full LCD instrument panel.

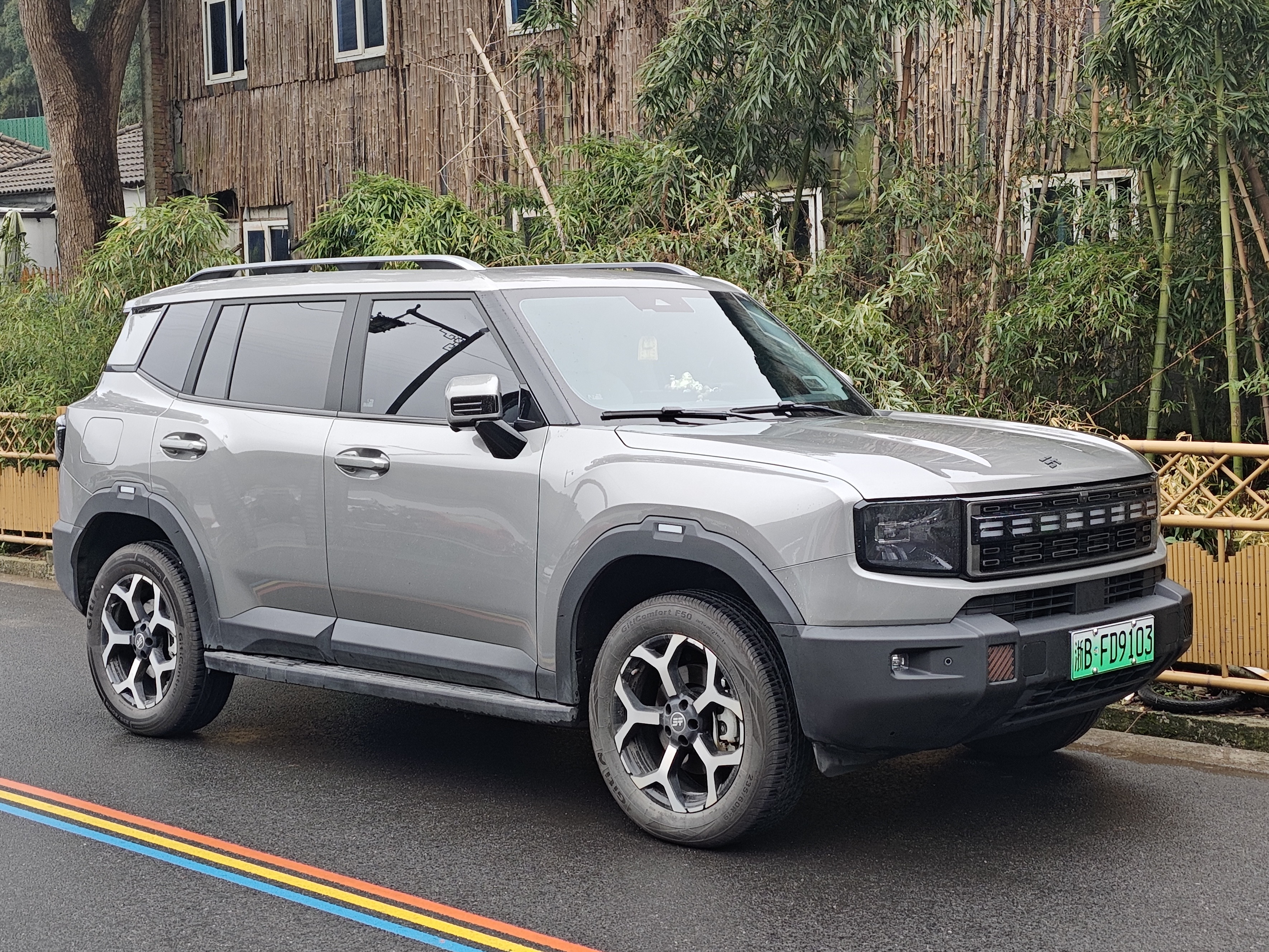
Jetour Shanhai T1

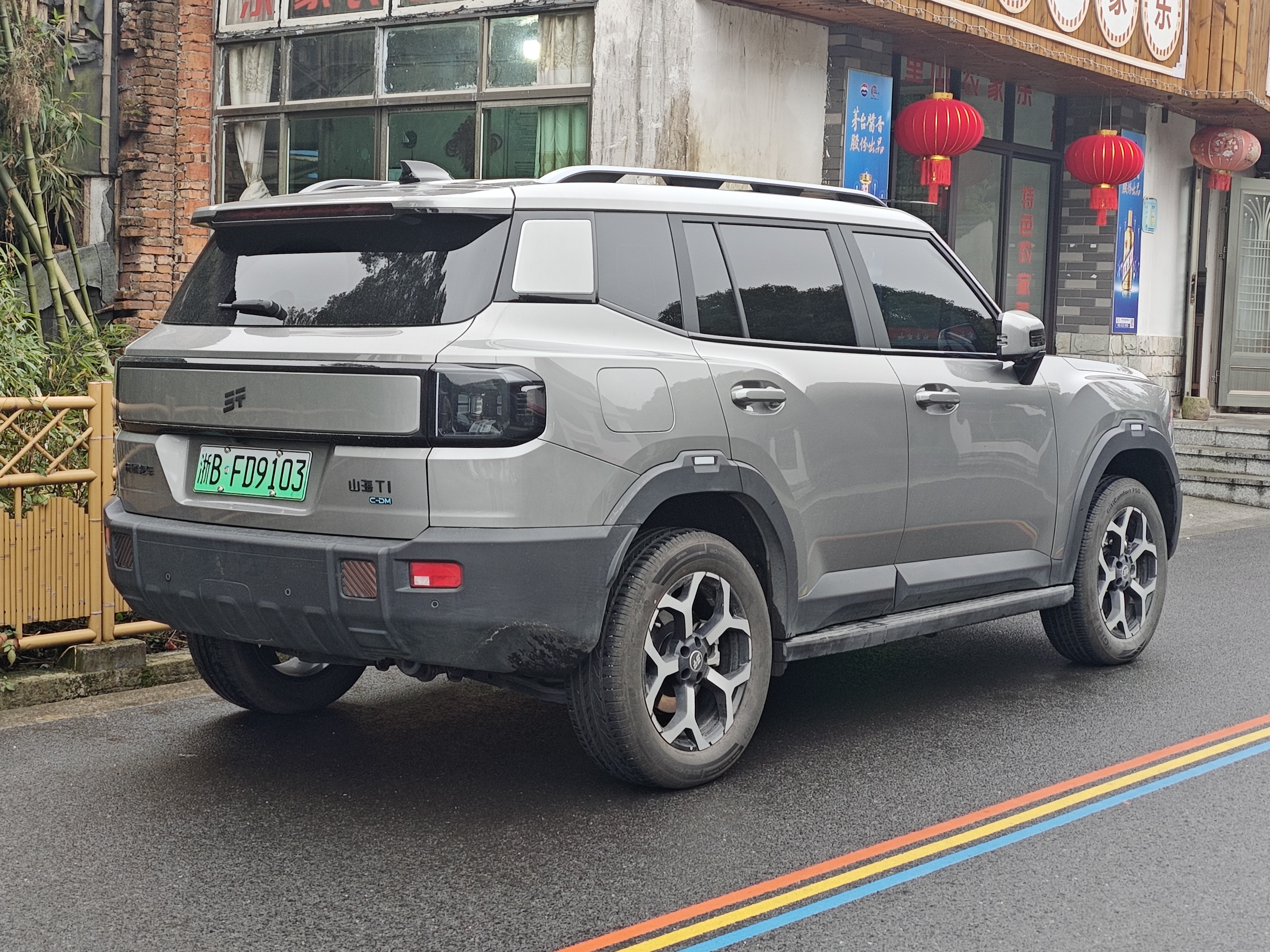
Rear view

== Jetour Freedom 7 ==
On 4 November 2026 the Chery launched as the Jetour Freedom 7 (Chinese: 捷途自由者7; pinyin: Jiétú zìyóuzhě 7) in China, which is similar to the original petrol-powered Freedom but has a 10 mm (0.4 in) shorter wheelbase of 2,800 mm (110.2 in) and 55 mm (2.2 in) shorter overall length of 4,651 mm (183.1 in). It shares its overall styling and front-wheel drive 1.5-liter petrol powertrain with the Freedom, but Chery says it is positioned to better meet the needs of urban commuters, while the original Freedom is now marketed as the Freedom 7 Plus and is intended to target those with off-road needs and is available exclusively with the 2.0-liter four-wheel drive powertrain. The Freedom 7 Plus C-DM launched the same day is identical to the Shanhai T1 but is only available with the front-wheel drive powertrain.

== Markets ==
Outside of China, the vehicle is marketed as the Jetour T1.

=== Argentina ===
The T1 was launched in Argentina on 22 August 2025, in the sole unnamed variant powered by the 2.0-litre turbocharged petrol engine equipped with all-wheel drive.

In January 2026, the i-DM model using the 1.5-litre petrol plug-in hybrid equipped with front-wheel drive was introduced in Argentina.

=== Brazil ===
The T1 was launched in Brazil on 27 January 2026, with two trim levels: Advance and Premium, it is powered by the 1.5-litre petrol plug-in hybrid equipped with front-wheel drive.

=== Indonesia ===
The T1 was launched in Indonesia on 3 June 2026. It is available with two unnamed variants, powered by either a 1.5-litre turbocharged petrol or a 1.5-litre turbocharged turbocharged petrol plug-in hybrid (i-DM).

=== Malaysia ===
The T1 was launched in Malaysia on 22 July 2026. It is available with two variants: a 1.5-litre turbocharged petrol 2WD and a 2.0-litre turbocharged petrol XWD.

=== Mexico ===
The T1 was launched in Mexico on 1 August 2025, with three trim levels: Adventure, Savage and Wild. For powertrains, the Adventure and Savage trims use the 1.5-litre turbocharged petrol with front-wheel drive, while the Wild trim use the 2.0-litre turbocharged petrol with all-wheel drive.

In November 2025, the i-DM model using the 1.5-litre petrol plug-in hybrid equipped with front-wheel drive was introduced in Mexico for the Savage trim.

=== Philippines ===
The T1 was launched in the Philippines on 23 October 2025, in the sole Lightning i-DM variant powered by the 1.5-litre turbocharged petrol plug-in hybrid.

In February 2026, the Premium variant was introduced and is powered by the 1.5-litre turbocharged petrol plug-in hybrid.

=== Saudi Arabia ===
The T1 had its global launch in Riyadh on 20 February 2025. It comes with two turbocharged engine options equipped with all-wheel drive: a 1.5-litre petrol producing 125 kW (170 PS; 168 hp) and 270 N⋅m (199 lb⋅ft; 28 kg⋅m) of torque, and a 2.0-litre petrol producing 180 kW (245 PS; 241 hp) and 375 N⋅m (277 lb⋅ft; 38 kg⋅m) of torque.

=== South Africa ===
The T1 was launched in South Africa on 27 October 2025, alongside the Jetour T2. It is available with four trim levels: Edge, Aspira, Xplora and Odyssey. For powertrains, it is available with either 1.5-litre and 2.0-litre turbocharged petrols, with all-wheel drive standard on the latter engine. In April 2026, the i-DM model using the 1.5-litre petrol plug-in hybrid was introduced in South Africa as the flagship variant.

=== UAE ===
The T1 was unveiled in Dubai on 16 December 2024, with deliveries of the sole petrol version with the 2.0-litre turbocharged petrol expected commenced in April 2025, and the plug-in hybrid version arrived later in late 2025.

== Powertrain ==
=== Plug-in hybrid ===
The Shanhai T1 plug-in hybrid powertrain consists of a 1.5-litre turbocharged petrol engine codenamed SQRH4J15 outputting 141 hp (105 kW; 143 PS) net and 220 N⋅m (162 lb⋅ft; 22 kg⋅m) of torque paired with a 1-speed series-parallel dedicated hybrid transmission initially available exclusively in front-wheel drive, along with a 150 kW (204 PS; 201 hp) front motor codenamed KPTZ220YMDA0 and 26.7 kWh LFP battery pack, which provides 117 km (73 mi) WLTP electric range rating and can recharge from 30–80% in 30 minutes at a peak charge rate of 41 kW.

In May 2025, two new front-wheel drive variants were added using the same engine and motors but with different battery packs. A smaller 18.3 kWh pack supplied by Gotion offers 76 kilometres (47 mi) of WLTP electric range and can also recharge from 30–80% in 30 minutes at a peak charge rate of 41 kW. The larger 43.2 kWh LFP pack supplied by CATL provides 175 kilometres (109 mi) of electric range and can recharge from 30–80% in 37 minutes at a peak charge rate of 41 kW.

The all-wheel-drive version was also launched in May 2025 and consists of the same engine and front motor but adds a 175 kW (238 PS; 235 hp) motor codenamed TZ190XYCY2 to drive the rear axle, for a combined output of 577 hp (430 kW; 585 PS). It uses either a slightly larger 27.2 kWh battery with the WLTP electric-only range of 115 kilometres (71 mi) or the same 43.2 kWh battery for 170 kilometres (106 mi) of electric range.

In June 2026, the all-wheel drive variants were updated to use a more powerful 190 kW (258 PS; 255 hp) rear motor codenamed TZ190XY3L1, for a new total output of 597 horsepower (445 kW; 605 PS).

In November 2026, the Jetour Freedom 7 Plus C-DM launched with a near identical powertrain as the front-wheel drive Shanhai T1, but it uses a 26.6 kWh LFP battery pack supplied by Chery-backed Anhui Deyi. Like the Shanhai T1's battery pack, it provides a WLTP electric range rating of and can recharge from 30–80% in 30 minutes at a peak charge rate of 41 kW.

=== Petrol ===
The petrol-only models have two available powertrains with a transverse engine layout. The standard engine is a 1.5-litre turbocharged inline-4 with 11.6:1 compression ratio and a bore and stroke of 74.5 mm × 86.0 mm (2.93 in × 3.39 in), outputting 168 hp (125 kW; 170 PS) net power and is paired with a 7-speed dual clutch transmission exclusively in front-wheel drive. The upgrade option is a 2.0-litre turbocharged inline-4 with 10.2:1 compression ratio with bore and stroke of 80.5 mm × 98.1 mm (3.17 in × 3.86 in), outputting 241 hp (180 kW; 244 PS) net power and paired with an 8-speed torque converter automatic and is available in either front-wheel or all-wheel drive.

Specifications (Plug-in hybrid)
Years	Battery		Engine			Motor		Combined		Electric range		30–80% charge	Top speed
Years	Type	Weight	Net	Gross	Torque	Power	Torque	Power	Torque	WLTP	CLTC	30–80% charge	Top speed
2024–present	26.7 kWh LFP CALB	242 kg (534 lb)	105 kW (143 PS; 141 hp) at 5,200 rpm	115 kW (156 PS; 154 hp)	220 N⋅m (162 lb⋅ft; 22.4 kg⋅m) at 2,500 rpm	Front: 150 kW (204 PS; 201 hp)	Front: 310 N⋅m (229 lb⋅ft; 31.6 kg⋅m)	342 hp (255 kW; 347 PS)	530 N⋅m (391 lb⋅ft; 54.0 kg⋅m)	117 km (73 mi)	150 km (93 mi)	30 min	180 km/h (112 mph)
2025–present	18.3 kWh LFP Gotion	165 kg (364 lb)	105 kW (143 PS; 141 hp) at 5,200 rpm	115 kW (156 PS; 154 hp)	220 N⋅m (162 lb⋅ft; 22.4 kg⋅m) at 2,500 rpm	Front: 150 kW (204 PS; 201 hp)	Front: 310 N⋅m (229 lb⋅ft; 31.6 kg⋅m)	342 hp (255 kW; 347 PS)	530 N⋅m (391 lb⋅ft; 54.0 kg⋅m)	76 km (47 mi)	100 km (62 mi)	30 min	180 km/h (112 mph)
2025–present	43.2 kWh LFP CATL	317 kg (699 lb)	105 kW (143 PS; 141 hp) at 5,200 rpm	115 kW (156 PS; 154 hp)	220 N⋅m (162 lb⋅ft; 22.4 kg⋅m) at 2,500 rpm	Front: 150 kW (204 PS; 201 hp)	Front: 310 N⋅m (229 lb⋅ft; 31.6 kg⋅m)	342 hp (255 kW; 347 PS)	530 N⋅m (391 lb⋅ft; 54.0 kg⋅m)	175 km (109 mi)	226 km (140 mi)	37 min	180 km/h (112 mph)
2026–present	26.6 kWh LFP Deyi	259 kg (571 lb)	105 kW (143 PS; 141 hp) at 5,200 rpm	115 kW (156 PS; 154 hp)	220 N⋅m (162 lb⋅ft; 22.4 kg⋅m) at 2,500 rpm	Front: 150 kW (204 PS; 201 hp)	Front: 310 N⋅m (229 lb⋅ft; 31.6 kg⋅m)	342 hp (255 kW; 347 PS)	530 N⋅m (391 lb⋅ft; 54.0 kg⋅m)	117 km (73 mi)	150 km (93 mi)	30 min	180 km/h (112 mph)
2025–present	27.2 kWh LFP Gotion	253 kg (558 lb)	105 kW (143 PS; 141 hp) at 5,200 rpm	115 kW (156 PS; 154 hp)	220 N⋅m (162 lb⋅ft; 22.4 kg⋅m) at 2,500 rpm	Front: 150 kW (204 PS; 201 hp) Rear: 175 kW (238 PS; 235 hp)	Front: 310 N⋅m (229 lb⋅ft; 31.6 kg⋅m) Rear: 310 N⋅m (229 lb⋅ft; 31.6 kg⋅m)	577 hp (430 kW; 585 PS)	840 N⋅m (620 lb⋅ft; 85.7 kg⋅m)	115 km (71 mi)	147 km (91 mi)	30 min	200 km/h (124 mph)
2025–present	43.2 kWh LFP CATL	317 kg (699 lb)	105 kW (143 PS; 141 hp) at 5,200 rpm	115 kW (156 PS; 154 hp)	220 N⋅m (162 lb⋅ft; 22.4 kg⋅m) at 2,500 rpm	Front: 150 kW (204 PS; 201 hp) Rear: 175 kW (238 PS; 235 hp)	Front: 310 N⋅m (229 lb⋅ft; 31.6 kg⋅m) Rear: 310 N⋅m (229 lb⋅ft; 31.6 kg⋅m)	577 hp (430 kW; 585 PS)	840 N⋅m (620 lb⋅ft; 85.7 kg⋅m)	170 km (106 mi)	220 km (137 mi)	37 min	200 km/h (124 mph)
2026–present	27.2 kWh LFP Gotion	253 kg (558 lb)	105 kW (143 PS; 141 hp) at 5,200 rpm	115 kW (156 PS; 154 hp)	220 N⋅m (162 lb⋅ft; 22.4 kg⋅m) at 2,500 rpm	Front: 150 kW (204 PS; 201 hp) Rear: 190 kW (258 PS; 255 hp)	Front: 310 N⋅m (229 lb⋅ft; 31.6 kg⋅m) Rear: 345 N⋅m (254 lb⋅ft; 35.2 kg⋅m)	597 hp (445 kW; 605 PS)	875 N⋅m (645 lb⋅ft; 89.2 kg⋅m)	115 km (71 mi)	150 km (93 mi)	30 min	180 km/h (112 mph)
2026–present	43.2 kWh LFP CATL	317 kg (699 lb)	105 kW (143 PS; 141 hp) at 5,200 rpm	115 kW (156 PS; 154 hp)	220 N⋅m (162 lb⋅ft; 22.4 kg⋅m) at 2,500 rpm	Front: 150 kW (204 PS; 201 hp) Rear: 190 kW (258 PS; 255 hp)	Front: 310 N⋅m (229 lb⋅ft; 31.6 kg⋅m) Rear: 345 N⋅m (254 lb⋅ft; 35.2 kg⋅m)	597 hp (445 kW; 605 PS)	875 N⋅m (645 lb⋅ft; 89.2 kg⋅m)	170 km (106 mi)	220 km (137 mi)	37 min	180 km/h (112 mph)

Specifications (Petrol)
Engine		Years	Transmission	Power		Torque	0–100 km/h (62 mph)	Top speed
Type	Code	Years	Transmission	Net	Gross	Torque	0–100 km/h (62 mph)	Top speed
1.5 L turbo	SQRG4J15	2025–present	7-speed DCT	125 kW (170 PS; 168 hp) at 5,500 rpm	135 kW (184 PS; 181 hp)	290 N⋅m (214 lb⋅ft; 29.6 kg⋅m) at 2,000–3,500 rpm		180 km/h (112 mph)
2.0 L turbo	SQRG4J20	2025–present	8-speed automatic	180 kW (245 PS; 241 hp) at 5,500 rpm	187 kW (254 PS; 251 hp)	390 N⋅m (288 lb⋅ft; 39.8 kg⋅m) at 1,750–4,000 rpm	8.6 s (FWD); 8.8 s (AWD)	180 km/h (112 mph)

== Safety ==
ASEAN NCAP test results Jetour T1 (2025)
Test	Points
Overall:	5 /5 stars
Adult occupant:	38.09
Child occupant:	16.18
Safety assist:	17.14
Motorcyclist Safety:	16.25

== Sales ==
Year	China		Mexico	
Year	Freedom	Shanhai T1	T1	i-DM
2024	—	5,236	—	—
2025	42,620	24,163	301	71
