= 7W =

7W or 7-W may refer to:

Units of measurement

- 7°W, or 7th meridian west, a longitude coordinate
- 7 watts
- 7 weeks
- 7 wins, abbreviated in a Win–loss record (pitching)

Transportation

- 7W, IATA code for Wind Rose Aviation
- Ford 7W a passenger car built in the UK in the 1930s
- Spartan 7W Executive, a model of Spartan Executive aircraft

== See also ==
- W7 (disambiguation)
