= Component speaker =

A set of component speakers is a car audio speaker system in which the speakers are matched for optimal sound quality. Typically, a pair of tweeters and mid-bass drivers are matched with a crossover to limit the frequency range for each type of speaker to those that it can accurately reproduce. Component speaker drivers are physically separated so that the tweeter, which is very directional, can be placed in an optimal position, usually on the dashboard facing the listener, while the larger mid-bass drivers can be placed anywhere there is room, often in the lower front of the car doors. Component speaker pairs are offered by all high-end audio manufacturers.
