= JL Audio =

American consumer audio company

- Type: Consumer and professional audio manufacturer
- Industry: Audio
- Founded: 1975 (Speaker Warehouse)
- Founder: James Birch; Lucio Proni
- Headquarters: Miramar, FL
- Products: Audio electronics
- Parent: Garmin (2023–present)
- Website: jlaudio.com

JL Audio is an American manufacturer of consumer audio products. Known as one of the pioneers of the car audio industry, it manufactures marine, home, and mobile audio products, but are best known for their subwoofers.

On September 20, 2023, Garmin completed the acquisition of the company and announced that JL Audio will join its marine segment.

== History ==
=== Formation ===
JL Audio was founded in 1975 by James Birch and Lucio Proni. They used the first letter of each of their names, to form a company name, hence "JL." Their first products were home speaker systems as well as home speaker kits.

=== Speaker Warehouse ===
In 1977, when business did not turn out as well as expected, Stephen Seidl, Birch and Proni invested in a retail store in Hollywood, Florida, called Speaker Warehouse which focused mainly on speaker repair and the sale of speakers, individually or as whole speaker sets. The original company, JL Audio, was still in operation during this time. As the businesses grew, Speaker Warehouse essentially became a dealer of JL Audio products under the direction of Stephen Seidl.

In the late 1970s and early 1980s, as the car audio revolution was starting to take place, Speaker Warehouse was a big seller of the early pioneering car audio products. Stephen Seidl, Birch and Proni used their knowledge of speakers and audio to experiment with these systems, especially with component systems with subwoofers. By the early 1980s, Speaker Warehouse had become known as a place to go for high-end audio in South Florida.

== Notable events ==
- In 1975, JL Audio is formed.
- In 1979, Speaker Warehouse is purchased by JL Audio.
- From 1987–1988, Speaker Warehouse began to design competition cars with their audio systems.
- In 1988, Speaker Warehouse/JL Audio dominates the car audio scene in South Florida.
- In 1989, seven Speaker Warehouse vehicles qualified for the first annual International Auto Sound Challenge Association (IASCA) Finals in Tempe, Arizona.
- In the early 1990s, JL Audio becomes known across the United States and Canada after winning several awards in car audio competitions.
- In 1991, JL Audio exhibits at the Consumer Electronics Show for the first time. Iso-Plate mounting baffles, designed to facilitate isobaric mounting, were introduced. Additionally, the W2 and W5 subwoofer driver lines were introduced to an international audience for the first time.
- In 1992, W1 series subwoofer drivers were introduced. These speakers introduced the concept of a small box/long excursion woofer designs for car audio. The CS-1 series was also introduced, JL Audio's first component speaker introduction.
- In 1993, the W6-series subwoofer drivers are introduced in 8, 10, 12 and 15-inch sizes. This product was considered unique for its dual 6-ohm voice coil system design. These subwoofers were in production for ten years.
- In 1994, JL Audio introduces the W4 and IB4 series subwoofers and infinite baffle woofers. Also introduced were the CS-3 component systems. JL Audio introduced a 1961 Austin Mini demo vehicle, featuring three 10W6 subwoofer drivers, which was named "Best Sounding Demo Vehicle" by Autosound and Security Magazine
- In 1995, JL Audio introduces the first group of Stealthbox vehicle-specific subwoofers. Three brand new enclosed systems were introduced this year: PowerWedge (now a name of the past), ProWedge, and MicroSub.
- In 1996, Andy Oxenhorn, former president of MB Quart USA, becomes president of JL Audio. Under his leadership, the company experiences a great deal of growth in the forthcoming years. JL Audio's Stealthbox, PowerWedge, and MicroSub lines are expanded. The WØ subwoofer line is also introduced for consumers seeking a moderately priced subwoofer alternative. The WØ subwoofer line utilizes JL Audio's first patented technology, the VRC (Vented Reinforcement Collar).
- In 1997, JL Audio begins work on a new line of component speakers and coaxials. Several new Stealthbox and PowerWedge models and the 8.3 MicroSub are introduced. The 18W6 is added to the W6 product line. Chrome versions of the W6 subwoofers are also launched.
- In 1998, JL Audio launches the Evolution line of Evolution component speakers and coaxials. The WØ line is expanded to include 8-inch and 15-inch drivers. JL Audio moves its headquarters to a 92,000 square-foot facility in Miramar, FL.
- In 1998, W3 subwoofers are introduced. The Stealthbox, PowerWedge and Evolution lineups are further expanded with new models and replacements for old models. In this same year, Jeff Scoon, Bruce Macmillan and David Krich establish a new engineering department for JL Audio electronics in Phoenix, Arizona.
- In 2000, JL Audio launches its first electronics products: the Slash series amplifiers. These amplifiers went on to become the best-selling mobile audio amplifiers of all time. The Slash series amplifiers introduced JL Audio's R.I.P.S. technology and Advanced Rollback Protection Features, Controls & Connections. Slash series amps remain in production today. Additionally, the 6WØ, 15W3 an d18W3 are added to JL Audio's subwoofer lineup. The 3-way XR Component System and a more economical line of vehicle-specific enclosures called "Vantage" are also introduced.
- In 2001, after over six years of engineering, W7 subwoofers are unveiled, featuring several patented technologies. These subwoofers eventually paved the way for JL Audio's entrance into the realm of home audio. New Evolution, Stealthbox, enclosed subwoofer systems, and amplifier models are introduced, as well has the High Output H.O. Wedge enclosed subwoofer systems and the 500/5 Slash amplifier.
- In 2002, W6v2 subwoofers are added to the line. These subs include most of the technology introduced by the W7 drivers but are lighter weight and more economical. The W6v2 remain in production today. W3v2 subwoofers are also launched, featuring patented Elevated Frame Cooling to the W3 platform. The 1000/1 Slash amplifier is also introduced, along with more Stealthbox models.
- In 2003, e-series amplifiers are introduced. JL Audio also begins production of connection products, with the introduction of the ECS (Engineered Connection Systems) line. The 8W7 is added to the W7 line and the 13W6v2 is added to the W6v2 line. The final edition of the W6 line of subwoofers is launched, named W6AE (Anniversary Edition). The original W1 subwoofers are discontinued after 11 years of production. JL Audio acquires Total Mobile Audio as an entry-level line to its dealers.
- In 2004, JL Audio enters the home audio market with the Fathom and Gotham powered subwoofer systems. These feature variants of the W7 subwoofers, which are powered by JL Audio's amplifier designs combined with A.R.O. (Automatic Room Optimization) circuitry. The Evolution line is expanded to include ZR component systems. Two new e-series amplifiers are also added to the line, the e1400D and e1800D. The W6 product line reaches the end of its eleven-year production run.
- In 2005, JL Audio ventures into two new categories: Marine Audio and OEM Integration. JL Audio introduces a 7.7-inch component system to the marine world In the realm of OEM integration, JL Audio introduces the CleanSweep CL441dsp This DSP-based device allows users to eliminate frequency related errors associated with standard factory systems. This same year, W1v2 products are introduced, marking the second version of the discontinued W1 subwoofers.
- In 2006, JL Audio launches the W3v3 line of subwoofer drivers. A-series amplifiers are also introduced, replacing the e-series. The CL-SSI and CL-SES are also introduced to the CleanSweep OEM integration category. The Fathom home subwoofer models are named "Subwoofer of the Year" and "Product of the Year" by several major home audio industry publications.
- In 2007, the 13TW5 subwoofer is introduced. The 13.5-inch woofer has a mounting depth of 2.5 inches and is designed to work in very small enclosures. The Evolution line launches the C5 line of coaxial and component systems. Slash amplifiers are updated with heat sink designs and cosmetics, becoming the Slash v2 amplifiers. The Stealthbox line surpasses 90 different models.
- In 2008, JL Audio introduces the HD series mobile amplifiers, featuring a new technology called Single Cycle Control. Other new product launches include G-series amplifiers, new mobile and marine loudspeakers models, an updated TMA (Total Mobile Audio) amplifier lineup and a patent-pending power wire called MetaWire. JL Audio begins shipping the Fathom f110 and f212-powered subwoofers. At the CEDIA-Expo in September, JL Audio also introduces the Fathom In-Wall Subwoofer System, which is based on the 13TW5 driver.
- In 2009, C3 Convertible Component Systems are introduced, along with MX Marine Component Speakers and the second version of the WØ subwoofers, appropriately named WØv2 drivers.
- In 2010, XD amplifiers apply JL Audio's switching amplifier technology to mainstream price points. Entry-level WX subwoofers and JX amplifiers are introduced as the Total Mobile Audio brand is phased out. In the home audio realm, the Fathom IWS In-Wall home subwoofer systems are released, featuring the 13TW5 thin-line subwoofer driver.
- In 2011, W7AE (Anniversary Edition) subwoofers are released, marking the 10th anniversary of the launch of the W7. The HD1200/1 is added the HD amplifier lineup as the most powerful amplifier in the JL Audio line. New XD models are introduced, as well as M-Series amplifiers for the marine line. The third version of the WØ line of subwoofers, named WØv3, are also launched.
- In 2023, Garmin announced on September 20 that it had completed the acquisition of JL Audio. The acquisition was intended to add premium audio integration solution across a broad range of Garmin markets and products.

== Notable products ==
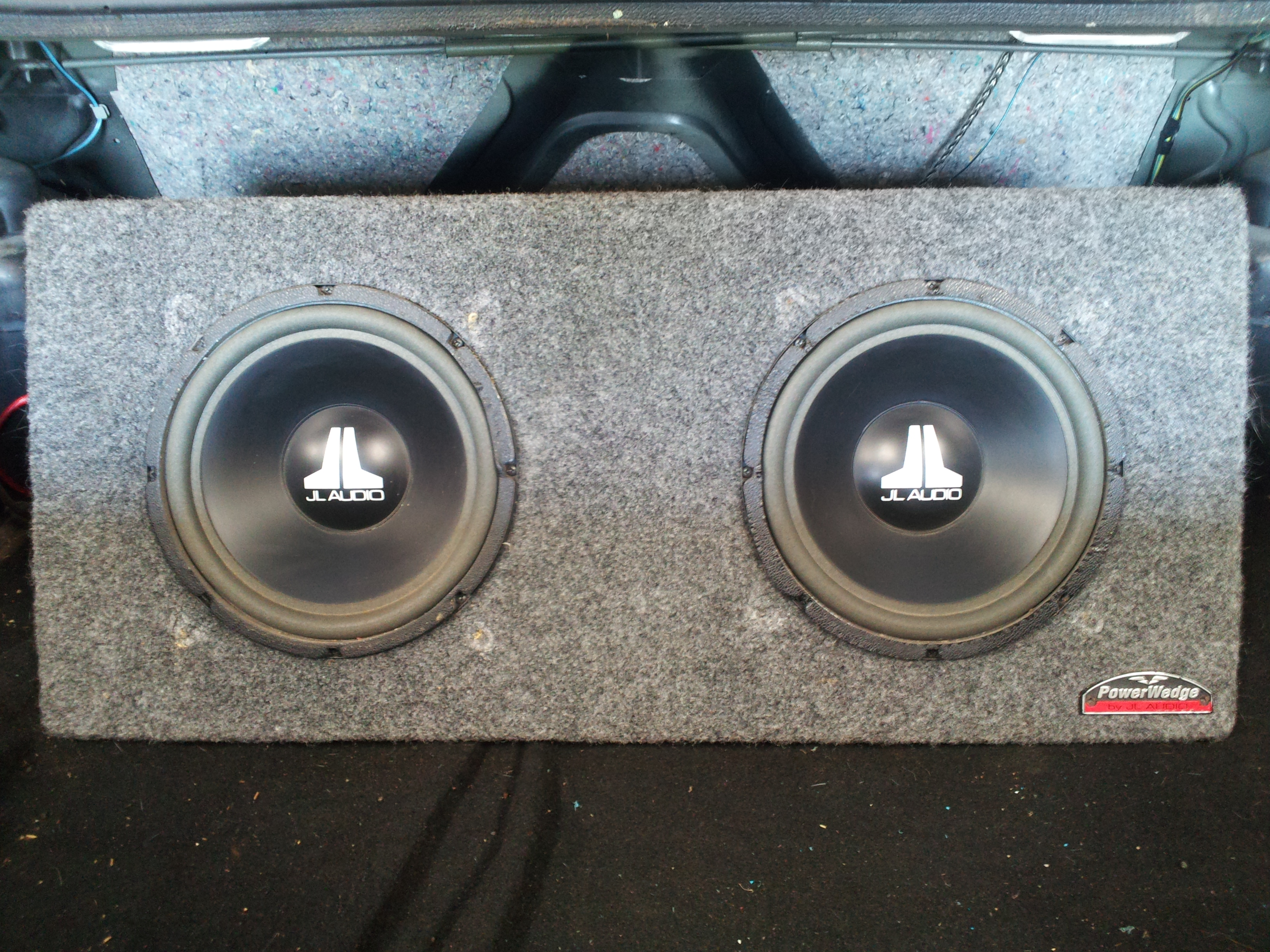
Two 10 inch JL Audio sub-woofers. Original "W0" series in JL Audio PowerWedge box

- PowerWedges: Compact, enclosed full-range speaker systems made by JL Audio in the early 1980s. One of the first enclosed speaker systems ever in the car audio market.
- 8W2: Eight-inch woofer for use in the new line of JL Audio PowerWedges. Following that design, subsequent 10- and 12-inch speaker systems were also released which were as well received as the 8-inch.
- The W3 Series: These subwoofers come in five different sizes ranging from the 6-inch to the 18-inch. Each component subwoofer has the option of being 2-ohm, 4-ohm, or 8-ohm. The W3 series showcases the DMA optimized motor system and an elevated frame cooling.
- The W5 Series: Higher-powered speakers that were received incredibly well when released in 1987.
- The W6 Series: Made for higher sound quality.
- W7: JL's top-of-the-line subwoofer featuring six now expired, patented technologies. Available in 8-inch, 10-inch, 12-inch, and 13.5-inch woofer sizes.
- TW5: JL's only shallow mount subwoofer and only available in 13.5-inch. The mounting depth is a mere 2.54 inches. This subwoofer features 3-ohm nominal impedance and has an RMS of 600 W. Easily mounts in tight places.
- CleanSweep: JL Audio's high-quality DSP-based solution that permits almost any factory-installed audio system to serve as the source for a high-performance aftermarket sound system.
