= X95 =

X95 may refer to:

- IWI X95, an Israeli bullpup assault rifle
- Diego Jiménez Torres Airport in Fajardo, Puerto Rico (FAA LID: X95)
- Jetour X95, a mid-size crossover SUV
