= Jetour X90 =

Mid-size crossover SUV

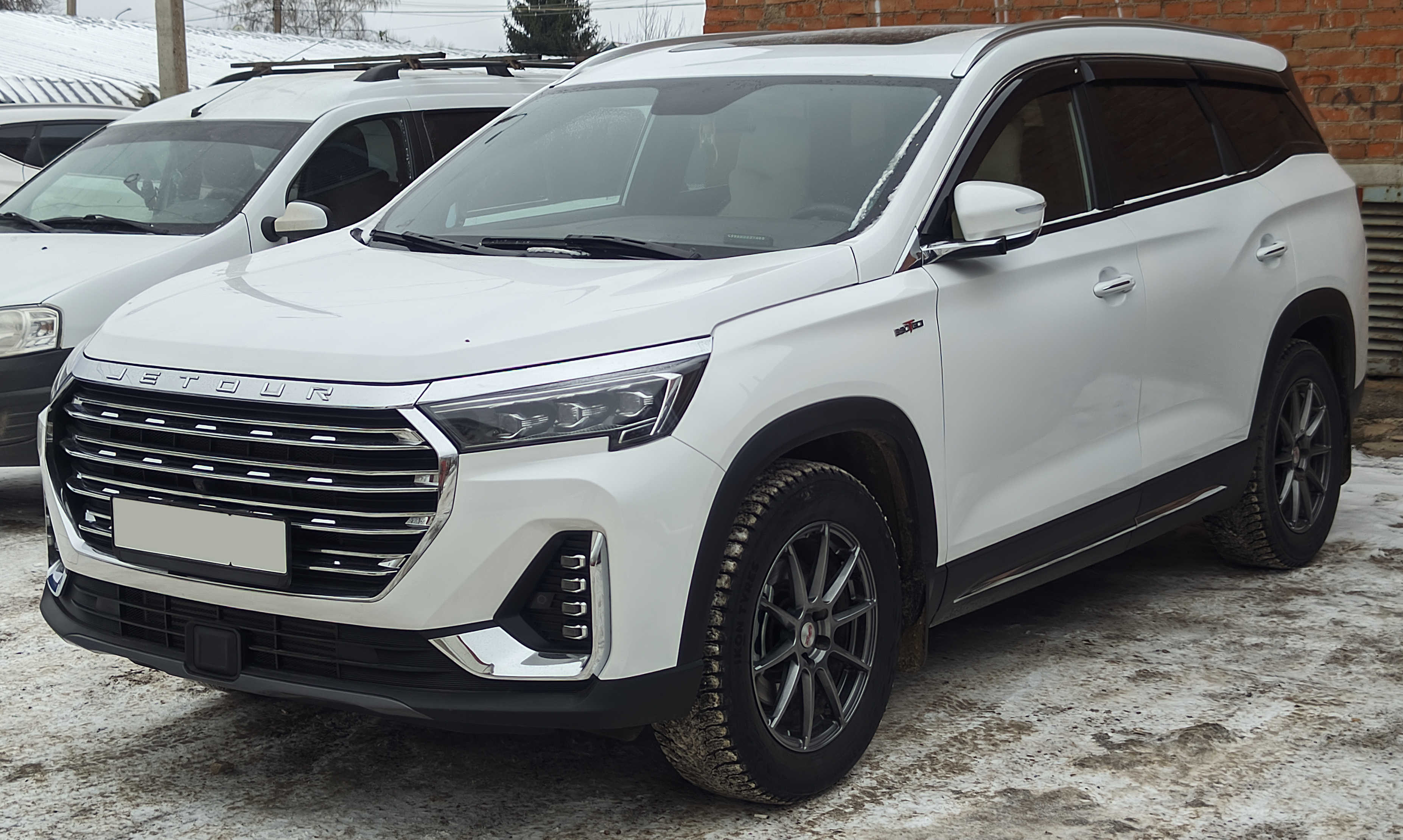
- 2024 Jetour X90 Plus

Overview
- Manufacturer: Jetour
- Production: 2019–present

Body and chassis
- Class: Mid-size crossover SUV
- Body style: 5-door SUV

The Jetour X90 is a mid-size crossover SUV produced by Jetour, a brand launched in 2018 by Chery under the Jetour brand (division of Chery Commercial Vehicle).

== First generation (2019) ==
First generation
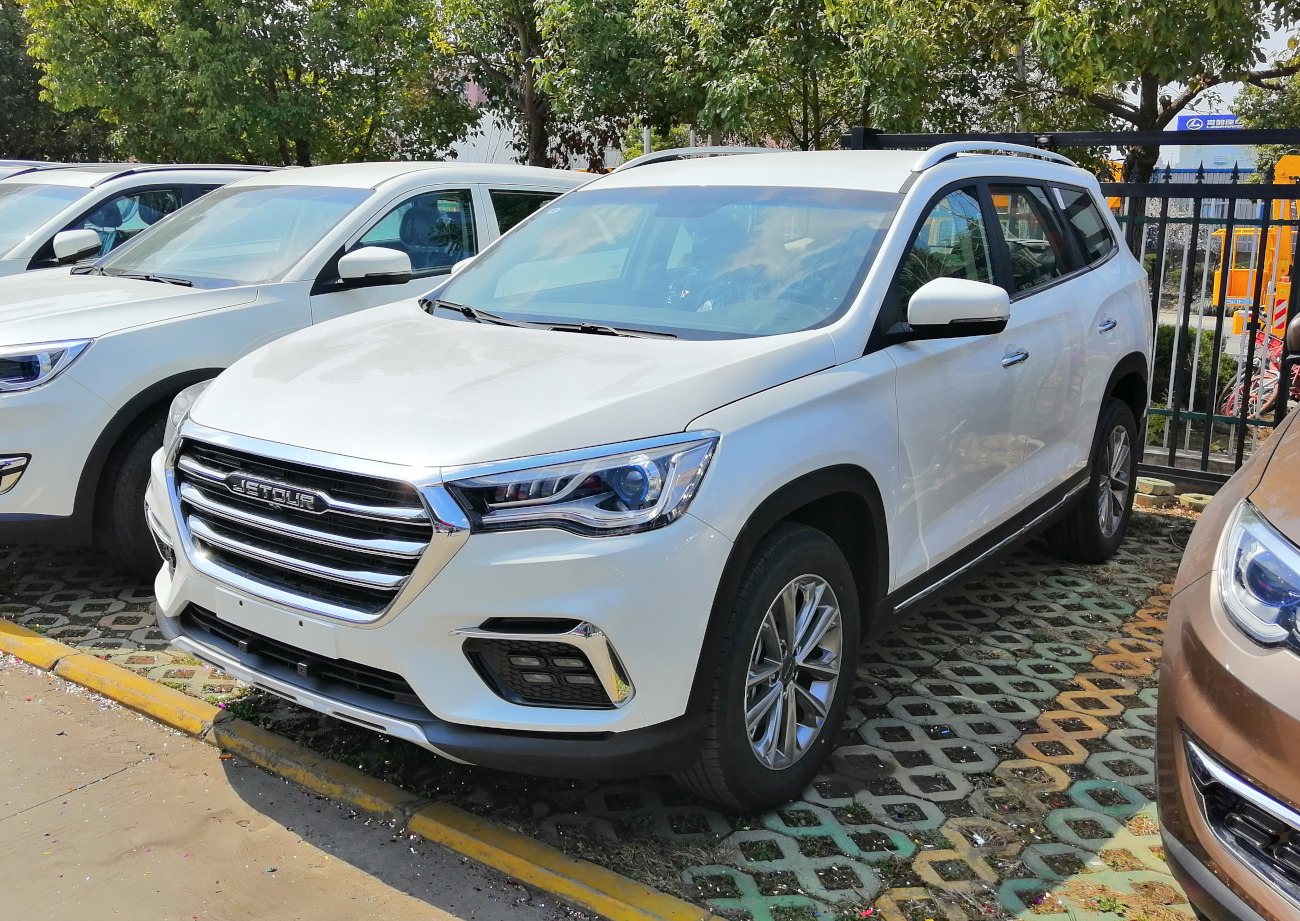
- Jetour X90

Overview
- Also called: Jetour Shanhai L9 (PHEV); Soueast S09
- Production: 2019–present
- Assembly: China: Wuhu, Anhui

Body and chassis
- Class: Mid-size crossover SUV
- Body style: 5-door SUV
- Layout: Front-engine, front-wheel-drive
- Platform: Chery P6X
- Related: Jetour X95

Powertrain
- Engine: Petrol: 1.5 L SQRE4T15 turbo I4; 1.6 L SQRF4J16 turbo I4; 2.0 L SQRF4J20 turbo I4; Petrol plug-in hybrid: 1.5 L SQRH4J15 turbo I4
- Electric motor: Permanent magnet synchronous (Shanhai L9)
- Transmission: 6-speed manual; 6-speed dual-clutch; 7-speed dual-clutch; 2-speed DHT
- Hybrid drivetrain: Plug-in hybrid (Shanhai L9)
- Battery: 19.43 kWh LFP (Shanhai L9)
- Electric range: 55 km (34 mi) (? kWh, CLTC); 84 km (52 mi) (19.43 kWh, WLTP)

Dimensions
- Wheelbase: 2,850 mm (112.2 in)
- Length: 4,840 mm (190.6 in) (Petrol pre-facelift); 4,858 mm (191.3 in) (Petrol facelift); 4,862 mm (191.4 in) (Hybrid)
- Width: 1,925 mm (75.8 in)
- Height: 1,718–1,780 mm (67.6–70.1 in) (Petrol); 1,784 mm (70.2 in) (Hybrid)
- Curb weight: 1,580–1,742 kg (3,483–3,840 lb) (Petrol); 1,870–1,922 kg (4,123–4,237 lb) (Hybrid)

The Jetour brand was officially released in January 2018, and the Jetour X90 is the third model of the brand. It was officially launched in January 2019, and at launch, the X90 was powered by a 1.5 liter Turbo engine.

The interior is equipped with a 9-inch central control display and a 12.3-inch LCD instrument that are standard for all trim levels, and the high-trim models are also equipped with front side airbags, front and rear head air curtains, panoramic sunroof, main driving 6-way and co-pilot 4-way electric adjustable leather seats, GPS navigation, car networking, electric heated mirrors, and independent air conditioners in the rear.

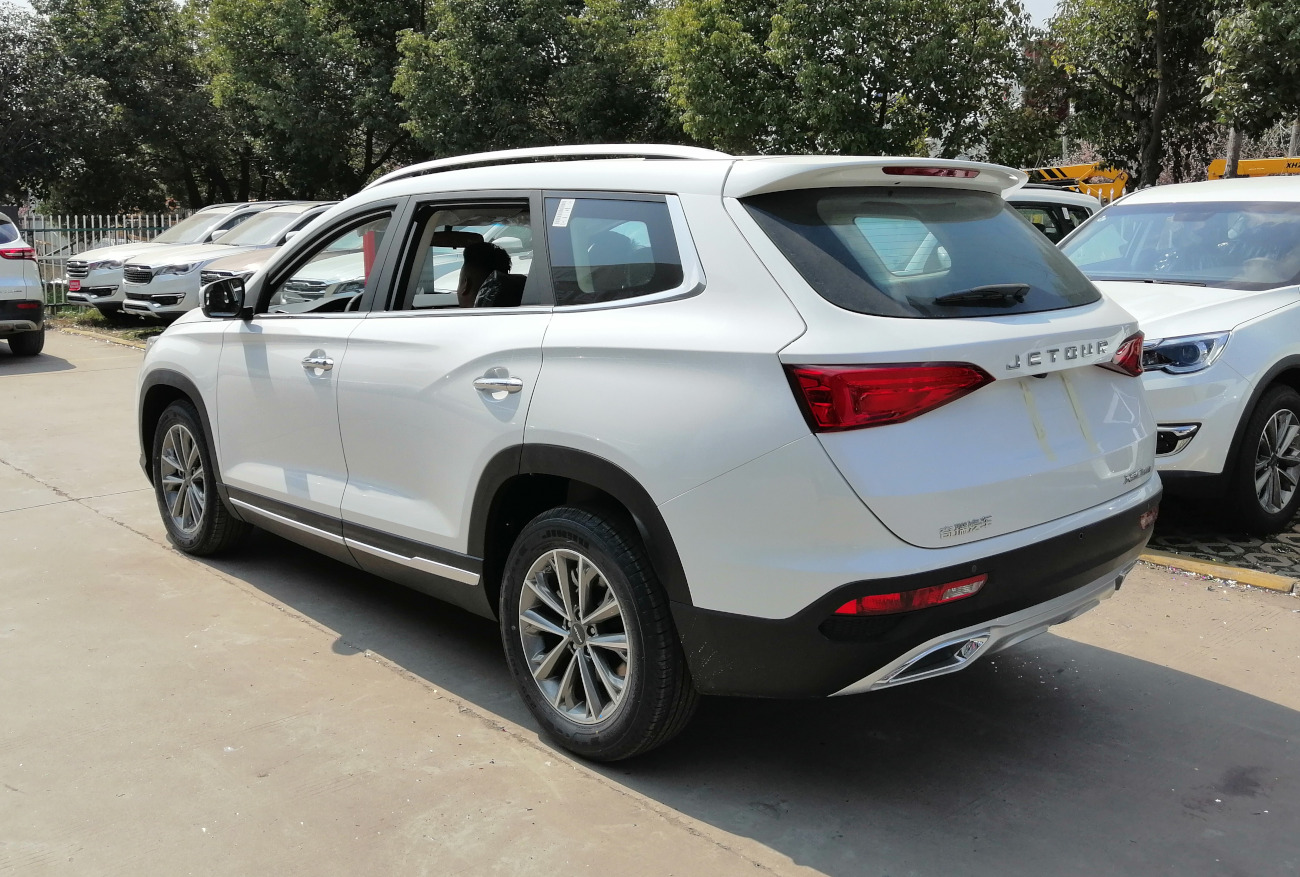
Rear view

MY2020 facelift (2020 to 2022 styling)

=== Powertrain ===
The Jetour X90 is powered by a 1.5 liter turbo inline-four petrol engine at launch, producing 156 hp and 230 N·m, with transmission options including a 6-speed manual transmission or a 6-speed Dual-clutch transmission.

On September 25, 2019, the Jetour X90 1.6 liter turbo engine model was launched. The 1.6 liter turbo variant is available in a total of 4 trims. The price ranges from 109,900 to 140,900 yuan (~US$15,429 – US$19,781). The 1.6 liter turbo engine is an ACTECO in-cylinder direct injection engine codenamed F4J16 by Chery, with a maximum power of 197 ps.

=== Jetour X90 Plus ===
A more premium facelift for the 2021 model year was launched during the 2021 Shanghai Auto Show called the X90 Plus. The X90 Plus features large screens for both the dashboards and the infotainment system. The middle of the console sits an airplane-style stick, rotary knob, and a touchpad control. The interior also features a platform for wireless charging, connectivity to various applications and 5G internet connection.

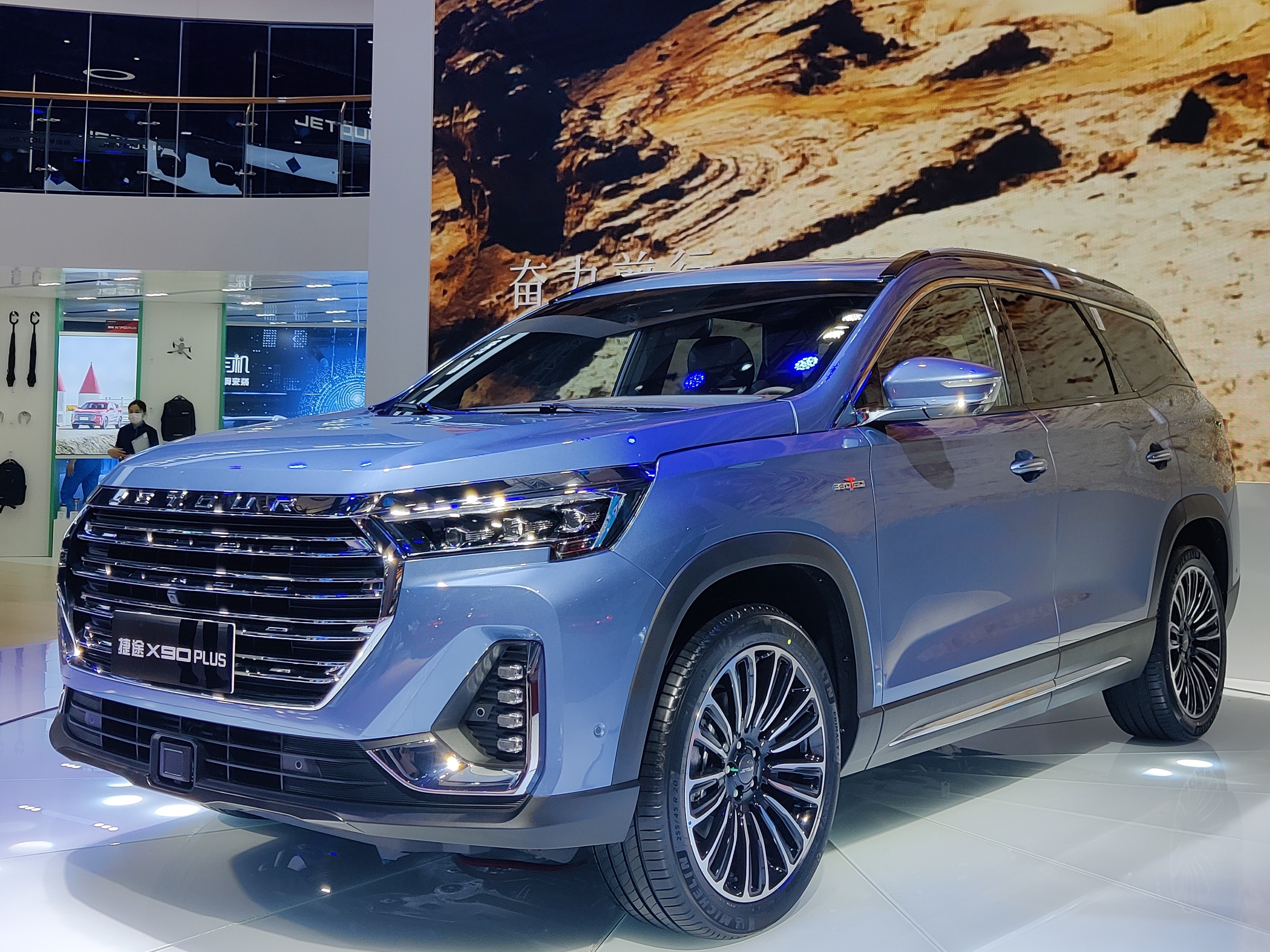
Jetour X90 Plus (front)

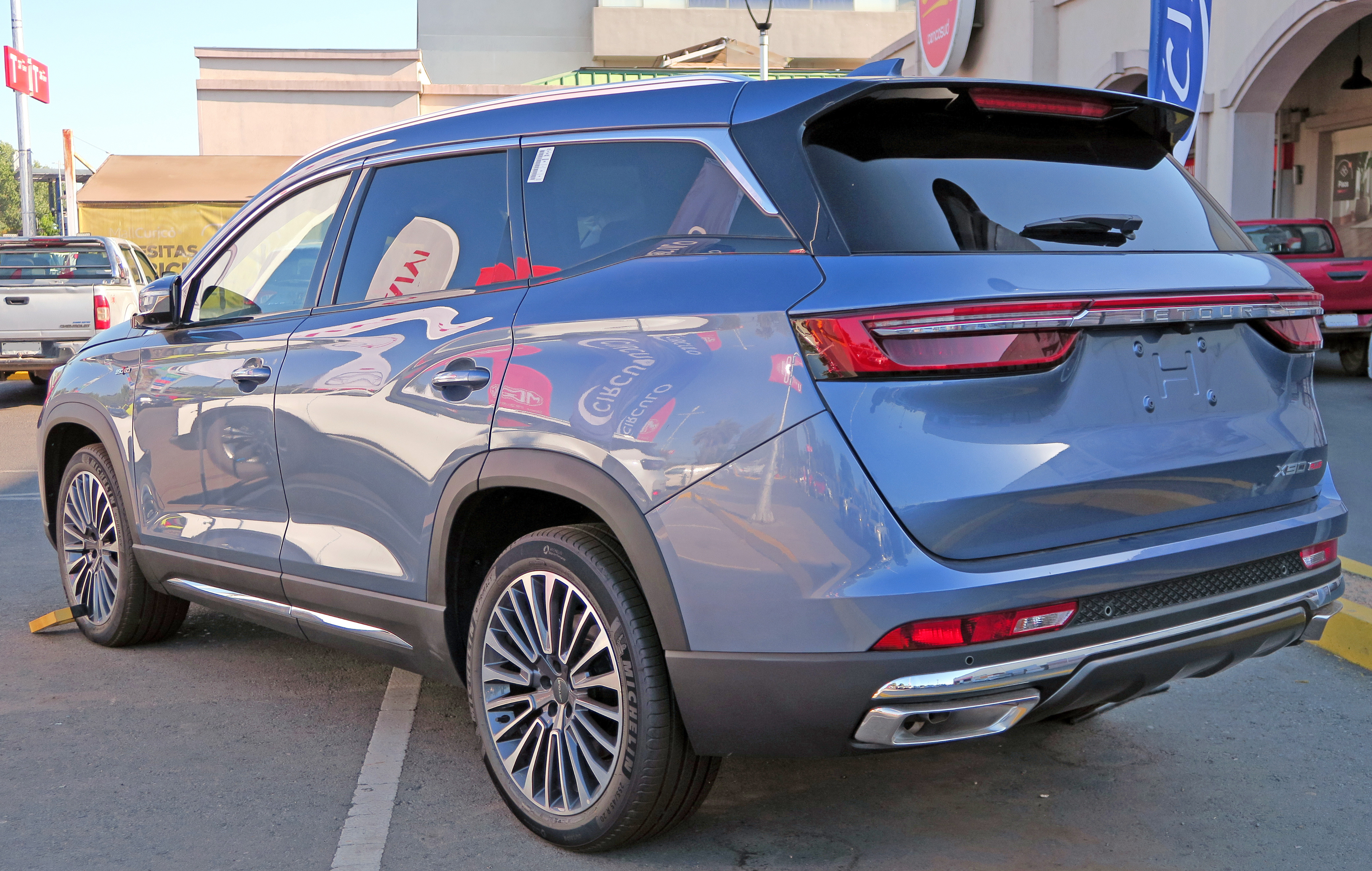
Jetour X90 Plus (rear)

=== Jetour X90 Pro ===
A even more premium variant of the X90 was launched in March 2024 called the X90 Pro. The X90 Plus features a 15.6 inch large screen in the center console, and is available as either a 5-seater or a 7-seater. Powertrains include a 1.6 liter turbo engine developing 197 hp and 290N·m and a 2.0 liter TGDI engine developing 254 hp and 390N·m. Both engines are mated to a 7-speed DCT gearbox.

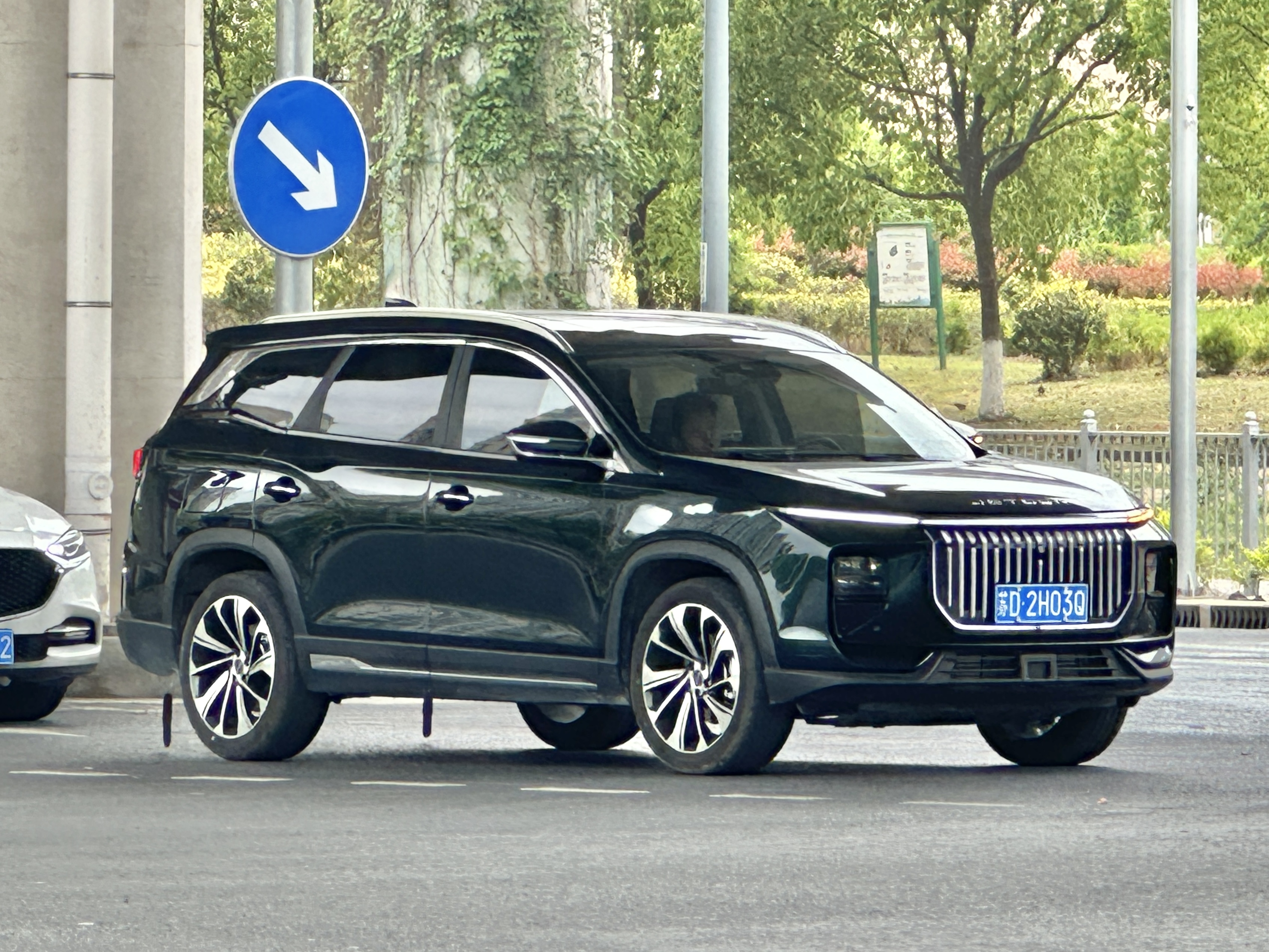
Jetour X90 Pro (front)

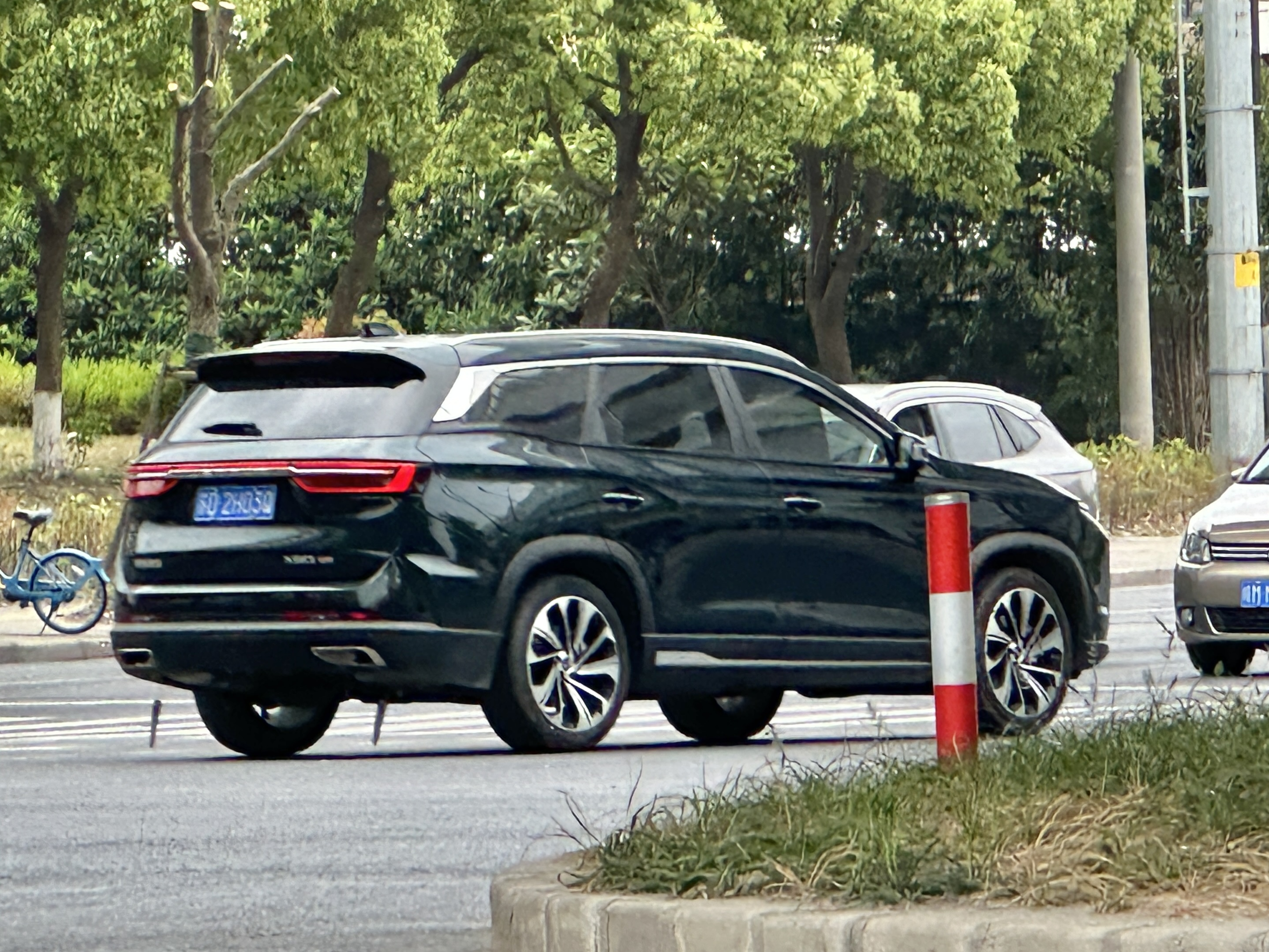
Jetour X90 Pro (rear)

=== Jetour Shanhai L9 ===
The Jetour Shanhai L9 (山海L9, literally: Mountain sea L9) is the plug-in hybrid version of the X90 Pro. Shanhai would be the name of a series of upcoming hybrid Jetour vehicles, and the Shanhai L9 is the first of the series. The Shanhai L9 is powered by a hybrid powertrain consisting a 1.5-liter Turbo engine producing a maximum output of 115 kW.

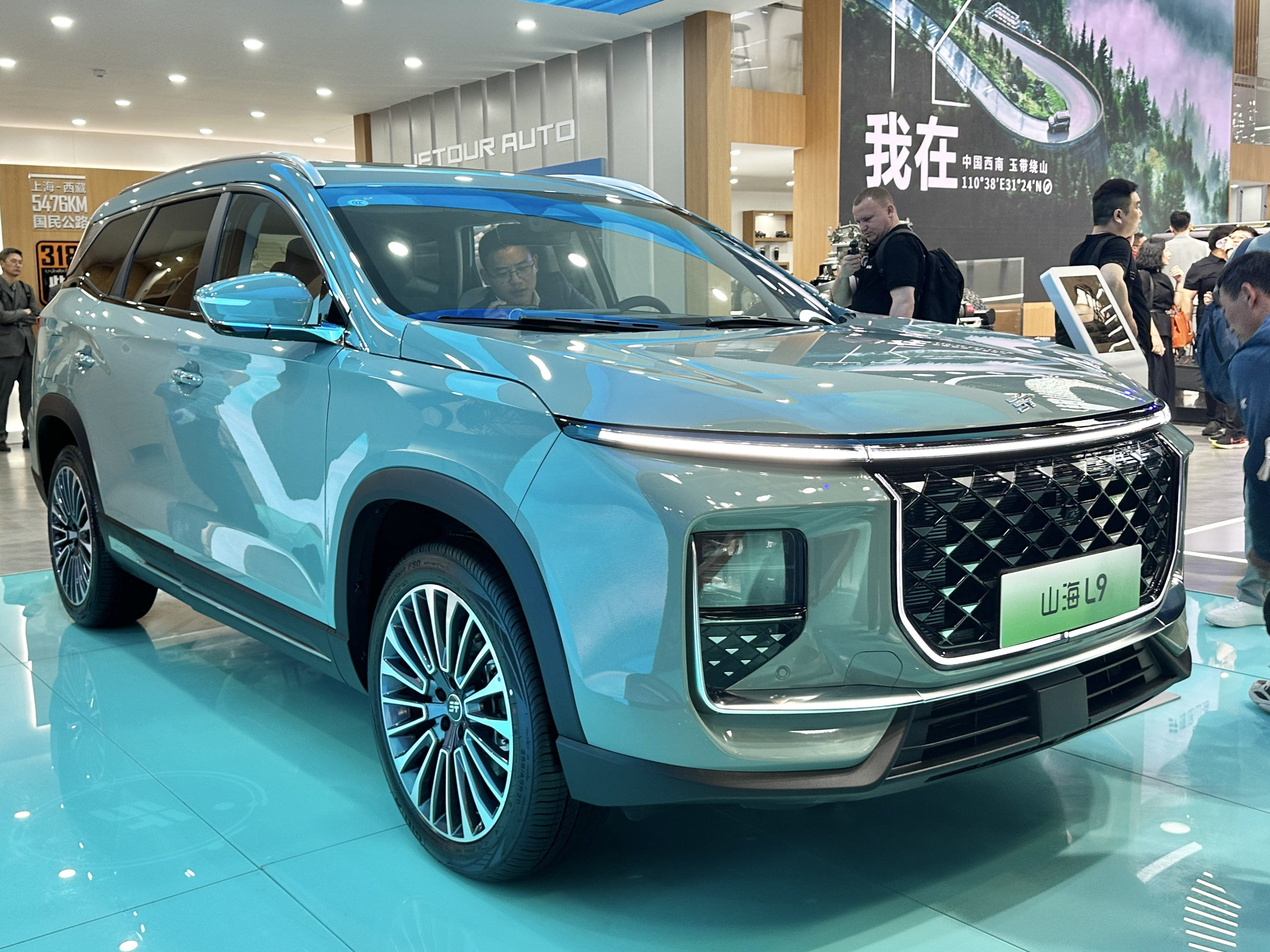
Jetour Shanhai L9 (front)

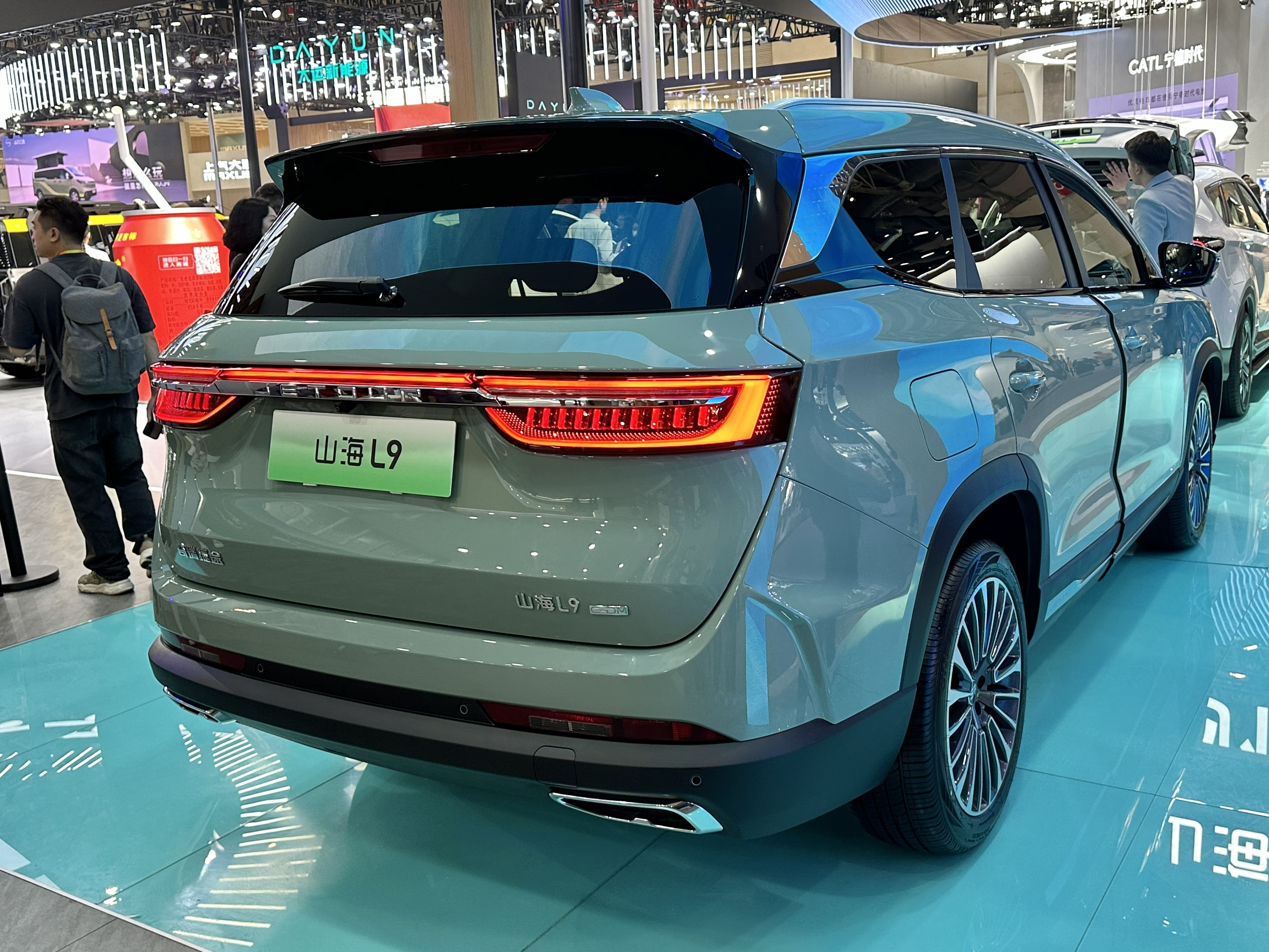
Jetour Shanhai L9 (rear)
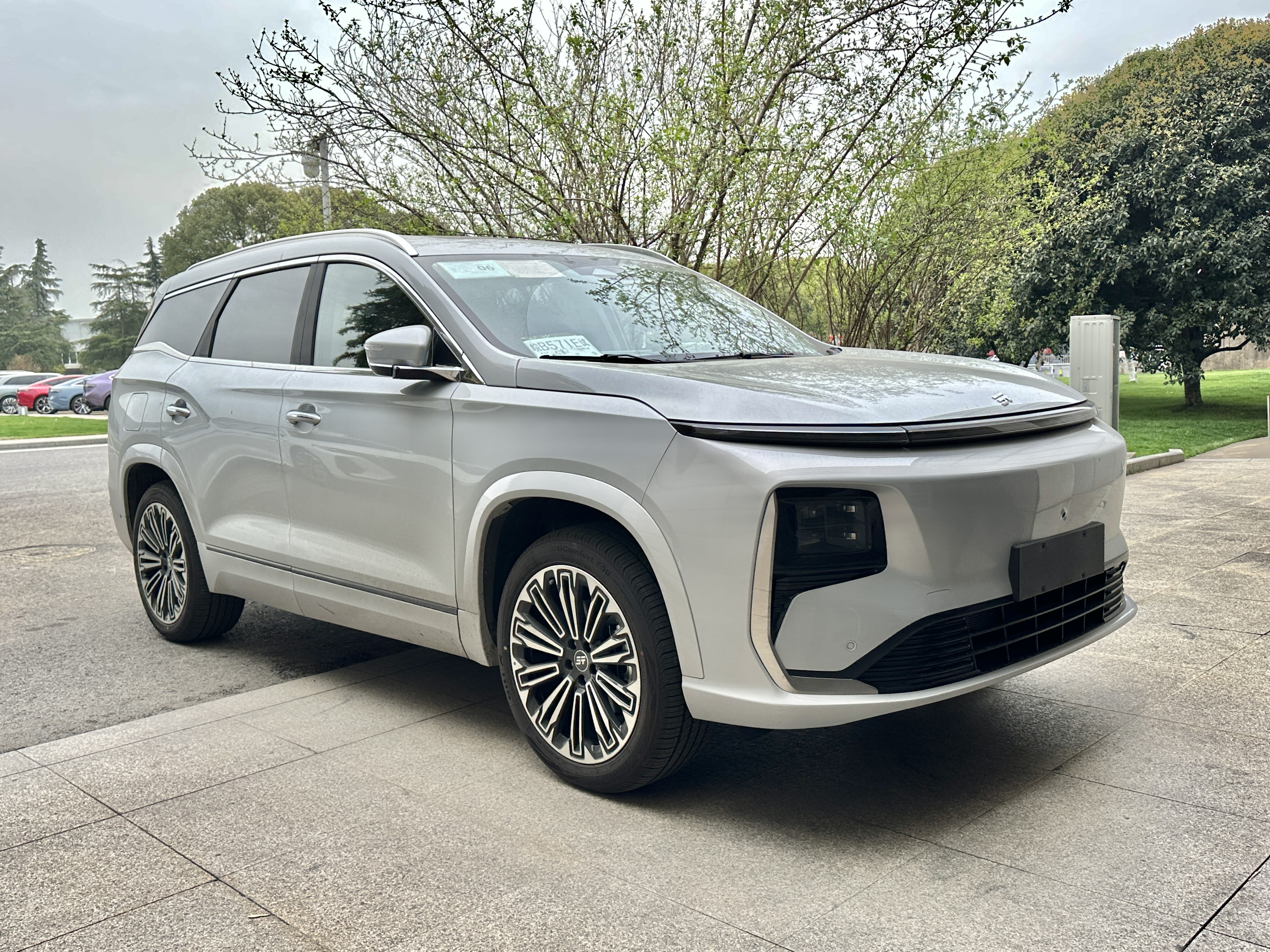
Jetour Shanhai L9 C-DM (front)

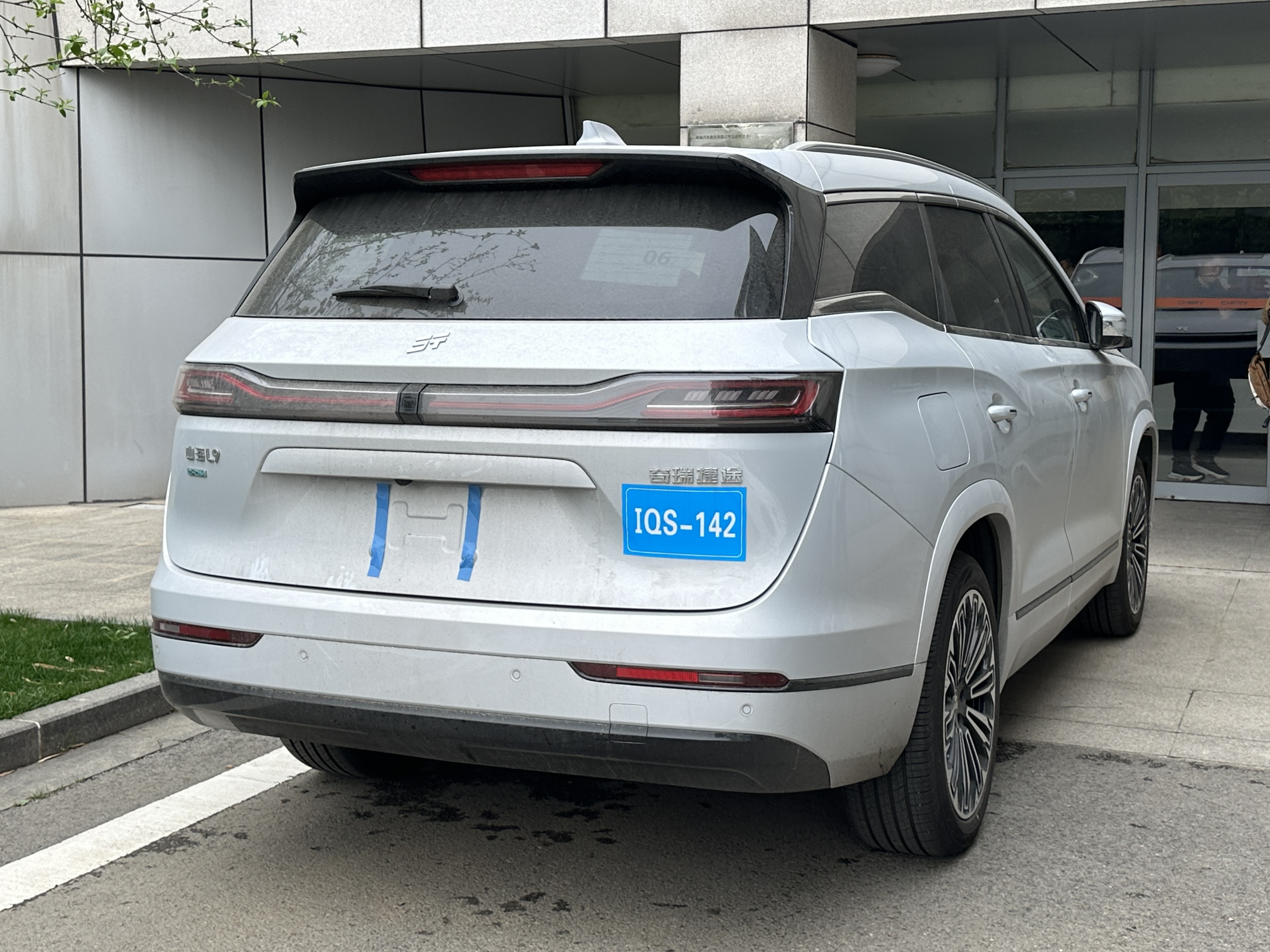
Jetour Shanhai L9 C-DM (rear)

== Second generation (2026) ==
Second generation

Overview
- Production: 2026–present
- Assembly: China: Fuzhou, Fujian

Body and chassis
- Class: Mid-size crossover SUV
- Body style: 5-door SUV
- Layout: Front-engine, front-wheel-drive
- Related: Jetour X70L

Powertrain
- Engine: Petrol: 1.5 L turbo I4; 2.0 L turbo I4
- Transmission: 8-speed automatic; 7-speed DCT

Dimensions
- Wheelbase: 2,820 mm (111.0 in)
- Length: 4,830 mm (190.2 in)
- Width: 1,930 mm (76.0 in)
- Height: 1,705 mm (67.1 in)
- Curb weight: 1,750–1,805 kg (3,858–3,979 lb)

The second generation Jetour X90 was unveiled in China with the MIIT released photos published on 9 June 2026. Being essentially a rebadged variant of the internal combustion engine powered Jetour X70L, dimensions are similar with the restyled front bumper featuring a prominent grille as a continuation of the design of the first generation model. The engine options are a 2.0 liter turbo engine developing 187kW and a 1.5 liter turbo engine developing 135kW.

== Sales ==
Year	China		
Year	X90	X90 Plus	Shanhai L9
2023	1,157	24,014	405
2024	6,254	30,508	11,023
2025	19,218	—	6,274

== See also ==
- Proton X90
