= Jetour X95 =

Mid-size crossover SUV

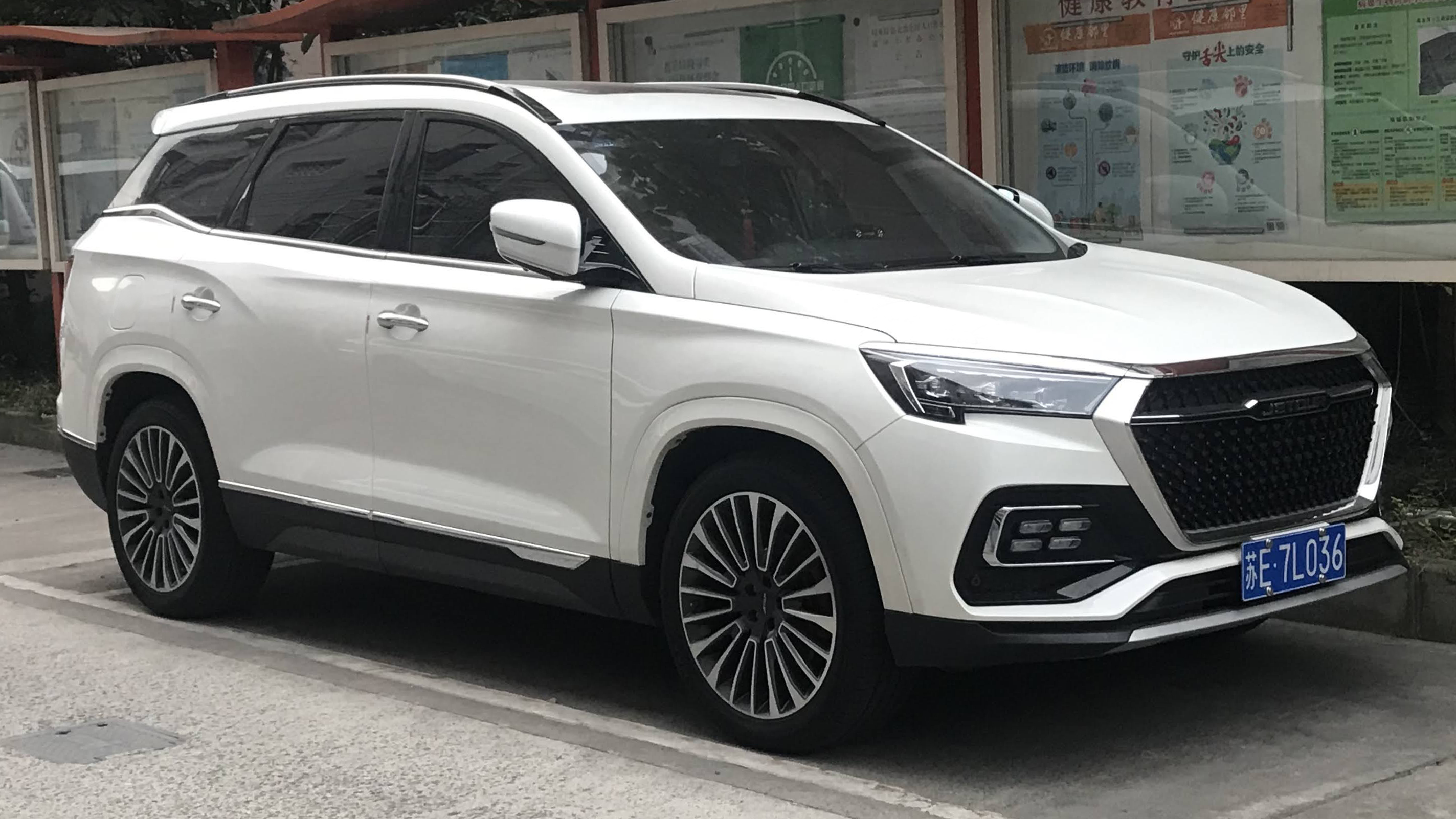

Overview
- Manufacturer: Jetour (Chery)
- Production: 2019–2024
- Assembly: China: Wuhu, Anhui

Body and chassis
- Class: Mid-size crossover SUV
- Body style: 5-door SUV
- Layout: Front-engine, front-wheel-drive
- Platform: Chery P6X
- Related: Jetour X90

Powertrain
- Engine: Petrol: 1.5 L SQRE4T15C turbo I4; 1.6 L SQRF4J16 turbo I4
- Transmission: 6-speed manual; 6-speed dual-clutch; 7-speed dual-clutch

Dimensions
- Wheelbase: 2,855 mm (112.4 in)
- Length: 4,840 mm (190.6 in); 4,858 mm (191.3 in); 4,875 mm (191.9 in)
- Width: 1,925 mm (75.8 in)
- Height: 1,780 mm (70.1 in)
- Curb weight: 1,630–1,685 kg (3,594–3,715 lb)

The Jetour X95 is a mid-size crossover SUV produced by Chery under the Jetour brand (division of Chery Commercial Vehicle).

== Overview ==
The X95 was presented at the Auto Shanghai in April 2019. The up to seven-seater vehicle has been sold in China since November 2019.

Chery Tiggo 7, Chery Tiggo 8 and Jetour X90 use the same technology.

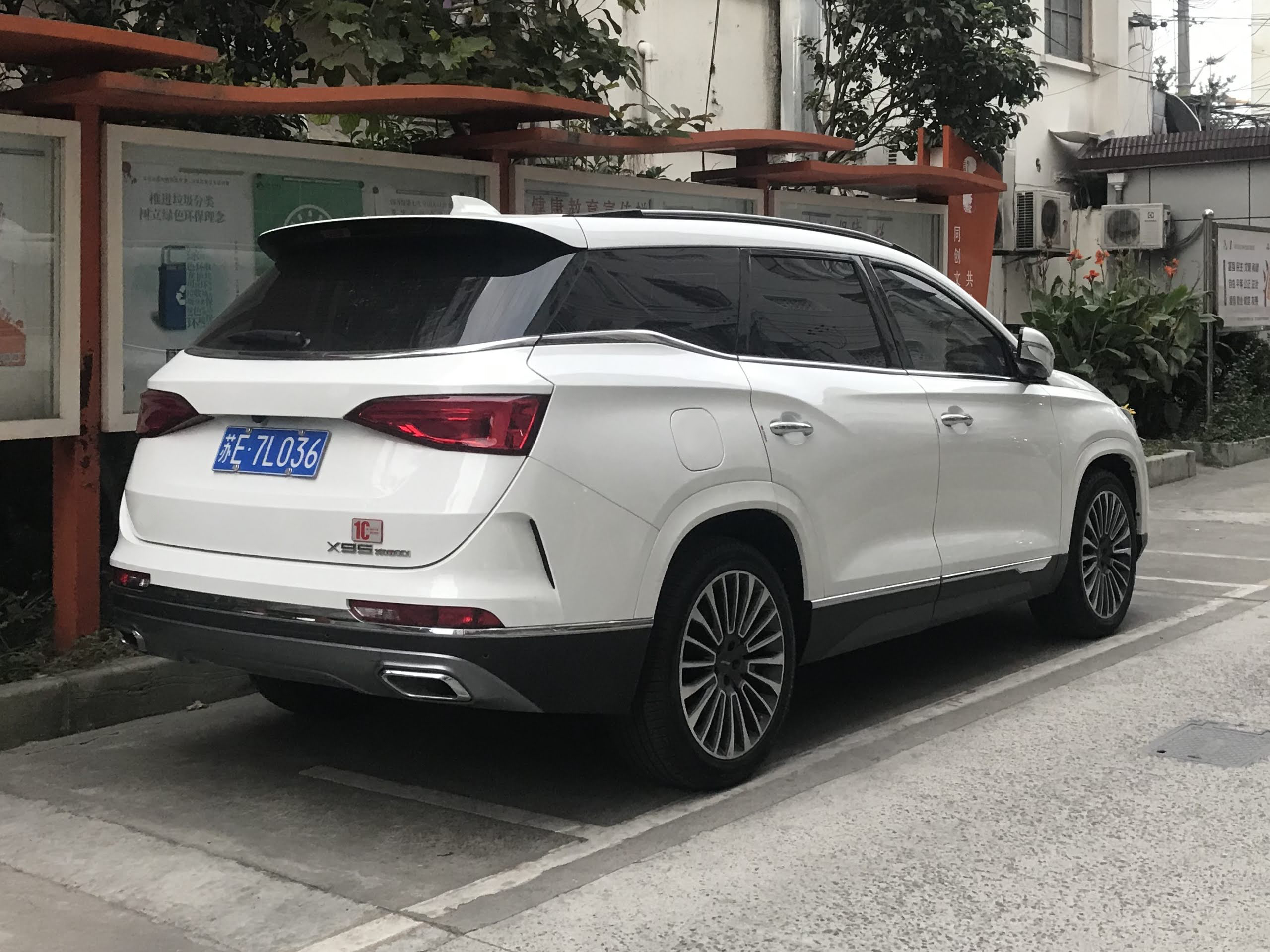
Rear view

== Powertrain ==
The SUV is powered by a turbocharged 1.5-liter petrol engine with an output of 115 kW (156 hp) or a turbocharged 1.6-liter petrol engine with an output of 145 kW (197 hp). These engines are used in other Chery Automobile SUV models.

Specs
Model	Years	Transmission	Power	Torque	Top speed
Petrol
1.5 L Turbo	2019–2020	6-speed manual 6-speed DCT	115 kW (156 PS; 154 hp) at 5,500 rpm	230 N⋅m (170 lb⋅ft; 23 kg⋅m) at 1,750–4,000 rpm	180 km/h (112 mph)
1.6 L Turbo	2019–2024	7-speed DCT	145 kW (197 PS; 194 hp) at 5,500 rpm	290 N⋅m (214 lb⋅ft; 30 kg⋅m) at 2,000–4,000 rpm	185 km/h (115 mph)
