= List of sport utility vehicles =

This page lists sport utility vehicles currently in production (as of 2026) as well as past models. The list includes crossover SUVs, Mini SUVs, Compact SUVs and other similar vehicles. Also includes hybrid, luxury, sport or tuned, military, electric and fuel cell versions. Due to similarity, Sport Utility Trucks are also in this list.

Note: Many of the vehicles (both current and past) are related to other vehicles in the list. A vehicle listed as a 'past model' may still be in production in an updated form under a different name, it may be listed under that name in the 'currently in production' section. Also, some vehicles are sold under different marques in different geographical locations, therefore some vehicles may be listed more than once but usually link to the same page. Different states may also classify vehicles differently. What may be considered an SUV in one state, may not in another state. Example; The Chevrolet Trax is known as the Chevrolet Tracker in Russia and Brazil, and in Australia and New Zealand, it is marketed by GM Holden (Holden Trax). Some images provided below may be pictures of outdated models.

== Currently in production ==
Manufacturer	Model	Image	Class	Country of origin	Years produced	Countries available
Abarth	600e		electric subcompact crossover	Italy	2024–present	Europe
Abarth	Pulse		subcompact crossover	Italy	2022–present	South America
Abarth	Fastback		subcompact crossover coupe	Italy	2023–present	South America
Acura	ADX		luxury compact crossover	Japan	2025–present	United States, Canada, Mexico
Acura	MDX		luxury mid-size crossover	Japan	2001–present	United States, Canada, Mexico
Aeolus	Haohan		compact crossover	China	2023–present	China
Aeolus	L7		plug-in hybrid compact crossover	China	2023–present	China
Aeolus	Haoji		compact crossover	China	2022–present	China
Aeolus	L8		plug-in hybrid compact crossover	China	2025–present	China
Aeolus	L8Y		electric compact crossover	China	2026–present	China
Aeolus	Sky EV01		electric compact crossover	China	2023–present	China
Aeolus	Yixuan GS		compact crossover	China	2020–present	China
Aion	i60		electric and range extender compact crossover	China	2025–present	China
Aion	LX		electric luxury mid-size crossover	China	2019–present	China
Aion	N60		electric compact crossover	China	2026–present	China
Aion	V		electric compact crossover	China	2020–present	worldwide
Aion	Y		electric compact crossover	China	2021–present	China
Aion	Y Plus		electric compact crossover	China	2022–present	China
Aistaland	GX7		range extender mid-size crossover	China	2026–present	China
AITO	M5		electric and range extender luxury compact crossover	China	2022–present	China
AITO	M6		electric and range extender luxury mid-size crossover	China	2026–present	China
AITO	M7		electric and range extender luxury full-size crossover	China	2022–present	China
AITO	M8		electric and range extender luxury full-size crossover	China	2025–present	China
AITO	M9		electric and range extender luxury full-size crossover	China	2023–present	China
Alfa Romeo	Junior		subcompact crossover	Italy	2024–present	worldwide
Alfa Romeo	Stelvio		luxury compact crossover	Italy	2017–present	worldwide
Alfa Romeo	Tonale		compact crossover	Italy	2022–present	worldwide
Alpina	XB7		luxury full-size crossover	Germany	2020–present	Europe
Alpine	A390		electric compact crossover	France	2026–present	Europe
AM General	Humvee C-Series		luxury full-size crossover	United States	2013–present	United States, Canada
Arcfox	αT5		electric compact crossover	China	2024–present	China
Arcfox	αT6		electric mid-size crossover	China	2020–present	China
Arcfox	αT7		electric and range extender mid-size crossover	China	2026–present	China
Aston Martin	DBX707		full-size crossover	United Kingdom	2022–present	worldwide
Aston Martin	DBX S		full-size crossover	United Kingdom	2025–present	worldwide
AUDI	E7X		electric and range extender full-size crossover	China	2026–present	China
Audi	Q2L		luxury subcompact crossover	Germany	2018–present	China
Audi	Q3		luxury compact crossover	Germany	2011–present	worldwide
Audi	Q3 Sportback		luxury compact crossover coupe	Germany	2019–present	worldwide except North America
Audi	Q4 e-tron		electric luxury compact crossover	Germany	2021–present	Europe, North America and China
Audi	Q4 e-tron Sportback		electric luxury compact crossover coupe	Germany	2021–present	Europe, North America and China
Audi	Q5		luxury compact crossover	Germany	2008–present	worldwide
Audi	Q5 Sportback		luxury compact crossover coupe	Germany	2021–present	worldwide
Audi	Q5 e-tron		electric luxury mid-size crossover	Germany	2022–present	China
Audi	Q5L		luxury compact crossover	Germany	2018–present	China
Audi	Q6		luxury full-size crossover	Germany	2022–present	China
Audi	Q6 e-tron		electric luxury compact crossover	Germany	2023–present	Europe, North America, South America
Audi	Q6 e-tron Sportback		electric luxury compact crossover coupe	Germany	2024–present	Europe, North America and South America
Audi	Q6L e-tron		electric luxury compact crossover	Germany	2025–present	China
Audi	Q6L sportback e-tron		electric luxury compact crossover coupe	Germany	2025–present	China
Audi	Q7		luxury mid-size crossover	Germany	2005–present	worldwide
Audi	Q8		luxury mid-size SUV	Germany	2018–present	worldwide
Audi	RS Q3		luxury compact performance crossover	Germany	2015–present	worldwide except North America
Audi	RS Q3 Sportback		luxury compact performance crossover coupe	Germany	2020–present	worldwide except North America
Audi	RS Q8		luxury mid-size performance suv	Germany	2020–present	worldwide
Audi	SQ5		luxury compact performance crossover	Germany	2013–present	worldwide
Audi	SQ5 Sportback		luxury compact performance crossover coupe	Germany	2021–present	worldwide
Audi	SQ6 e-tron		electric luxury compact crossover	Germany	2024-present	worldwide
Audi	SQ6 sportback e-tron		electric luxury compact crossover coupe	Germany	2024-present	worldwide
Audi	SQ7		luxury mid-size performance crossover	Germany	2015–present	worldwide
Audi	SQ8		luxury mid-size performance SUV	Germany	2019–present	worldwide
Aurus	Komendant		luxury full-size SUV	Russia	2022–present	Russia
Avatr	07		electric and range extender mid-size crossover	China	2024–present	China
Avatr	07L		electric and range extender mid-size crossover	China	2026-present	China
Avatr	11		electric and range extender mid-size crossover	China	2023–present	China
Baojun	Yep		electric mini crossover	China	2023–present	China
Baojun	Yep Plus		electric compact crossover	China	2023–present	China
Baojun	Yunhai		electric and plug-in hybrid compact crossover	China	2024–present	China
BAW	212 T01		compact crossover	China	2024–present	China
Beijing	BJ30		compact crossover	China	2020–present	China
Beijing	BJ40		compact crossover	China	2014–present	China, South America
Beijing	BJ40L/Plus		compact crossover	China	2016–present	China
Beijing	BJ60		full-size	China	2022–present	China
Beijing	X3		subcompact crossover	China	2016–present	China
Beijing	X55		compact crossover	China	2022–present	China, Europe
Beijing	X75		mid-size crossover	China	2020–present	China
Beijing	Xingtan 5X		mid-size crossover	China	2026–present	China
BelGee	X50		subcompact crossover	Belarus	2023-present	Belarus, Russia
BelGee	X70		compact crossover	Belarus	2024-present	Belarus, Russia
Bentley	Bentayga		luxury mid-size crossover	United Kingdom	2015–present	worldwide
Bestune	T33		subcompact crossover	China	2019–present	Middle East
Bestune	T77		compact crossover	China	2018-present	Russia, Middle East
Bestune	T90		mid-size crossover	China	2023–present	China, Russia, Middle East
Bestune	Yueyi 03		electric compact crossover	China	2025–present	China
Bestune	Yueyi 07		plug-in hybrid mid-size crossover	China	2025–present	China
BMW	iX		electric luxury mid-size crossover	Germany	2021–present	worldwide
BMW	iX3		electric luxury compact crossover	Germany	2020–present	worldwide
BMW	X1/ iX1		luxury subcompact crossover	Germany	2009–present	worldwide
BMW	X2/ iX2		luxury subcompact crossover	Germany	2017–present	worldwide
BMW	X3		luxury compact crossover	Germany	2003–present	worldwide
BMW	X5 / iX5		luxury executive crossover	Germany	1999–present	worldwide
BMW	X6		luxury executive crossover	Germany	2008–present	worldwide
BMW	X7		luxury full-size crossover	Germany	2018–present	worldwide
BMW M	X5 M		sport luxury mid-size crossover	Germany	2010–present	worldwide
BMW M	X6 M		sport luxury mids-ize crossover	Germany	2009–present	worldwide
BMW M	XM		luxury full-size crossover	Germany	2023–present	
Buick	Electra E5		electric luxury mid-size crossover	United States	2023–present	China
Buick	Electra E7		plug-in hybrid mid-size crossover	United States	2026–present	China
Buick	Enclave		full-size crossover	United States	2007–present	United States, Canada, Mexico
Buick	Encore GX		subcompact crossover	United States	2020–present	United States, Canada
Buick	Envision / Envision S		luxury compact crossover	United States	2014–present	United States, Canada, China
Buick	Envision Plus		luxury mid-size crossover	United States	2021–present	China
Buick	Envista		luxury compact crossover	United States	2022–present	United States, Canada
BYD	Datang		electric full-size crossover	China	2026–present	China
BYD	Sealion 05 EV		electric and plug-in hybrid compact crossover	China	2024–present	China
BYD	Sealion 06		electric and plug-in hybrid mid-size crossover	China	2025–present	China
BYD	Sealion 7		electric mid-size crossover	China	2024–present	worldwide
BYD	Sealion 08		electric and plug-in hybrid full-size crossover	China	2026–present	China
BYD	Seal U / Sealion 6		plug-in hybrid and electric compact crossover	China	2020–present	worldwide
BYD	Song Pro / Sealion 5 DM-i		plug-in hybrid compact crossover	China	2019–present	worldwide
BYD	Song L EV		electric mid-size crossover	China	2023–present	China
BYD	Song L DM-i		plug-in hybrid mid-size crossover	China	2024–present	China
BYD	Song Ultra		electric and plug-in hybrid mid-size crossover	China	2026–present	China
BYD	Tang / Tan EV / Sealion 8		electric and plug-in hybrid mid-size crossover	China	2015–present	China
BYD	Tang L / Sealion 8 / Atto 8		electric and plug-in hybrid mid-size crossover	China	2025–present	China
BYD	Yuan Up/Pro / S1 Pro / Atto 2		electric and plug-in hybrid subcompact crossover	China	2024–present	worldwide
BYD	Yuan Plus / Atto 3		electric compact crossover	China	2021–present	worldwide
Cadillac	Escalade		luxury full-size	United States	1999–present	North America, Europe, Middle East, East Asia
Cadillac	Escalade ESV		luxury extended length	United States	2001–present	North America
Cadillac	Escalade IQ		electric luxury full-size	United States	2024–present	North America
Cadillac	Lyriq		electric luxury mid-size crossover	United States	2022–present	North America, Europe, Japan, China
Cadillac	Optiq		electric luxury compact crossover	United States	2024–present	North America, Europe, China
Cadillac	Vistiq		electric luxury mid-size crossover	United States	2025–present	North America, Europe, China
Cadillac	XT4		luxury compact-subcompact crossover	United States	2018–present	North America
Cadillac	XT5		luxury mid-size crossover	United States	2017–present	North America, China
Cadillac	XT6		luxury mid-size crossover	United States	2019–present	North America, China
Changan	CS35 Plus		subcompact crossover	China	2018–present	China
Changan	CS55 Plus		compact crossover	China	2019–present	China
Changan	CS75 Plus		mid-size crossover	China	2019–present	China
Changan	CS75 Pro		mid-size crossover	China	2025–present	China
Changan	X5		compact crossover	China	2020–present	China
Changan	X7		mid-size crossover	China	2019–present	China
Changan	UNI-K		mid-size crossover	China	2020–present	China
Changan	UNI-T		compact crossover	China	2020–present	China
Changan	UNI-Z		compact crossover	China	2021–present	China
Changan	Nevo E07		electric mid-size crossover	China	2024–present	China
Changan	Nevo Q05		battery electric compact crossover	China	2025–present	China
Changan	Nevo Q07		plug-in hybrid mid-size crossover	China	2025–present	China
Chery	eQ7		electric compact crossover	China	2023–present	China
Chery	Tiggo 3x / Tiggo 2		subcompact crossover	China	2016–present	China, South America
Chery	Tiggo 5x / Tiggo 4		subcompact crossover	China	2017–present	China, South America
Chery	Tiggo 5x High Energy / Tiggo 5 Sport		compact crossover	China	2025–present	China
Chery	Tiggo 7		compact crossover	China	2016–present	worldwide
Chery	Tiggo 7 High Energy		compact crossover	China	2024–present	China
Chery	Tiggo 7L		compact crossover	China	2026–present	China
Chery	Tiggo 8		mid-size crossover	China	2018–present	worldwide
Chery	Tiggo 9		mid-size crossover	China	2023–present	China
Chery	Tiggo 9X / Tiggo 9		mid-size crossover	China	2024–present	worldwide
Chery	Fulwin T8		plug-in hybrid mid-size crossover	China	2025–present	China
Chery	Fulwin T9		plug-in hybrid mid-size crossover	China	2024–present	China
Chery	Fulwin T9L		plug-in hybrid mid-size crossover	China	2026–present	China
Chery	Fulwin T10		plug-in hybrid mid-size crossover	China	2024–present	China
Chery	Fulwin T11		range extender full-size crossover	China	2025–present	China
Chery	Fulwin X3/X3 Plus/X3L		battery electric and range extender compact crossover	China	2025–present	China
Chevrolet	Blazer		mid-size crossover	United States	2019–present	Canada, United States, Mexico
Chevrolet	Blazer EV		electric mid-size crossover	United States	2023–present	United States
Chevrolet	Bolt		electric subcompact crossover SUV	United States	2026–present	United States
Chevrolet	Captiva		compact crossover	United States	2006–present	South Korea, Middle East, South East Asia, South Asia, Europe, South America
Chevrolet	Captiva PHEV/EV		electric and plug-in hybrid compact crossover	United States	2025–present	Latin America and Middle East
Chevrolet	Equinox		mid-size crossover (2004–2017) compact crossover (2017–present)	United States	2004–present	Canada, United States, Mexico
Chevrolet	Equinox EV		electric compact crossover	United States	2024–present	United States
Chevrolet	Groove		subcompact crossover	United States	2020–present	Latin America, Middle East
Chevrolet	Spark EUV		electric mini SUV	United States	2025–present	Latin America, Middle East
Chevrolet	Suburban		extended length/luxury extended length	United States	1933–present	United States, Canada, Mexico, Chile, Middle East, Philippines
Chevrolet	Tahoe		full-size/luxury full-size	United States	1995–present	United States, Canada, Mexico, Brazil, Middle East, Philippines, Russia
Chevrolet	Tracker (2019)		subcompact crossover	United States	2019–present	China, South America, Russia
Chevrolet	Trailblazer (SUV)		mid-size	United States	2001–present	South Africa, Brazil
Chevrolet	Trailblazer (Crossover)		subcompact crossover	United States	2020–present	United States, Canada
Chevrolet	Traverse		full-size crossover	United States	2009–present	United States, Canada, Mexico
Chevrolet	Trax/Seeker		compact crossover	United States	2013–present	worldwide, except Australia, New Zealand, and Equator
Citroën	Basalt		subcompact crossover coupe	France	2024–present	Latin America, Asia
Citroën	C3 Aircross		subcompact crossover	France	2010–present	South America, Europe
Citroën	C3 Aircross (CC24)		subcompact crossover	France	2023–present	Latin America, Asia
Citroën	C4		Compact crossover SUV	France	2020–present	Europe
Citroën	C5 Aircross		compact crossover	France	2017–present	China, Europe
Citroën	C5 X		mid-size crossover	France	2021–present	China, Europe, Japan
Conquest Vehicles	Knight XV		luxury full-size	Canada	2008–present	worldwide
Cupra	Formentor		compact crossover	Spain	2020–present	Europe
Cupra	Tavascan		electric compact crossover	Spain	2023–present	Europe
Cupra	Terramar		compact crossover	Spain	2024–present	Europe
Dacia	Duster		subcompact crossover	Romania	2010–present	Europe, Middle East, Northern Africa
Dacia	Bigster		compact crossover	Romania	2024–present	Europe
Dacia	Sandero Stepway		subcompact crossover	Romania	2003–present	Europe(except Russia), Middle East, Northern Africa
Daihatsu	Rocky		subcompact	Japan	2019–present	Japan, Indonesia
Daihatsu	Terios		compact	Japan	2006–present	Indonesia
Deepal	E07		electric and range extender mid-size crossover	China	2024–present	Thailand, Australia
Deepal	G318		plug-in hybrid mid-size crossover	China	2024–present	China
Deepal	S05		electric and range extender subcompact crossover	China	2024–present	China, Brunei, United Kingdom, Thailand, Pakistan, Australia
Deepal	S07		electric and range extender compact crossover	China	2023–present	China, Mexico, Thailand, Pakistan, Australia, Brunei, Indonesia, South Africa
Deepal	S09		plug-in hybrid full-size crossover	China	2025–present	China
Denza	B5		plug-in hybrid mid-size	China	2025–present	worldwide (except China)
Denza	B8		plug-in hybrid full-size	China	2025–present	worldwide (except China)
Denza	N8		electric and plug-in hybrid full-size crossover	China	2023–2024, 2026–present	China
Denza	N8L		electric and plug-in hybrid full-size crossover	China	2025–present	China
Denza	N9		plug-in hybrid full-size crossover	China	2025–present	China
Dodge	Durango		full-size (1998–2009) mid-size crossover (2011–present)	United States	1998–present	United States, Canada, Mexico
Dongfeng	Nammi 06		electric compact crossover	China	2025–present	China
Dongfeng	eπ 008		electric mid-size crossover	China	2024–present	China
Dongfeng	eπ M8		electric mid-size crossover	China	2026–present	China
DR	3.0		compact crossover	China	2018–present	Italy
DR	5.0		compact crossover	China	2020–present	Italy
DR	6.0		compact crossover	China	2023–present	Italy
DR	EVO 3		compact crossover	China	2020–present	Italy
DR	EVO 4		compact crossover	China	2020–present	Italy
DR	EVO 5		compact crossover	China	2020–present	Italy
DR	EVO 6		compact crossover	China	2021–present	Italy
DR	EVO 7		mid-size crossover	China	2023–present	Italy
DR	ICH-X K2		compact crossover	China	2023–present	Italy
DR	ICH-X K3		mid-size crossover	China	2024–present	Italy
DR	Sportequipe 6 GT		compact crossover	China	2024–present	Italy
DR	Sportequipe 7 GTW		mid-size crossover	China	2024–present	Italy
DS	3 Crossback		compact crossover	France	2018–present	Europe, Asia
DS	No. 7		compact crossover	France	2026–present	Europe
DS	No. 8		electric mid-size crossover	France	2025–present	Europe
Epicland	X9		range extender luxury full-size crossover	China	2026–present	China
Elaris	Beo		electric compact crossover	China	2021–present	Europe
Exeed	ET5		electric and range extender mid-size crossover	China	2025–present	China
Exeed	EX7		electric and range extender mid-size crossover	China	2026–present	China
Exeed	TX		mid-size crossover	China	2019–present	China, Russia
Exeed	Lanyue		mid-size crossover	China	2020–present	China, Russia
Exeed	Yaoguang		mid-size crossover	China	2022–present	China, Russia
Exeed	Exlantix ET		electric and range extender mid-size crossover	China	2024–present	China, Russia
Fangchengbao	Bao 5		plug-in hybrid mid-size crossover	China	2023–present	China
Fangchengbao	Bao 8		plug-in hybrid full-size crossover	China	2024–present	China
Fangchengbao	Tai 3		electric compact crossover	China	2025–present	China
Fangchengbao	Ti7		electric and plug-in hybrid mid-size crossover	China	2025–present	China
Fangchengbao	Ti9		plug-in hybrid full-size crossover	China	2026–present	China
Ferrari	Purosangue		mid-size crossover	Italy	2023–present	worldwide
Fengon	580		compact crossover	China	2016–present	China, Indonesia, South Korea, Pakistan, Russia, Bangladesh, Nepal, Hong Kong, Morocco
Fengon	580 Pro		compact crossover	China	2019–present	China, Pakistan
Fengon	S560		compact crossover	China	2017–present	China
Fengon	ix5		mid-size crossover	China	2018–present	China
Fiat	600		subcompact crossover	Italy	2023–present	Europe
Fiat	Fastback		subcompact crossover	Italy	2022–present	South America
Fiat	Pulse		subcompact crossover	Italy	2021–present	South America
Ford	Bronco		mid-size crossover	United States	1966–1996 2021–present	North America, Europe, China
Ford	Bronco Sport		compact crossover	United States	2020–present	North America, Europe
Ford	Bronco New Energy		electric and range extender mid-size crossover	United States	2025–present	China
Ford	Capri EV		electric compact crossover	United States	2024–present	Europe
Ford	Edge		mid-size crossover	United States	2006–present	China, Panama
Ford	Equator		mid-size crossover	United States	2021–present	China
Ford	Equator Sport/Territory		compact crossover	United States	2021–present	China, Asia, Africa, Middle East, South America
Ford	Everest		mid-size	United States	2003–present	Southeast Asia, Australia, Africa, Middle East
Ford	Expedition		full-size	United States	1997–present	United States, Canada, Mexico, Middle East, Philippines, South America (except Argentina and Brazil), South Korea
Ford	Expedition Max		extended length/luxury extended length	United States	2017–present	
Ford	Explorer		mid-size crossover	United States	1991–present	worldwide, except Australia and New Zealand
Ford	Explorer EV		electric compact crossover	United States	2024–present	Europe
Ford	Kuga		compact crossover	United States	2008–present	worldwide, except Australia and New Zealand; North America 2013–2025 as Escape
Ford	Mondeo Sport		mid-size crossover	United States	2021–present	China
Ford	Mustang Mach-E		electric compact crossover	United States	2020–present	worldwide
Ford	Puma		subcompact crossover	United States	2019–present	Europe, Australia
Ford	Puma Gen-E		electric subcompact crossover	United States	2024–present	Europe
Forthing	T5		compact crossover	China	2018–present	China
Forthing	T5 Evo		compact crossover	China	2020–present	China, Vietnam, Europe
Forthing	Leiting/Xinghai T5		electric compact crossover	China	2023–present	China, Europe
Foxtron	Bria		electric compact crossover	Taiwan	2025–present	Taiwan
Foxtron	Cavira		electric compact crossover	Taiwan	2026–present	Taiwan
Freelander	8		plug-in hybrid, electric and range extender full-size	China	2026–present	China, Middle East
Geely	Binyue / Coolray		subcompact crossover	China	2018–present	worldwide
Geely	Boyue / Cityray		compact crossover	China	2016–present	worldwide
Geely	Boyue L / Starray / Atlas		compact crossover	China	2022–present	worldwide
Geely	Boyue REV		range extender compact crossover coupe	China	2026–present	China
Geely	EX5 / E5		electric compact crossover	China	2025–present	worldwide (except China and Malaysia)
Geely	Haoyue / Okavango		mid-size crossover	China	2020–present	worldwide
Geely	Icon		subcompact crossover	China	2020–present	China
Geely	Starray/EX5/E5 EM-i		plug-in hybrid compact crossover	China	2025–present	worldwide (except China and Malaysia)
Geely	Xingyue S / Tugella		compact crossover	China	2019–present	worldwide
Geely	Xingyue L / Monjaro		mid-size crossover	China	2021–present	worldwide
Geely	Yuanjing X3 / GX3 Pro		compact crossover	China	2017–present	worldwide
Geely Galaxy	E5		electric compact crossover	China	2024–present	China
Geely Galaxy	M7		plug-in hybrid compact crossover	China	2026–present	China
Geely Galaxy	M9		plug-in hybrid full-size crossover	China	2025–present	China
Geely Galaxy	Starship 7		plug-in hybrid and battery electric compact crossover	China	2024–present	China
Geely Geometry	M6		electric compact crossover	China	2022–present	China
Geely Geometry	E		electric subcompact crossover	China	2022–present	China
Genesis	GV60		electric luxury compact crossover	South Korea	2020–present	
Genesis	GV70		Compact luxury crossover	South Korea	2020–present	
Genesis	Electrified GV70		electric compact luxury crossover	South Korea	2022–present	
Genesis	GV80		mid-size luxury crossover	South Korea	2020–present	
Genesis	GV80 Coupe		mid-size luxury crossover coupe	South Korea	2023–present	
GMC	Acadia		full-size crossover (2006–2016, 2023–present) mid-size crossover (2017–2023)	United States	2006–present	United States, Canada, Mexico, Middle East
GMC	Hummer EV SUV		electric full-size	United States	2021–present	United States
GMC	Terrain		mid-size crossover (2010–2017) compact crossover (2018–present)	United States	2010–present	United States, Canada, Mexico, Middle East
GMC	Yukon		full-size	United States	1992–present	United States, Canada, Mexico, Middle East
GMC	Yukon Denali		luxury full-size	United States	1999–present	United States, Canada, Mexico, Middle East
GMC	Yukon XL		extended length full-size	United States	1960–present	United States, Canada, Mexico, Middle East
Haima	8S		compact crossover	China	2019–present	China
Haval	Big Dog/Dargo/H7		compact crossover	China	2020–present	China, Russia
Haval	Chitu / Jolion Pro/Hybrid		compact crossover	China	2021–present	China, Russia
Haval	Cool Dog / H3		compact crossover	China	2022–present	China, Russia
Haval	H5 (2nd)		full-size crossover	China	2023–present	China
Haval	H6		compact crossover	China	2011–present	China, Russia, Australia
Haval	H6L		mid-size crossover	China	2025–present	China
Haval	H6S / H6 Coupe		compact crossover	China	2021–present	China
Haval	H9		full-size crossover	China	2014–present	Australia, China, New Zealand
Haval	H10		full-size	China	2026–present	China
Haval	Jolion		compact crossover	China	2020–present	China, Russia, Thailand
Haval	M6		compact crossover	China	2017–present	China, Russia, Australia
Haval	Raptor		compact crossover	China	2023–present	China
Haval	Shenshou / F7		compact crossover	China	2021–present	China, Russia
Haval	Xiaolong Max		plug-in hybrid mid-size crossover	China	2023–present	China
Honda	Avancier		mid-size crossover	Japan	2016–present	China
Honda	BR-V		subcompact crossover	Japan	2015–present	Southeast Asia, Mexico
Honda	Breeze		compact crossover/luxury compact crossover	Japan	2019–present	China
Honda	CR-V		compact crossover/luxury compact crossover	Japan	1995–present	worldwide
Honda	CR-V e:FCEV		fuel cell powered crossover	Japan	2024–present	Japan and North America
Honda	Elevate/WR-V		subcompact crossover	Japan	2023–present	Japan, India and South America
Honda	e:N1		electric compact crossover	Japan	2023–present	Thailand
Honda	e:NS2/e:N2/Insight		electric compact crossover	Japan	2024–present	China, Japan and Thailand
Honda	HR-V/Vezel		subcompact crossover	Japan	1998–2006; 2013–present	North America, Europe, Australia, Thailand, Indonesia, Malaysia, Taiwan, and Brazil
Honda	Jazz Crosstar		subcompact crossover	Japan	2020–present	Europe
Honda	Passport		mid-size crossover	Japan	2018–present	North America
Honda	Pilot		mid-size crossover	Japan	2002–present	North America, Middle East, Russia, Ukraine, Philippines
Honda	Prologue		electric mid-size crossover	Japan	2024–present	North America
Honda	P7		electric mid-size crossover	Japan	2025–present	China
Honda	S7		electric mid-size crossover	Japan	2025–present	China
Honda	UR-V		mid-size crossover	Japan	2017–present	China
Honda	WR-V		subcompact crossover	Japan	2017–present	Southeast Asian, South America
Honda	XR-V		subcompact crossover	Japan	2014–present	China
Honda	ZR-V/HR-V		subcompact crossover	Japan	2023–present	Japan, China, Europe, North America
Hongqi	G919		range extended full-size	China	2026–present	China
Hongqi	HS3		subcompact luxury crossover	China	2023–present	China
Hongqi	HS5		luxury compact crossover	China	2019–present	China
Hongqi	HS6		plug-in hybrid luxury mid-size crossover	China	2025–present	China
Hongqi	HS7		luxury executive crossover	China	2019–present	China
Hongqi	E-HS9		electric luxury full-size crossover	China	2020–present	China, Europe
Hongqi	Guoyao/LS7		luxury full-size crossover	China	2022–present	China
Hongqi	Tiangong 06		electric luxury compact crossover	China	2025–present	China
Hongqi	Tiangong 08/EHS7		electric luxury mid-size crossover	China	2024–present	China, Europe
Huajing	S		plug-in hybrid full-size crossover	China	2026–present	China
Hyptec	HT		electric mid-size crossover	China	2023–present	China, Europe
Hyptec	HL		electric full-size crossover	China	2025–present	China, Europe
Hyptec	S600		electric and range extender mid-size crossover	China	2026–present	China
Hyundai	Alcazar		subcompact crossover	South Korea/India	2021–present	India
Hyundai	Bayon		Subcompact crossover	South Korea/Turkey	2021–present	Europe
Hyundai	Casper		Subcompact crossover	South Korea	2021–present	South Korea
Hyundai	Casper Electric / Inster		electric Subcompact crossover	South Korea	2024–present	worldwide
Hyundai	Creta/Cantus		subcompact	South Korea	2014–present	Asia, except Japan
Hyundai	Creta Electric		electric subcompact	South Korea	2025–present	India
Hyundai	Elexio/EO		electric compact crossover	South Korea	2025–present	China, Australia
Hyundai	Exter		subcompact crossover	South Korea	2023–present	India
Hyundai	Ioniq 5		electric compact crossover	South Korea	2021–present	Worldwide, except North Korea
Hyundai	Ioniq 9		electric mid-size crossover	South Korea	2025–present	Worldwide, except North Korea
Hyundai	Kona		subcompact crossover	South Korea	2017–present	Worldwide, except Japan and India
Hyundai	Kona Electric		electric subcompact crossover	South Korea	2018–present	Worldwide, except India
Hyundai	Mufasa		compact crossover	South Korea	2023–present	China, Taiwan
Hyundai	Nexo		fuel cell powered crossover	South Korea	2018–present	Worldwide, except North Korea
Hyundai	Santa Fe		compact crossover (2000–2006), mid-size crossover (2007–present)	South Korea	2000–present	Worldwide, except Japan
Hyundai	Palisade		mid-size crossover	South Korea	2019–present	Worldwide, except Japan and Europe
Hyundai	Tucson		compact crossover	South Korea	2004–present	Worldwide, except Japan and India
Hyundai	Venue		subcompact crossover suv	South Korea	2019–present	South Korea, except Japan
iCar	V23		electric compact crossover	China	2024–present	China
iCar	V27		range extender mid-size crossover	China	2026–present	China
IKCO	Reera		compact crossover	Iran	2024–present	Iran
IM	LS6		electric and range extender compact crossover	China	2023–present	China
IM	LS7		electric mid-size crossover	China	2022–present	China
IM	LS8		range extender full-size	China	2026–present	China
IM	LS9		range extender full-size	China	2025–present	China
Ineos	Grenadier		mid-size	United Kingdom	2022–present	worldwide
Infiniti	QX60		luxury mid-size crossover	Japan	2013–present	United States, Canada, Mexico, Middle East, China, Russia
Infiniti	QX65		luxury mid-size crossover coupe	Japan	2026–present	United States, Canada, Mexico
Infiniti	QX80		luxury full-size	Japan	2013–present	United States, Canada, Mexico, Middle East, China, Russia
Isuzu	MU-X		mid-size crossover	Japan	2013–present	South East Asia, China, India
JAC	QX PHEV		compact crossover	China	2023–present	China
JAC	X8 Plus		mid-size crossover	China	2023–present	China
Jaecoo	J5/5		subcompact crossover	China	2025–present	
Jaecoo	J5 EV/5 EV/E5		electric subcompact crossover	China	2025–present	
Jaecoo	J6/6 EV/EJ6		electric compact crossover	China	2024–present	Philippines, Thailand
Jaecoo	J7/7		compact crossover	China	2023–present	
Jaecoo	J8/8		mid-size crossover	China	2023–present	
Jeep	Avenger		compact crossover	United States	2023–present	Europe
Jeep	Renegade		subcompact crossover	United States	2014–present	worldwide
Jeep	Compass		compact crossover	United States	2006–present	worldwide
Jeep	Commander/Meridian		mid-size crossover	United States	2021–present	South America, India
Jeep	Cherokee (KM)		compact crossover	United States	2025–present	worldwide
Jeep	Grand Cherokee		mid-size crossover/luxury mid-size crossover	United States	1992–present	worldwide
Jeep	Recon		electric mid-size crossover	United States	2026–present	North America
Jeep	Wrangler/ Wrangler 2 door		compact	United States	1987–present	worldwide
Jeep	Wrangler Unlimited/Wrangler 4 door		mid-size	United States	2007–present	worldwide
Jeep	Wagoneer		full-size crossover	United States	2021–present	North America
Jeep	Wagoneer S		electric mid-size crossover	United States	2024–present	North America
Jetour	Dashing		compact crossover	China	2022–present	China
Jetour	Freedom/T1		compact crossover	China	2024–present	China, Philippines, South Africa, Saudi Arabia and UAE
Jetour	Traveller/Traveller 7/T2		mid-size crossover	China	2023–present	China, Indonesia, South Africa, Saudi Arabia and UAE
Jetour	Traveller C-DM		plug-in hybrid mid-size crossover	China	2024–present	China
Jetour	Shanhai T1		plug-in hybrid compact crossover	China	2024–present	China
Jetour	Shanhai L7		plug-in hybrid mid-size crossover	China	2024–present	China
Jetour	Shanhai L7 Plus		plug-in hybrid mid-size crossover	China	2025–present	China
Jetour	X70		mid-size crossover	China	2018–present	China
Jetour	X70 Plus		mid-size crossover	China	2020–present	China
Jetour	X70L		mid-size crossover	China	2025–present	China
Jetour	X90		mid-size crossover	China	2019–present	China
Jetour	Zongheng G700		plug-in hybrid full-size luxury	China	2025–present	China
Jetta	VS5		compact crossover	China	2019–present	China
Jetta	VS7		mid-size crossover	China	2019–present	China
Jetta	VS8		mid-size crossover	China	2025–present	China
Kaiyi	Kunlun / X7		compact crossover	China	2022–present	China
Kaiyi	Showjet / X3		subcompact crossover	China	2020–present	China
Kia	EV2		electric subcompact crossover	South Korea	2026–present	Europe
Kia	EV3		electric subcompact crossover	South Korea	2024–present	worldwide, except Japan and North Korea
Kia	EV5		electric compact crossover	South Korea	2023–present	worldwide, except Japan and North Korea
Kia	EV6		electric compact crossover	South Korea	2021–present	worldwide, except Japan and North Korea
Kia	EV9		electric mid-size crossover	South Korea	2023–present	worldwide, except Japan and North Korea
Kia	Niro		compact hybrid crossover	South Korea	2016–present	Worldwide, except Japan and North Korea
Kia	Seltos		subcompact crossover	South Korea	2019–present	Worldwide, except Japan and North Korea
Kia	Sonet		subcompact crossover	South Korea	2020–present	India, China
Kia	Syros		subcompact crossover	South Korea	2025–present	India
Kia	Sorento		mid-size(2002–2009), mid-size crossover(2010–present)	South Korea	2002–present	worldwide, except Japan and North Korea
Kia	Sportage		compact crossover	South Korea	1993–present	worldwide, except Japan and North Korea
Kia	Sportage (China)		compact crossover	China	2005–present	China
Kia	Stonic		subcompact crossover	South Korea	2017–present	worldwide, except Japan and North Korea
Kia	Telluride		mid-size crossover	South Korea	2019–present	United States, Canada, Mexico, Middle East
Kia	XCeed		compact crossover	South Korea	2019–present	Russia, Europe
KGM	Korando		subcompact(1996–2005), compact crossover/luxury compact crossover(2010–present)	South Korea	1996–present	worldwide, except South America
KGM	Rexton		luxury mid-size crossover	South Korea	2001–present	worldwide, except North America
KGM	Tivoli		luxury subcompact crossover	South Korea	2015–present	worldwide, except North America
KGM	Tivoli XLV		luxury subcompact extended crossover	South Korea	2016–present	worldwide, except North America
KGM	Actyon		luxury mid-size extended crossover	South Korea	2024–present	South Korea
KGM	Torres		luxury mid-size extended crossover	South Korea	2022–present	worldwide
Lada	Niva		subcompact crossover	Russia	1977–present	Russia, Europe, Central Asia
Lada	Niva Travel		subcompact crossover	Russia	2020–present	Russia
Lamborghini	Urus		luxury full-size	Italy	2018–present	worldwide
Lancia	Gamma		compact crossover	Italy	2026–present	Europe
Land Rover	Defender (L663)		compact/mid-size/full-size	United Kingdom	2019–present	worldwide
Land Rover	Discovery		luxury mid-size crossover	United Kingdom	1989–present	worldwide
Land Rover	Discovery Sport		luxury sport compact crossover	United Kingdom	2015–present	worldwide
Land Rover	Range Rover		luxury full-size	United Kingdom	1970–present	worldwide
Land Rover	Range Rover Evoque		luxury compact crossover	United Kingdom	2011–present	worldwide
Land Rover	Range Rover Sport		luxury sport mid-size	United Kingdom	2005–present	worldwide
Land Rover	Range Rover Velar		luxury mid-size crossover	United Kingdom	2017–present	worldwide
Leapmotor	A10 / B03X		electric subcompact crossover	China	2026–present	China, Europe
Leapmotor	B10		electric compact crossover	China	2025–present	China, Europe, Malaysia, Thailand
Leapmotor	C10		electric and range extender mid-size crossover	China	2023–present	China, Europe
Leapmotor	C11		electric and range extender mid-size crossover	China	2021–present	China
Leapmotor	C16		electric and range extender full-size crossover	China	2024–present	China
Leapmotor	D19		electric and range extender full-size	China	2026–present	China
Lepas	L4		compact crossover	China	2026–present	worldwide (except China)
Lepas	L8		mid-size crossover	China	2025–present	worldwide (except China)
Lexus	GX		luxury mid-size	Japan	2002–present	worldwide
Lexus	LX		luxury full-size	Japan	1995–present	worldwide
Lexus	LBX		subcompact crossover	Japan	2023–present	worldwide
Lexus	NX		luxury compact crossover	Japan	2014–present	worldwide
Lexus	RX		luxury compact crossover(1998–2003), luxury mid-size crossover(2004–present)	Japan	1998–present	worldwide
Lexus	RZ		electric luxury mid-size crossover	Japan	2023–present	worldwide
Lexus	TX		luxury full-size crossover	Japan	2023–present	North America
Lexus	UX		subcompact crossover	Japan	2018–present	worldwide
Li Auto	i6		electric luxury mid-size crossover	China	2025–present	China
Li Auto	i8		electric luxury full-size crossover	China	2025–present	China
Li Auto	i9		electric luxury full-size crossover	China	2026–present	China
Li Auto	L6		range extender luxury mid-size crossover	China	2024–present	China
Li Auto	L8		range extender luxury mid-size crossover	China	2022–present	China
Li Auto	L9		range extender luxury full-size crossover	China	2022–present	China, Middle East
Lincoln	Aviator		mid-size luxury crossover	United States	2002–2005, 2019–present	North America, China
Lincoln	Corsair		luxury compact crossover	United States	2020–present	North America, China
Lincoln	Nautilus		luxury mid-size crossover	United States	2019–present	North America, China
Lincoln	Navigator		luxury full-size	United States	1997–present	United States, Canada, Mexico, Middle East
Lincoln	Navigator L		luxury extended length	United States	2007–present	United States, Canada, Mexico, Middle East
Livan	7		electric compact crossover	China	2023–present	China
Livan	9		electric mid-size crossover	China	2022–present	China
Lotus	Eletre / For Me		electric and plug-in hybrid luxury mid-size crossover	United Kingdom	2023–present	worldwide
Lucid	Gravity		electric luxury mid-size crossover	United States	2024–present	United States
Luxgen	URX		mid-size crossover	Taiwan	2019–present	Taiwan
Luxgen	n7		electric compact crossover	Taiwan	2023–present	Taiwan
Luxeed	R7		electric luxury mid-size crossover coupe	China	2024–present	China
Lynk & Co	01		compact crossover	China	2017–present	China, Europe
Lynk & Co	05		compact coupe crossover	China	2019–present	China
Lynk & Co	06		subcompact crossover	China	2020–present	China
Lynk & Co	08		mid-size crossover	China	2023–present	China, Europe
Lynk & Co	09		mid-size crossover	China	2021–present	China
Lynk & Co	900		plug-in hybrid full-size crossover	China	2025–present	China
Lynk & Co	Z20/02		electric compact crossover	China	2024–present	China, Europe
M-Hero	917		electric full-size	China	2023–present	China
M-Hero	M817		plug-in hybrid full-size	China	2025–present	China
M-Hero	X700		plug-in hybrid mid-size	China	2026–present	China
Mahindra & Mahindra	BE 6		electric compact crossover	India	2024–present	India
Mahindra & Mahindra	Bolero		compact	India	2000–present	India, Sri Lanka
Mahindra & Mahindra	Scorpio		mid-size crossover	India	2002–present	India, Sri Lanka, Middle East, Europe, South America, Africa
Mahindra & Mahindra	Scorpio-N		compact crossover	India	2022–present	India, Middle East, South America, Africa
Mahindra & Mahindra	Thar		subcompact	India	2010–present	India, Sri Lanka
Mahindra & Mahindra	XEV 9e		electric mid-size crossover coupe	India	2025–present	India
Mahindra & Mahindra	XEV 9S		electric mid-size crossover	India	2025–present	India
Mahindra & Mahindra	XUV 3XO		subcompact crossover	India	2024–present	India
Mahindra & Mahindra	XUV 7XO		mid-size crossover	India	2026–present	India
Maserati	Grecale		luxury compact crossover	Italy	2022–present	worldwide
Maxus	D90		mid-size	China	2017–present	China
Mazda	CX-3		subcompact crossover	Japan	2014–present	worldwide
Mazda	CX-30		subcompact crossover	Japan	2019–present	worldwide
Mazda	CX-5		compact crossover	Japan	2012–present	worldwide
Mazda	CX-50		compact crossover	Japan	2022–present	North America, China
Mazda	CX-60		mid-size crossover	Japan	2022–present	Japan, Europe, Australia, Taiwan
Mazda	CX-70		mid-size crossover	Japan	2024–present	North America, Australia
Mazda	CX-8		mid-size crossover	Japan	2017–present	Australia, New Zealand, Malaysia
Mazda	CX-80		mid-size crossover	Japan	2024–present	Japan, Europe, Australia
Mazda	CX-90		full-size crossover	Japan	2023–present	North America, Australia, Taiwan
Mazda	EZ-60/CX-6e		electric and range extender mid-size crossover	Japan	2025–present	China, Europe, Australia
Mazda	MX-30		compact crossover	Japan	2020–present	Japan
Mercedes-Benz	EQA		electric luxury subcompact crossover	Germany	2021–present	worldwide
Mercedes-Benz	EQE SUV		electric luxury mid-size crossover	Germany	2022–present	worldwide
Mercedes-Benz	EQS SUV		electric luxury full-size crossover	Germany	2022–present	worldwide
Mercedes-Benz	G-Class		luxury full-size luxury mid-size military mid-size	Germany	1979–present	worldwide
Mercedes-Benz	GLA		luxury subcompact crossover	Germany	2013–present	worldwide
Mercedes-Benz	GLB		luxury compact crossover	Germany	2019–present	Europe, China
Mercedes-Benz	GLC		luxury compact crossover	Germany	2015–present	worldwide
Mercedes-Benz	GLC Coupe		luxury compact crossover coupe	Germany	2016–present	worldwide
Mercedes-Benz	GLC Electric		electric luxury compact crossover	Germany	2026–present	worldwide
Mercedes-Benz	GLE		luxury executive crossover	Germany	2015–present	Europe, North America, Middle East
Mercedes-Benz	GLE Coupe		luxury executive crossover coupe	Germany	2016–present	Europe, North America, Middle East
Mercedes-Benz	GLS		luxury full-size crossover	Germany	2015–present	worldwide
MG	4X		electric compact crossover	China	2026–present	China
MG	Gloster		mid-size	China	2020–present	India
MG	Hector		compact crossover	China	2019–present	India
MG	Hector Plus		compact crossover	China	2020–present	India
MG	Hector Tomahawk		electric and plug-in hybrid compact crossover	China	2026–present	India
MG	HS		compact crossover	China	2018–present	Asia
MG	IM6		electric mid-size crossover	China	2025–present	worldwide except North America and China
MG	MGS5 EV		electric compact crossover	China	2025–present	worldwide except North America and China
MG	MGS6 EV		electric mid-size crossover	China	2025–present	Europe
MG	MGS9 PHEV		plug-in hybrid mid-size crossover	China	2026–present	Europe
MG	One		compact crossover	China	2021–present	China
MG	RX5		compact crossover	China	2016–present	Cambodia, South America
MG	RX8		mid-size crossover	China	2018–present	Middle East
MG	RX9/QS		mid-size crossover	China	2024–present	Middle East, Australia
MG	VS		compact crossover	China	2023–present	Thailand, Indonesia
MG	ZS		compact crossover	China	2017–present	worldwide except North America and China
MG	ZS EV		electric compact crossover	China	2019–present	worldwide except North America and China
Mini	Aceman		electric subcompact crossover	United Kingdom	2024–present	worldwide
Mini	Countryman		subcompact crossover	United Kingdom	2010–present	worldwide
Mini	Countryman E/SE		electric subcompact crossover	United Kingdom	2024–present	worldwide
Mitsubishi	ASX		subcompact crossover	Japan	2010–present	worldwide
Mitsubishi	Destinator		compact crossover	Japan	2025–present	Southeast Asia, Middle East, Africa, Latin America
Mitsubishi	Eclipse Cross		compact crossover	Japan	2017–present	worldwide
Mitsubishi	Eclipse Cross EV		electric compact crossover	Japan	2025–present	Europe
Mitsubishi	Grandis		compact crossover	Japan	2025–present	Europe
Mitsubishi	Outlander		mid-size crossover	Japan	2001–present	worldwide, except China
Mitsubishi	Outlander PHEV		plug-in Hybrid mid-size crossover	Japan	2012–present	worldwide
Mitsubishi	Pajero		full-size	Japan	1981–2021, 2026–present	worldwide
Mitsubishi	Pajero Sport		mid-size	Japan	1996–present	worldwide, except North America
Mitsubishi	RVR		subcompact crossover	Japan	2010–present	worldwide
Mitsubishi	Xforce		subcompact crossover	Japan	2023–present	Southeast Asia, Middle East, Africa, Latin America, Taiwan
Neta	Aya		electric subcompact crossover	China	2020–present	China, Thailand, Indonesia
Neta	X		electric compact crossover	China	2020–present	China, Thailand, Indonesia
Nio	EC6		electric mid-size crossover	China	2020–present	China
Nio	EC7		electric mid-size crossover	China	2023–present	China
Nio	ES6/EL6		electric mid-size crossover	China	2019–present	China, Europe
Nio	ES7/EL7		electric mid-size crossover	China	2022–present	China, Europe
Nio	ES8/EL8		electric full-size crossover	China	2018–present	China, Europe
Nio	ES9		electric full-size crossover	China	2026–present	China
Nissan	Ariya		electric compact crossover	Japan	2020–present	worldwide
Nissan	Armada		full-size	Japan	2004–present	United States, Canada, Mexico, Russia, Middle East
Nissan	Juke		subcompact crossover	Japan	2010–present	worldwide
Nissan	Kait/Kicks e-Power		subcompact crossover	Japan	2026–present	South America, and Thailand
Nissan	Kicks		subcompact crossover	Japan	2016–present	worldwide, except Europe
Nissan	Leaf		electric subcompact crossover	Japan	2025–present	worldwide
Nissan	Magnite		subcompact crossover	Japan	2020–present	Asia
Nissan	Murano		mid-size crossover	Japan	2002–present	worldwide
Nissan	NX8		electric and range extender mid-size crossover	Japan	2026–present	China
Nissan	Pathfinder		mid-size crossover	Japan	1985–present	North America
Nissan	Pathfinder (China)		mid-size crossover	Japan	2023–present	China
Nissan	Patrol		subcompact(1951–2002), full-size/luxury full-size(1987–present)	Japan	1951–present	worldwide, except South America, United States and Europe
Nissan	Qashqai		compact crossover	Japan	2007–present	worldwide, (sold as Rogue Sport in United States and Canada, 2017–2022)
Nissan	Rogue		compact crossover	Japan	2007–present	United States, Canada, Mexico
Nissan	Rogue Plug-in Hybrid		plug-in Hybrid compact crossover	Japan	2026–present	United States
Nissan	Terra		mid-size	Japan	2018–present	Asia
Nissan	X-Trail		compact crossover	Japan	2001–present	worldwide, except United States and Canada
Omoda	C5/5		compact crossover	China	2023–present	worldwide (except China)
Omoda	E5/C5 EV		electric compact crossover	China	2023–present	worldwide (except China)
Omoda	C7/7		compact crossover	China	2024–present	worldwide (except China)
Omoda	C9/9		mid-size crossover	China	2024–present	worldwide (except China)
Omoda	O4		subcompact crossover	China	2026–present	worldwide (except China)
Onvo	L60		electric mid-size crossover	China	2024–present	China
Onvo	L80		electric full-size crossover	China	2026–present	China
Onvo	L90		electric full-size crossover	China	2025–present	China
Opel	Frontera		subcompact crossover	Germany	2024–present	Europe (except United Kingdom), Chile
Opel	Grandland		compact crossover	Germany	2017–present	Europe (except United Kingdom), Chile
Opel	Mokka		subcompact crossover	Germany	2012–present	Europe (except United Kingdom), Chile
Ora	5		electric compact crossover	China	2025–present	China, Thailand, Australia
Perodua	Aruz		compact crossover	Malaysia	2019–present	Malaysia
Perodua	Ativa		subcompact crossover	Malaysia	2021–present	Malaysia
Perodua	QV-E		electric subcompact crossover	Malaysia	2025–present	Malaysia
Perodua	Traz		subcompact crossover	Malaysia	2025–present	Malaysia
Peugeot	2008/ e-2008		subcompact crossover	France	2010–present	Europe, Asia, South America, Australia
Peugeot	3008/ e-3008		compact crossover	France	2009–present	Europe, Asia
Peugeot	408/ e-408		compact crossover	France	2022–present	Europe, Asia
Peugeot	5008/ e-5008		mid-size crossover	France	2009–present	Asia, Australia, Europe, Middle East, North Africa
Polestar	2		electric luxury compact crossover	Sweden	2019–present	worldwide
Polestar	3		electric luxury mid-size crossover	Sweden	2024–present	worldwide
Polestar	4		electric luxury compact crossover	Sweden	2023–present	worldwide
Porsche	Macan		electric luxury compact crossover	Germany	2013–present	worldwide
Porsche	Cayenne		luxury mid-size crossover (1st~3rd) electric luxury mid-size crossover (4th)	Germany	2002–present	worldwide
Proton	eMas 7		electric compact crossover	Malaysia	2024–present	Malaysia
Proton	eMas 7 PHEV		plug-in hybrid compact crossover	Malaysia	2026–present	Malaysia
Proton	X50		subcompact crossover	Malaysia	2020–present	Malaysia
Proton	X70		compact crossover	Malaysia	2018–present	Malaysia
Proton	X90		mid-size crossover	Malaysia	2023–present	Malaysia
Pyeonghwa	Pronto		compact crossover	North Korea	2005–present	North Korea, Vietnam
Renault	Arkana		compact crossover	France	2019–present	Europe, South Korea
Renault	Austral		compact crossover	France	2022–present	Europe
Renault	Boreal		compact crossover	France	2025–present	Brazil
Renault	Captur		subcompact crossover	France	2013–present	worldwide (128 countries)
Renault	Espace		mid-size crossover	France	2023–present	Europe
Renault	Filante		mid-size crossover	France	2026–present	South Korea
Renault	Kiger		subcompact crossover	France	2021–present	Asia
Renault	Koleos/Grand Koleos		mid-size crossover	France	2008–present	worldwide, except Europe, United States, Canada
Renault	Rafale		mid-size crossover	France	2024–present	Europe
Renault	Scenic E-Tech		electric compact crossover	France	2024–present	Europe, South Korea
Renault	Symbioz		compact crossover	France	2024–present	Europe
Rivian	R1S		luxury mid-size crossover	United States	2022–present	
Rivian	R2		electric mid-size	United States	2026–present	
Rising Auto	R7		electric mid-size crossover	China	2022–present	China
Roewe	Jiayue 07		mid-size crossover	China	2026–present	China
Rolls-Royce	Cullinan		luxury crossover	United Kingdom	2018–present	worldwide
Rox	01		mid-size crossover	China	2023–present	China
SAIC	H5		electric and range extender mid-size crossover	China	2025–present	China
Saipa	Aria		compact crossover	Iran	2023–present	Iran
SEAT	Arona		subcompact crossover	Spain	2017–present	Europe
Sehol	QX		compact crossover	China	2021–present	China
Sehol	X4		compact crossover	China	2020–present	China
Sehol	X6		compact crossover	China	2022–present	China
Sehol	X7		mid-size crossover	China	2020–present	China
Sehol	X8		mid-size crossover	China	2020–present	China
Škoda	Elroq		electric compact crossover	Czech Republic	2025–present	Europe
Škoda	Enyaq		electric compact crossover	Czech Republic	2020–present	Europe
Škoda	Epiq		electric subcompact crossover	Czech Republic	2026–present	Europe
Škoda	Kamiq		subcompact crossover	Czech Republic	2019–present	worldwide, except North America, Asia
Škoda	Karoq		compact crossover	Czech Republic	2017–present	worldwide, except North America, Asia
Škoda	Kodiaq		mid-size crossover	Czech Republic	2017–present	worldwide, except North America
Škoda	Kushaq		subcompact crossover	Czech Republic	2021–present	India, Vietnam
Škoda	Kylaq		subcompact crossover	Czech Republic	2025–present	India
Škoda	Peaq		electric mid-size crossover	Czech Republic	2026–present	Europe
Smart	#1		electric subcompact crossover	Germany	2022–present	worldwide
Smart	#3		electric compact crossover	Germany	2023–present	worldwide
Smart	#5		electric and plug-in hybrid mid-size crossover	Germany	2024–present	worldwide
Soueast	S06		compact crossover	China	2024–present	Middle East, Central Asia, and Latin America
Soueast	S07		mid-size crossover	China	2024–present	Middle East, Central Asia, and Latin America
Soueast	S09		mid-size crossover	China	2024–present	Middle East, Central Asia, and Latin America
Stelato	G9		electric and range extender luxury full-size	China	2026–present	China
Subaru	Ascent		mid-size crossover	Japan	2018–present	United States
Subaru	Crosstrek		compact crossover	Japan	2012–present	worldwide
Subaru	Forester		compact crossover	Japan	1997–present	worldwide
Subaru	Levorg Layback		mid-size crossover	Japan	2023–present	Japan
Subaru	Outback		mid-size crossover	Japan	2009–present	worldwide
Subaru	Rex		subcompact crossover	Japan	2022–present	Japan
Subaru	Solterra		electric compact crossover	Japan	2022–present	worldwide
Subaru	Trailseeker/E-Outback		electric mid-size crossover	Japan	2026–present	worldwide
Subaru	Uncharted		electric compact crossover	Japan	2025–present	worldwide
Suzuki	Across		compact crossover	Japan	2020–present	Europe
Suzuki	Brezza		subcompact crossover	Japan	2016–present	India
Suzuki	e Vitara		electric subcompact crossover	Japan	2025–present	worldwide
Suzuki	Fronx		subcompact crossover	Japan	2023–present	Japan, India, Middle East
Suzuki	Grand Vitara		subcompact crossover	Japan	2022–present	Global emerging markets
Suzuki	Jimny		subcompact	Japan	1968–present	worldwide, except North America
Suzuki	S-Cross		subcompact crossover	Japan	2006–present	worldwide, except United States and Canada (United States and Canada from 2007 to 2013)
Suzuki	Vitara		subcompact crossover	Japan	1988–present	Europe, Asia, Africa
Suzuki	Victoris		subcompact crossover	Japan	2025–present	India
Suzuki	Xbee		subcompact crossover	Japan	2017–present	Japan
SWM	G01		compact crossover	China	2018–present	China
SWM	G05		compact crossover	China	2019–present	China
SWM	X3		compact crossover	China	2018–present	China
Tank	300		mid-size	China	2020–present	China
Tank	400		mid-size	China	2023–present	China
Tank	500		mid-size	China	2021–present	China
Tank	700		full-size	China	2024–present	China
Tata	Curvv		subcompact crossover coupe	India	2024–present	India
Tata	Curvv EV		electric subcompact crossover coupe	India	2024–present	India
Tata	Nexon		subcompact crossover	India	2017–present	India
Tata	Nexon EV		electric subcompact crossover	India	2020–present	India
Tata	Harrier		mid-size crossover	India	2019–present	India
Tata	Harrier EV		electric midsize crossover	India	2024–present	India
Tata	Punch		subcompact crossover	India	2021–present	India
Tata	Punch EV		electeic subcompact crossover	India	2024–present	India
Tata	Safari		mid-size	India	1998–present	South Asia, Europe, Middle East, South East Asia, Africa, South America
Tata	Sierra		subcompact crossover	India	2025–present	India
Tata	Sierra EV		electric subcompact crossover	India	2026–present	India
Tesla	Model Y		electric luxury compact crossover	United States	2020–present	worldwide
Togg	T10X		compact crossover	Turkey	2023–present	Turkey
Toyota	Aygo X		subcompact crossover	Japan	2022–present	Europe
Toyota	bZ3X		electric compact crossover	Japan	2025–present	China
Toyota	bZ4X/bZ		electric compact crossover	Japan	2022–present	worldwide
Toyota	bZ4X Touring/bZ Woodland		electric mid-size crossover	Japan	2026–present	worldwide
Toyota	bZ5		electric compact crossover	Japan	2025–present	China
Toyota	C-HR		subcompact crossover	Japan	2017–present	Europe, Australasia
Toyota	C-HR+/C-HR		electric compact crossover	Japan	2025–present	Europe, North America
Toyota	Corolla Cross / Frontlander		compact crossover	Japan	2020–present	worldwide
Toyota	Century SUV		luxury full-size	Japan	2023–present	Japan, China
Toyota	Crown Sport		mid-size crossover	Japan	2023–present	Japan
Toyota	Crown Estate/Signia		mid-size crossover	Japan	2024–present	Japan, North America and Canada
Toyota	Fortuner / SW4		mid-size	Japan	2005–present	Asia, Australia, New Zealand, South America, Middle East, France (New Caledonia)
Toyota	Grand Highlander		mid-size crossover	Japan	2023–present	North America
Toyota	Land Cruiser Wagon 3-Door		subcompact	Japan	1984–present	Middle East
Toyota	Land Cruiser Wagon 4-Door		compact	Japan	1984–present	Japan, Australia, New Zealand, Africa, Middle East
Toyota	Land Cruiser FJ		compact	Japan	2026–present	Japan, Southeast Asia, Latin America
Toyota	Land Cruiser Prado/250		mid-size/luxury mid-size	Japan	1990–present	worldwide
Toyota	Land Cruiser		compact(1955–1984), full-size/luxury full-size(VX Wagon 1967–present)	Japan	1951–present	worldwide, except Canada and South Korea
Toyota	Harrier		luxury compact crossover (1988–2003), luxury mid-size crossover (2003–present)	Japan	1998–present	worldwide, except North America and China
Toyota	Highlander / Kluger / Crown Kluger		mid-size crossover	Japan	2000–present	Asia, North America, Europe, Australia, New Zealand, China
Toyota	Raize		subcompact crossover	Japan	2019–present	Asia
Toyota	RAV4		compact crossover	Japan	1994–present	worldwide
Toyota	4Runner		compact(1984–2002), mid-size(2003–present)	Japan	1984–present	United States, Canada
Toyota	Rush		compact crossover	Japan	2006–present	ASEAN, South Africa, UAE, Pakistan
Toyota	Sequoia		full-size/luxury full-size	Japan	2000–present	United States, Canada, Mexico, Bolivia, Middle East
Toyota	Urban Cruiser / Urban Cruiser Hyryder		subcompact crossover	Japan	2020–present	India
Toyota	Urban Cruiser Taisor / Starlet Cross		subcompact crossover	Japan	2024–present	India
Toyota	Urban Cruiser / Urban Cruiser Ebella		electric subcompact crossover	Japan	2025–present	worldwide
Toyota	Wildlander		compact crossover	Japan	2020–present	China
Toyota	Yaris Cross		subcompact crossover	Japan	2020–present	Asia, Europe
Trumpchi	Emkoo		compact crossover	China	2022–present	worldwide
Trumpchi	GS3		subcompact crossover	China	2017–present	China, South America
Trumpchi	GS4		compact crossover	China	2015–present	China, South America
Trumpchi	GS8		full-size crossover	China	2016–present	China, Russia
Trumpchi	ES9		full-size crossover	China	2023–present	China
Trumpchi	Xiangwang S7		mid-size crossover	China	2025–present	China
Trumpchi	Xiangwang S9		full-size crossover	China	2025–present	China
Trumpchi	Yue 7		full-size	China	2026–present	China
UAZ	469		subcompact	Russia	1971–present	Russia, Mongolia, South East Asia
UAZ	Patriot		compact	Russia	2005–present	Russia
Vauxhall	Frontera		subcompact crossover	United Kingdom	2024–present	United Kingdom
Vauxhall	Grandland		compact crossover	United Kingdom	2017–present	United Kingdom
Vauxhall	Mokka		subcompact crossover	United Kingdom	2012–present	United Kingdom
Venucia	T60		subcompact crossover	China	2018–present	China
Venucia	V-Online		compact crossover	China	2021–present	China
Venucia	VX6		electric compact crossover	China	2023–present	China
Venucia	Xing		compact crossover	China	2020–present	China
VGV	U70		mid-size crossover	China	2019–present	China
VGV	U75		mid-size crossover	China	2021–present	China
VinFast	VF e34		electric subcompact crossover	Vietnam	2021–present	Vietnam
VinFast	VF 3		electric subcompact crossover	Vietnam	2024–present	Vietnam
VinFast	VF 5		electric compact crossover	Vietnam	2023–present	Vietnam
VinFast	VF 6		electric subcompact crossover	Vietnam	2024–present	Vietnam
VinFast	VF 7		electric compact crossover	Vietnam	2024–present	Vietnam
VinFast	VF 8		electric mid-size crossover	Vietnam	2023–present	Vietnam
VinFast	VF 9		electric full-size crossover	Vietnam	2023–present	Vietnam
Volkswagen	Atlas / Teramont		mid-size crossover	Germany	2017–present	United States, Canada, Mexico, China
Volkswagen	Atlas Cross Sport / Teramont X		mid-size crossover coupe	Germany	2019–present	United States, Canada, Mexico, China
Volkswagen	ID.4		electric compact crossover	Germany	2020–present	worldwide
Volkswagen	ID.5		electric compact crossover coupe	Germany	2021–present	worldwide
Volkswagen	ID.6		electric mid-size crossover	Germany	2021–present	China
Volkswagen	ID. Aura T6		electric mid-size crossover	Germany	2026–present	China
Volkswagen	ID. Cross		electric subcompact crossover	Germany	2026–present	Europe
Volkswagen	ID. Era 5X		electric compact crossover	Germany	2026–present	China
Volkswagen	ID. Era 8X		range extender mid-size crossover	Germany	2026–present	China
Volkswagen	ID. Era 9X		range extender full-size crossover	Germany	2026–present	China
Volkswagen	ID. Unyx 06		electric compact crossover	Germany	2024–present	China
Volkswagen	ID. Unyx 08		electric full-size crossover	Germany	2026–present	China
Volkswagen	T-Cross / Taigun		subcompact crossover	Germany	2018–present	Europe, Asia
Volkswagen	T-Roc		subcompact crossover	Germany	2018–present	Europe, China
Volkswagen	Talagon		full-size crossover	Germany	2021–present	China
Volkswagen	Taigo / Nivus		subcompact crossover	Germany	2020–present	Europe, South America
Volkswagen	Taos / Tharu		compact crossover	Germany	2018–present	America, China
Volkswagen	Tavendor		full-size crossover	Germany	2022–present	China, Middle East
Volkswagen	Tayron / Tiguan		compact crossover (1st) mid-size crossover (2nd)	Germany	2018–present	China (1st) worldwide (2nd)
Volkswagen	Tayron X		compact crossover coupe	Germany	2020–present	China
Volkswagen	Tera		subcompact crossover	Germany	2025–present	Latin America
Volkswagen	Tharu XR		subcompact crossover	Germany	2024–present	China
Volkswagen	Tiguan		compact crossover	Germany	2007–present	worldwide
Volvo	EC40		electric luxury subcompact crossover	Sweden	2021–present	worldwide
Volvo	EX30		electric luxury subcompact crossover	Sweden	2023–present	worldwide
Volvo	EX40		electric luxury compact crossover	Sweden	2019–present	worldwide
Volvo	EX60		electric luxury compact crossover	Sweden	2026–present	worldwide
Volvo	EX90		electric luxury full-size crossover	Sweden	2024–present	worldwide
Volvo	XC40		luxury subcompact crossover	Sweden	2018–present	worldwide
Volvo	XC60		luxury compact crossover	Sweden	2008–present	worldwide
Volvo	XC70		plug-in hybrid luxury mid-size crossover	Sweden	2025–present	China
Volvo	XC90		luxury mid-size crossover	Sweden	2003–present	worldwide
Voyah	Courage		electric compact crossover	China	2024–present	China
Voyah	Free		electric mid-size crossover	China	2021–present	China
Voyah	Passion S		electric mid-size coupe crossover	China	2026–present	China
Voyah	Taishan		plug-in hybrid full-size crossover	China	2025–present	China
Voyah	Taishan X8		electric and plug-in hybrid full-size crossover	China	2026–present	China
Wallyscar	Iris		subcompact crossover	Tunisia	2017–present	Tunisia
Wey	Lanshan		luxury full-size crossover	China	2023–present	China
Wey	Latte		luxury compact crossover	China	2021–present	China, Europe
Wey	Mocha		luxury mid-size crossover	China	2021–present	China, Europe
Wey	V8X		luxury mid-size crossover	China	2026–present	China
Wey	V9X		luxury full-size crossover	China	2026–present	China
Wuling	Almaz		compact crossover	China	2019–present	Indonesia
Wuling	Xingchen/Asta		compact crossover	China	2021–present	China
Wuling	Xingchi/Alvez		subcompact crossover	China	2022–present	China
Wuling	Binguo Plus		subcompact crossover	China	2024–present	China
Wuling	Binguo S		subcompact crossover	China	2025–present	China
Wuling	Nebula		compact crossover	China	2023–present	China
Wuling	Starlight 560/Eksion		petrol, electric and plug-in hybrid compact crossover	China	2026–present	China
Wuling	Starlight L		plug-in hybrid full-size crossover	China	2026–present	China
Wuling	Starlight S		electric and plug-in hybrid compact crossover	China	2024–present	China
Xiaomi	SkyNomad N70		range extender mid-size	China	2026–present	China
Xiaomi	SkyNomad N90		range extender full-size	China	2026–present	China
Xiaomi	YU7		electric luxury mid-size crossover	China	2025–present	China
XPeng	G6		electric and range extender mid-size crossover	China	2023–present	worldwide
XPeng	G7		electric and range extender mid-size crossover	China	2025–present	China
XPeng	G9		electric and range extender mid-size crossover	China	2022–present	worldwide
XPeng	G9L		electric and range extender full-size	China	2026–present	worldwide
XPeng	GX		electric and range extender full-size luxury	China	2026–present	China, Middle East
XPeng	Mona L03 / L03		electric and range extender compact crossover	China	2026–present	worldwide
XPeng	Mona L05		electric and range extender mid-size crossover	China	2026–present	worldwide
Yangwang	U8		range extender full-size crossover	China	2023–present	China
Yangwang	U8L		range extender full-size crossover	China	2025–present	China
Yudo	Yuntu		electric subcompact crossover	China	2023–present	China
Zeekr	X		electric luxury compact crossover	China	2023–present	worldwide
Zeekr	7X		electric luxury mid-size crossover	China	2024–present	worldwide
Zeekr	8X		plug-in hybrid luxury full-size crossover	China	2026–present	China
Zeekr	9X		plug-in hybrid luxury full-size crossover	China	2025–present	China

== Similar Military/Commercial vehicles ==
This is not a complete list

Manufacturer	SUV	Image	Class	Country of origin	Years produced	Countries available
Agrale	Marruá		military full-size	Brazil	2005–present	Brazil, Ecuador, Argentina, Paraguay
AM General	BRV-O		military full-size	United States	2013–present	United States, Canada
AM General	Humvee		military full-size	United States	1984–present	worldwide
American Growler	Growler		military compact	United States	2009–present	United States, Canada
Automotive Industries	Storm		military compact	Israel	1990–present	Israel, Chile
BAW	BJ212		compact/military compact	China	Unknown	China, Syria
BAW	BJ2022		military compact	China	2002–present	China, Syria
BAW	Yongshi		compact	China	????–present	China
Force Protection Europe	Ocelot		military full-size	United Kingdom	2011–present	United Kingdom
CENARECA	Tiuna		military full-size	Venezuela	2004–present	Venezuela, Ecuador, Bolivia, Cuba
Dartz	T-98 Kombat		armored luxury full-size/military full-size	Russia	2010–present	Russia, Eastern Europe, United States, Canada, Mexico, Middle East
Dongfeng	EQ2050		military full-size/luxury full-size	China	????–present	China, Bangladesh, Belarus, Zimbabwe, Namibia
Fath Vehicle Industries	Safir		military subcompact	Iran	2009–present	Iran
GAZ	2975		military full-size, full-size	Russia	2001–present	Russia, Armenia, China, Guinea, Mongolia, Nicaragua, North Korea, Uruguay, Brazil, India
Iveco	LMV		military full-size	Italy	????–present	Italy, Austria, Belgium, Bosnia and Herzegovina, Croatia, Czech Republic, Norway, Russia, Slovakia, Spain, United Kingdom
Komatsu	LAV		military full-size	Japan	2002–present	Japan
Lockheed Martin	JLTV		military full-size	United States	2015–	United States
Mercedes-Benz	G-Class		luxury mid-size military mid-size	Germany	1979–present	worldwide
MOWAG	Eagle		military full-size	Switzerland	2003–present	Switzerland, Denmark, Germany, Netherlands
Navistar International	MaxxPro		military full-size	United States	2007–present	United States, Estonia, Greece, Hungary, Poland, Romania, Singapore, South Korea
Navistar International	MXT-MV		military full-size	United States	2006–present	United States
Oshkosh	L-ATV / JLTV		military full-size	United States	2013–	United States
Oshkosh/Plasan	M-ATV		military full-size	United States	2009–present	United States, Afghanistan, United Arab Emirates, Poland
Oshkosh/Plasan	Sand Cat		military full-size	United States/Israel	2008–present	United States, Israel
Otokar	Cobra		military full-size	Turkey	1997–present	Turkey, Bangladesh, Bahrain, Cameroon, Georgia, Kazakhstan, Maldives, Nigeria, Slovenia, United Arab Emirates, Pakistan
Panhard	Peugeot P4		military subcompact	France	1981–present	France
Paramount Group	Marauder		military full-size	South Africa	2008–present	South Africa, Azerbaijan, Jordan
Paramount Group	Marauder(civilian version)		luxury full-size	South Africa	2008–present	worldwide
Pindad	Komodo		military full-size	Indonesia	2012–present	Indonesia
Plasan/Oshkosh	Sand Cat		military full-size	Israel/United States	2005–present	Israel, France, Bulgaria, Canada, Colombia, Mexico, Nigeria, Sweden, Netherlands, United States
Renault Trucks	Sherpa 2		military full-size	France	2006–present	Europe, Middle East, Asia, Latin America
SAC	SAC SFQ2040		military full-size	South Korea	????–present	China
UAZ	UAZ-469		military compact	Russia	1971–present	Worldwide
UROVESA	VAMTAC		military full-size	Spain	1988–present	Spain, Dominican Republic, Saudi Arabia, Malaysia, Chile, Morocco, Romania, Venezuela
Weststar Defence Industries	Weststar GK-M1		military full-size	Malaysia	Unknown	South East Asia

== Past Models ==
Manufacturer	Model	Image	Class	Country of origin	Years produced	Countries available
Acura	CDX		luxury subcompact crossover	Japan	2016–2022	China
Acura	RDX		luxury compact crossover	Japan	2006–2026	United States, Canada, Mexico
Acura	SLX		luxury mid-size	Japan	1995–1999	
Acura	ZDX		mid-size luxury crossover (1st) battery electric mid-size luxury crossover (2nd)	Japan	2009–2013; 2024–2025	United States, Canada, Mexico
Aeolus	AX3		subcompact crossover	China	2015–2019	China
Aeolus	AX4		subcompact crossover	China	2017–2021	China
Aeolus	AX5		compact crossover	China	2016–2020	China
Aeolus	AX7		compact crossover	China	2014–2025	China
Aion	V Plus		electric compact crossover	China	2021–2024	China
Aiways	U5		electric compact crossover	China	2019–2023	China, Europe
Aiways	U6		electric compact crossover	China	2021–2023	China, Europe
Alfa Romeo	AR 51 Matta		mini	Italy	1951–1953	
Alpina	XD3		luxury mid-size crossover	Germany	2018–2024	Europe
Alpina	XD4		luxury mid-size crossover	Germany	2018–2025	Europe
American Bantam	Bantam BRC-40		military mini	United States	1940	
AMC	M422 Mighty Mite		military micro	United States	1959–1962	
AMC	Eagle		compact crossover	United States	1979–1987	
AM General	M151		military mini	United States	1959–1982	
ARO	IMS Series		off-road vehicle	Romania	1957–1975	
ARO	ARO 24 Series		mini, compact, mid-size, full-size SUV	Romania	1972–2006	
ARO	10 Series		mini, compact, mid-size SUV	Romania	1980–2006	
Asia	Rocsta		mini	South Korea	1990–1997	
Aston Martin	DBX		full-size crossover	United Kingdom	2020–2025	worldwide
Austin	Champ		military mini	United Kingdom	1951–1956	
Austin	Gipsy		mini	United Kingdom	1958–1968	
Auverland	P3		mini, compact	France	1989–2005	
Audi	Q2		luxury subcompact crossover	Germany	2016–2026	worldwide except United States, Canada and China
Audi	Q2L e-tron		electric luxury subcompact crossover	Germany	2019–2025	China
Audi	Q8 e-tron		electric luxury mid-size crossover	Germany	2018–2025	worldwide
Audi	Q8 e-tron Sportback		electric luxury mid-size crossover coupe	Germany	2020–2025	worldwide
Audi	SQ2		luxury subcompact performance crossover	Germany	2018–2026	worldwide except North America
Baojun	510		subcompact crossover	China	2017–2021	China
Baojun	530		compact crossover	China	2018–2021	China
Baojun	560		compact crossover	China	2015–2018	China
Baojun	RS-3		subcompact crossover	China	2019–2023	China
Baojun	RS-5		compact crossover	China	2018–2021	China
Baojun	RM-5		mid-size crossover	China	2019–2021	China
Baojun	RS-7		mid-size crossover	China	2020–2022	China
BAW	Yusheng 007		subcompact crossover	China	2011–2017	China
BAW	Luba		full-size	China	2001–2017	China
BAW	Qishi		compact	China	2009–2014	China
BMW	325		military mids-ize	Germany	1937–1940	
BMW	X4		luxury compact crossover	Germany	2014–2025	worldwide
BMW M	X3 M Competition		sport luxury compact crossover	Germany	2019–2024	worldwide
BMW M	X4 M Competition		sport luxury compact crossover	Germany	2019–2025	worldwide
Beijing	BJ20		subcompact crossover	China	2015–2020	China
Beijing	BJ80		luxury executive crossover	China	2016–2025	China
Beijing	BJ90		full-size luxury	China	2017–2023	China
Beijing	EX3		electric subcompact crossover	China	2018–2022	China
Beijing	EX5		electric compact crossover	China	2019–2024	China
Beijing	X5		compact crossover	China	2015–2025	China, Europe
Bestune	B70S		compact crossover	China	2022–2025	China
Bestune	X80		compact crossover	China	2013–2020	China
Bestune	X40		subcompact crossover	China	2016–2019	China
Bestune	E01		electric compact crossover	China	2021–2025	China
Bestune	T55		compact crossover	China	2021–2025	China
Bestune	T99		mid-size crossover	China	2019–2025	China
Bisu	T3		subcompact crossover	China	2016–2020	China
Bisu	T5		mid-size crossover	China	2016–2020	China
BJEV	EC5		electric subcompact crossover	China	2016–2019	China
Borgward	B2000		military full-size	Western Germany	1955–1961	
Borgward	BX3		compact crossover	China	2020–2021	Bahrain, China, United Arab Emirates, Iran, Laos, Qatar
Borgward	BX5		compact crossover	China	2016–2021	Bahrain, China, United Arab Emirates, Iran, Laos, Qatar
Borgward	BX6		crossover	China	2018–2019	China
Borgward	BX7		mid-size crossover	China	2016–2021	Bahrain, China, United Arab Emirates, Iran, Laos, Qatar
Brilliance	V3		subcompact crossover	China	2015–2020	China
Brilliance	V5		compact crossover	China	2012–2020	China, South America, Russia
Brilliance	V6		mid-size crossover	China	2018–2020	China
Brilliance	V7		mid-size crossover	China	2018–2020	China
Brilliance	FRV Cross		compact crossover	China	2009–2013	China
Buick	Electra E4		electric mid-size crossover	United States	2023–2025	China
Buick	Encore		subcompact crossover	United States	2012–2022	China (Gen 2) United States, Canada (Gen 1)
Buick	Rainier		luxury mid-size	United States	2003–2007	United States
Buick	Rendezvous		luxury mid-size crossover	United States	2001–2007	United States
Buick	Velite 7		electric subcompact crossover	United States	2020–2022	China
BYD	Frigate 07		plug-in hybrid mid-size crossover	China	2022–2025	China
BYD	S2		subcompact crossover	China	2019–2022	China
BYD	S6		mid-size crossover	China	2011–2016	China
BYD	S6 DM		Hybrid mid-size crossover	China	2012–2016	China, North America, Russia
BYD	S7		mid-size crossover	China	2014–2018	China
BYD	Sealion 07 DM-i		plug-in hybrid mid-size crossover	China	2025–2026	China
BYD	Song		compact crossover	China	2015–2022	China
BYD	Yuan		subcompact crossover	China	2016–2024	China
Cadillac	GT4		luxury compact crossover	United States	2023–2026	China
Cadillac	SRX		luxury mid-size (2003–2010) luxury compact crossover (2010–2016)	United States	2003–2016	worldwide
Changhe	Q7		mid-size crossover	China	2017–2020	China
Changhe	Q25		subcompact crossover	China	2015–2019	China
Changhe	Q35		compact crossover	China	2015–2020	China
Changan	CS15		subcompact crossover	China	2015–2023	China
Changan	CS35		subcompact crossover	China	2012–2022	China, Russia
Changan	CS55		compact crossover	China	2017–2024	China
Changan	CS55 EV		electric compact crossover	China	2020–2022	China
Changan	CS75		mid-size crossover	China	2013–2024	China, South America
Changan	CS75 PHEV		plug-in hybrid mid-size crossover	China	2018–2022	China
Changan	CS85		mid-size crossover coupe	China	2019–2025	China
Changan	CS95		full-size luxury crossover	China	2017–2025	China
Changan	Nevo Q05 Classic		plug-in hybrid compact crossover	China	2023–2026	China
Chery	eQ5		electric compact crossover	China	2020–2023	China
Chery	Fulwin T6		plug-in hybrid compact crossover	China	2024–2025	China
Chery	Tansuo 06		compact crossover	China	2023–2026	China
Chery	Tiggo		compact crossover	China	2006–2014	China, South East Asia, Russia, South America, Africa
Chery	Tiggo 3		compact crossover	China	2014–2023	China, South East Asia, Russia, South America, Africa
Chery	Tiggo 3xe		subcompact electric crossover	China	2016–2022	China, South America
Chery	Tiggo 5 / Grand Tiggo		compact crossover	China	2014–2021	China, South America
Chery	X1		subcompact crossover	China	2009–2014	
Chevrolet	Bolt EUV		electric subcompact crossover SUV	United States	2021–2023	United States
Chevrolet	Captiva Sport		compact crossover	United States	2006–2015	United States
Chevrolet	K5 Blazer		full-size	United States/Brazil	1969–2001	
Chevrolet	Niva		subcompact crossover	United States	2003–2020	Russia
Chevrolet	S-10 Blazer 2 & 4 Door		compact SUV (1983–1994), mid-size SUV (1995–2005)	United States	1983–2005	
Chevrolet	Tracker (Americas)		compact	United States	1996–2016	Ecuador
Chrysler	Aspen		luxury full-size	United States	2007–2009	
Chrysler	Pacifica		luxury mid-size crossover	United States	2003–2007	
Ciimo	M-NV		electric compact crossover	China	2021–2024	China
Ciimo	X-NV		electric compact crossover	China	2019–2024	China
Citroen	Méhari		mini	France	1968–1988	
Citroën	C-Crosser		compact crossover	France	2007–2012	Europe
Citroën	C3-XR		subcompact crossover	France-China	2014–2023	China
Citroën	C3L		subcompact crossover	France-China	2020–2021	China
Citroën	C4 Aircross		compact crossover	France	2012–2017	Europe
Citroën	C4 Aircross		subcompact crossover	France	2018–2020	China
Citroën	C4 Cactus		subcompact crossover	France	2014–2024	worldwide
Cournil	Cournil		mini	France	1960–1986	
Cowin	X3		compact crossover	China	2016–2022	China
Cowin	X5		compact crossover	China	2017–2019	China
Cupra	Ateca		compact crossover	Spain	2018–2026	Europe
Daewoo	Winstorm		compact crossover	South Korea	2006–2011	South Korea
Daewoo	Winstorm MaXX		compact crossover	South Korea	2006–2011	South Korea
Dallas	Dallas		mini	France	1981–1998	
Datsun	Cross		compact crossover	Japan	2018–2022	Indonesia
Delahaye	VLR		mini	France	1951–1954	
DKW	Munga		military and civilian mini	West Germany	1956–1968	
Denza	N7		electric mid-size crossover	China	2023–2026	China
Denza	N8		plug-in hybrid mid-size crossover	China	2023–2024	China
Denza	X		mid-size crossover	China	2019–2021	China
Dodge	Hornet		compact crossover	United States	2022–2026	United States, Canada
Dodge	Journey		mid-size crossover	United States	2008–2020	worldwide, except Europe, Africa (except South Africa and Egypt), South Asia, South East Asia, Brazil and South Korea
Dodge	Journey (2021)		compact crossover	United States	2021–2026	Mexico
Dodge	Nitro		compact	United States	2007–2012	
Dodge	Ramcharger		mid-size (before 1993), full-size (after 1999)	United States, Mexico (after 1999)	1974–1993, 1999–2001	
Dodge	Raider		mini	United States	1987–1989	
Dongfeng	Fengdu MX3		compact crossover	China	2017	China
Dongfeng	Fengdu MX5		compact crossover	China	2016–2017	China
Dongfeng	Fengdu MX6		compact crossover	China	2015–2019	China
Dongfeng	Oting		mid-size	China	2003–2015	China
Dorcen	G60		compact crossover	China	2018–2021	China
Dorcen	G60s		compact crossover	China	2019–2021	China
Dorcen	G70S		mid-size crossover	China	2018–2021	China
Docan	V07		mid-size crossover	China	2022	China
DR	4		compact crossover	China	2017–2020	Italy
DR	5		compact crossover	China	2007–2020	Italy
DR	6		compact crossover	China	2017–2020	Italy
DR	F35		compact crossover	China	2020–2023	Italy, Spain
DR	Sportequipe 5		subcopact crossover	China	2023–2025	Italy
DR	Sportequipe 6		compact crossover	China	2023–2026	Italy
DR	Sportequipe 7		mid-size crossover	China	2023–2025	Italy
DR	Sportequipe 8		mid-size crossover	China	2023–2026	Italy
DS	6		compact crossover	France	2014–2020	China
DS	7 Crossback		compact crossover	France	2017–2026	Europe, Asia
Enovate	ME5		electric compact crossover	China	2021–2024	China
Enovate	ME7		electric compact crossover	China	2019–2024	China
Enranger	G3		subcompact crossover	China	2014–2020	China
Eterniti	Artemis		sport luxury mid-size crossover	United Kingdom	2012–2014	Europe, China
Everus	VE-1		electric compact crossover	China	2019–2024	China
Exeed	Zhuifeng		compact crossover	China	2019–2026	China
Fengon	E3		subcompact crossover	China	2019–2022	Asia, Europe
Fengon	ix7		mid-size crossover	China	2019–2023	China
Fiat	500X		subcompact crossover	Italy	2013–2024	Europe, North America
Fiat	Campagnola		mini	Italy	1951–1987	
Fiat	Freemont		mid-size crossover	United States	2011–2016	Europe (except UK), China, Brazil, South Korea
Fiat	Sedici		subcompact crossover	Italy	2005–2014 (LHD), 2005–2010 (RHD)	
Fisker	Ocean		luxury compact crossover	United States	2022–2024	North America
Foday	Explorer		mid-size	China	2002–2017	China
Foday	Landfort		mid-size	China	2015–2020	China
Force	One		mid-size	India	2011–2016	India
Ford	Bronco II		mini	United States	1984–1990	
Ford	EcoSport		subcompact crossover	United States	2003–2023	Australia (2013–2020), Brazil, India, United States/Canada, UK (2017–2022)
Ford	Escape		compact crossover	United States	2000–2025	North America (2000–2012, 2013–present version based on Ford Kuga)
Ford	Excursion		full-size	United States	1999–2005	
Ford	Expedition EL		extended length/luxury extended length	United States	2007–2017	United States, Canada, Mexico, Middle East, Philippines
Ford	Flex		full-size crossover	United States	2008–2019	United States, Canada, Mexico, Middle East
Ford	Freestyle /Taurus X		full-size crossover	United States	2005–2009	United States
Ford	GPW		military mini	United States	1941–1945	
Ford	M151		military mini	United States	1959–1982	
Ford	Maverick		compact	United States	1993–1999	Europe
Ford	Raider		mid-size crossover	United States	1991–1997	Australia
Ford	Territory (Australia)		mid-size crossover	Australia	2004–2016	Australia, New Zealand
Ford	Territory (China)		compact crossover	China	2018–2023	Asia, South America
FPV	F6X		crossover	Australia	2008–2009	Australia
Forthing	Jingyi X3		subcompact crossover	China	2014–2019	China
Forthing	Jingyi X5		compact crossover	China	2013–2021	China
Forthing	Jingyi X6		mid-size crossover	China	2016–2017	China
Forthing	SX6		mid-size crossover	China	2016–2023	China
Forthing	T5L		mid-size crossover	China	2018–2021	China
Foton	Saga		compact crossover	China	2003–2010	China
Foton	Sauvana		mid-size crossover	China	2014–2021	China
GAZ	GAZ-61		luxury midsize	USSR	1941–1945	
GAZ	GAZ-64		military mini	USSR	1941–1943	
GAZ	GAZ-67		military mini	USSR	1943–1953	
GAZ/ UAZ	GAZ-69		mini	USSR	1953–1972	
GAZ/ UAZ	GAZ-69A		mini	USSR	1953–1972	
GAZ	GAZ-M72		mid-size crossover	USSR	1955–1958	
GAZ	GAZ-24-95		mid-size crossover	USSR	1974	
Geo	Tracker		mini	Canada/Japan	1989–1998	
General Motors	GM CUCV		military mid-size	United States	1984–1987	
General Motors	GM CUCV II		military mid-size	United States	1996–2000	
Geely	Emgrand GS/S		compact crossover	China	2016–2024	China
Geely	GX7		compact crossover	China	2012–2016	China
Geely	GX9		compact crossover	China	2014–2017	China
Geely	Haoyue Pro		compact crossover	China	2024–2025	China
Geely	Yuanjing S1		compact crossover	China	2017–2019	China
Geely	Yuanjing X1		compact crossover	China	2017–2021	China
Geely	Yuanjing X6		compact crossover	China	2016–2024	China
Geely Galaxy	L7		plug-in hybrid compact crossover	China	2023–2026	China
Geely Geometry	C		electric compact crossover	China	2020–2024	China
Geely Geometry	EX3		electric compact crossover	China	2021–2022	China
GMC	Jimmy		mid-size	United States	1968–1991	
GMC	S15 Jimny		mid-size	United States	1983–1998	
GMC	Typhoon		compact high-performance	United States	1992–1993	
GMC	Envoy		full-size	United States	1998–2009	
Goliath	Jagdwagen Typ 31		military mini	West Germany	1955–1956	
Golden Dragon	Righto V3		mid-size	China	2013–2017	China
Gonow	GX6		mid-size/luxury mid-size	China	2010–2016	China
Gonow	Saboo/ Aoosed G3/ GS1		mid-size crossover	China	2010–2015	China
Gonow	Jetstar		mid-size	China	2010–2012	China
Gonow	Aoosed G5		mid-size	China	2010–2012	China
Gonow	Aoosed GX5		mid-size	China	2012–2014	China
Great Wall Motor	Pegasus		compact SUV	China	2002–2009	China, Africa
Great Wall Motor	Safe		compact SUV	China	2002–2009	China, Africa
Great Wall Motor	Sing		full-size SUV	China	2002–2009	China, Africa
Haima	S5		compact crossover	China	2014–2021	China
Haima	S5 Young		subcompact crossover	China	2017–2018	China
Haima	S7		mid-size crossover	China	2010–2020	China
Hanteng	X5		compact crossover	China	2016–2021	China
Hanteng	X7		mid-size crossover	China	2016–2021	China
Hanteng	X8		mid-size crossover	China	2019–2021	China
Hanomag	20B		military mid-size	Germany	1937–1940	
Haval	F5		compact crossover	China	2018–2020	China
Haval	F7		compact crossover	China	2018–2024	China, Russia
Haval	H1		subcompact crossover	China	2013–2021	China
Haval	H2		compact crossover	China	2014–2021	Australia, China, New Zealand
Haval	H2s		subcompact crossover	China	2016–2019	Australia, China, New Zealand
Haval	H3		compact crossover	China	2005–2012	China, South East Asia, Europe, Australia, Africa, Middle East
Haval	H4		compact crossover	China	2017–2020	China, South East Asia, Europe, Australia, Africa, Middle East
Haval	H5 (2010)		compact crossover	China	2010–2020	China, South East Asia, Europe, Australia, Africa, Middle East
Haval	H6 Coupe		compact crossover	China	2015–2021	China, Russia
Haval	H7		mid-size crossover	China	2015–2021	China
Haval	H8		mid-size crossover	China	2013–2018	Australia, China, New Zealand
Haval	M1		mini crossover	China	2007–2010	China
Haval	M2		subcompact crossover	China	2010–2015	China
Haval	M4		subcompact crossover	China	2012–2013	China
Haval	Xiaolong		plug-in hybrid compact crossover	China	2023–2025	China
Hawtai	Bolgheri		mid-size crossover	China	2011–2018	China, Angolia, South East Asia
Hawtai	Santa Fe		mid-size crossover	China	2009–2015	China
Hawtai	Shengdafei		compact crossover	China	2015–2023	China
Hawtai	Terracan		mid-size	China	2003–2011	China
Hengchi	5		electric mid-size crossover	China	2022–2023	China
HiPhi	X		full-size crossover	China	2020–2024	China
HiPhi	Y		mid-size crossover	China	2023–2024	China, Europe
Holden	Acadia		full-size crossover/SUV	Australia	2018–2020	Australia, New Zealand
Holden	Adventra		full-size crossover	Australia	2003–2006	
Holden	Captiva 5		compact crossover	Australia	2006–2015	Australia, New Zealand
Holden	Captiva 7		mid-size crossover	Australia	2006–2017	Australia, New Zealand
Holden	Colorado 7		mid-size	Australia	2012–2016	Australia, New Zealand
Holden	Equinox		mid-size crossover	Australia	2018–2020	Australia, New Zealand
Holden	Frontera		mid-size	Australia	1989–2004	Australia, New Zealand
Holden	Jackaroo		mid-size	Australia	1981–2001	Australia, New Zealand
Holden	Suburban		full-size	Mexico	1998–2001	Australia, New Zealand
Holden	Trailblazer		mid-size	Australia	2016–2020	Australia, New Zealand
Holden	Trax		subcompact crossover	Australia	2013–2020	Australia, New Zealand
Honda	Crossroad		mid-size crossover compact crossover	Japan	1993–1998; 2007–2010	Japan
Honda	Crosstour		mid-size crossover/luxury mid-size crossover	Japan	2009–2015	US, Canada, Mexico, China, Middle East, and Russia
Honda	e:NS1/e:NP1		electric compact crossover	Japan	2022–2025	China
Honda	e:NP2		electric compact crossover	Japan	2024–2026	China
Honda	e:Ny1		electric compact crossover	Japan	2023–2026	Europe
Honda	Element		compact crossover	United States	2003–2011	
Honda	Passport		compact	United States	1994–2002	
Honda	Z		mini	Japan	1998–2002	
Hongqi	E-HS3		electric subcompact luxury crossover	China	2018–2023	China
Hongqi	LS5		full-size luxury	China	2015–2017	China
Horch	Horch-901		military mid-size	Germany	1937–1943	
Horch	Horch-108		military full-size	Germany	1937–1942	
Hotchkiss	M201		mini	France	1954–1960	
Huanghai	Aurora		mid-size	China	2006–2010	China
Huanghai	Challenger		mid-size	China	2009–2012	China
Huanghai	Landscape		compact crossover	China	2010–2015	China
Huanghai	Landscape F1		mid-size crossover	China	2008–2012	China
Huanghai	Landscape V3		mid-size crossover	China	2010–2015	China
Huansu	S2		compact crossover	China	2014–2020	China
Huansu	S3		mid-size crossover	China	2014–2020	China
Huansu	S3L		mid-size crossover	China	2014–2020	China
Huansu	S5		compact crossover	China	2016–2019	China
Huansu	S6		mid-size crossover	China	2015–2020	China
Huansu	S7		mid-size crossover	China	2016–2019	China
Humber	Humber Heavy Utility FWD		military full-size	United Kingdom	1940–1945	
Hummer	H1/H1 Alpha		mid-size	United States	1992–2006	
Hummer	H2		full-size	United States	2003–2009	
Hummer	H3		mid-size	United States	2005–2010	
Hycan	007		electric compact crossover	China	2020–2025	China
Hycan	Z03		electric compact crossover	China	2021–2025	China
Hyundai	Galloper		mid-size	South Korea	1991–2003	
Hyundai	ix25		compact crossover	South Korea/China	2014–2021	China
Hyundai	ix35		compact crossover	South Korea/China	2010–2023	China
Hyundai	ix35 FCEV		fuel cell powered crossover	South Korea	2013–2018	Worldwide, except North Korea
Hyundai	Maxcruz/ Santa Fe XL/ Grand Santa Fe		mid-size crossover	South Korea	2013–2018	South Korea and North America
Hyundai	Terracan		mid-size	South Korea	2001–2007	South Korea
Hyundai	Veracruz/ ix55		mid-size crossover	South Korea	2006–2012	South Korea, North America, Europe and Russia
iCar	03		electric compact crossover	China	2023–2025	China
IFA	P2M		military mini	Eastern Germany	1952–1958	
IFA	P3		military mini	Eastern Germany	1962–1966	
Infiniti	ESQ		luxury subcompact crossover	Japan	2014–2019	China
Infiniti	EX-series		luxury compact crossover	Japan	2007–2013	North America, Europe, Asia
Infiniti	FX-series		luxury mid-size crossover	Japan	2002–2013	worldwide, except Japan, Africa, and South America
Infiniti	JX-series		luxury mid-size crossover	Japan	2012–2013	United States, Canada, Mexico, Middle East, China, Russia
Infiniti	QX4		mid-size	Japan	1996–2003	
Infiniti	QX30		subcompact	United Kingdom	2016–2019	worldwide
Infiniti	QX50		luxury compact crossover	Japan	2013–2025	North America, Europe, Asia
Infiniti	QX55		luxury compact crossover coupe	Japan	2021–2025	North America
Infiniti	QX56		luxury full-size	Japan	2004–2013	United States, Canada, Mexico, Middle East, China, Russia
Infiniti	QX70		luxury mid-size crossover	Japan	2013–2019	worldwide, except Japan, Africa, and South America
International Harvester	International Travelall		full-size	United States	1953–1975	
International Harvester	International Scout		full-size	United States	1961–1980	
Isuzu	Ascender		mid-size/full-size	United States	2003-2008	
Isuzu	Axiom		mid-size	United States	2001–2004	
Isuzu	MU-7		mid-size	Japan	2004–2013	
Isuzu	Trooper		compact	Japan	1981–2002	
Isuzu	VehiCROSS		compact	Japan	1997–2001	
Isuzu	Wizard		mid-size	Japan/United States	1981-2004	
Iveco	Massif		compact, mid-size	Spain	2007–2011	
JAC	J3 Cross		subcompact crossover	China	2008–2017	China
JAC	Rein		mid-size crossover	China	2007–2013	China, Russia
JAC	Refine S2		subcompact crossover	China	2015–2016	China, Russia
JAC	Refine S3		compact crossover	China	2017–2020	China, Russia
JAC	Refine S4		compact crossover	China	2018–2020	China, Russia
JAC	Refine S5		mid-size crossover	China	2013–2019	China
JAC	Refine S7		mid-size crossover	China	2017–2020	China
Jaguar	E-Pace		subcompact luxury crossover	United Kingdom	2017–2024	worldwide
Jaguar	F-Pace		luxury mid-size crossover	United Kingdom	2016–2025	worldwide
Jaguar	I-Pace		electric luxury compact crossover	United Kingdom	2018–2024	worldwide
Jeep	CJ		mini	United States	1964–1986	
Jeep	Cherokee (SJ)		mid-size	United States	1974–1983	
Jeep	Cherokee (XJ)		compact	United States	1984–2001	
Jeep	Cherokee (KL)		compact crossover	United States	2014–2023	worldwide
Jeep	Commander		mid-size	United States/Austria	2006–2010	
Jeep	Grand Cherokee (ZJ)		mid-size	United States	1992–1998	
Jeep	Grand Cherokee (WJ)		mid-size	United States	1999–2005	
Jeep	Grand Cherokee (WK)		mid-size	United States/Austria	2005–2010	
Jeep	Grand Cherokee (WK2)		mid-size crossover	United States	2010–2022	North America
Jeep	Grand Commander/Commander		mid-size crossover	China	2018–2022	China
Jeep	Liberty/Cherokee (KJ)		compact	United States	2001–2006	
Jeep	Liberty/Cherokee (KK)		compact	United States	2007–2012	
Jeep	Patriot		compact	United States	2006–2017	worldwide
Jeep	Wagoneer (SJ)		mid-size	United States	1963–1991	
Jetour	Shanhai L6		plug-in hybrid compact crossover	China	2024–2026	China
Jetour	Shanhai L9		plug-in hybrid mid-size crossover	China	2024–2026	China
Jetour	X95		mid-size crossover	China	2019–2024	China
Jiangling	Baowei		mid-size crossover	China	2005–2016	China
Jiangling	Yusheng S330		compact crossover	China	2016–2018	China
Jiangling	Yusheng S350		mid-size crossover	China	2010–2024	China
Jinbei	Konect		mid-size crossover	China	2018–2021	China
Jinbei	S30		subcompact crossover	China	2013–2017	China
Jinbei	S35		subcompact crossover	China	2015–2017	China
Jinbei	S70		mid-size crossover	China	2016–2018	China
Ji Yue	01		electric mid-size crossover	China	2023–2024	China
Jonway	A380		subcompact crossover	China	2005–2015	China
JMEV	EVeasy EX5		electric subcompact crossover	China	2018–2023	China
JPX	Montez		mini	Brazil	1992–2002	
Junpai	D60		subcompact crossover	China	2014–2019	China
Junpai	D80		compact crossover	China	2018–2019	China
Kawei	W1		mid-size crossover	China	2014–2017	China
Kantanka	Otumfo		mid-size	Ghana	????–????	Africa
Kaiser	M151		military mini	United States	1959–1982	
Kia	Borrego/Mohave		mid-size	South Korea	2008–2024	Middle East, Central Asia, Russia, South Korea
Kia	KX1		subcompact crossover	China	2017–2023	China, Philippines
Kia	KX3		subcompact crossover	China	2015–2023	China
Kia	KX5		compact crossover	China	2016–2021	China
Kia	KX7		mid-size crossover	China	2016–2021	China
Kia	KM131 Jeep		military mini	South Korea	1998–2003	
Kia	Retona		mini	South Korea	1998–2003	
Kia	Niro Plus		subcompact crossover	South Korea	2022–2024	South Korea
Kia	Rio X-Line/KX Cross		subcompact crossover	South Korea	2017–2023	Russia, China
Kia	Soul		subcompact crossover	South Korea	2008–2025	Worldwide, except Europe, Japan and South Korea
Laforza	Laforza		luxury mid-size	Italy/Canada	1985–2003	
Lamborghini	LM002		mid-size	Italy	1986–1993	
Land Rover	Defender		subcompact, compact	United Kingdom	1983–2016	United Kingdom, Africa, Australia, New Zealand, Russia (civil version)
Land Rover	Freelander		luxury compact	United Kingdom	1997–2014	worldwide
Land Rover	Land Rover series		mini, compact	United Kingdom	1948–1986	
Lada	Xray		compact crossover	Russia	2016–2022	Russia, Central Asia
Landwind	X2		subcompact crossover	China	2017–2022	China
Landwind	X5		compact crossover	China	2012–2020	China
Landwind	X6		mid-size crossover	China	2005–2009	China, Philippines
Landwind	X7		compact crossover	China	2015–2019	China
Landwind	X8		mid-size crossover	China	2009–2020	China
Landwind	X9		subcompact crossover	China	2005–2009	China, Philippines
Landwind	Rongyao		compact crossover	China	2019–2021	China
Landwind	Xiaoyao		compact crossover	China	2017–2021	China
Leopaard	Coupe		compact crossover	China	2019–2020	China
Leopaard	CS3		electric subcompact crossover	China	2019–2020	China
Leopaard	CS7		compact crossover	China	2009–2010	China
Leopaard	CS9		subcompact crossover	China	2017–2020	China
Leopaard	CS10		compact crossover	China	2014–2020	China
Leopaard	Feiteng		mini crossover	China	2003–2014	China
Leopaard	Mattu		compact crossover	China	2017–2020	China
Leopaard	Q6		full-size crossover	China	2014–2021	China
Li Auto	L7		range extender luxury mid-size crossover	China	2023–2026	China
Li Auto	One		luxury mid-size crossover	China	2019–2022	China
Lifan	Maiwei		compact crossover	China	2016–2020	China
Lifan	X50		subcompact crossover	China	2011–2019	China
Lifan	X60		compact crossover	China	2011–2018	China, Russia
Lifan	X70		compact crossover	China	2018–2020	China
Lifan	X80		mid-size crossover	China	2017–2020	China
Lincoln	Aviator		luxury mid-size	United States	2002–2005	North America
Lincoln	MKC		luxury compact crossover	United States	2014–2019	North America
Lincoln	MKT		luxury full-size crossover	United States	2009–2019	United States, Canada, Mexico, Middle East, South Korea, Japan
Lincoln	MKX		luxury mid-size crossover	United States	2006–2018	North America, China
LuAZ	LuAZ-969/1302		mini	USSR	1967–2001	
LUIS	4U green		compact	Germany/China	2010–2016	Germany
Luxgen	U5		subcompact crossover	Taiwan	2017–2020	Taiwan, China
Luxgen	U6		compact crossover	Taiwan	2013–2026	Taiwan, China (until 2020)
Luxgen	U7		mid-size crossover	Taiwan	2010–2020	Taiwan, China
Lynk & Co	02		compact crossover	China	2018–2023	China
Mahindra & Mahindra	Armada		compact	India	1993–2001	
Mahindra & Mahindra	Alturas G4		mid-size crossover	India	2018–2022	India, Sri Lanka
Mahindra & Mahindra	Bolero Neo		mini crossover	India	2015–2020	India, Sri Lanka
Mahindra & Mahindra	Invader		mini	India	early 2000s	
Mahindra & Mahindra	XUV300		subcompact crossover	India	2019–2024	India
Mahindra & Mahindra	XUV400		electric subcompact crossover	India	2022–2026	India
Mahindra & Mahindra	XUV500		mid-size crossover	India	2011–2021	India, Sri Lanka, Middle East, South America, Middle East, Africa, Europe
Mahindra & Mahindra	XUV700		mid-size crossover	India	2021–2026	India
Mazda	CX-4		compact crossover	Japan	2016–2025	China
Mazda	CX-7		mid-size crossover	Japan	2006–2012	
Mazda	CX-9		full-size crossover	Japan	2006–2024	North America, Taiwan
Mazda	Navajo		compact	United States	1991–1994	
Mazda	Tribute		compact crossover	Japan/United States	2000–2011	
Maserati	Levante		luxury mid-size crossover	Italy/United States	2017–2024	North America, Europe
Maxus	D60		mid-size crossover	China	2019–2024	China
Mercedes-Benz	EQB		electric luxury subcompact crossover	Germany	2021–2026	worldwide
Mercedes-Benz	EQC		electric luxury compact crossover	Germany	2019–2023	worldwide
Mercedes-Benz	GL-Class		luxury full-size crossover	Germany	2006–2015	worldwide
Mercedes-Benz	GLK-Class		luxury compact crossover	Germany	2008–2015	worldwide
Mercedes-Benz	M-Class		luxury executive crossover	Germany	1997–2015	Europe, North America, Middle East
Mercedes-Benz	W152		military mini	Germany	1937–1941	
Mercury	Mariner		compact crossover	United States	2005–2010	
Mercury	Mountaineer		luxury mid-size	United States	1996–2010	
MG	ES5		electric compact crossover	China	2024–2026	China
MG	EZS		electric compact crossover	China	2019	China
MG	GS		compact crossover	China	2015–2019	worldwide except North America
MG	Marvel R		electric mid-size crossover	China	2021–2026	Europe
Mini	Paceman		subcompact crossover	United Kingdom	2012–2016	worldwide
Mitsubishi	Airtrek		compact crossover	Japan	2001–2008	Japan
Mitsubishi	Airtrek (China)		electric compact crossover	Japan	2021–2023	China
Mitsubishi	Endeavor		mid-size crossover	United States	2003–2011	
Mitsubishi	Jeep J3/J58/J54		mini	Japan	1953–1998	
Mitsubishi	Jeep J10/J38		compact	Japan	1955–1998	
Mitsubishi	Pajero Mini		mini SUV	Japan	1994–2012	Japan
Mitsubishi	Pajero Junior		mini SUV	Japan	1995–1998	Japan
Mitsubishi	Pajero iO		mini SUV	Japan	1998–2015	worldwide, except North America
Mitsubishi	Pajero		subcompact (1982–1991), full-size (1991–2021)	Japan	1982–2021	worldwide, except North America
Monteverdi	Safari		luxury compact	Switzerland	1976–1982	
Moskvitch	410/411		mini crossover	USSR	1957–1961	
MVM	X33		compact crossover	Japan	2008–2014	Iran
Neta	L		electric mid-size crossover	China	2024	China
Neta	N01		electric subcompact crossover	China	2018–2020	China
Nissan	Altra		electric mid-size crossover	Japan	1997–2001	
Nissan	Kix		mini SUV	Japan	2008–2012	Japan
Nissan	Paladin		compact	Japan	2003–2015	China
Nissan	R'nessa		mid-size crossover	Japan	1997–2001	
Nissan	Rasheen		compact	Japan	1994–2000	
Nissan	Skyline Crossover		luxury compact crossover	Japan	2009–2017	Japan
Nissan	Terrano II /Mistral		mid-size	Spain	1993–2006	
Nissan	Terrano		compact	Japan	2012–2022	India, Russia
Nissan	Xterra		compact	Japan	1999–2015	United States, Canada, Mexico, Middle East
Oldsmobile	Bravada		mid-size luxury	United States	1991–1994, 1996–2004	
Opel	Antara		compact crossover	Germany	2006–2015	Europe (except United Kingdom), Lebanon, China, Chile
Opel	Crossland		subcompact crossover	Germany	2017–2024	Europe (except United Kingdom), Chile
Opel	Frontera		mid-size	United Kingdom	1989–2004	
Opel	Monterey		mid-size	Japan	1991–2002	
Ora	Cherry Cat		electric compact crossover	China	2021–2023	China
Ora	iQ		electric compact crossover	China	2018–2020	China
Oshan	COS1°		mid-size crossover	China	2018–2021	China
Oshan	COS1° GT		mid-size crossover	China	2019–2021	China
Oshan	COS3°		subcompact crossover	China	2019–2021	China
Oshan	COS5°		subcompact crossover	China	2019–2022	China
Oshan	CX70		mid-size crossover	China	2016–2020	China
Oshan	X70A		mid-size crossover	China	2017–2022	China
Oshan	X5/ X5 Plus		compact crossover	China	2020–2024	China
Oshan	X7/ X7 Plus		mid-size crossover	China	2019–2024	China
Oshan	Z6		compact crossover	China	2021–2024	China
Perodua	Kembara		subcompact crossover	Japan	1998–2007	Malaysia
Perodua	Nautica		subcompact crossover	Japan	2008–2009	Malaysia
Peugeot	4007		compact crossover	France	2007–2012	Australia, Argentina, Czech republic, Germany, New Zealand, Russia, Slovakia and Ukraine
Peugeot	4008		compact crossover	France	2012–2017	Australia, Argentina, Czech republic, Germany, New Zealand, Russia, Slovakia and Ukraine
Peugeot	508 RXH		hybrid luxury mid-size crossover	France	2010–2018	Europe, South Africa, China, Australia, New Zealand
Phoenix Motorcars	SUV		electric compact crossover	South Korea	2010	United States
Phoenix Motorcars	SUT		electric compact SUT	South Korea	2008–2018	United States
Plymouth	Trail Duster		mid-size	United States	1974–1981	
Pontiac	Aztek		mid-size crossover	Mexico	2001–2005	
Pontiac	Vibe		sport compact crossover	United States	2002–2009	
Pontiac	Torrent		mid-size crossover	Canada	2005–2009	
Porsche	597		military mini	Western Germany	1954–1958	
Premier	RiO		subcompact	China	2006–2016	India
Qoros	3 City SUV		subcompact crossover	China	2015–2019	China, Europe
Qoros	5		compact crossover	China	2016–2020	China, Europe
Qoros	7		mid-size crossover	China	2020–2022	China
Rayton-Fissore	Rayton Fissore Magnum 4x4		compact	Italy	1984–2003	
Renault	Kadjar		compact crossover	France	2015–2022	Europe, Asia
Renault	Kaptur		subcompact crossover	France	2016–2023	Russia
Renault	Rodeo		mini	France	1970–1987	
Renault	Sandero Stepway		subcompact crossover	France-Romania	2008–2025	Brazil
Renault	QM6		compact crossover/luxury compact crossover	France	2016–2025	South Korea
Renault Samsung	QM5		compact crossover/luxury compact crossover	France	2008–2016	South Korea
Renault Samsung	QM3		subcompact crossover	France	2013–2019	South Korea
Renault Samsung	XM3		compact crossover	France	2020–2024	South Korea
Rely	X5		compact crossover	China	2009–2012	China, South Korea
Rising Auto	Marvel R		electric compact crossover	China	2020–2022	China
Roewe	D5X		plug-in hybrid compact crossover	China	2024–2026	China
Roewe	Jing		mid-size crossover coupe	China	2022–2023	China
Roewe	Marvel X		electric compact crossover	China	2018–2021	China
Roewe	RX3		subcompact crossover	China	2017–2023	China
Roewe	RX5		compact crossover	China	2016–2026	China
Roewe	RX8		mid-size	China	2018–2023	China
Roewe	RX9		mid-size crossover	China	2023–2025	China
Roewe	W5		luxury mid-size crossover	China	2011–2017	China
Ruf	Dakara		luxury sport mid-size crossover	Germany	2009	Europe
Saab	9-7X		luxury mid-size	United States	2005–2009	
Saab	9-4X		luxury mid-size crossover	Mexico	2011	
Santana	300/350		mini	Spain	1999–2009	
Santana	PS-10		mini, compact	Spain	2002–2007	
Saturn	Vue		mid-size crossover	United States, Mexico (after 2007)	2001–2009	
Saturn	Outlook		full-size crossover	United States	2006–2010	
SEAT	Ateca		compact crossover	Spain	2016–2026	Europe
SEAT	Tarraco		mid-size crossover	Spain	2018–2024	Europe
Sehol	E20X		electric subcompact crossover	China	2018–2022	China
Senia	R7		subcompact crossover	China	2015–2018	China
Senia	R9		compact crossover	China	2017–2019	China
Senia	S80		compact crossover	China	2010–2016	China
Senova	X25		subcompact crossover	China	2015–2019	China
Senova	X35		subcompact crossover	China	2016–2020	China
Senova	X55		compact crossover	China	2015–2020	China
Senova	X65		compact crossover	China	2014–2017	China
Shuanghuan	Laiwang		mid-size crossover	China	1998–2003	China
Shuanghuan	Laibao		mid-size crossover	China	2003–2010	China
Shuanghuan	SCEO		mid-size crossover	China	2005–2011	China, Europe
Singulato	iS6		battery electric mid-size crossover	China	2019–2023	China
Sinpar/ Renault	Renault 4 Plein-Air		mini	France	1961–1980	
Škoda	Kamiq (China)		subcompact crossover	Czech Republic	2018–2026	China
Škoda	Kamiq GT		subcompact crossover	Czech Republic	2019–2026	China
Škoda	Kodiaq GT		mid-size crossover coupe	Czech Republic	2018–2026	China
Škoda	type 973 Babeta		military mini	Czechoslovakia	1952–1956	
Škoda	Yeti		compact crossover	Czech Republic	2009–2017	worldwide, except North America
Sovamag	TS10		military mini	France	1984–2005	
Soueast	DX3		subcompact crossover	China	2016–2023	China
Soueast	DX5		compact crossover	China	2019–2023	China
Soueast	DX7		mid-size crossover	China	2015–2023	China
Soueast	V Cross		compact crossover	China	2014–2020	China
SsangYong	Kyron		luxury mid-size crossover	South Korea	2005–2014	worldwide, except Japan and South America
SsangYong	Musso		mid-size	South Korea	1993–2005	
Stoewer	Stoewer R180 Special/R200/typ 40		military mid-size	Germany	1936–1943	
Subaru	Exiga Crossover 7		mid-size	Japan	2013–2018	Japan
Subaru	Tribeca		mid-size crossover	United States	2005–2014	North America, Europe
Suzuki	Sidekick		mini	Canada	1988–1998	
Suzuki	X-90		mini coupe	Japan	1995–1997	
Suzuki	XL-7/XL7		mid-size	Japan	1998–2009	
SWM	X7		compact crossover	China	2016–2019	China
TagAZ	Ropad Parthner		mid-size	South Korea	2008–2011	Russia
TagAZ	Tager		subcompact	South Korea	2008–2014	Russia
TagAZ	Tiggo		compact crossover	China	2005–2014	Russia
Tata	Aria		mid-size crossover	India	2010–2016	South Asia, Europe, South East Asia, Africa, Middle East, South America
Tata	Hexa		full-size crossover	India	2017–2020	South Asia
Tata	Sumo		compact	India	1994–2018	South Asia
Tata	Sumo Grande		compact	India	2008–2019	South Asia, Africa
Tesla	Model X		electric luxury mid-size crossover	United States	2015–2026	worldwide
Thales Australia	Hawkei		military full-size	Australia	2016–2022	Australia
Toyota	Etios Crossover		subcompact crossover	Japan	2010–2023	India, South Africa, Brazil
Toyota	FJ Cruiser		mid-size	Japan	2006–2022	worldwide
Toyota	ist/Urban Cruiser		subcompact crossover	Japan	2002–2016	Japan, Australia, New Zealand, Europe
Toyota	RAV4 EV		electric compact crossover	Japan	1997–2003; 2012–2014	
Traum	Meet3		compact crossover	China	2018–2021	China
Traum	S70		mid-size crossover	China	2017–2021	China
Traum	SEEK5		mid-size crossover	China	2018–2021	China
Troller	T4		subcompact	Brazil	1997–2021	Latin America, Africa
Trumpchi	GE3		electric subcompact crossover	China	2017–2020	China
Trumpchi	GS4 Coupe		compact crossover coupe	China	2019–2023	China
Trumpchi	GS4 Plus		compact crossover	China	2021–2025	China
Trumpchi	GS5		compact crossover	China	2011–2025	worldwide
Trumpchi	GS5 Super		compact crossover	China	2014–2018	China
Trumpchi	GS7 /GS8S		mid-size crossover	China	2017–2021	China
UAZ	UAZ Simbir		mid-size	Russia	2000–2005	
Vauxhall	Antara		compact crossover	United Kingdom	2006–2015	United Kingdom
Vauxhall	Crossland		subcompact crossover	United Kingdom	2017–2024	United Kingdom
Venucia	T70		compact crossover	China	2015–2020	China
Venucia	T90		mid-size crossover	China	2016–2022	China
VinFast	LUX SA2.0		Sport utility vehicle	Vietnam	2019–2022	Vietnam
VinFast	President		Sport utility vehicle	Vietnam	2020–2022	Vietnam
Volkswagen	CrossFox/Fox Xtreme		mini SUV	Germany	2003–2021	worldwide
Volkswagen	Iltis		military and civilian mini	West Germany	1974–1988	
Volkswagen	Tiguan Allspace		mid-size crossover	Germany	2017–2024	worldwide
Volkswagen	Tiguan X		compact crossover coupe	Germany	2020–2026	China
Volkswagen	Touareg		luxury executive crossover	Germany	2002–2026	worldwide
Volvo	PV800 Series		military mid-size	Sweden	1944–1946	
Volvo	TP21		military mid-size	Sweden	1953–1958	
Volvo	XC70		luxury mid-size crossover	Sweden	1997–2016	worldwide
Weiwang	S50		luxury compact crossover	China	2016–2017	China
Weltmeister	EX5		electric compact SUV	China	2018–2022	China
Weltmeister	EX6		electric mid-size SUV	China	2019–2022	China
Weltmeister	W6		electric mid-size SUV	China	2021–2022	China
Wey	Macchiato		luxury compact crossover	China	2021–2023	China
Wey	VV5		luxury compact crossover	China	2017–2021	China
Wey	VV6		luxury compact crossover	China	2018–2021	China
Wey	VV7		luxury mid-size crossover	China	2017–2021	China
Wey	P8		luxury mid-size crossover	China	2017–2020	China
Willys	Willys MA		military mini	United States	1940–1941	
Willys	Willys MB		military mini	United States	1941–1945	
Willys	Willys CJ		mini	United States	1944–1964	
Willys	Willys Jeep Station Wagon		compact	United States	1946–1965	
Willys	Willys-Overland Jeepster		mini convertible	United States	1948–1950	
Willys	Willys M38		military mini	United States	1949–1952	
Willys	Willys M38A1		military mini	United States	1952–1971	
Xiali	N7		subcompact crossover	China	2013–2019	China
XPeng	G3		electric compact crossover	China	2018–2023	China
Yema	F10		compact crossover	China	2001–2007	China
Yema	F12		mid-size crossover	China	2001–2007	China
Yema	F16		mid-size crossover	China	2011–2017	China
Yema	T60		subcompact crossover	China	2019–2023	China
Yema	T70		compact crossover	China	2015–2019	China
Yema	T80		compact crossover	China	2017–2020	China
Youngman-Lotus	T5		mid-size crossover	China	2013	China
Yuanhang	H8		electric mid-size crossover	China	2023–2024	China
Yuanhang	H9		electric mid-size crossover	China	2024	China
Yudo	π1		electric subcompact crossover	China	2018–2023	China
Yudo	π3		electric subcompact crossover	China	2018–2022	China
Zedriv	GX5		electric subcompact crossover	China	2020	China
Zinoro	1E		compact hybrid crossover	China	2015–2016	China
Zinoro	60H		compact hybrid crossover	China	2017–2020	China
Zotye	2008		subcompact crossover	China	2005–2016	China, Middle East, Africa
Zotye	5008		subcompact crossover	China	2005–2016	China
Zotye	Domy X5		compact crossover	China	2015–2021	China
Zotye	Domy X7		midsize crossover	China	2016–2021	China
Zotye	SR7		compact crossover	China	2016–2021	China
Zotye	SR9		mid-size crossover	China	2016–2019	China
Zotye	T200		subcompact crossover	China	2005–2016	China
Zotye	T300		subcompact crossover	China	2016–2021	China
Zotye	T500		compact crossover	China	2017–2021	China
Zotye	T600		compact crossover	China	2013–2020	China
Zotye	T700		mid-size crossover	China	2017–2021	China
Zotye	T800		mid-size crossover	China	2018–2021	China
ZX	Admiral		mid-size crossover	China	2000–2010	China
ZX	C3 Urban Ark		subcompact crossover	China	2013–2021	China
ZX	Landmark		mid-size crossover	China	2006–2013	China, Europe, Africa
