= Eterniti Motors =

Eterniti Motors Limited
- Founded: 1 September 2010
- Defunct: 1 February 2014
- Fate: Dissolved
- Headquarters: United Kingdom
- Number of locations: London
- Area served: International
- Services: Automobile manufacturing
- Website: www.eternitimotors.com

Eterniti Motors was a short-lived British company founded in 2010 and placed in administration in January 2014.

It unveiled its first and only car, the Hemera, at the 2011 Frankfurt Motor Show. In 2012 the Hemera was shown in China at the Beijing International Automotive Exhibition as the Artemis.

== Models ==
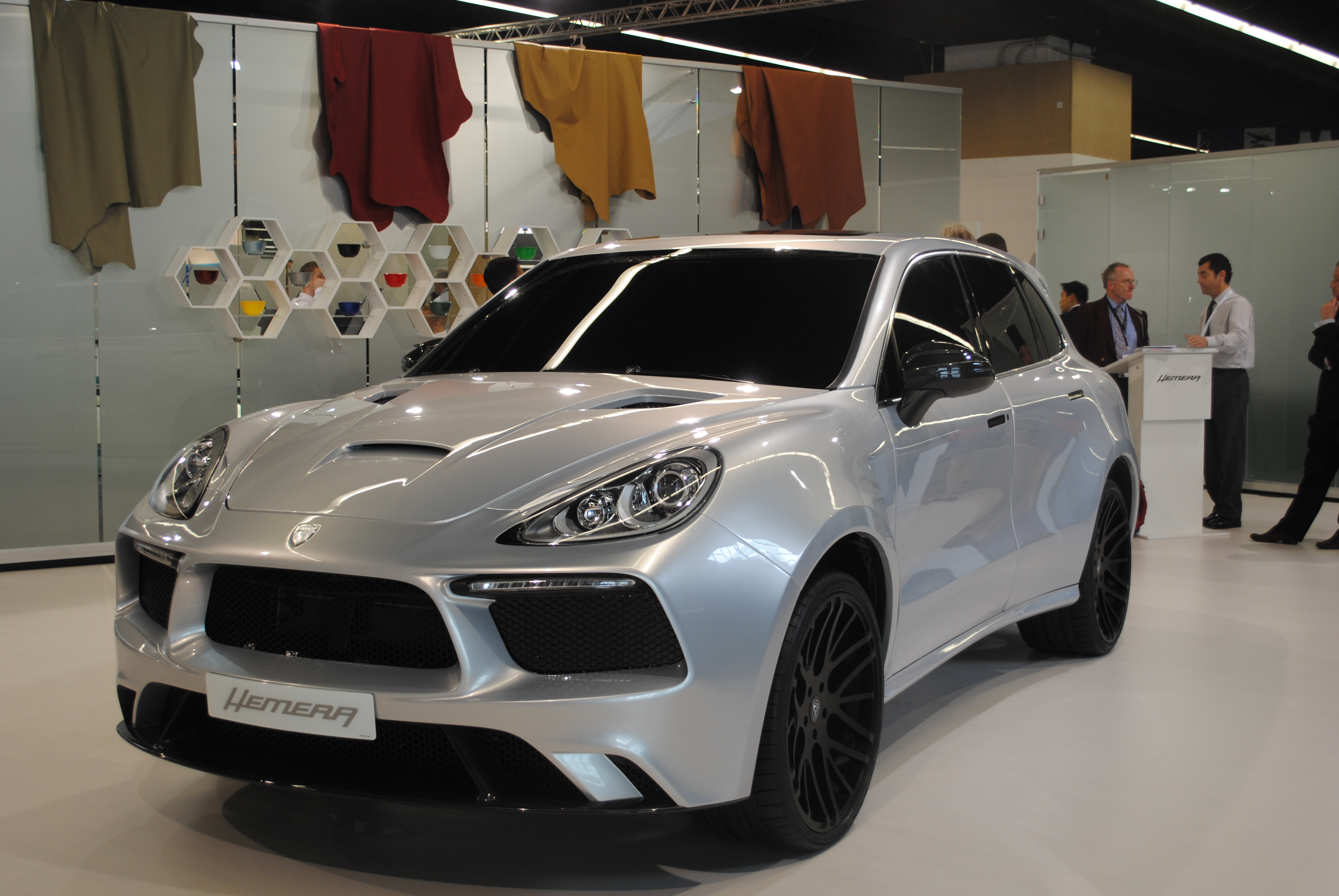
Eterniti Hemera

Initially called the Hemera, Eterniti Motor's only vehicle was renamed Artemis when shown at the 2012 Beijing Motor Show. The Artemis features a Porsche 4.8-litre twin-turbocharged V8, producing 591 bhp (441 kW; 599 PS) and 553 lb⋅ft (750 N⋅m) of torque, resulting in a claimed a 0-62 mph time of 4.2 seconds and a top speed of 180 mph (289.7 km/h).

The Artemis has been named the world’s first Super-SUV, extensively modifying the Porsche Cayenne with new carbon composite body panels and ultra-low profile 315/25 tyres that sit on large 23" super-lightweight forged alloy rims. The standard specification features twin electric reclining seats in the rear, a choice of starlight roof lining or panoramic glass roof, quilted undercarpets and boot trim, lambswool rugs, electronic-reveal iPads, and a drinks chiller.

== Company history ==
The company is formally registered as Eterniti Motors Limited and was registered in September 2010. Its first public announcement was not until 16 August 2011. Eterniti Motors is backed by a group of international investors with collective experience in high-level luxury automobiles. The company listed Alastair Macqueen, a former XJ220 developer as its Chief Engineer, Tim Sugden as interim General Manager, and Mark Carbery formerly of Lexus as Head of Brand and Communications. Former Formula One driver Johnny Herbert was briefly mentioned as developing and promoting the vehicle.

== See also ==
- List of companies based in London
- List of car manufacturers of the United Kingdom
