= Zotye T500 =

Compact SUV

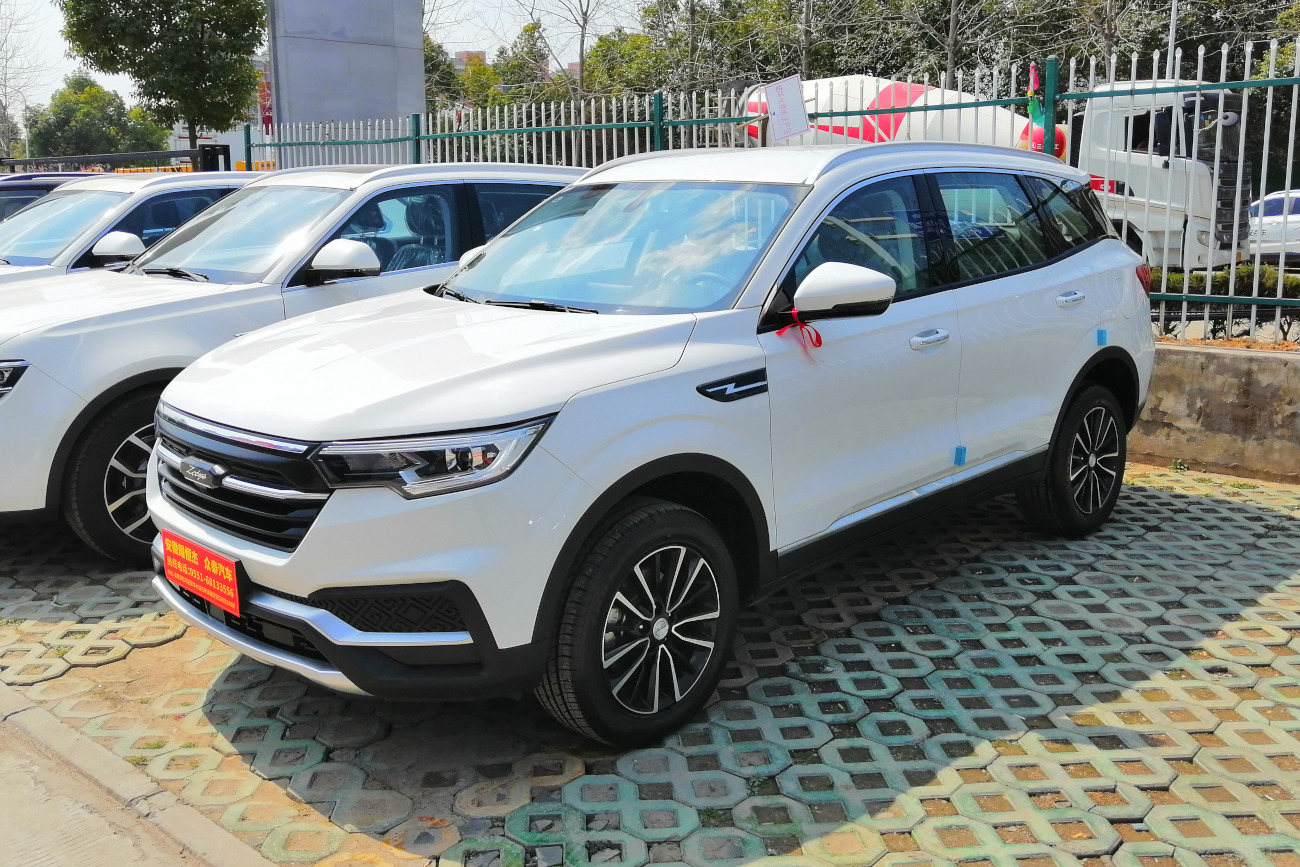

Overview
- Manufacturer: Zotye
- Production: 2017–2021
- Model years: 2018–2021
- Assembly: China

Body and chassis
- Class: Compact crossover SUV (C)
- Body style: 5-door SUV
- Layout: Front-engine, front-wheel-drive layout

Powertrain
- Engine: Petrol: 1.5 L TNN4G15T I4 turbo; 1.6 L TNN4G16A I4
- Transmission: 5-speed manual; 6-speed automatic

Dimensions
- Wheelbase: 2,700 mm (106.3 in)
- Length: 4,632 mm (182.4 in)
- Width: 1,850 mm (72.8 in)
- Height: 1,695 mm (66.7 in)
- Curb weight: 1,427–1,560 kg (3,146.0–3,439.2 lb)

The Zotye T500 is a compact crossover SUV which produced by Zotye Auto that debuted during the 2017 Shanghai Auto Show.

== Overview ==
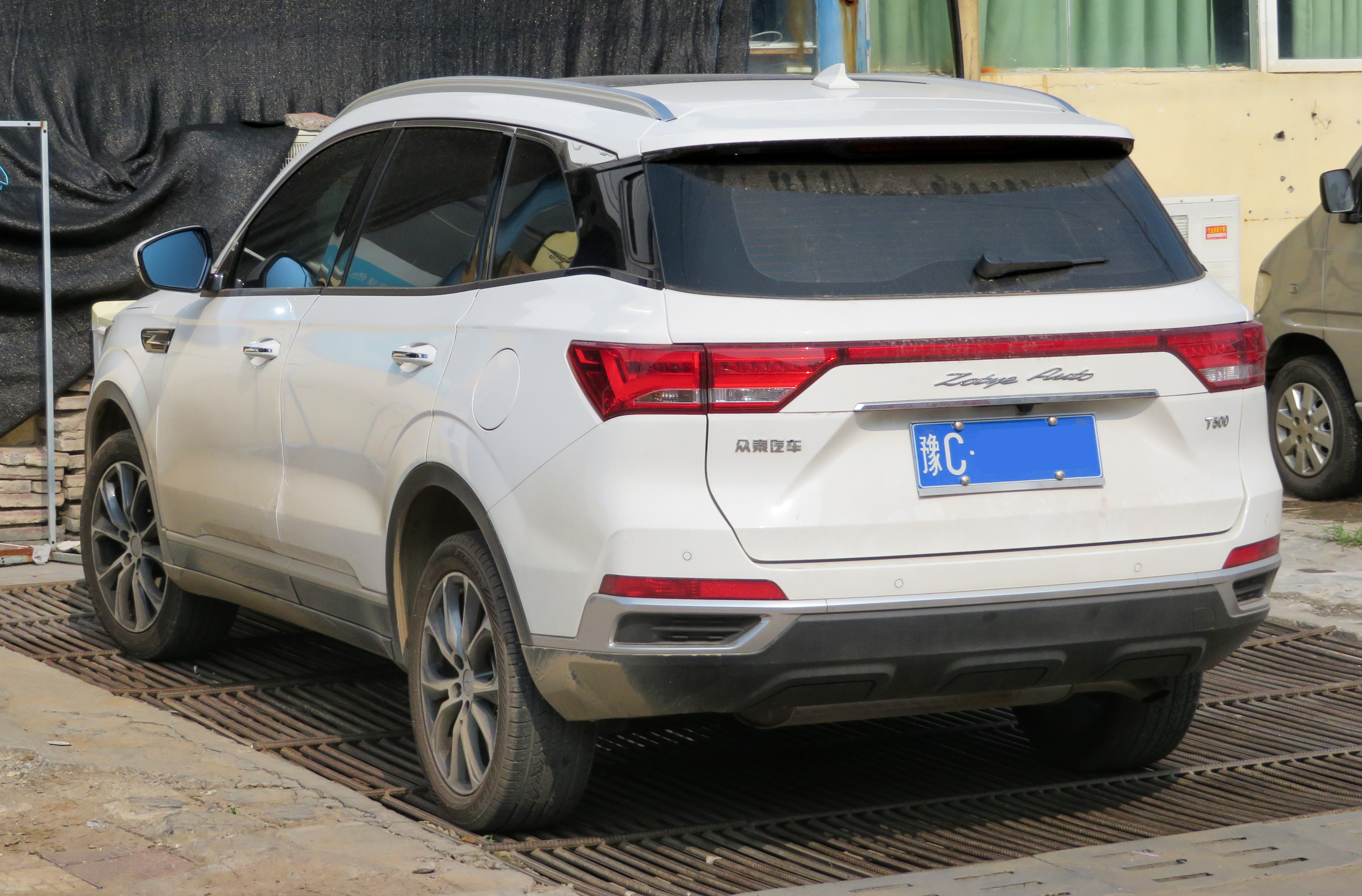
Rear view

The power of the Zotye T500 CUV comes from a 1.5 liter turbo engine producing 156 hp and mated to a five-speed manual gearbox.

The production T500 model debuted in March 2018. Pricing of the T500 ranges from 78,800 yuan to 149,800 yuan.
