= Knight XV =

Overview
- Manufacturer: Conquest Vehicles
- Production: 2008–present Limited to 100 vehicles
- Assembly: Toronto, Ontario

Body and chassis
- Class: Full-size luxury SUV
- Body style: 5-door SUV
- Layout: Front-engine, 4x2-wheel drive 4x4-wheel drive also available
- Floor type: Steel

Powertrain
- Engine: Ford 6.7L Power Stroke, V8 Turbo diesel engine or Gasoline Ford 6.8L, V10
- Transmission: 5-speed TorqShift automatic

Dimensions
- Wheelbase: 153 in (3,886 mm)
- Length: 239.6 in (6,086 mm)
- Width: 96 in (2,438 mm)
- Height: 100 in (2,540 mm)
- Curb weight: 13,000 lb (5,897 kg)

The Knight XV (Xtreme Vehicle) is an armored SUV produced in limited quantities by Conquest Vehicles. Unveiled at the 2008 Specialty Equipment Market Association (SEMA) in Las Vegas, Nevada, it is Conquest Vehicles' flagship product. According to the manufacturer, the vehicle takes approximately 4,000 hours to build at its production facility in Toronto, Ontario, Canada.

== Specifications ==
The vehicle is 20 feet (6.1 m) long, 8.2 feet (2.5 m) wide, and 8.3 feet (2.5 m) tall, with a ground clearance of 14 inches (360 mm). It has a wheelbase of 12.8 feet (3.9 m) and a curb weight of 13,000 pounds (5,900 kg). The vehicle holds up to 63 US gallons (240 L; 52 imp gal) of fuel to power the engine. The gasoline engine provides 325 hp (242 kW) and 400 pound-feet (540 N⋅m) of torque, while the diesel model offers 300 hp (220 kW) and 660 pound-feet (890 N⋅m) of torque. The chassis sits on Continental MPT 80 tires mounted on 20-inch rims (51 cm). The Knight XV seats six people: two in the front and four in the back (consisting of two rear-facing and two forward-facing seats).

== Features ==
The Knight XV includes a built-in oxygen survival kit, an under-vehicle magnetic attachment (e.g. GPS trackers) detection system, multiple armor levels, and a black box system. The vehicle's armor is primarily made of ballistic steel, with fiberglass fenders and bumpers. The interior features carpeting, leather upholstery, a television, satellite system, LED lighting, various radios (and rear-mounted antenna), music playback systems, a tandem sunroof, and more. It is built on the Ford F550 platform.

== Armor ==
The opaque armor is manufactured using high-strength steel, ballistic aluminum, composites, aramid, and ceramics. The front bumpers are made of steel, while the rear bumpers and fenders are made of ballistic fiberglass reinforced with Kevlar.

Official specifications for the Knight XV's body armor are not available on the company's website, and no specific armor rating has been issued. The armor is tested by ballistic armor company H.P. White. Glass and opaque armor sheets are tested with an electronic bullet-firing system, where various mechanisms test the strength and durability of the armor. The glass used in the Knight XV's windows is rated at CEN Euronorm B4+, which can stop standard ammunition for most handguns, up to .44 caliber.
