= Lifan X70 =

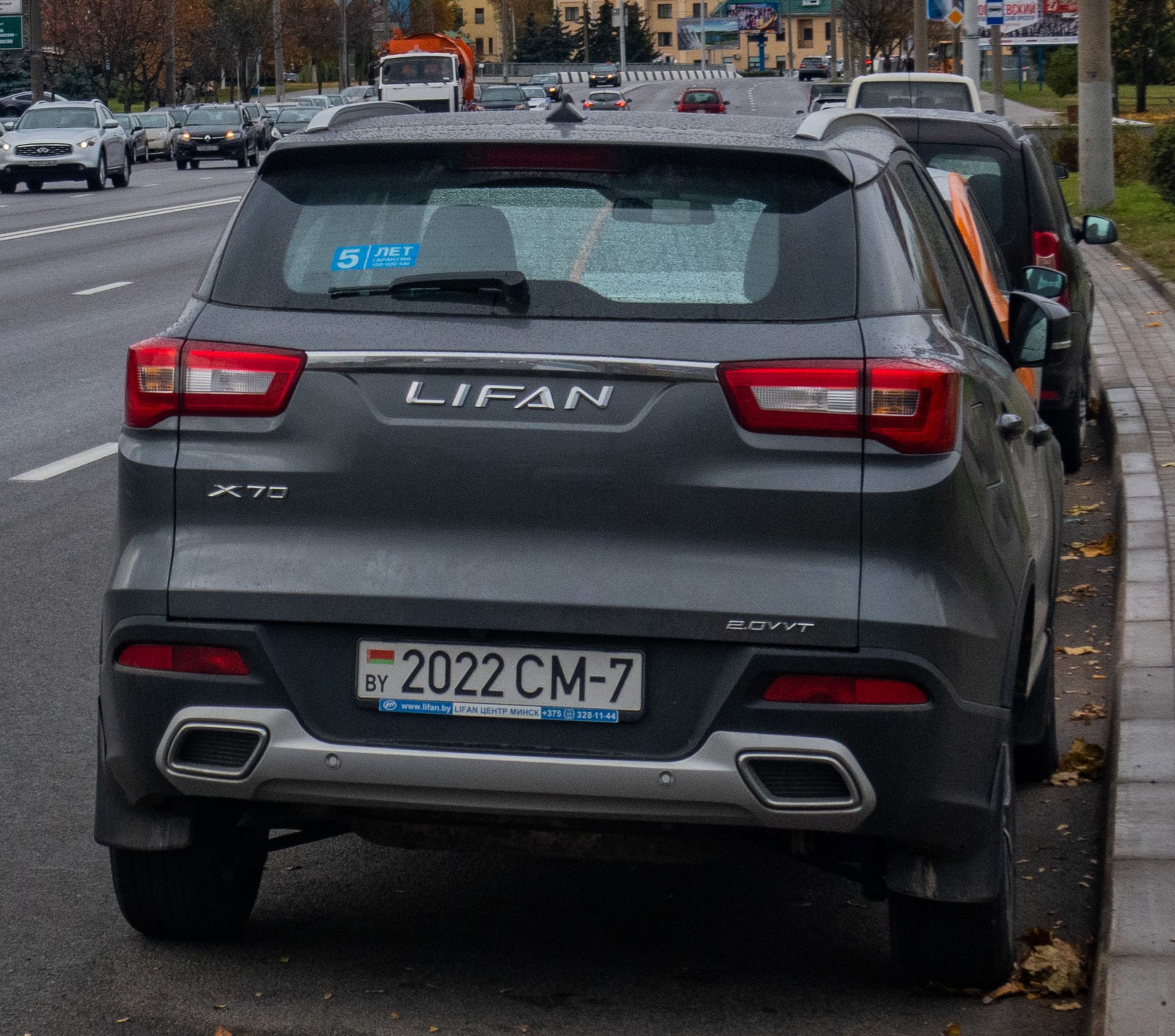

Overview
- Manufacturer: Lifan
- Also called: Lifan Pengfei
- Production: 2018–2020
- Assembly: China: Chongqing

Body and chassis
- Class: Compact crossover SUV
- Body style: 5-door SUV
- Layout: Front-engine, front-wheel-drive

Powertrain
- Engine: Petrol: 2.0 L I4
- Power output: 100 kW (134 hp; 136 PS)
- Transmission: 5-speed manual

Dimensions
- Wheelbase: 2,610 mm (102.8 in)
- Length: 4,390 mm (172.8 in)
- Width: 1,820 mm (71.7 in)
- Height: 1,715 mm (67.5 in)
- Curb weight: 1,460–1,490 kg (3,220–3,280 lb)

The Lifan X70 is a compact crossover SUV produced by the Chinese manufacturer Lifan Motors, division of Lifan Group.

== Overview ==
The vehicle was presented at the Lifan Global Dealers' Conference on 21 September 2017 in Lijiang and has been sold since spring 2018, first in Russia. Later, the vehicle was offered in China and South America.

At Auto Shanghai in April 2015, Lifan showed the X70 concept car.
