= Foton Sauvana =

Mid-size SUV

Foton Sauvana (U201)
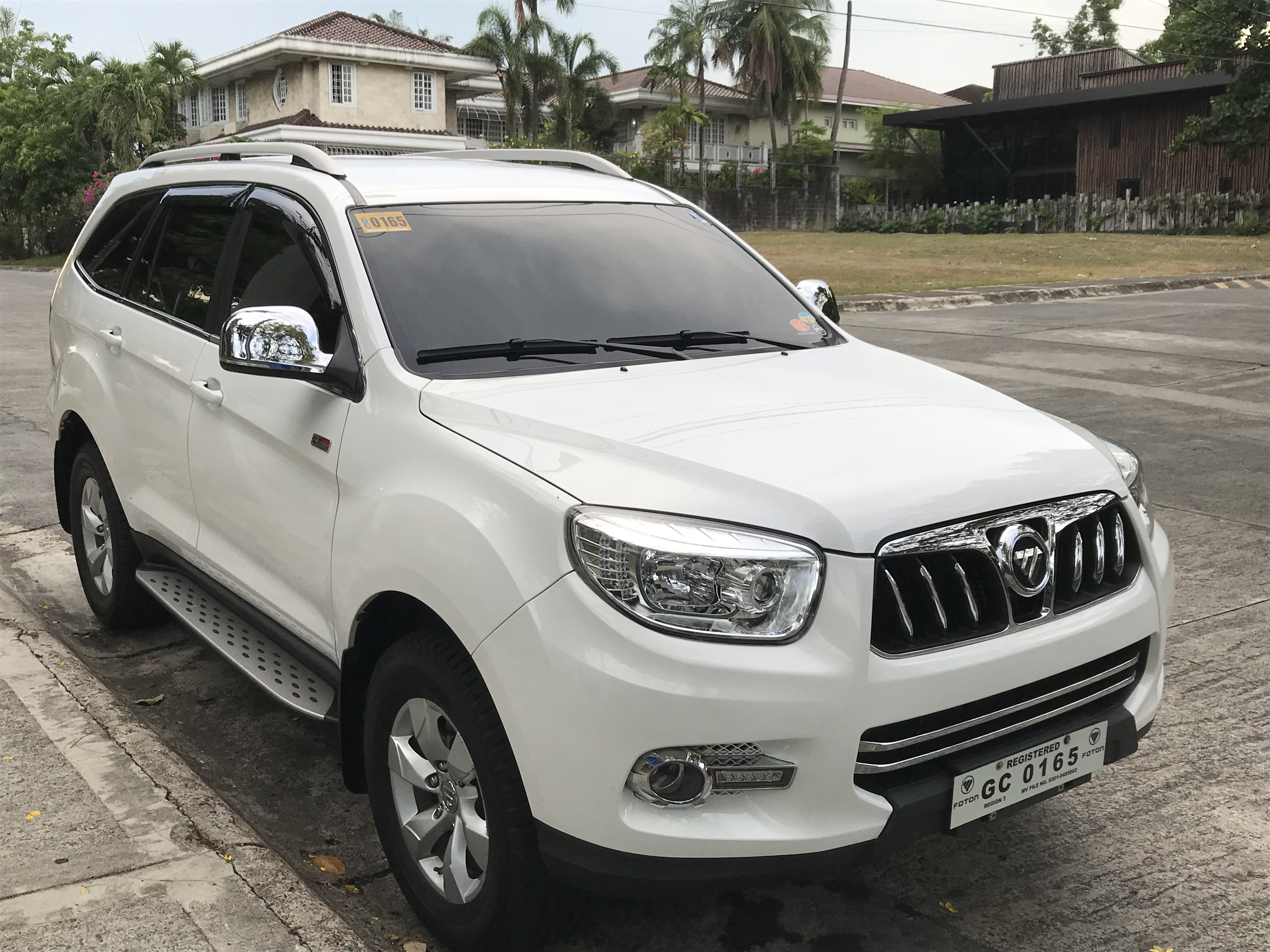

Overview
- Manufacturer: Foton Motor
- Also called: Foton Toplander (Philippines)
- Production: 2014–2021
- Model years: 2015–2021
- Assembly: China: Changping District, Beijing; Philippines: Clark, Pampanga

Body and chassis
- Class: Mid-size SUV
- Body style: 5-door SUV
- Layout: Front-engine rear-wheel drive / four-wheel drive

Powertrain
- Engine: 2.0 L 4G24 I4 (turbo petrol); 2.8 L Cummins ISF I4 (turbo diesel)
- Transmission: 5-speed manual; 6-speed manual; 6-speed ZF automatic

Dimensions
- Wheelbase: 2,790 mm (109.8 in)
- Length: 4,830 mm (190.2 in)
- Width: 1,910 mm (75.2 in)
- Height: 1,975 mm (77.8 in)
- Curb weight: 1,900–2,105 kg (4,189–4,641 lb)

The Foton Sauvana (Chinese: 福田萨瓦纳; pinyin: Fútián Sàwǎnà) is a mid-size SUV sold by the Chinese manufacturer Foton Motor in China. The Foton Sauvana debuted during the 2014 Guangzhou Auto Show in China.

== History ==
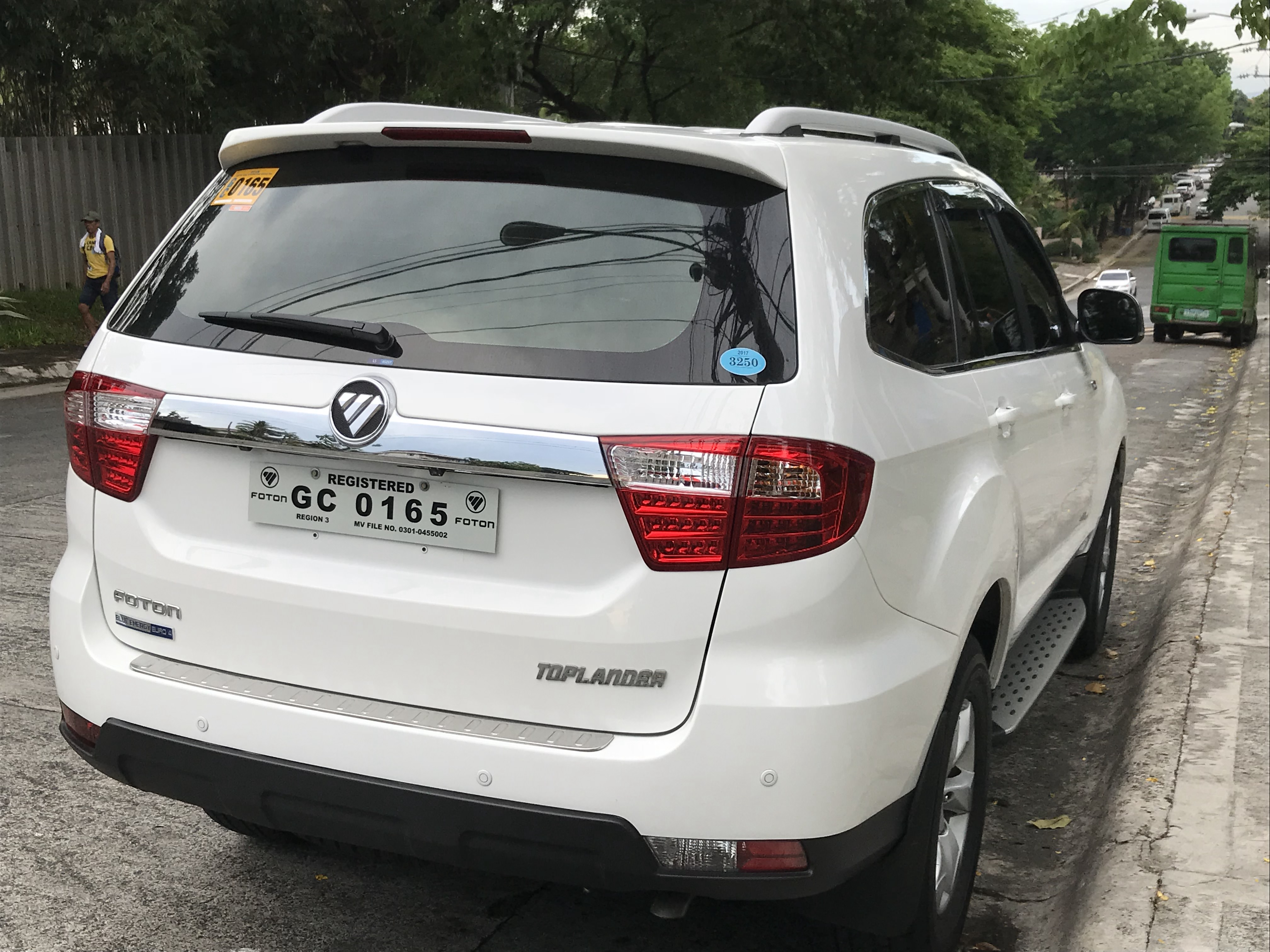
Rear view

On May 10, 2015, the Sauvana was launched in the Philippines as the Foton Toplander with a price range from PHP 998,000 and PHP 1,150,000.

On September 15, 2015, Foton reported that an evaluation was made on whether to market the Sauvana for South Africa. On September 30, 2015, Foton reported plans to market the Sauvana to North America.

On August 7, 2017, Foton returned to Australia with the Sauvana introduced as an entry model.

The Sauvana had been discontinued in 2021.

=== Design ===
The Sauvana, formerly known as the Foton U201 during the development phase, was also known as the Foton Toplander in some foreign markets, and was built as a body-on-frame SUV. Prices of the Foton Sauvana ranges from 135,300 yuan to 360,000 yuan in China.

== Powertrain ==
Power of the Foton Sauvana comes from a Mitsubishi-sourced 2.4-liter four-cylinder 4G69 petrol engine with an output of 101 kW (135 hp) and 200 N⋅m (148 lb⋅ft), mated to a five-speed manual transmission, a six-speed manual transmission, or a six-speed automatic transmission.
