= Hanteng V7 =

Chinese compact multi-purpose vehicle

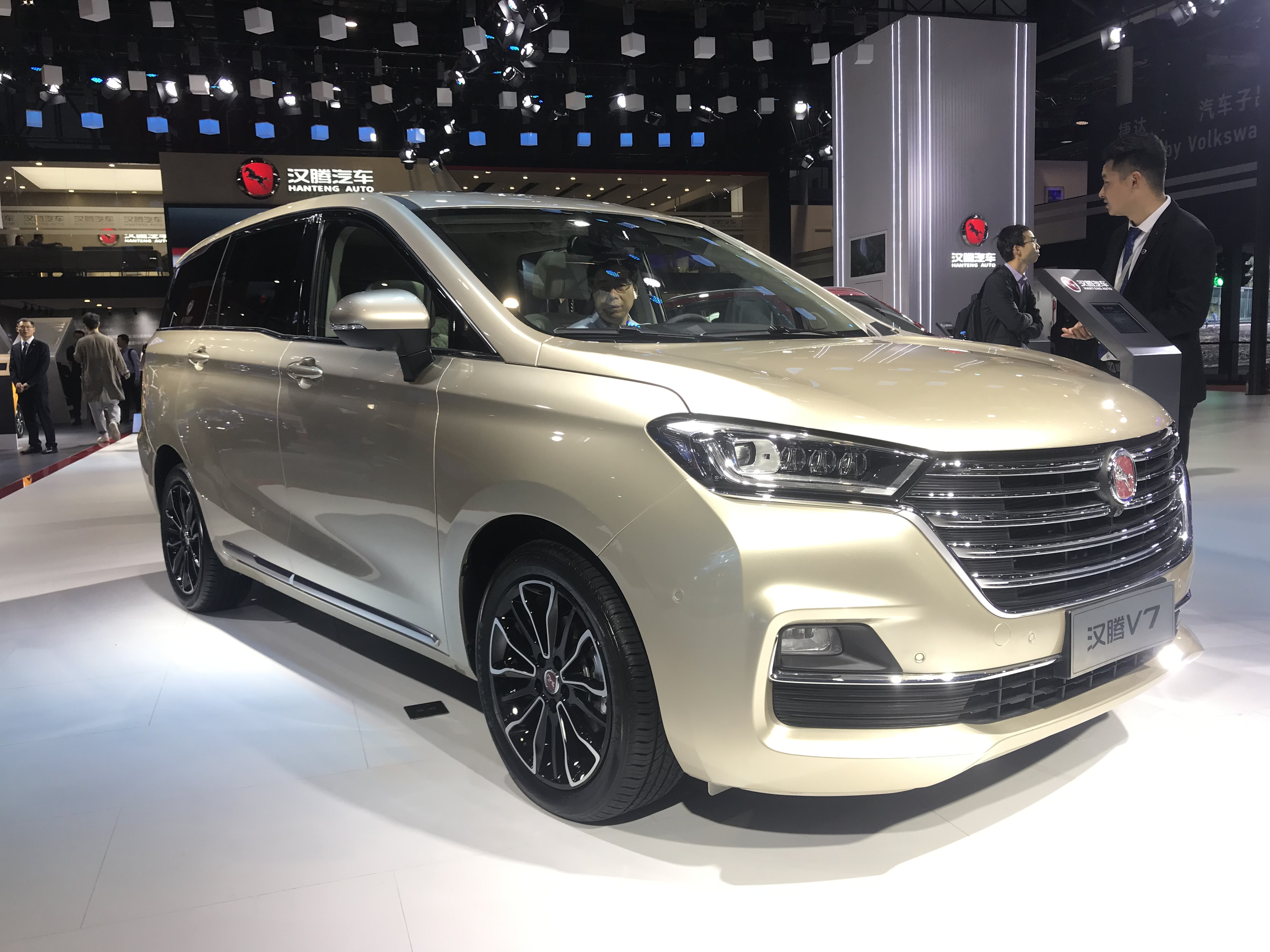

Overview
- Manufacturer: Hanteng Autos
- Production: 2019–2021
- Model years: 2019–2021

Body and chassis
- Class: Minivan (M)
- Body style: 5-door minivan
- Layout: Front-engine, front-wheel-drive

Powertrain
- Engine: 1.5L turbo I4 (gasoline)
- Transmission: 6-speed manual 6-speed automatic

Dimensions
- Wheelbase: 2,800 mm (110.2 in)
- Length: 4,826 mm (190.0 in)
- Width: 1,858 mm (73.1 in)
- Height: 1,721 mm (67.8 in)

The Hanteng V7 is a compact MPV manufactured by Hanteng Autos in China from 2019.

== Overview ==
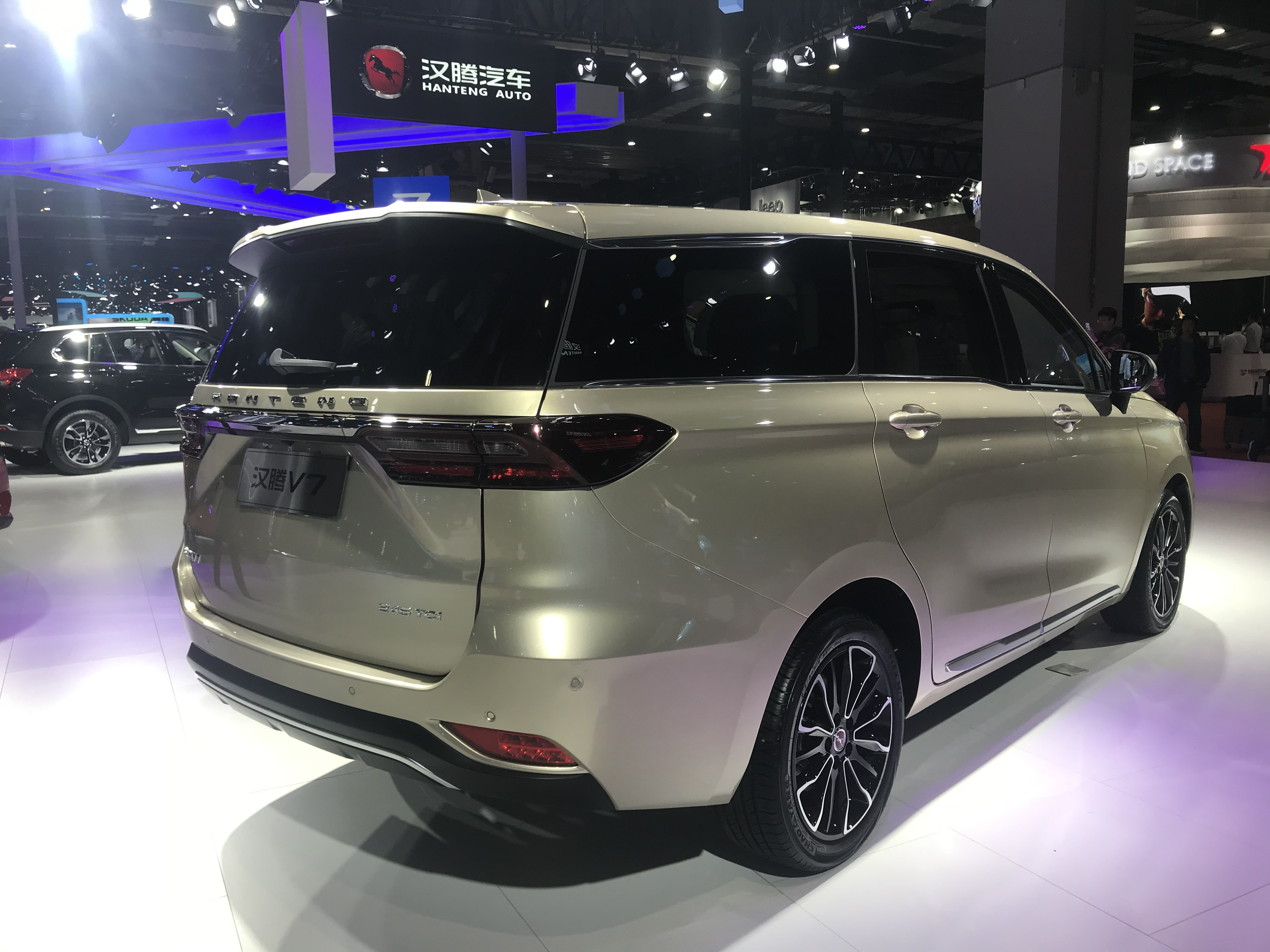
Hanteng V7 rear

In China, the Hanteng V7 is classified as a compact seven-seat MPV, competing with cars like the Trumpchi GM6, Buick GL6 and Maxus G50. The V7 was first unveiled during the 2018 Guangzhou Auto Show as a pre-production vehicle. The V7 was later showed again suring the 2019 Shanghai Auto Show with prices starting from 95,800 to 135,800 yuan (~US$13879 – US$19,674).

=== Interior ===
The interior of the Hanteng V7 is equipped with Bosch's 9.3 version of the ESP system, dual 12.3-inch full LCD, and mobile phone wireless charging. Seating configurations is available in 6-seater (2+2+2) and 7-seater (2+2+3) versions.

Technology configurations of the V7 includes ADAS driver assistance system with LDW lane departure warning, AEB active brake technology with pedestrian recognition protection, SLIF speed limit information reminder, adaptive cruising system and HBA smart high beam. The cameras offer 360 degree panoramic viewing system, BSI blind spot monitoring, TPMS tire pressure monitoring, ABS + EBD + ESP, front double airbags and passive safety configuration of side airbags and side air curtains.

=== Powertrain ===
The Hanteng V7 is powered by a 1.5-Liter turbocharged engine with a maximum power output of 154HP (115kW) and peak torque of 215 Nm. The engine is mated to a 6-speed manual transmission and a 6-speed automatic transmission.
