= Hanteng X8 =

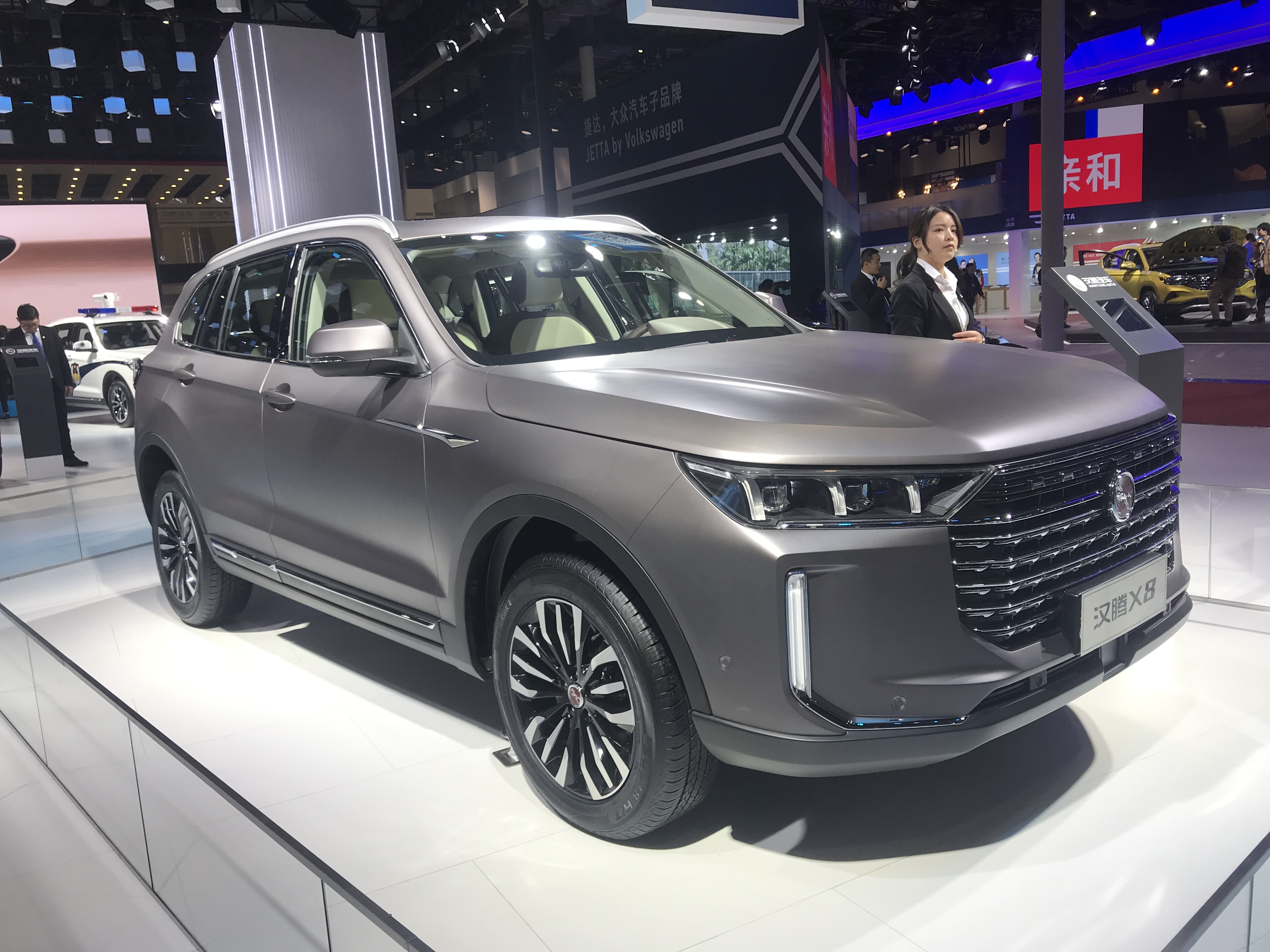
- Hanteng X8

Overview
- Manufacturer: Hanteng Autos
- Production: 2019–2021
- Model years: 2019–2021
- Assembly: Jiangxi, China

Body and chassis
- Class: mid-size CUV
- Body style: 5-door wagon
- Layout: Front-engine, front-wheel-drive

Powertrain
- Engine: 2.0 L turbo I4 (gasoline)
- Transmission: 6 speed DCT

Dimensions
- Wheelbase: 2,810 mm (110.6 in)

The Hanteng X8 is a mid-size crossover utility vehicle (CUV) produced by the Chinese manufacturer Hanteng Autos from 2019 to 2021.

== Overview ==
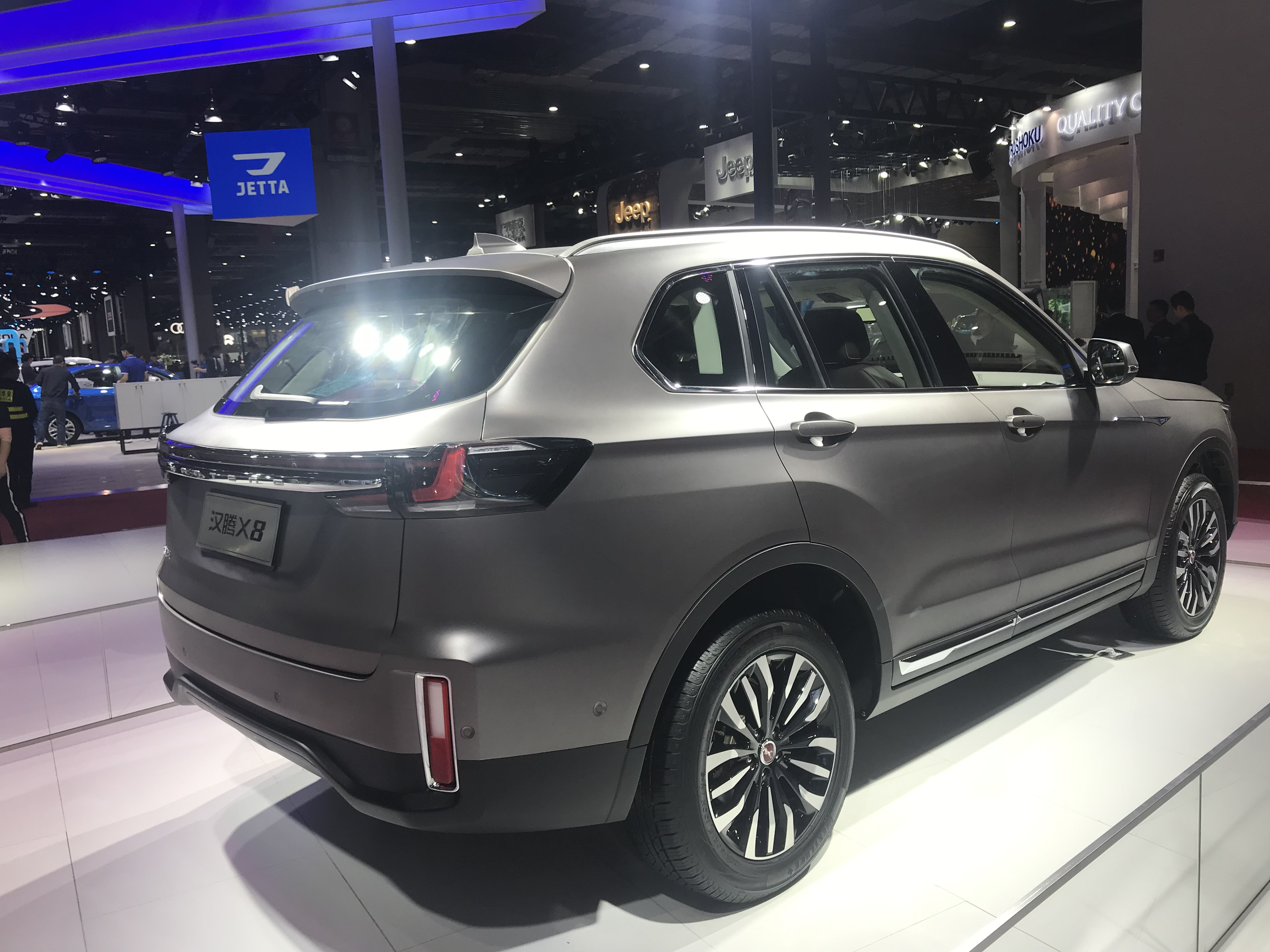
Hanteng X8 rear

The Hanteng X8 is Hanteng's largest crossover SUV product as of 2020. It was first unveiled during the 2019 Shanghai Auto Show. Being heavily based on the same platform as the slightly smaller Hanteng X7, the Hanteng X8 is powered by the same 2.0-litre turbocharged engine as the one powering the Hanteng X7, producing a maximum output of 190 hp and a peak torque of 250N.m. The engine of the Hanteng X8 is mated to the 6-speed dual-clutch transmission.
