= Hanteng X5 =

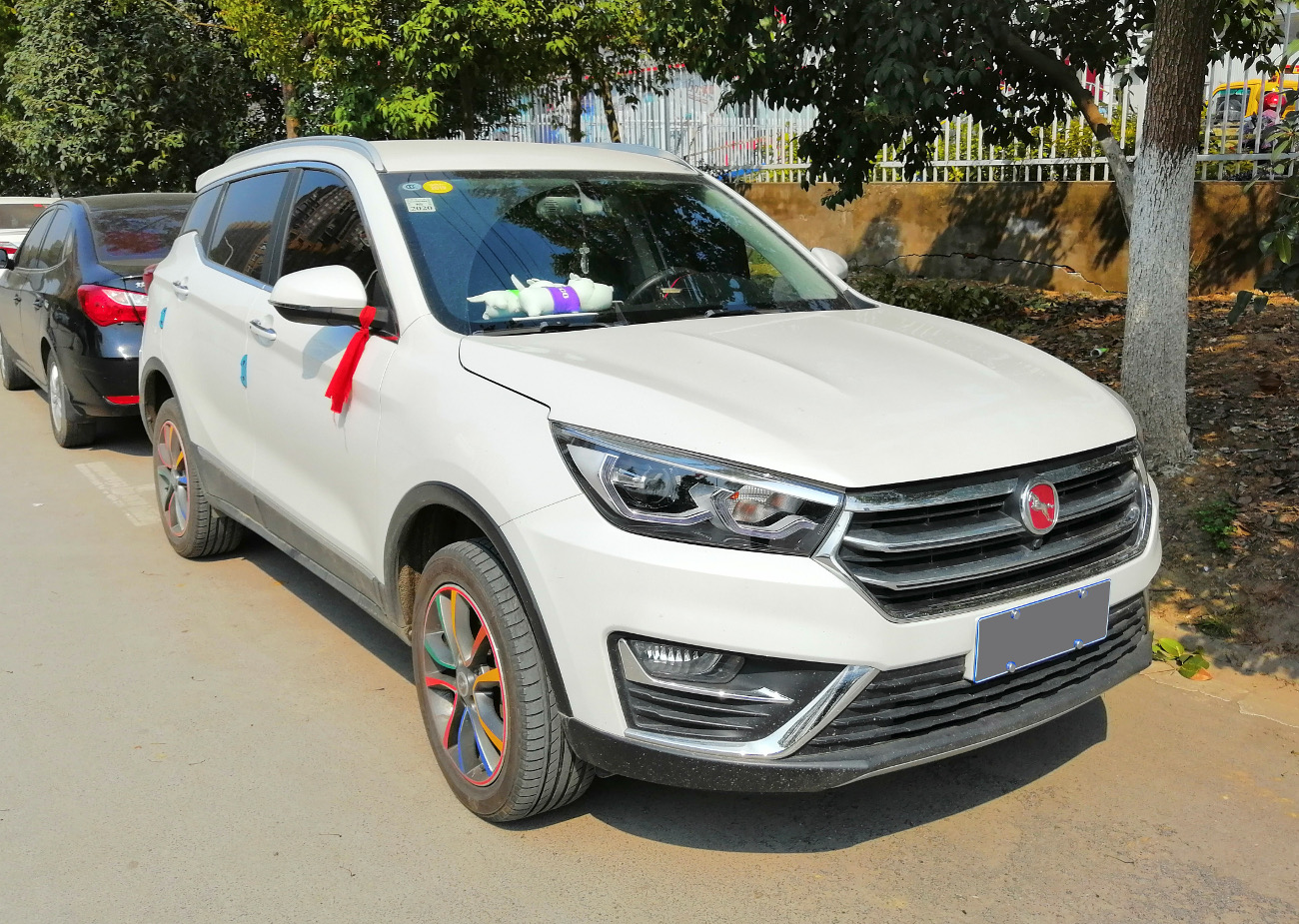

Overview
- Manufacturer: Hanteng Autos
- Production: 2016–2021
- Assembly: China: Jiangxi; Iran: Borujerd (Azim Khodro)

Body and chassis
- Class: Compact crossover SUV (C)
- Body style: 5-door SUV
- Layout: Front-engine, front-wheel-drive
- Related: Dorcen G60s

Powertrain
- Engine: Gasoline: 1.5 L I4
- Transmission: 5-speed manual; CVT

Dimensions
- Wheelbase: 2,600 mm (102.4 in)
- Length: 4,501 mm (177.2 in)
- Width: 1,820 mm (71.7 in)
- Height: 1,648 mm (64.9 in)

The Hanteng X5 is a compact crossover SUV produced by the Chinese manufacturer Hanteng Autos from 2016 until 2021.

== Overview ==
The Hanteng X5 was introduced at the 2016 Guangzhou Auto Show. The Hanteng X5 compact CUV is Hanteng's second product and is positioned under the Hanteng X7 mid-size CUV.

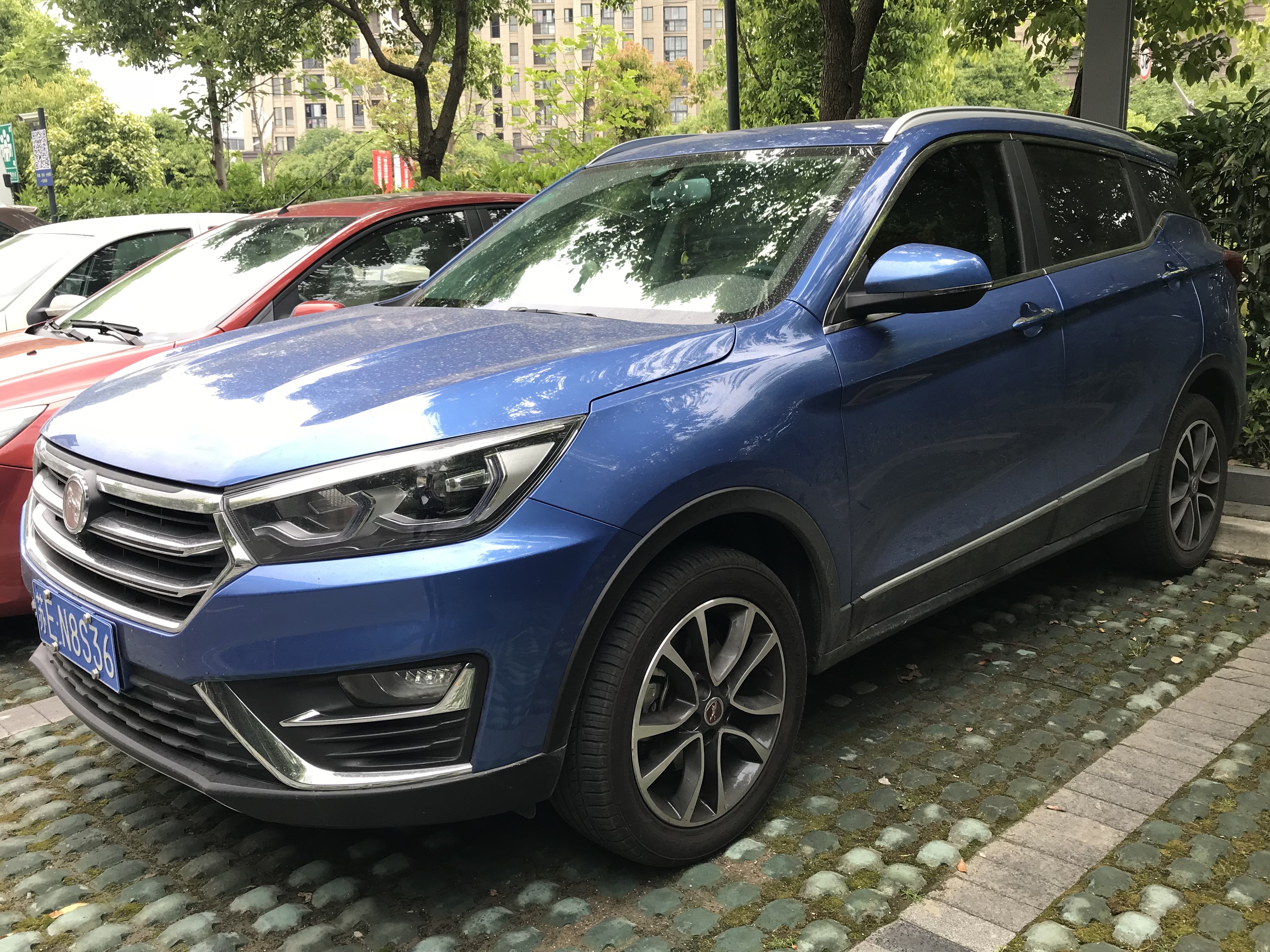
Hanteng X5 front

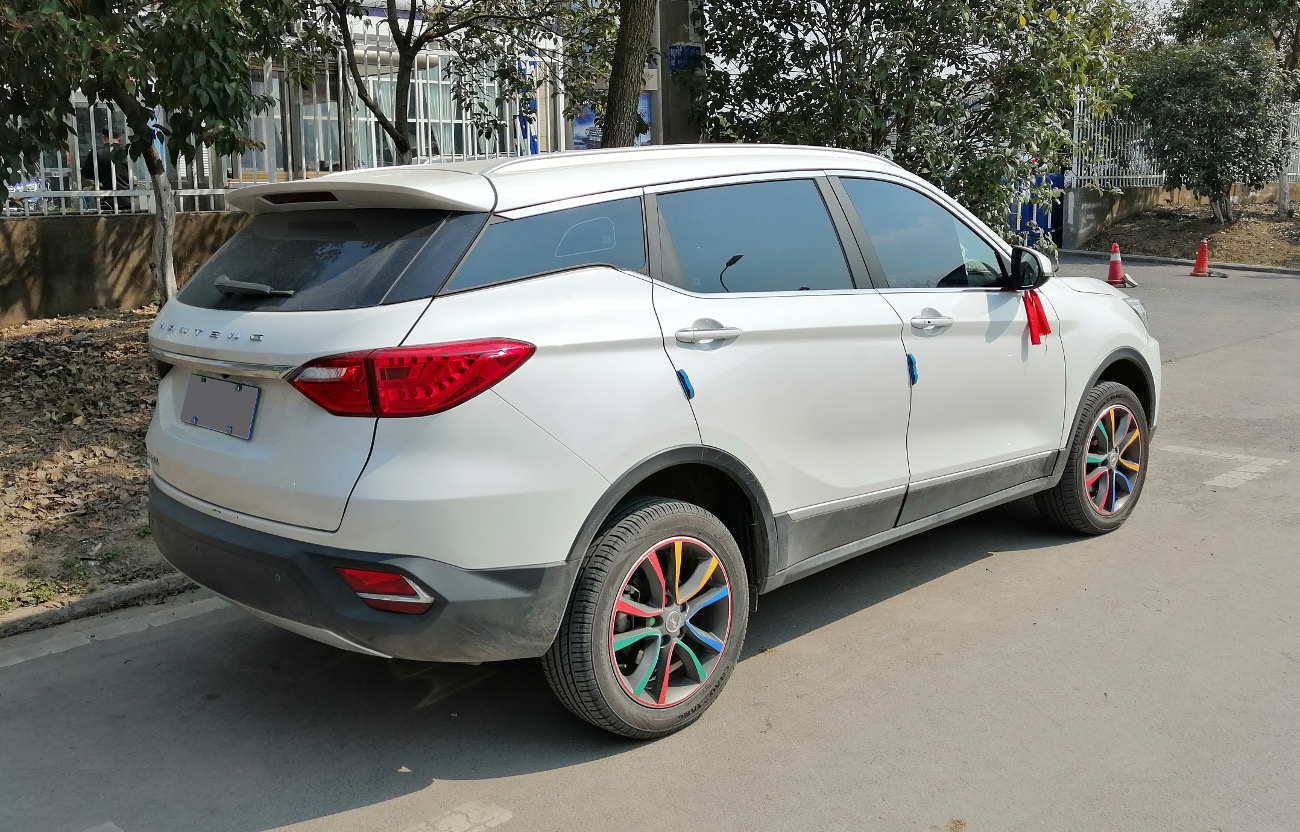
Hanteng X5 rear

A facelift for the Hanteng X5 was first launched at the Guangzhou Auto Show in 2018, later relaunched as the 2020 model that meets the China-VI-b emissions standard.

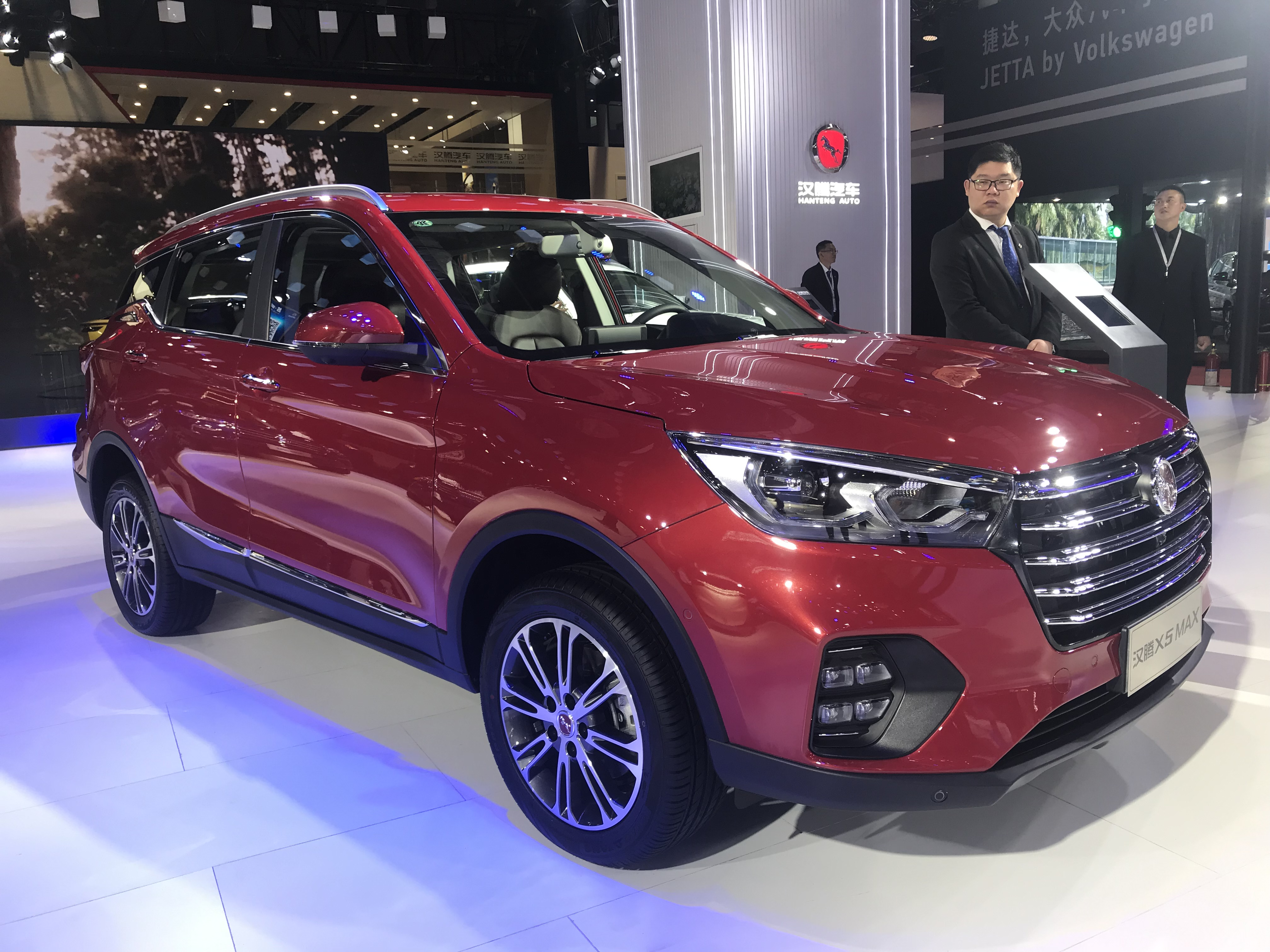
Hanteng X5 Max front

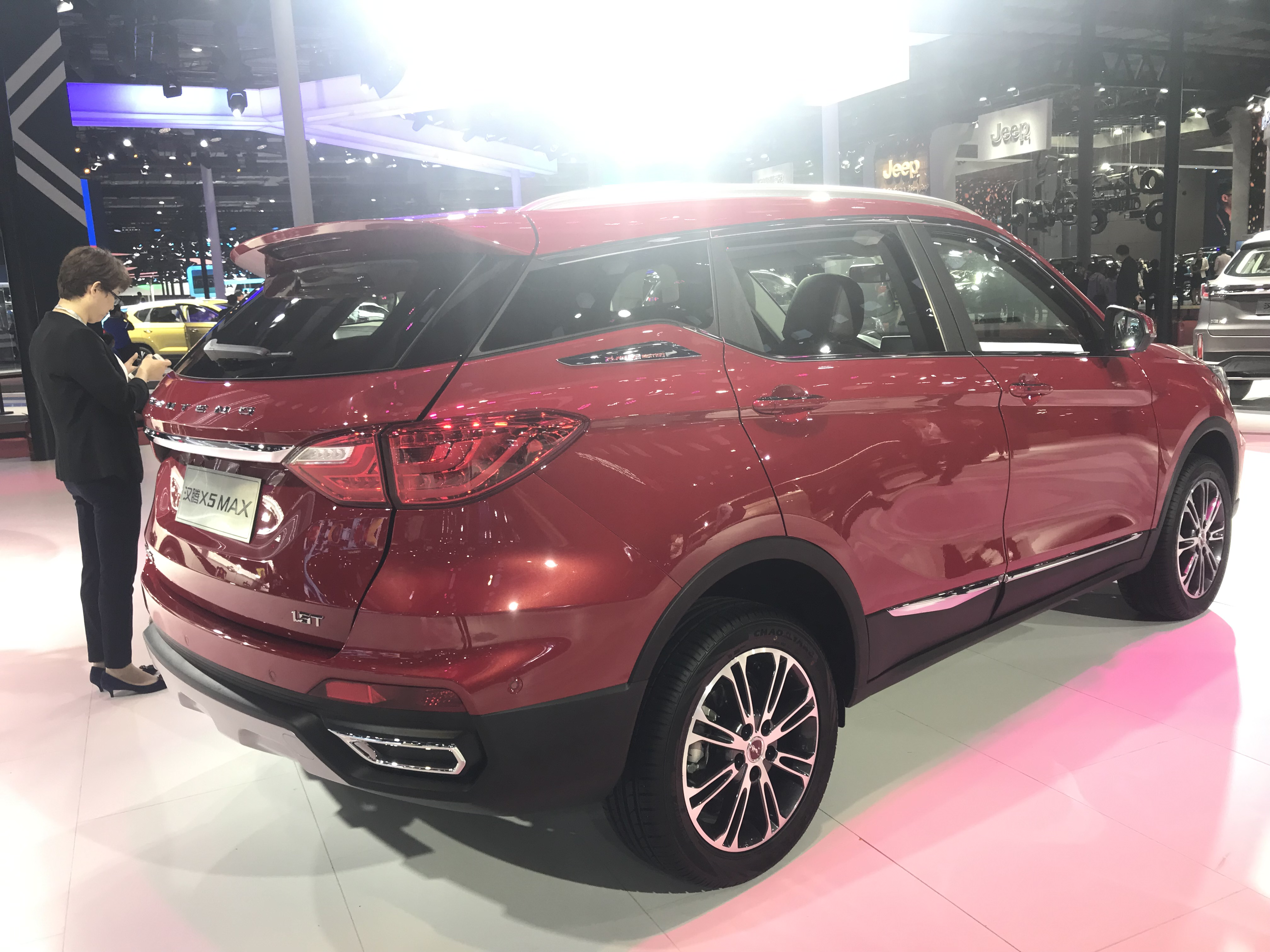
Hanteng X5 Max rear

=== Interior ===
The interior of the Hanteng X5 features a three-spoke steering wheel, an 8.8-inch (223.5-mm) floating multimedia LCD screen, as well as wood and chrome trim on the door panels and center console.

=== Powertrain ===
The Hanteng X5 is powered by a 1.5-liter turbocharged four-cylinder petrol engine with 150 hp (110 kW) and 215 Nm, mated to a five-speed manual transmission or a CVT.

== Hanteng X5 EV ==
A pre-production electric version called the Hanteng X5 EV was revealed in 2018 previewing an electric version of the Hanteng X5.

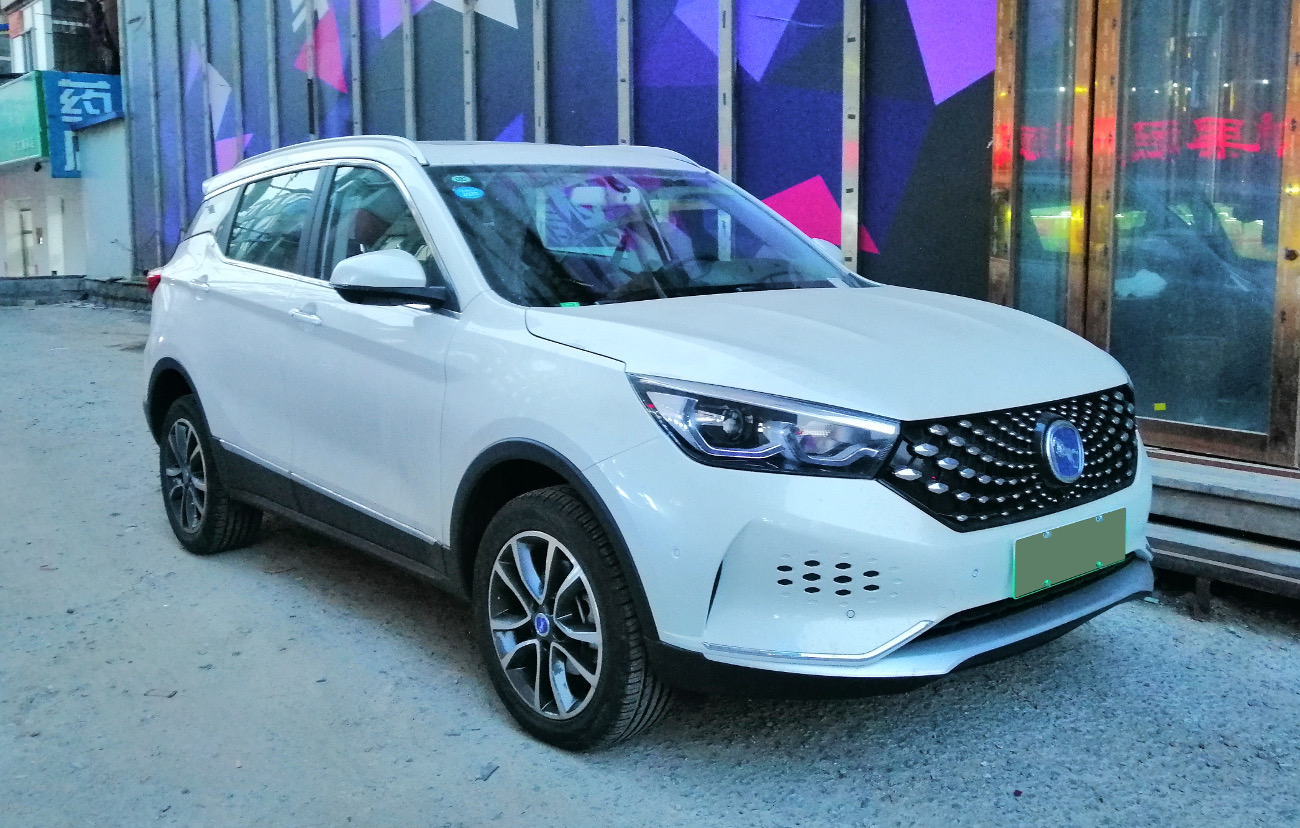
Hanteng X5 EV front

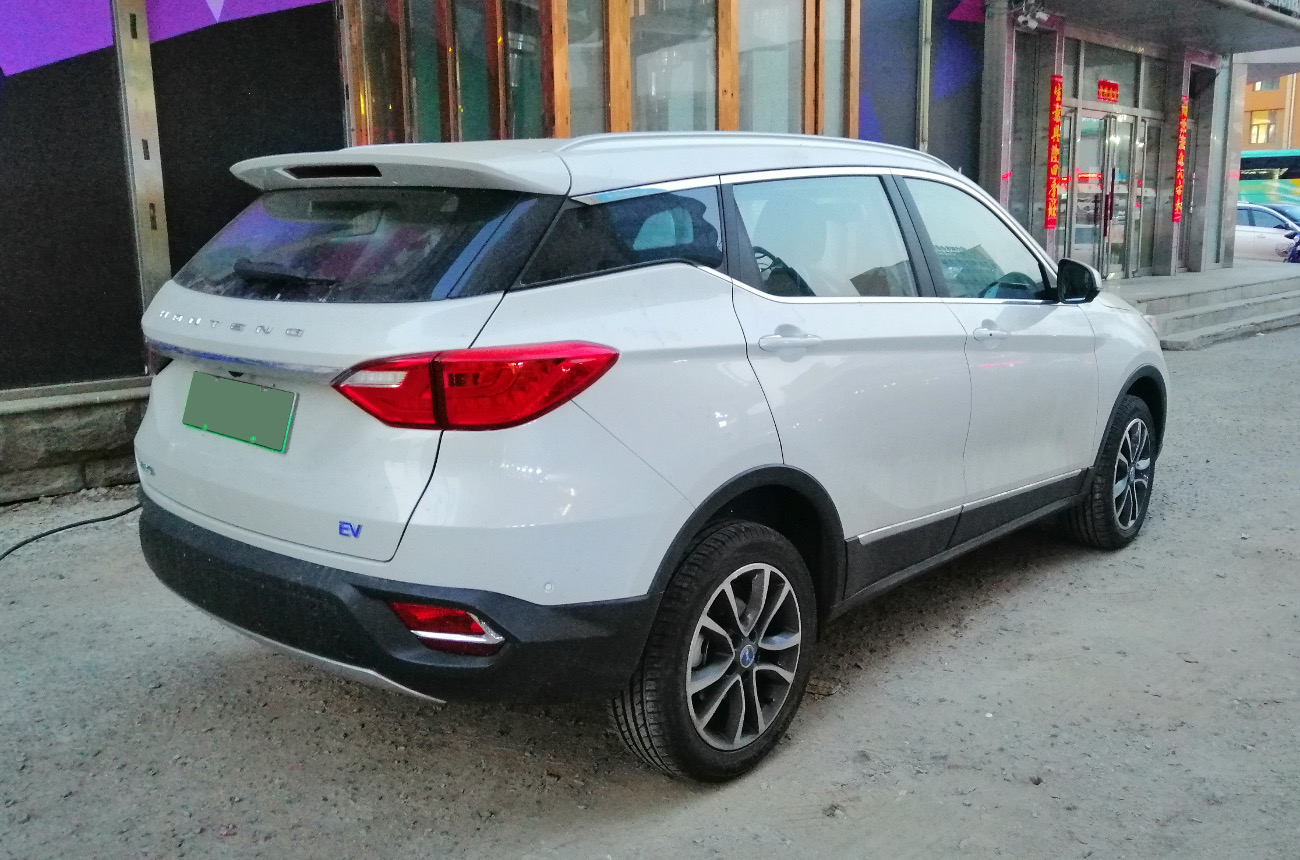
Hanteng X5 EV rear
