= Hanteng Autos =

Chinese automobile manufacturer

Jiangxi Hanteng Automobile Co., Ltd.
- Type: Private
- Industry: Automotive
- Founded: 2013
- Defunct: 2022
- Fate: Bankruptcy
- Headquarters: Shangrao, Jiangxi, China
- Products: Automobiles
- Website: hantengauto.com

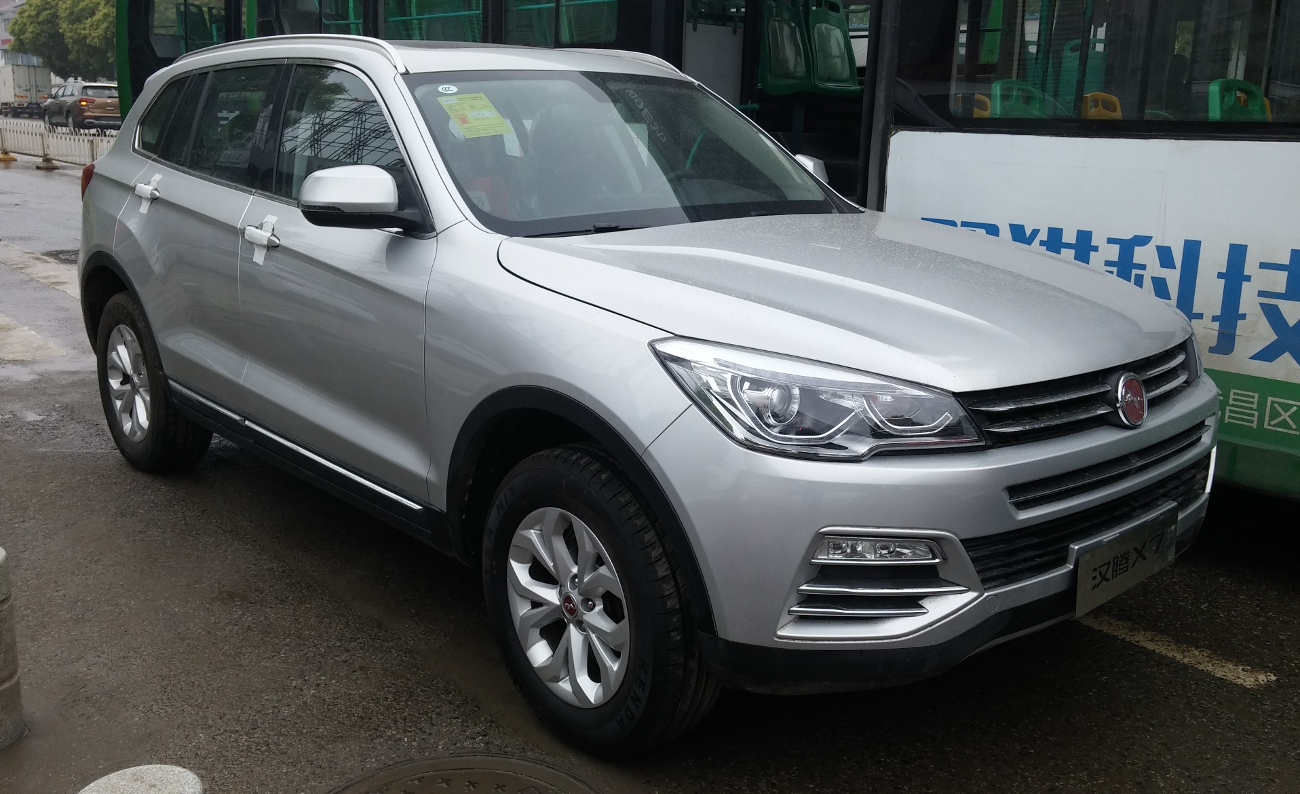
A Hanteng X7

Hanteng Autos (Chinese: 汉腾汽车; officially Jiangxi Hanteng Automobile Co., Ltd.) was a privately owned Chinese automobile manufacturer headquartered in Shangrao, Jiangxi, China. It is a private automobile manufacturing company that mainly focused on the research and development, manufacture and marketing of traditional fuel-powered vehicles, new energy vehicles, and automotive parts.

== History ==
Established in November 2013 and headquartered in the Shangrao Economic and Technological Development Zone in Shangrao, Jiangxi.

- November 2013 – Parent company established.
- December 2013 – Construction of the Hanteng Autos factory started.
- June 2014 – New Energy development started with the launch of the Hanteng BMS project with investments up to 37 hundred million rmb.
- December 2015 – Production of the first product, Hanteng X7 has begun.
- November 2016 – Hanteng X5 introduced to the Chinese market.
- September 2017 – Contract signed with Derways, a Russian auto manufacturer, making Russia the first export market for Hanteng Autos.
- November 2017 – Hanteng X7S and Hanteng X7 PHEV launched at the Guangzhou Auto Show.
- April 2022 – Hanteng declared bankruptcy.

== Subsidiary ==
- Hanteng New Energy Automobile Technology Co., Ltd.
- Jiangxi Hanteng New Energy Automobile Co., Ltd.
- Jiangxi Hanteng Automobile Sales Co., Ltd.

== Former models ==
- Hanteng X5
- Hanteng X5 EV
- Hanteng X7
- Hanteng X7S
- Hanteng X7 PHEV
- Hanteng X8
- Hanteng V7

== Product Gallery ==
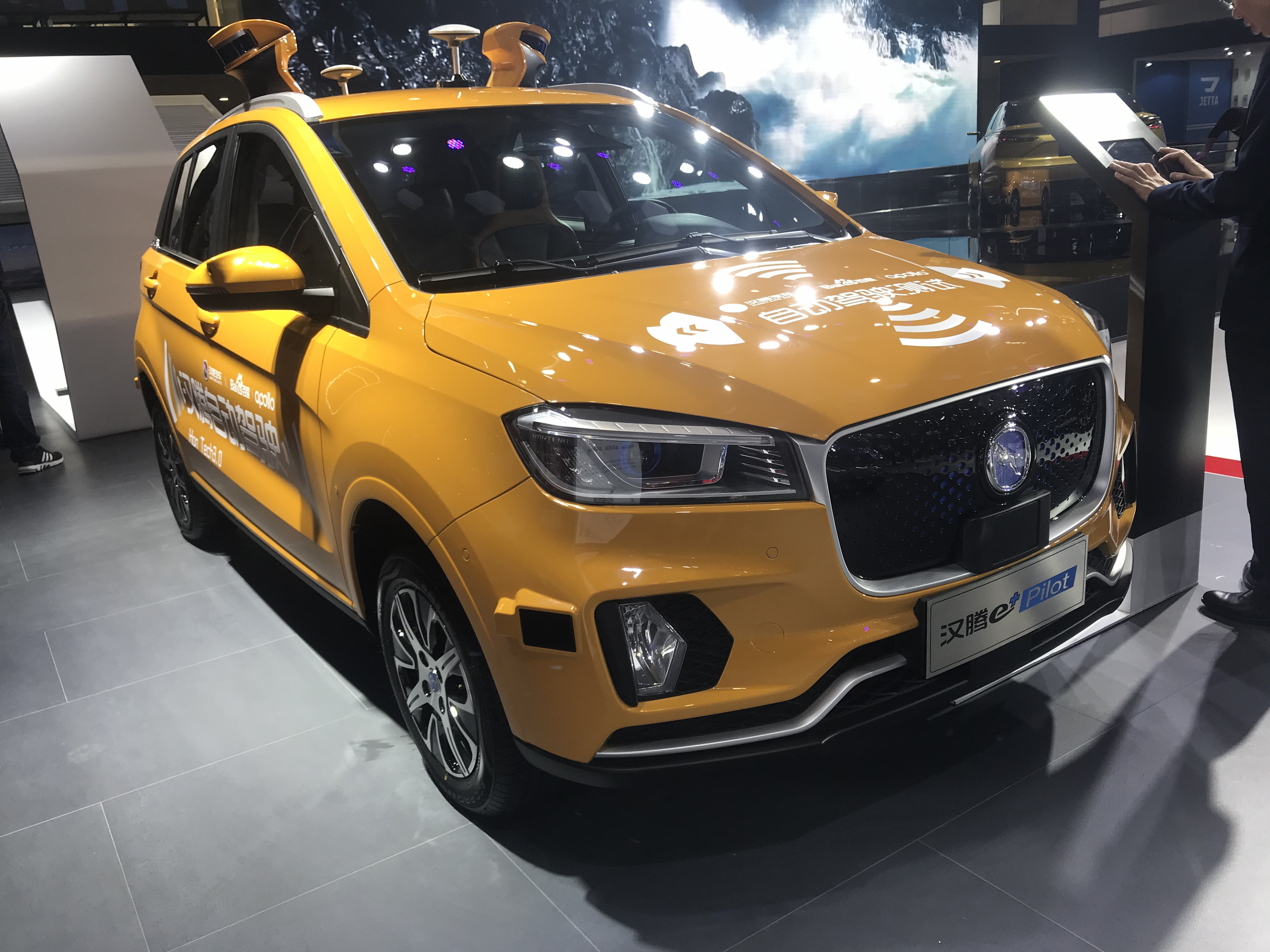
Hanteng Xingfu e+

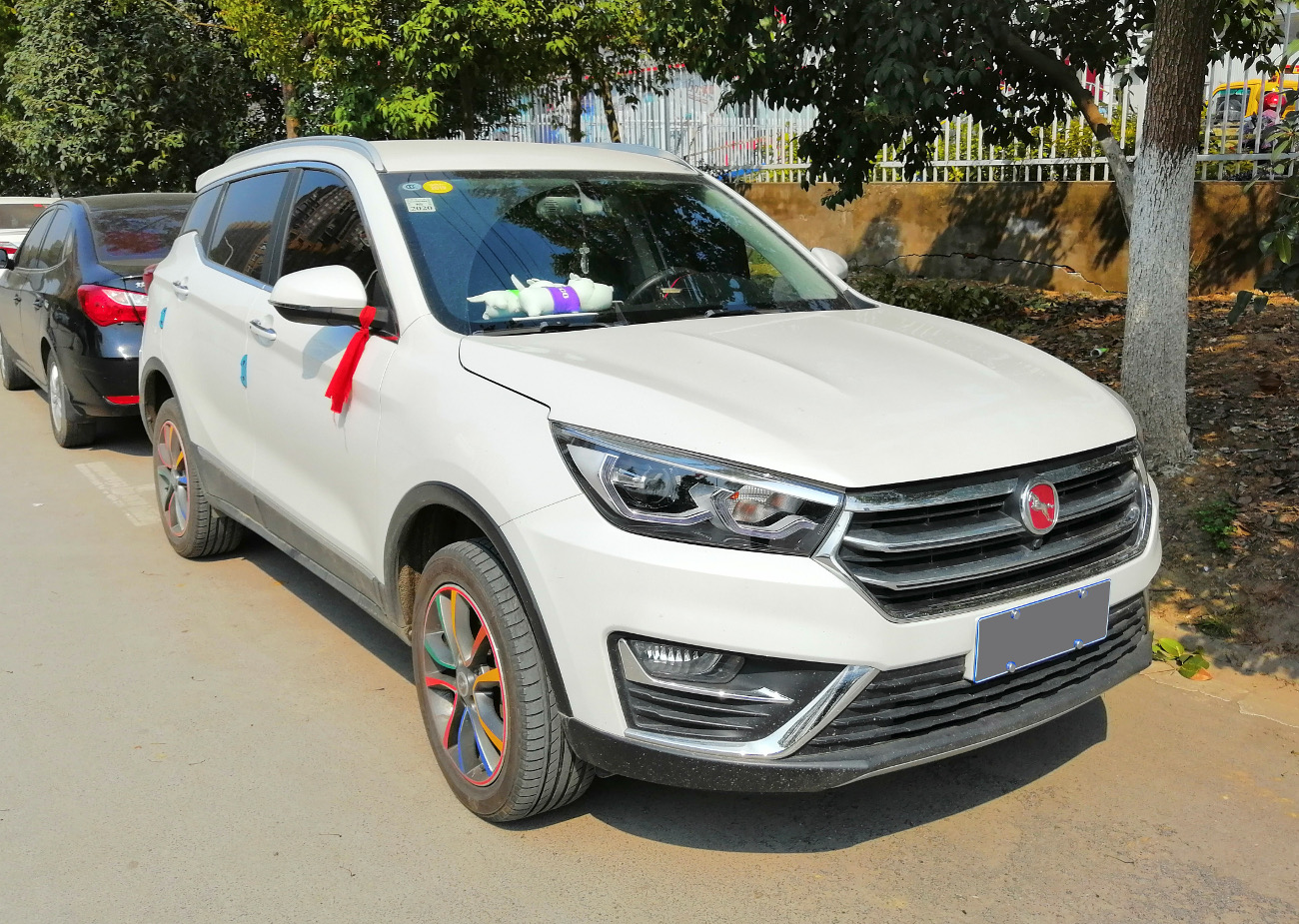
Hanteng X5

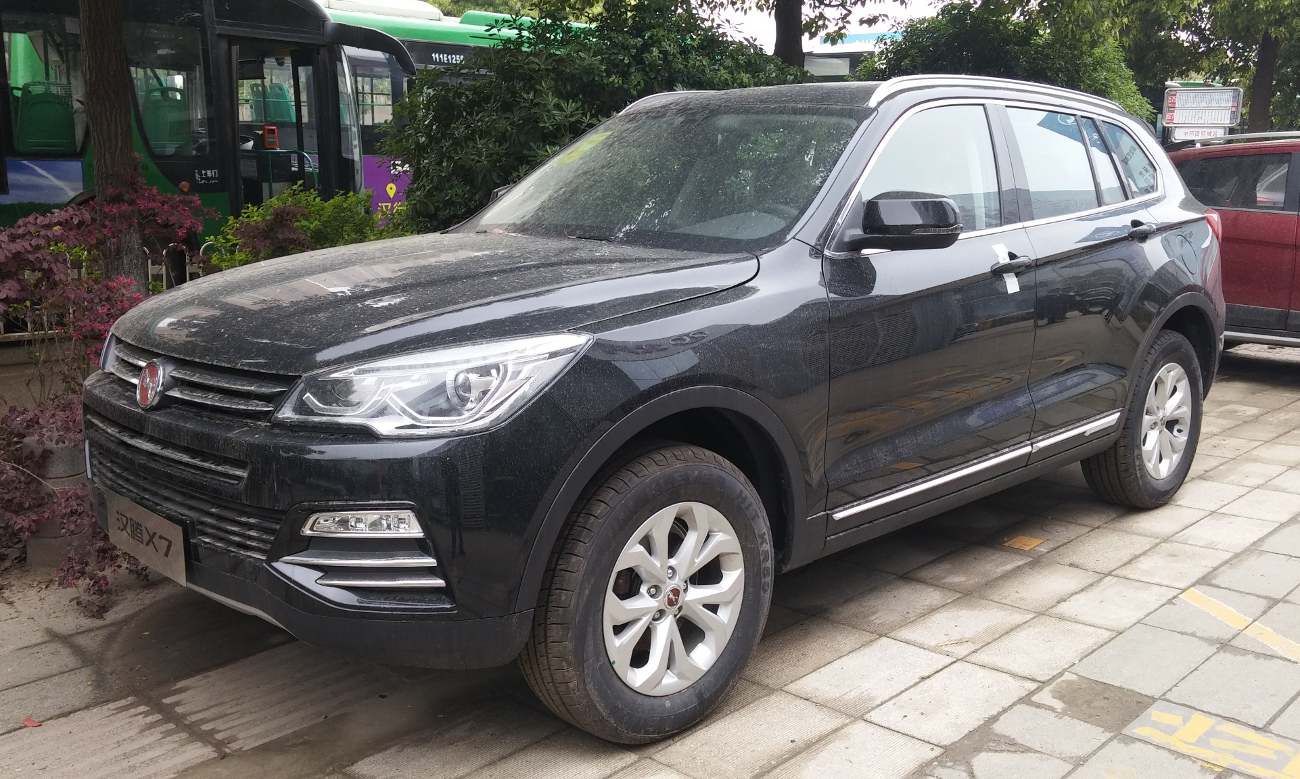
Hanteng X7

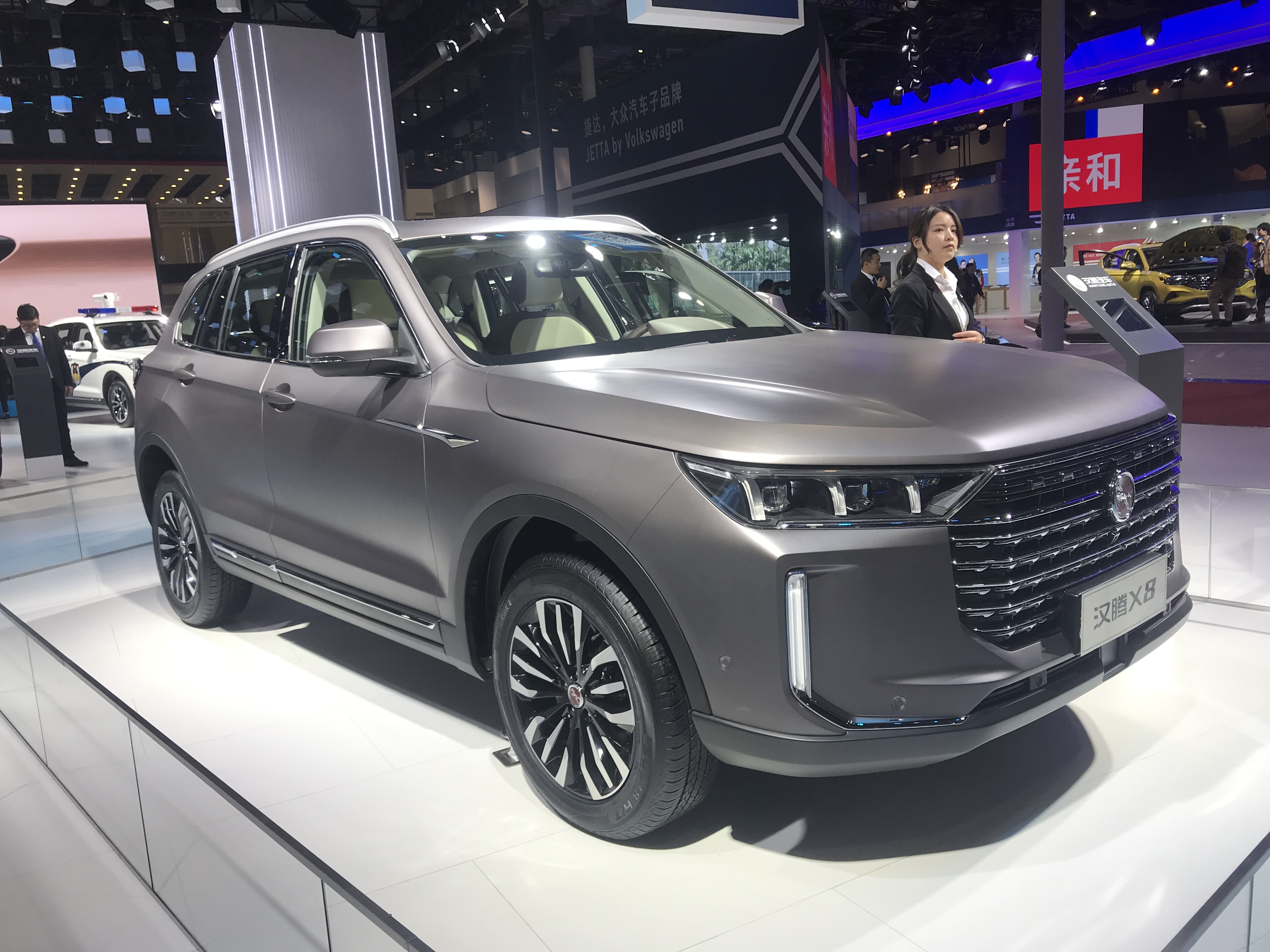
Hanteng X8

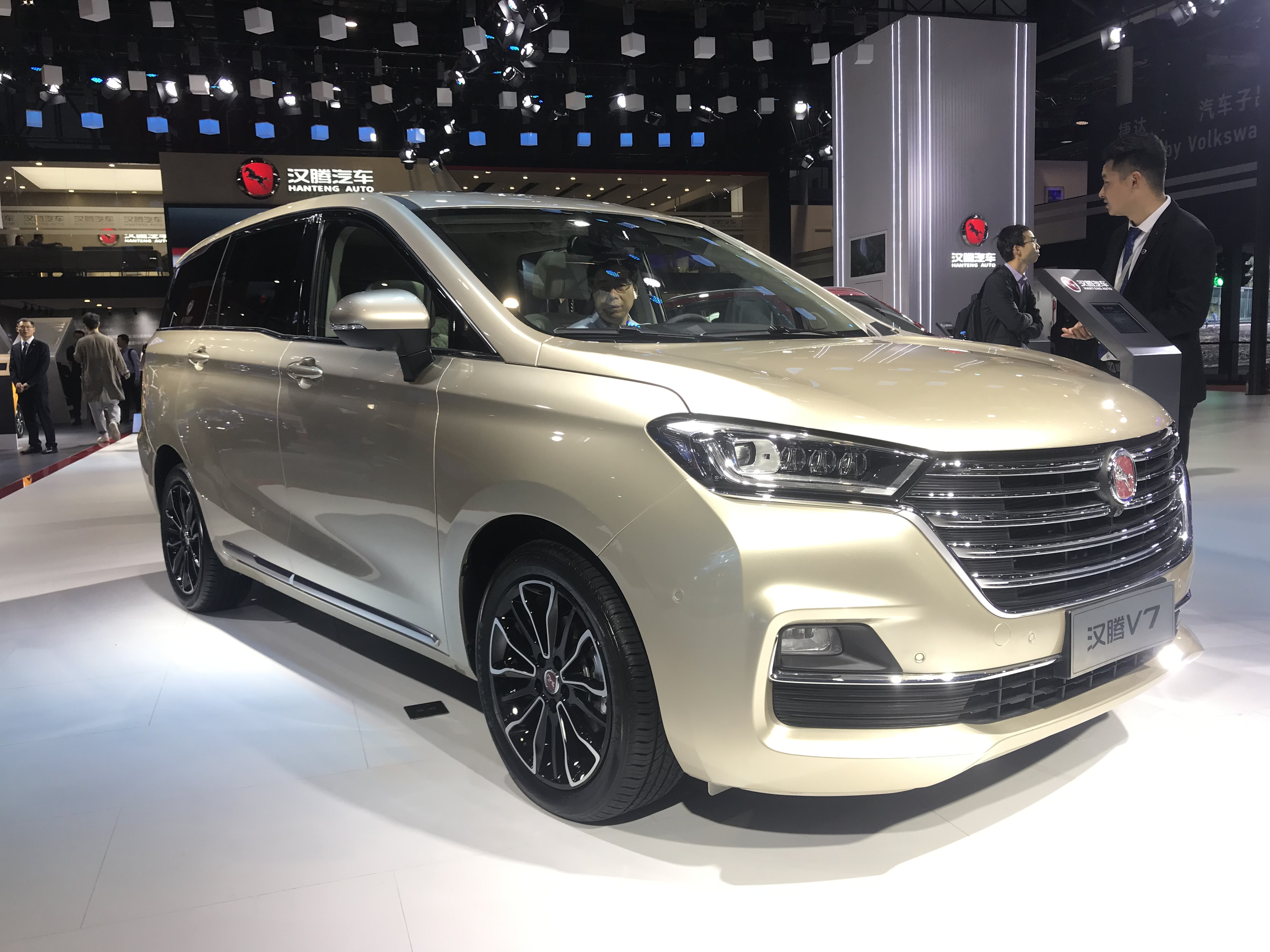
Hanteng V7
