= Dorcen G60s =

Chinese crossover utility vehicle

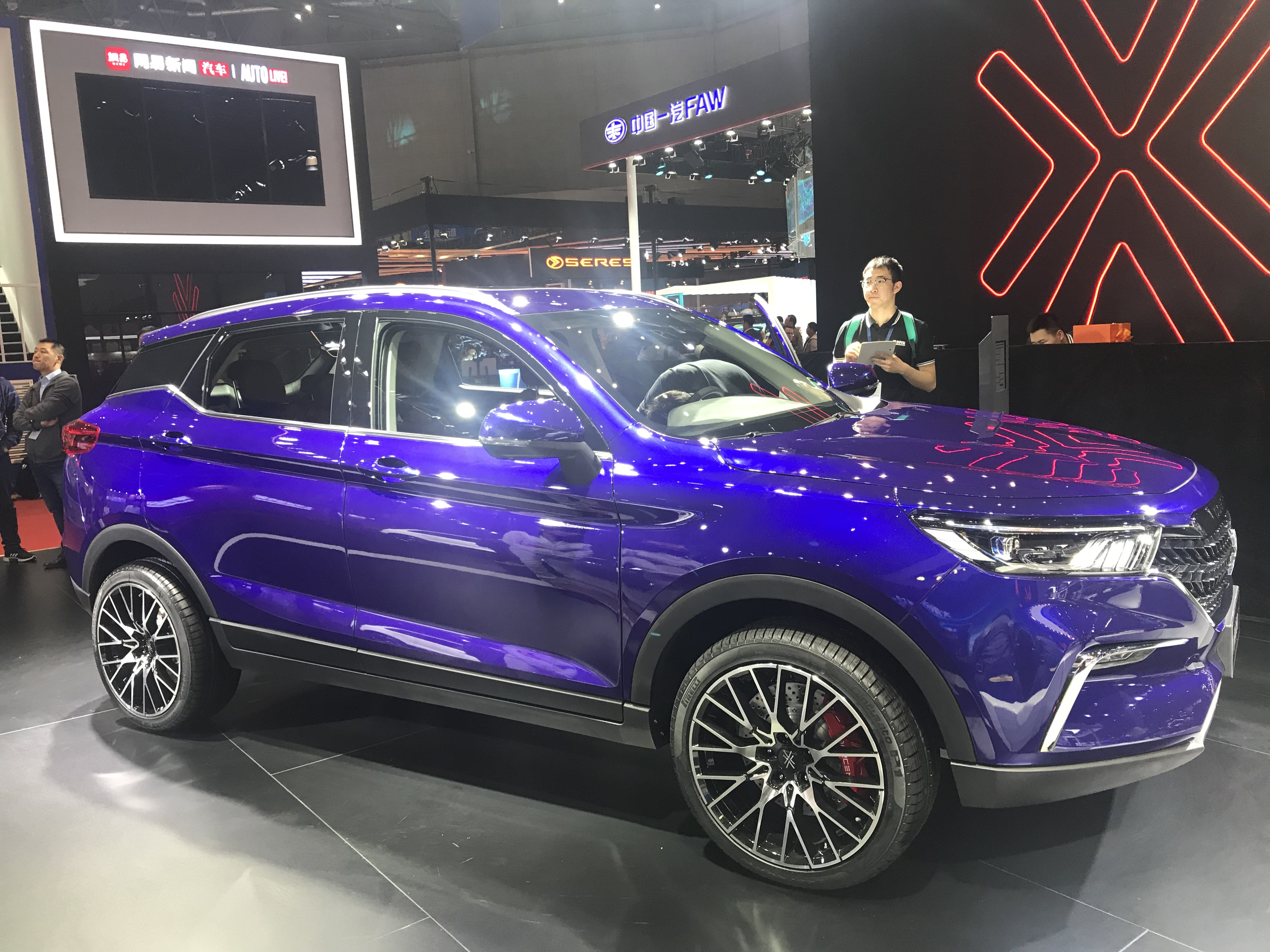

Overview
- Manufacturer: Dorcen
- Also called: Elaris Leo (Europe)
- Production: 2019–2021
- Model years: 2019–2021
- Assembly: China: Jiangxi

Body and chassis
- Class: Compact crossover SUV (C)
- Body style: 5-door SUV
- Layout: Front-engine, front-wheel-drive
- Related: Hanteng X5

Powertrain
- Engine: Petrol: 1.5 L JT15T I4 turbo
- Transmission: 6-speed manual; 8-speed semi-automatic

Dimensions
- Wheelbase: 2,680 mm (105.5 in)
- Length: 4,521 mm (178.0 in)
- Width: 1,840 mm (72.4 in)
- Height: 1,672 mm (65.8 in)

The Dorcen G60s is a compact crossover SUV produced by the Chinese manufacturer Dorcen from 2019 to 2021.

== Overview ==
The Dorcen G60s was introduced at the brand debut in 2018. While Dorcen claims to be an independent brand, Dorcen products were obviously based on Zotye products, with the Dorcen G60s based on the Hanteng X5 compact SUV from Hanteng, a sub-brand owned by Zotye.

The production version Dorcen G60s was launched in January 2019, and was powered by the 1.5-liter turbo inline-four petrol engine code named JT15T shared with the Zotye Domy X5 producing 150 hp (110 kW)/5500rpm with a torque of 215N·m/1700-4500rpm. Transmission options include a 6-speed manual transmission and a 8-speed semi-automatic transmission.

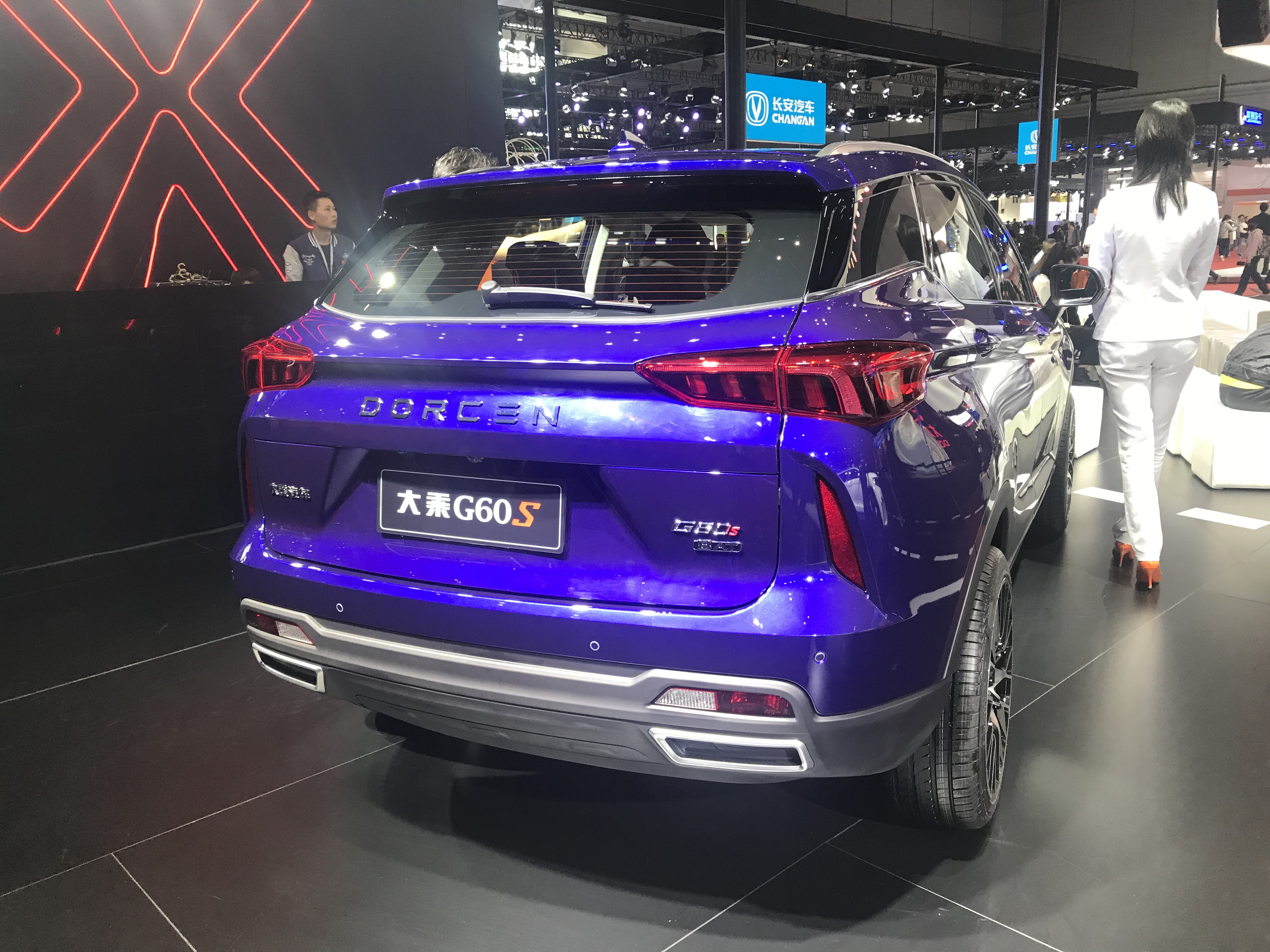
Dorcen G60S rear
