= Trumpchi M6 =

Compact MPV

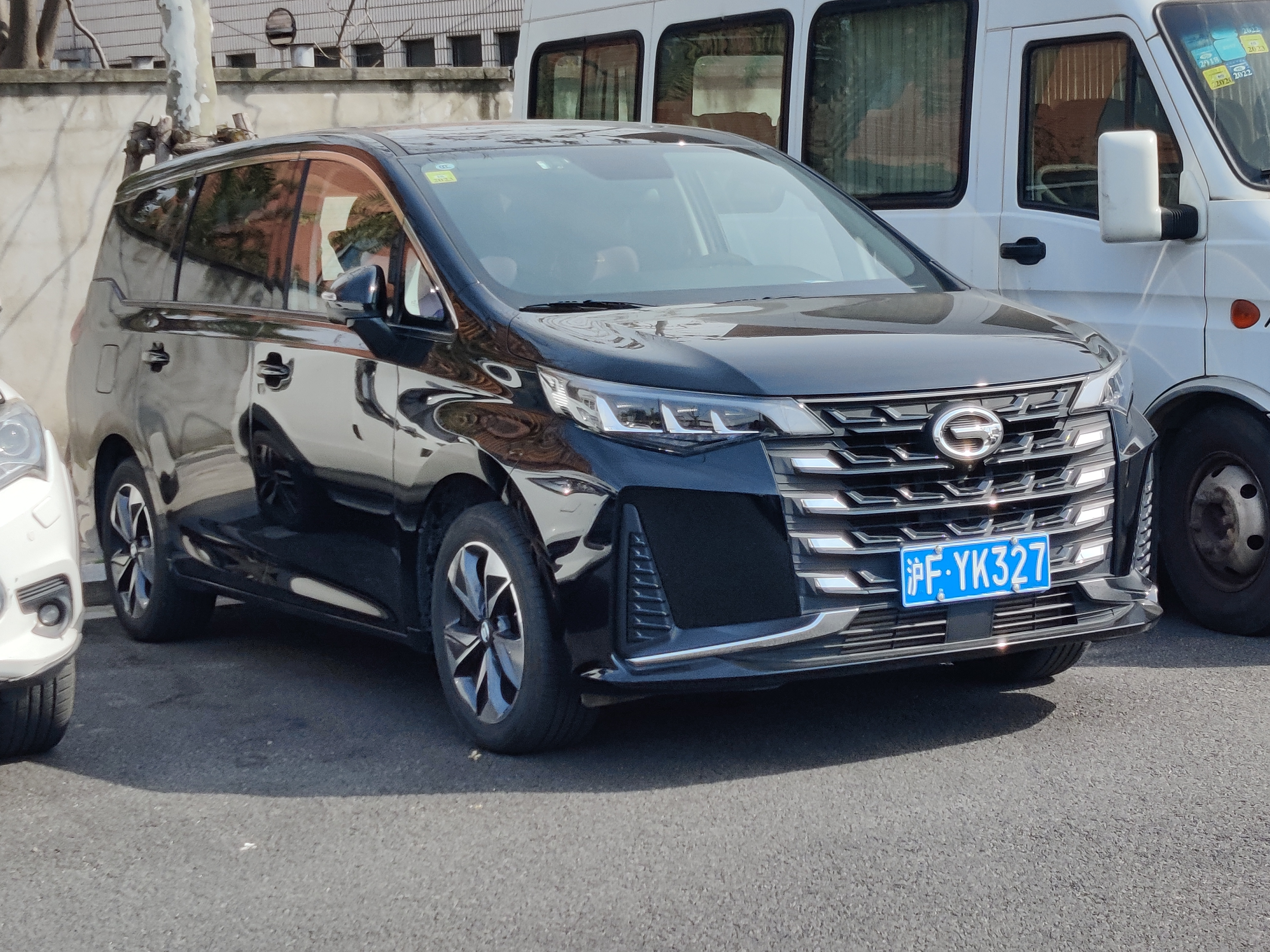

Overview
- Manufacturer: GAC Motor
- Also called: Trumpchi GM6 (pre-facelift); GAC GM6; GAC GN6 (Philippines); GAC M6 Pro (Vietnam)
- Production: 2018–present
- Designer: Xiao Lin

Body and chassis
- Class: Compact MPV
- Body style: 5-door minivan
- Layout: Front-engine, front-wheel-drive

Powertrain
- Engine: Petrol: 1.5 L 4A15J1 turbo I4; 1.5 L 4A15J2 turbo I4
- Transmission: 6-speed manual; 6-speed automatic; 7-speed DCT

Dimensions
- Wheelbase: 2,810 mm (110.6 in)
- Length: 4,780–4,793 mm (188.2–188.7 in)
- Width: 1,837–1,860 mm (72.3–73.2 in)
- Height: 1,730 mm (68.1 in); 1,765 mm (69.5 in) (with shark fin antenna)
- Curb weight: 1,600–1,660 kg (3,527–3,660 lb)

The Trumpchi M6 and the previous Trumpchi GM6 is a compact MPV manufactured by GAC Group under the Trumpchi brand in China and the GAC Motor brand globally as the GAC GM6 or the GAC GN6. The GM6 name was changed in 2020 to M6 in China and GN6 globally followed by the larger M8 minivan name change.

== Overview ==
In China, the GM6 is classified as a compact seven-seat MPV, competing with Buick GL6 and Maxus G50.

The GM6 was launched at the 2018 Beijing Auto Show as Trumpchi's second MPV model following the Trumpchi GM8, and was launched in the Chinese car market in the first quarter of 2019 with prices ranging from around 109,800 to 159,800 yuan. The Trumpchi GM6 is available in either a seven-seat 2/2/3 setup or a six-seat version.

The GM6 is equipped with a 1.5 liter turbo inline-four petrol engine codenamed 4A15J1 producing 171 horsepower (128 kW) and 265N·m. Fuel consumption is 7.3L/100 km and 7.4L/100 km.

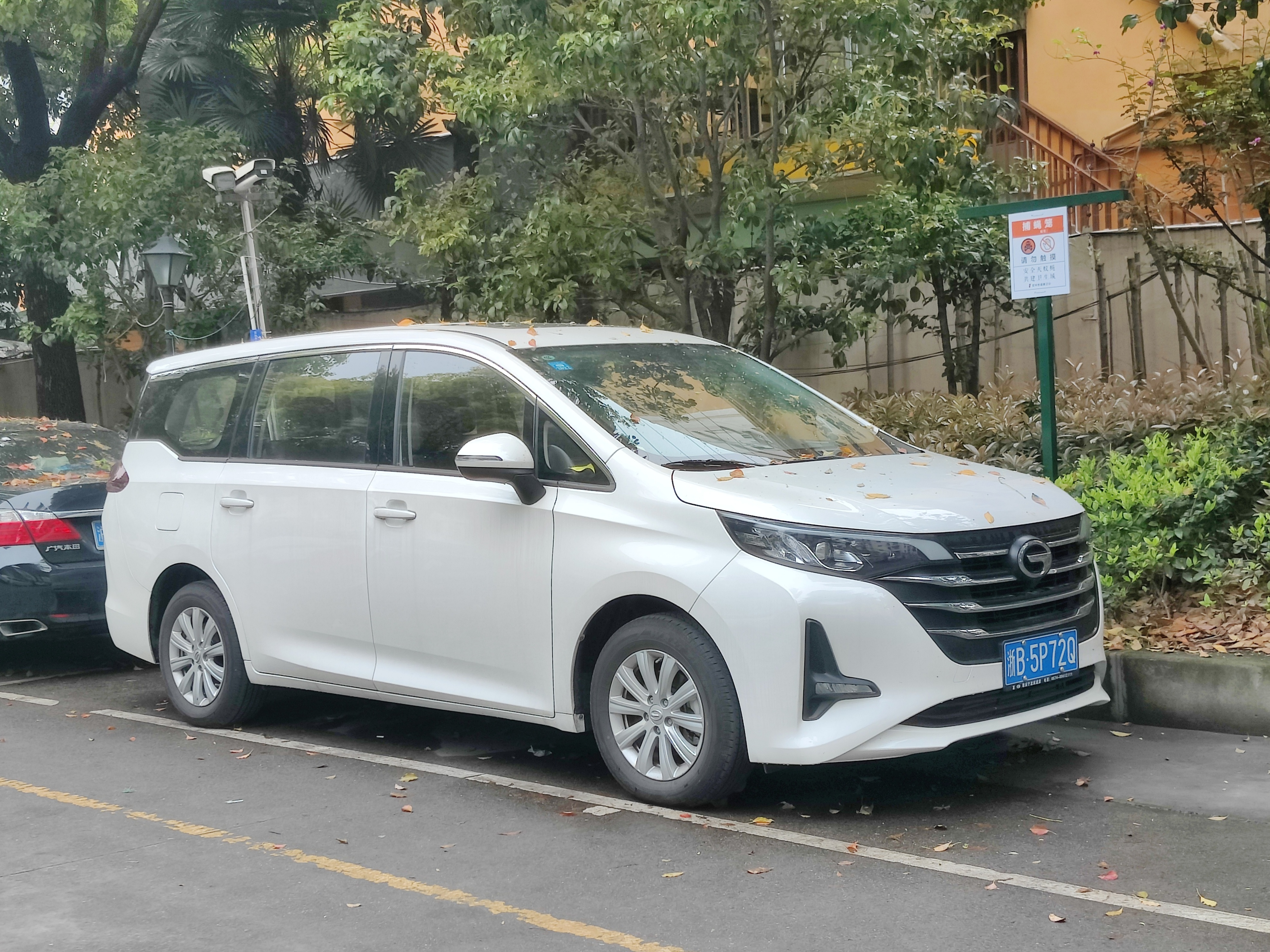
Trumpchi GM6

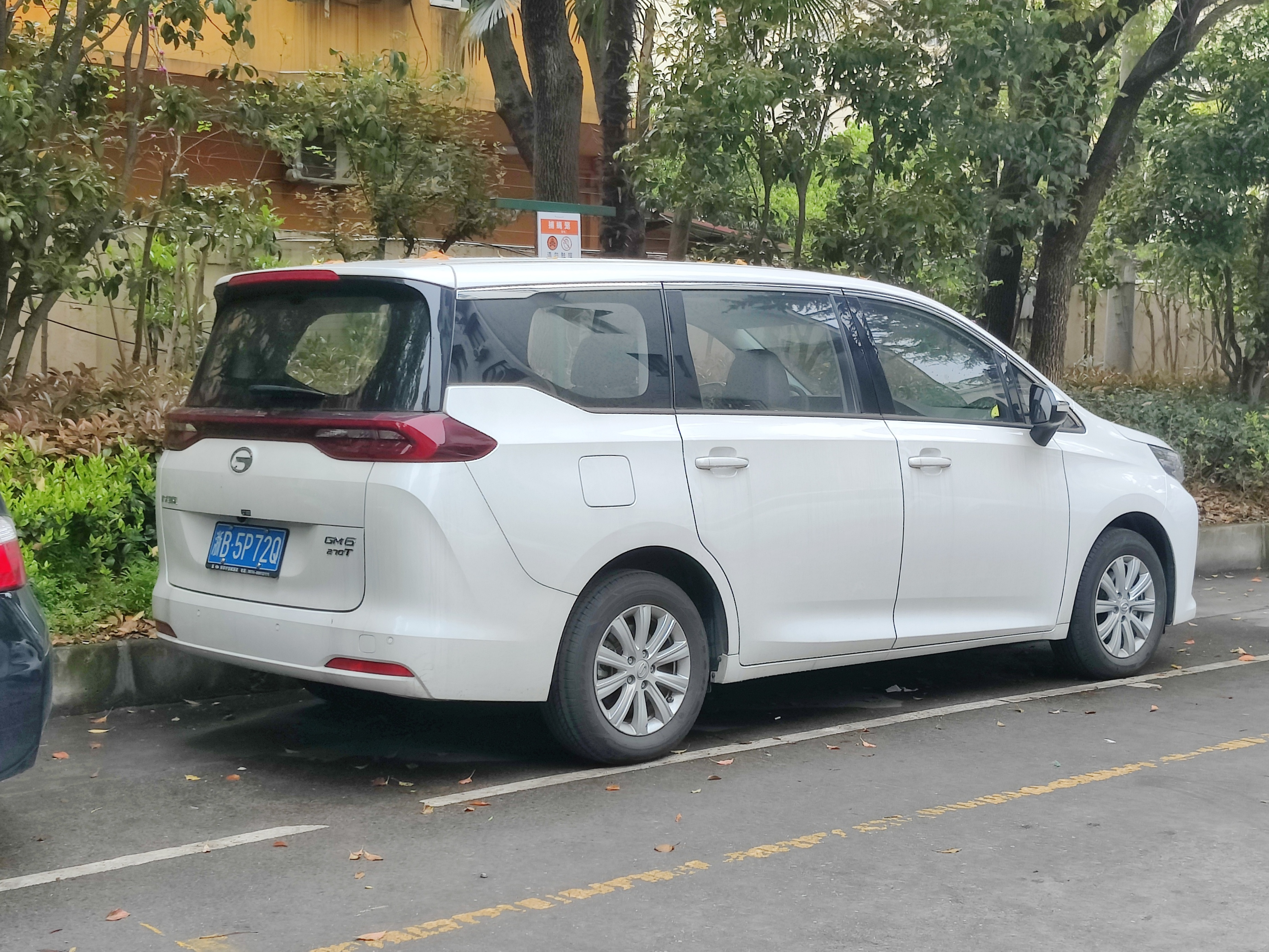
Rear view

=== Trumpchi M6 rename ===
A facelift was revealed in September 2020 changing the name of the GM6 in the Chinese market to M6, following the M8. A version featuring a body kit called the Trumpchi M6 Master Edition was also available from November 2020.

=== Trumpchi M6 Pro ===
Based on the M6, another facelift was launched during the 2021 Shanghai Autoshow called the M6 Pro, featuring a redesigned front fascia. Powertrain remains unchanged.

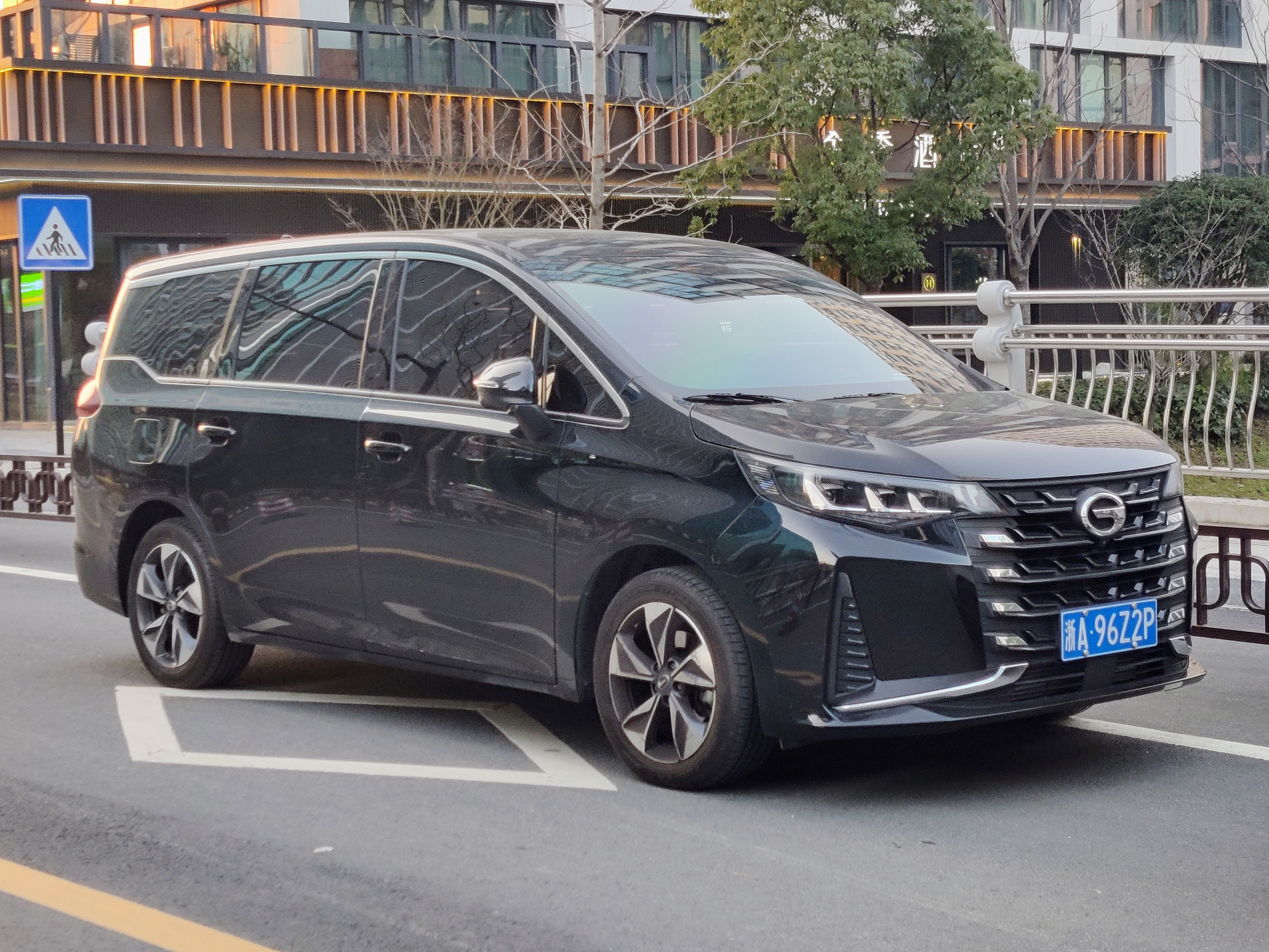
Trumpchi M6 Pro

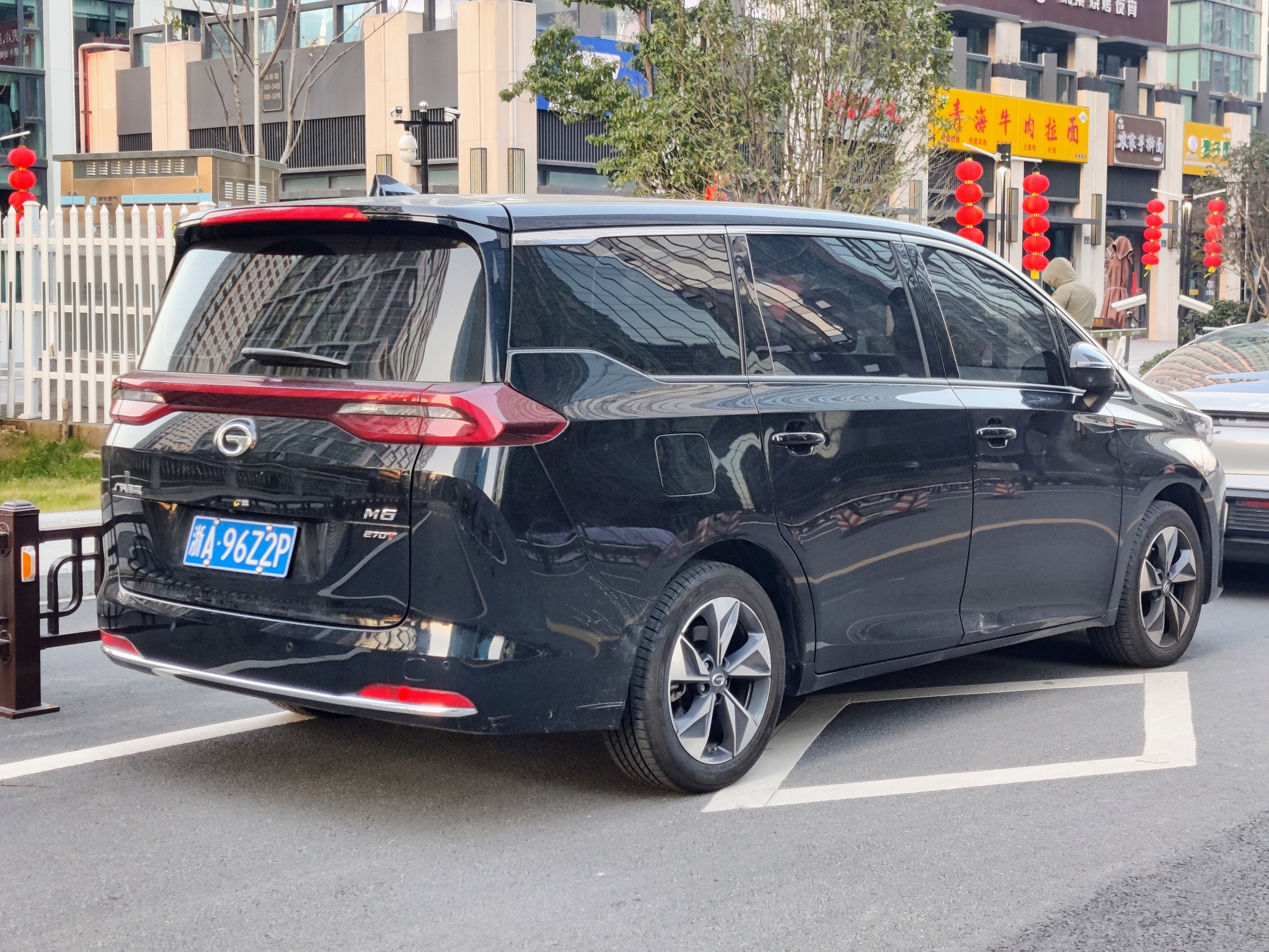
Rear view

=== Trumpchi M6 Max (2024 and 2026) ===
The M6 Max was first introduced during the 2024 Beijing Auto Show. The M6 Max was introduced as a facelift replacing the M6 Pro with revised front bumper and tail gate designs. The 2024 M6 Max is powered by a 1.5 liter turbo Mega Wave Power (钜浪动力, Julang) engine developing a maximum output of 130kW and 270N·m. The styling of the M6 Max remained throughout the 2025 model year.

Trumpchi M6 Max MY2024–2025 styling

Rear view

The M6 Max 2026 facelift was launched on 15 May 2026. It features a lightly modified exterior with a new waterfall grille design and major redesign to the dashboard. The dashboard now features a 12.3-inch digital instrument cluster and a standing 15.6-inch central infotainment touchscreen with a buttonless design. The shifter has been moved from the center console to the steering column, opening up space for dual wireless charging pads. The front and second row seats have heating and ventilation functions, and it has a 324-litre (11.4 cu ft) rear cargo area, which expands to 1,100 L (39 cu ft) with the third row folded down.

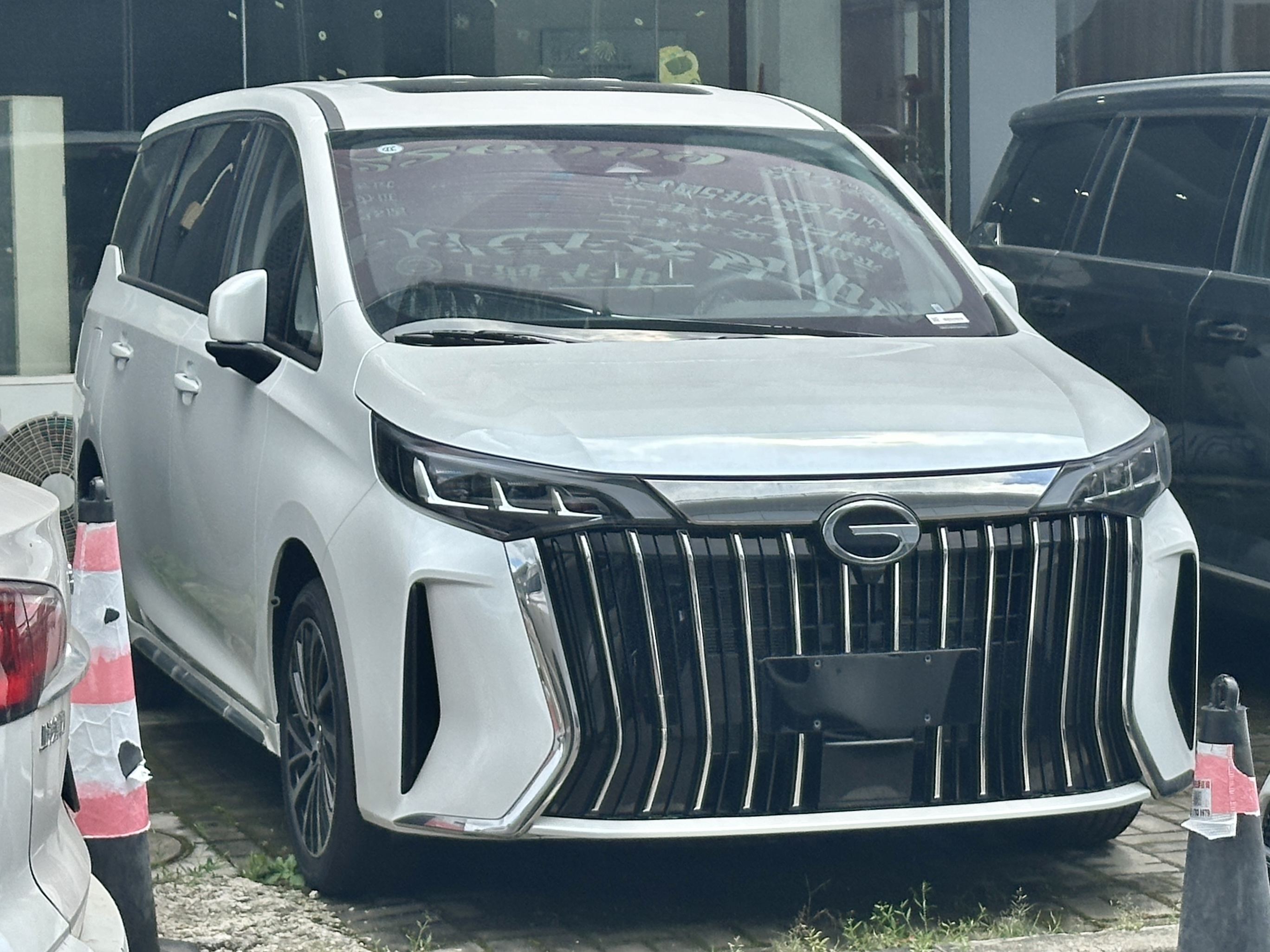
Trumpchi M6 Max MY2026 styling

== Markets ==
=== Philippines ===
The vehicle is marketed in the Philippines as the GAC GN6 and was launched on 29 July 2026. It is available in the sole GX trim, powered by the 1.5-litre turbocharged petrol engine.

=== Vietnam ===
The vehicle is marketed in Vietnam as the GAC M6 Pro and was launched on 23 October 2024. It is available with two trim levels: GS and GL, powered by the 1.5-litre turbocharged petrol engine.

== Powertrain ==
Specs
Model	Engine	Years	Transmission	Power	Torque	0–100 km/h (0–62 mph) (Official)	Top speed
1.5 L Turbo	1.5 L (1497cc) I4 (turbo petrol)	2018–2020	6-speed automatic	125 kW (170 PS; 168 hp)	265 N⋅m (195 lb⋅ft)		
1.5 L Turbo	1.5 L (1497cc) I4 (turbo petrol)	2020–present	7-speed DCT	130 kW (177 PS; 174 hp) at 5,500 rpm	270 N⋅m (199 lb⋅ft) at 1,400–4,500 rpm	9.4s	190 km/h (118 mph)

== Sales ==
Year	China
2023	50,677
2024	46,064
2025	31,899
