= Hanteng X7 =

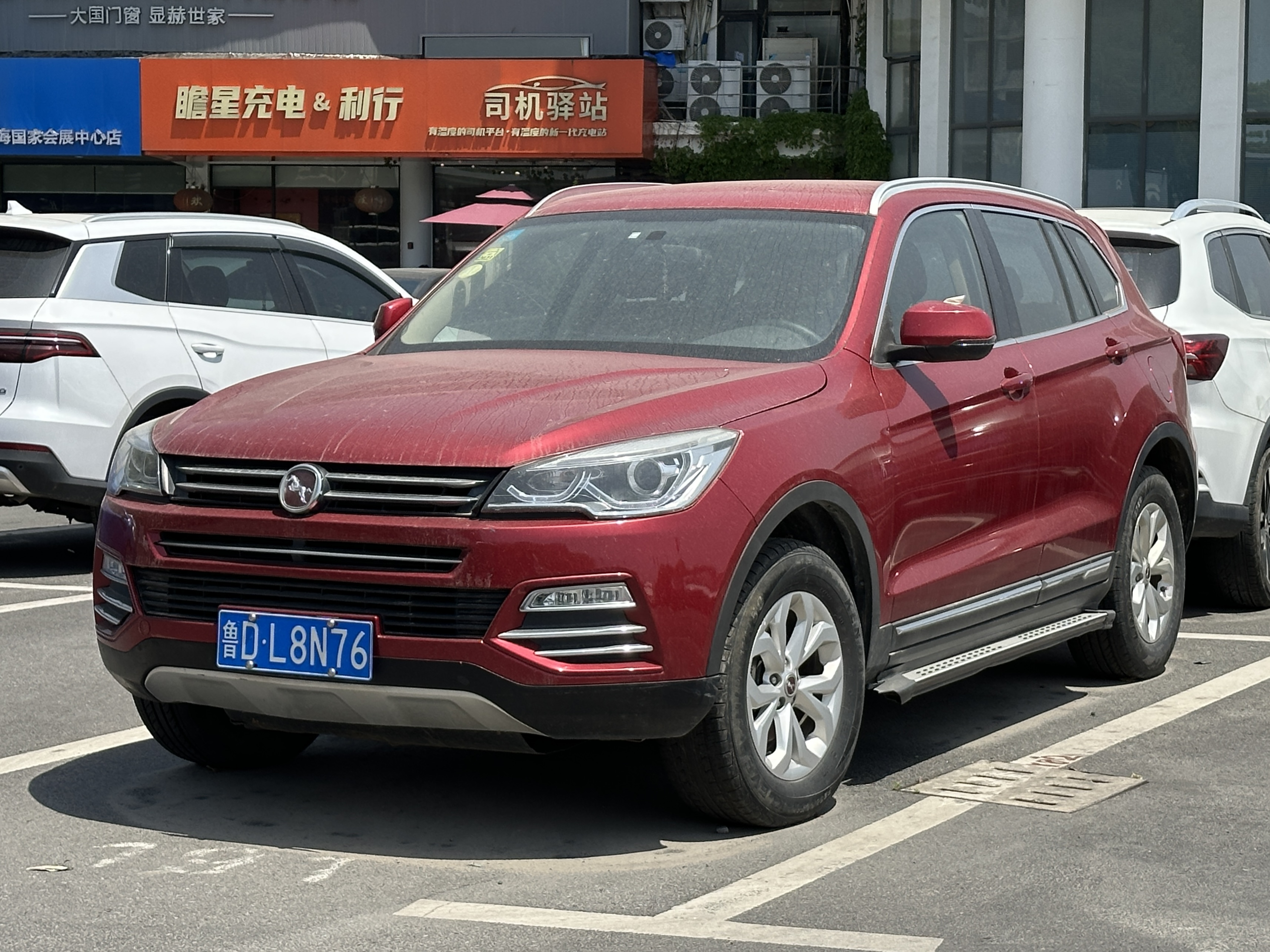

Overview
- Manufacturer: Hanteng Autos
- Also called: Hanteng X7S; Hanteng X7 PHEV
- Production: 2016–2021
- Model years: 2016–2021
- Assembly: Jiangxi, China; Borujerd, Iran (Azim Khodro)

Body and chassis
- Class: mid-size CUV
- Body style: 5-door wagon
- Layout: Front-engine, front-wheel-drive

Powertrain
- Engine: 1.5 L turbo I4 (gasoline); 2.0 L turbo I4 (gasoline)
- Transmission: 5 speed manual 6 speed DCT

Dimensions
- Wheelbase: 2,810 mm (110.6 in)
- Length: 4,671 mm (183.9 in)
- Width: 1,902 mm (74.9 in)
- Height: 1,697 mm (66.8 in)

The Hanteng X7 is a mid-size crossover utility vehicle (CUV) produced by the Chinese manufacturer Hanteng Autos from 2016 to 2021.

== Overview ==
The Hanteng X7 is Hanteng's first product. Two engines are available including a 1.5L turbo producing 150hp and 215nm of torque, and a 2.0L turbo producing 190hp and 250nm of torque. The 1.5L turbo is mated to a 5 speed manual gearbox, and the 2.0L turbo comes with a 6 speed DCT. The engines are sourced from Mitsubishi, manufactured in China by the Shenyang-Mitsubishi engine-making joint venture.

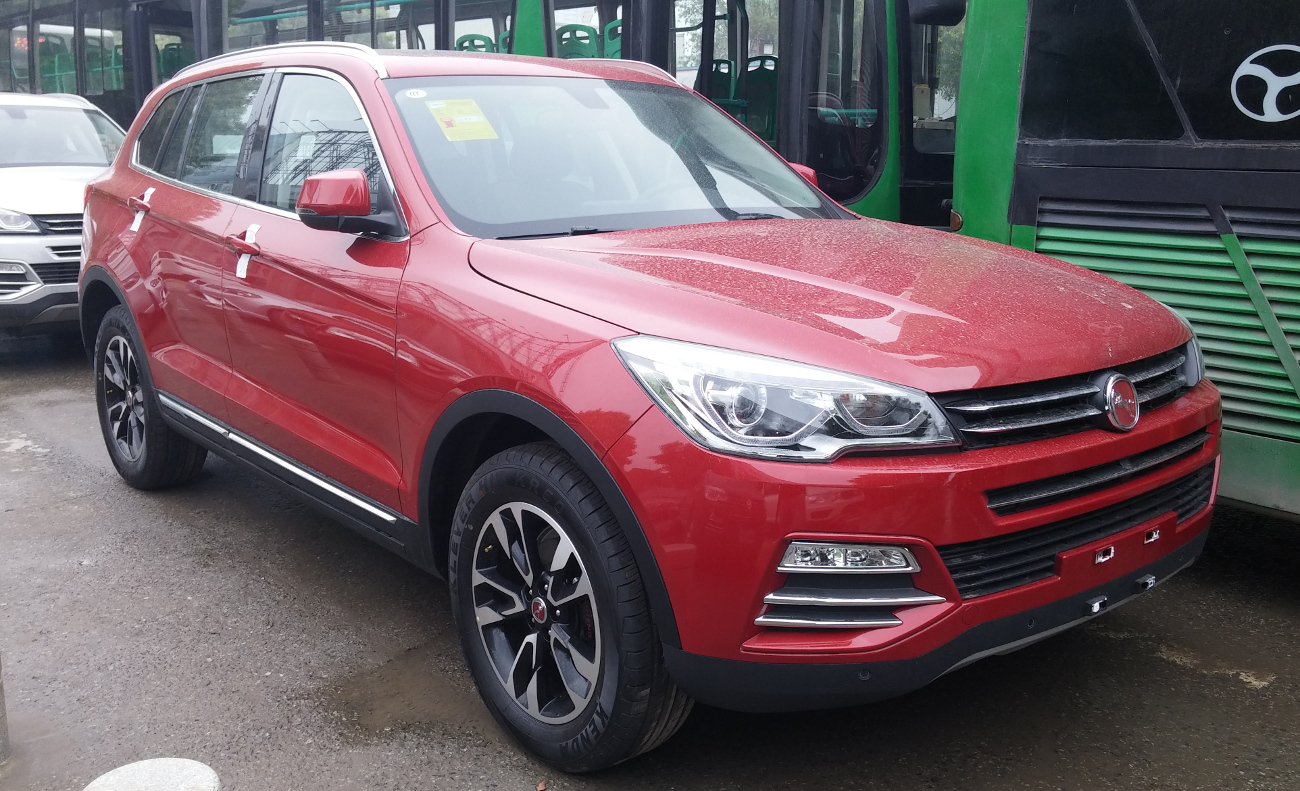
Hanteng X7 front

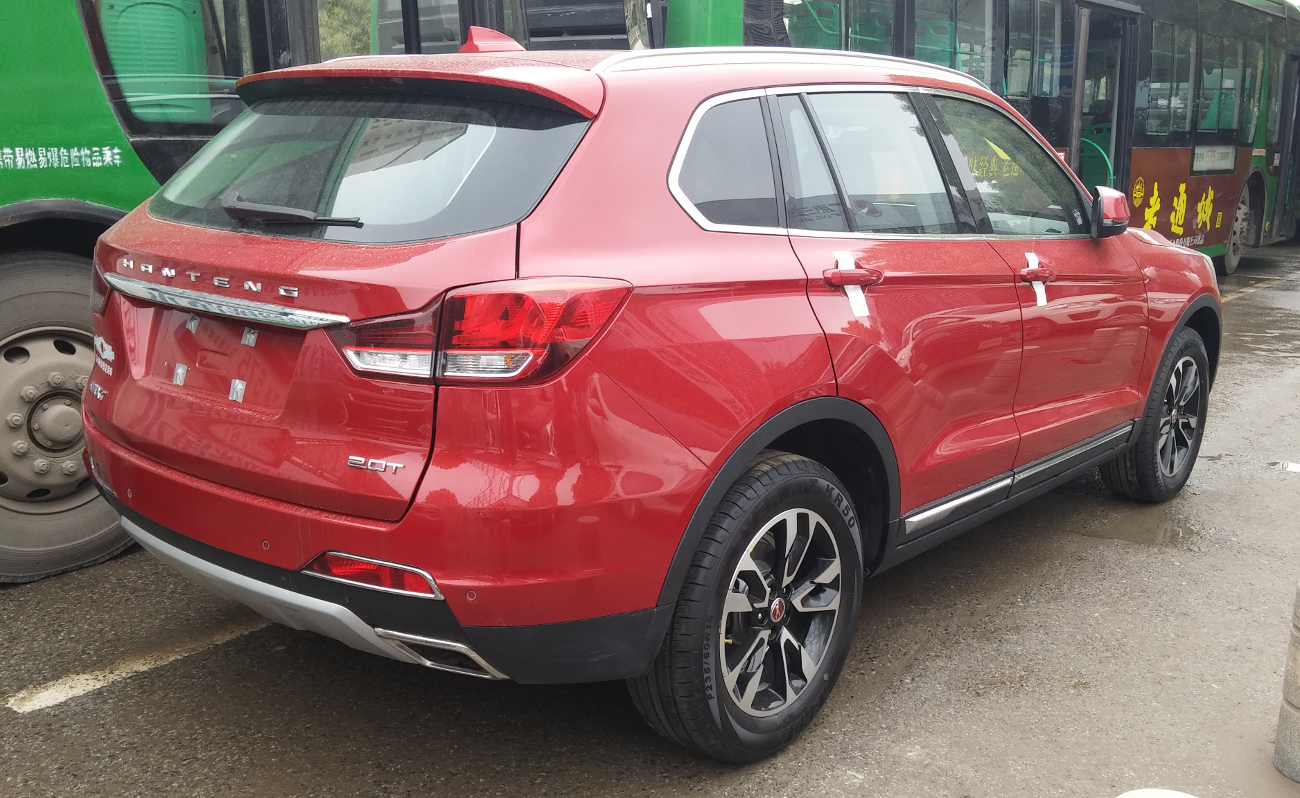
Hanteng X7 rear

=== Hanteng X7S and Hanteng X7 PHEV ===
A sportier version dubbed the Hanteng X7S and a plug-in hybrid version called the Hanteng X7 PHEV was launched during the 2017 Guangzhou Auto Show. Both versions feature redesigned front bumpers to differ from the regular version.

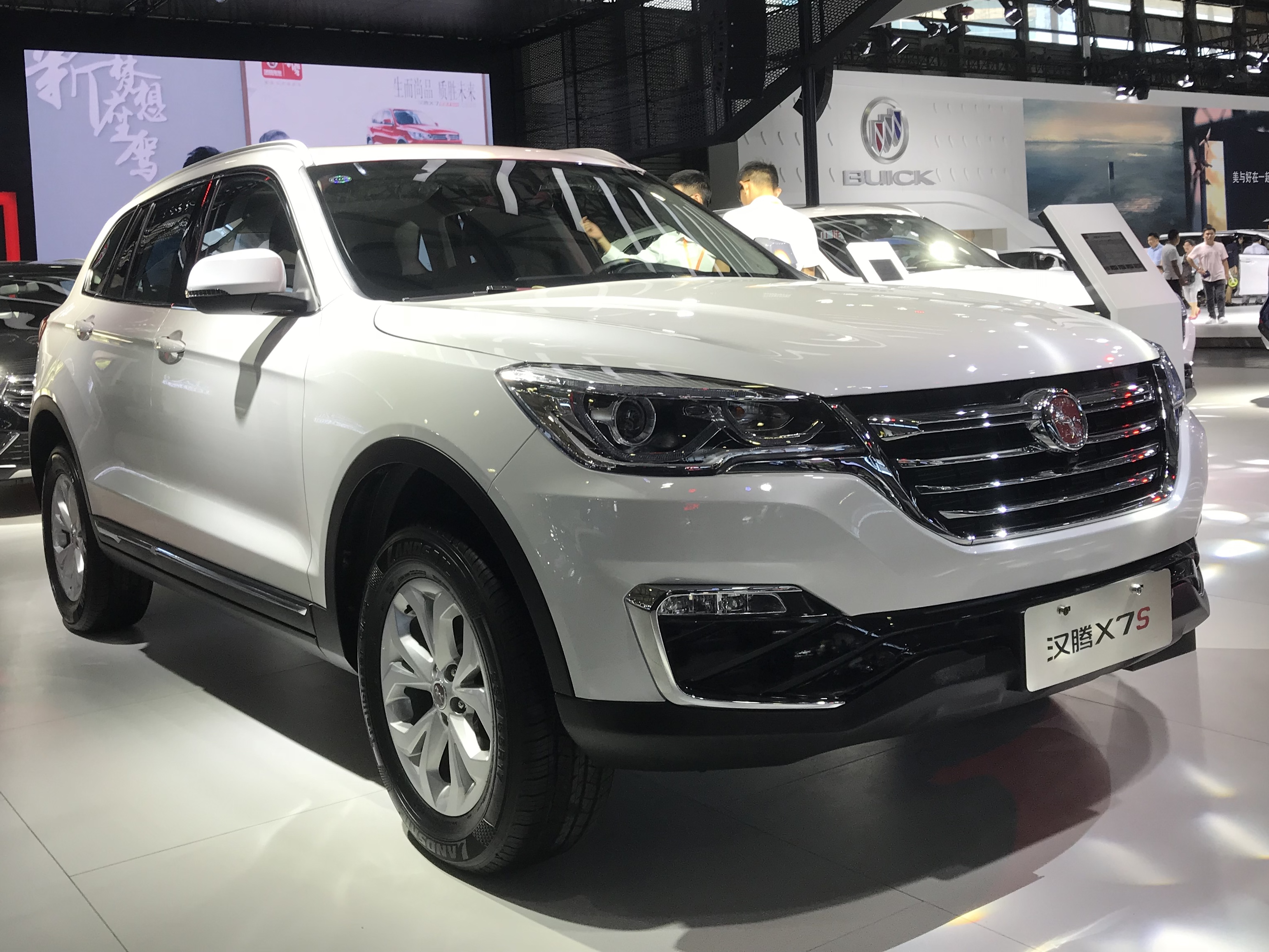
Hanteng X7S

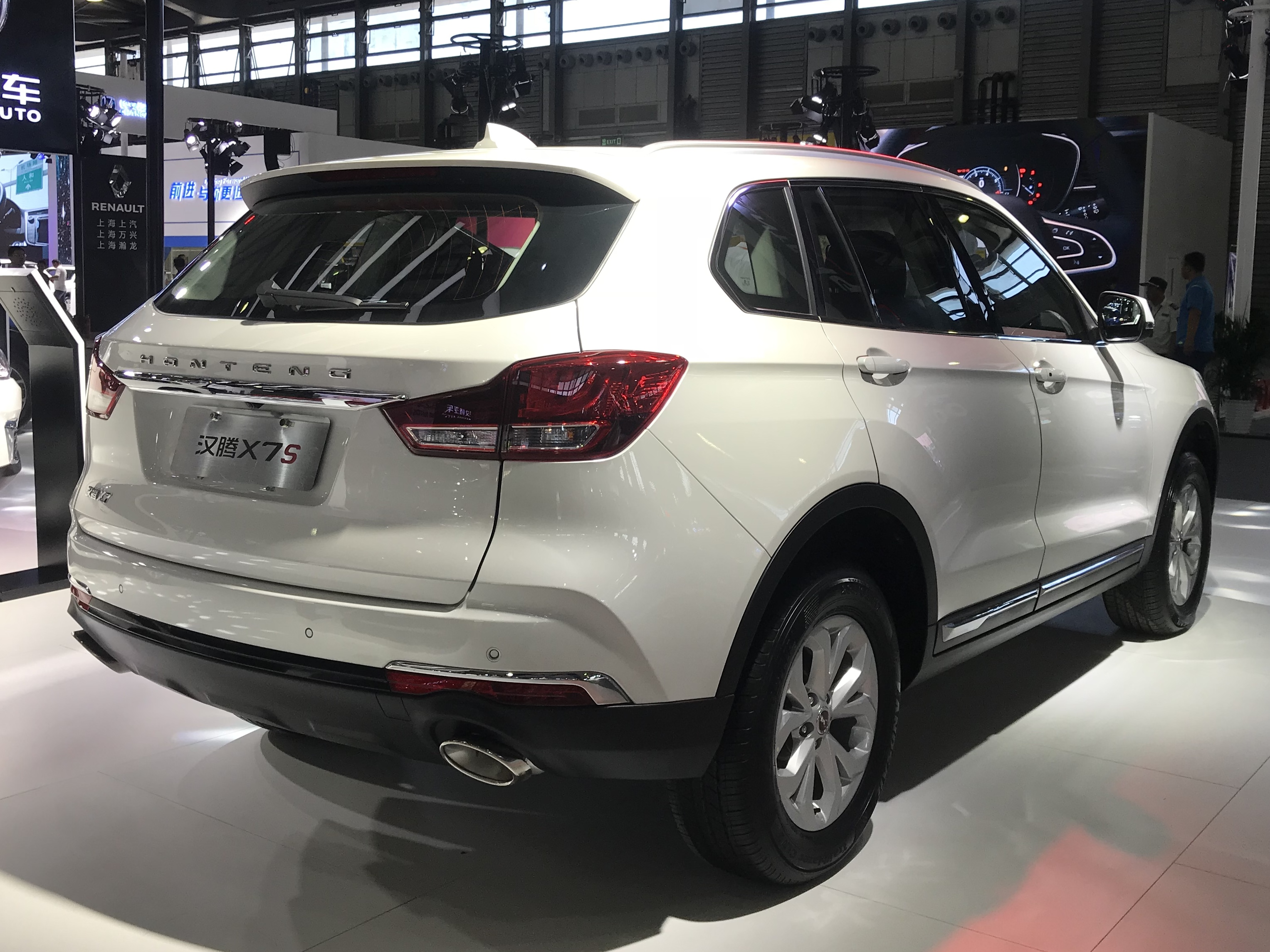
Hanteng X7S
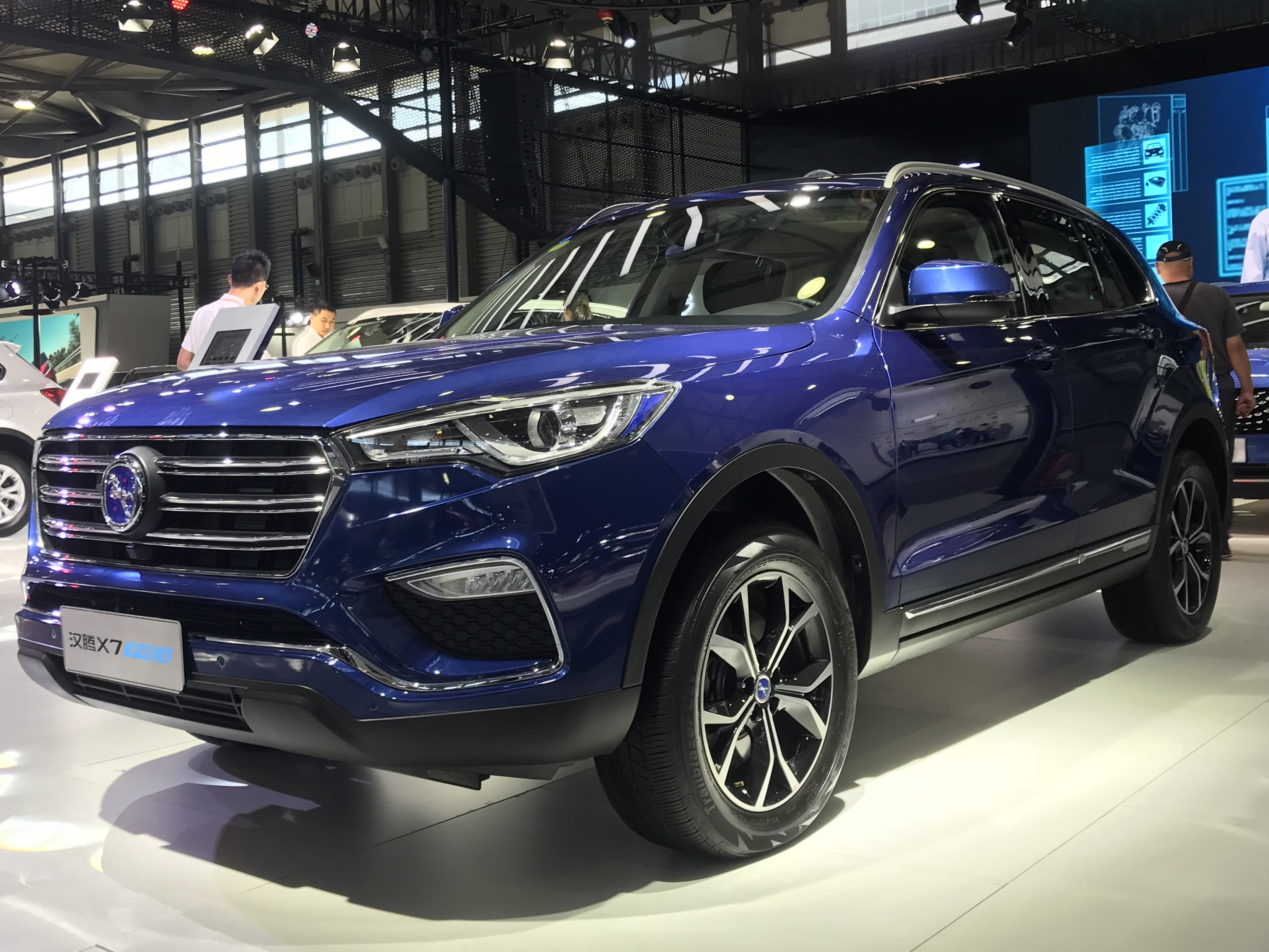
Hanteng X7 PHEV

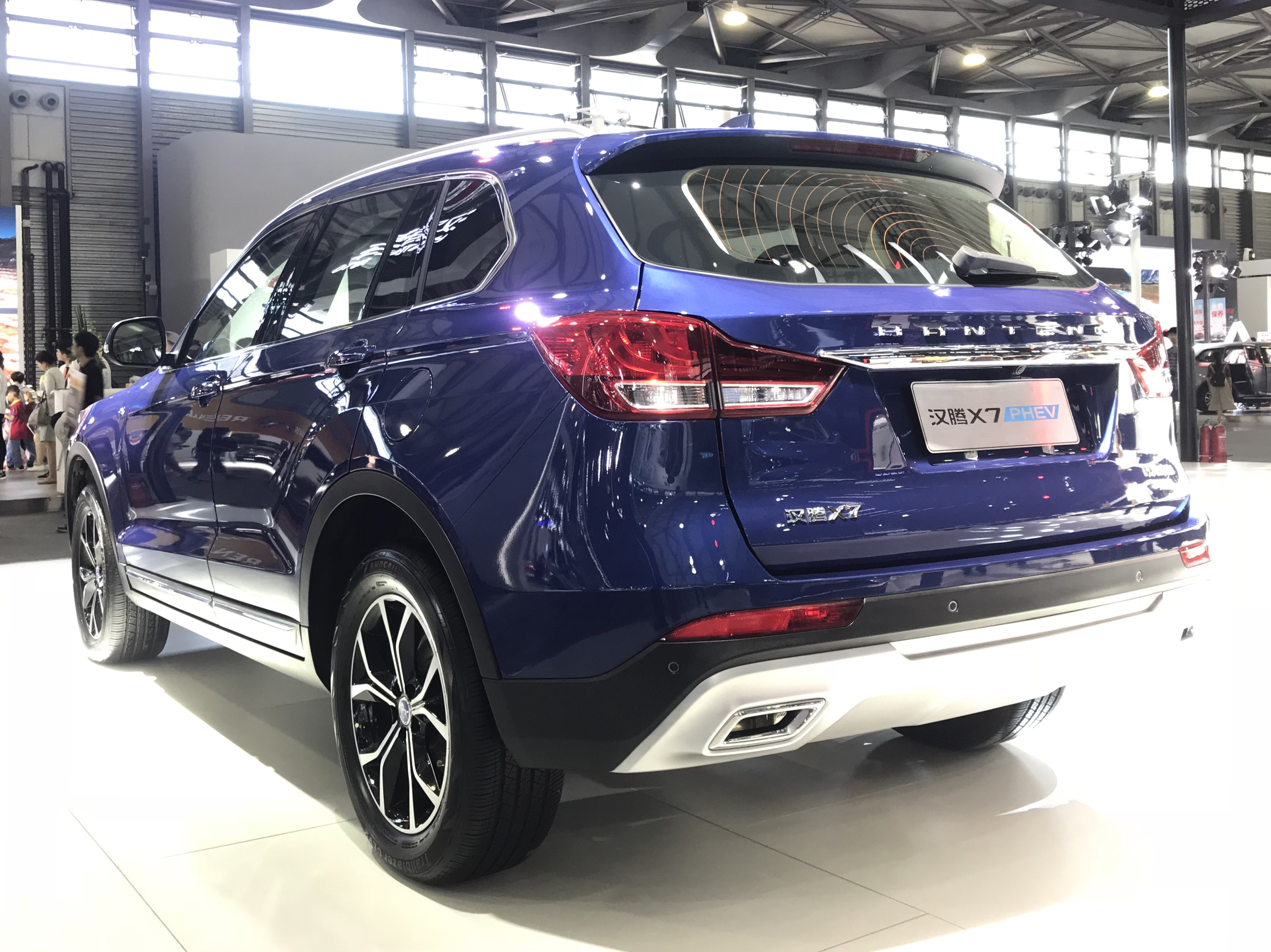
Hanteng X7 PHEV
