= Landwind Rongyao =

Chinese compact crossover SUV

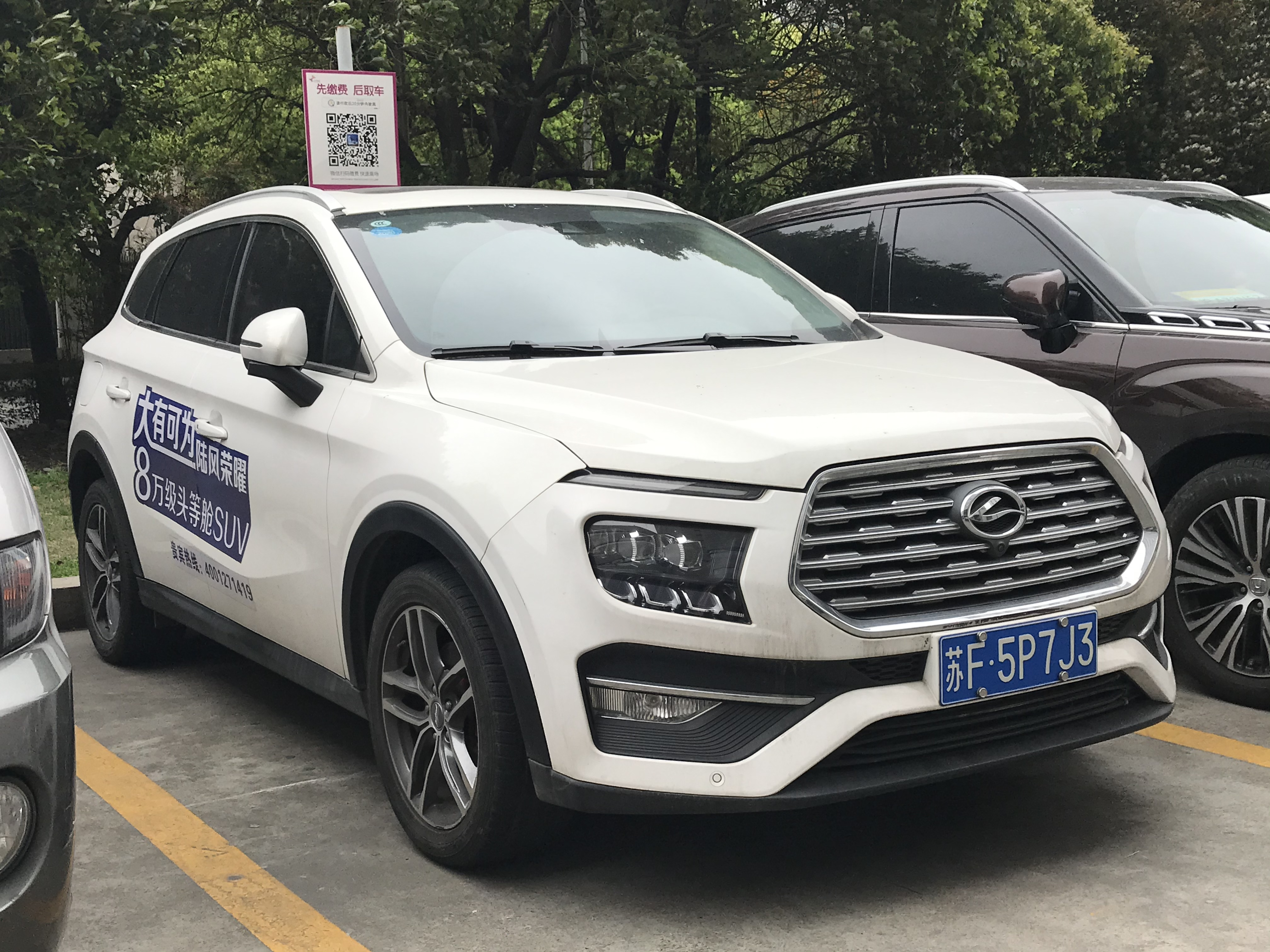

Overview
- Manufacturer: Landwind
- Also called: Landwind E315
- Production: 2019–2021
- Assembly: China
- Designer: Giorgetto & Fabrizio Giugiaro (GFG Style)

Body and chassis
- Class: Compact crossover SUV (C)
- Body style: 5-door SUV

Powertrain
- Engine: Petrol: 1.5 L I4 turbo
- Transmission: 6-speed manual; 7-speed dual-clutch

Dimensions
- Wheelbase: 2,750 mm (108 in)
- Length: 4,550 mm (179 in)
- Width: 1,885 mm (74.2 in)
- Height: 1,650 mm (65 in)

Chronology
- Predecessor: Landwind X7

The Landwind Rongyao (荣曜) is a compact crossover SUV produced by Chinese car manufacturer Landwind from 2019 to 2021.

== Overview ==
Codename E315 during development phase, the Landwind Rongyao debuted during the 2019 Shanghai Auto Show.

The Landwind Rongyao is equipped with a 1.5-liter turbocharged inline-4 engine mated to either a 6-speed manual transmission or a 7-speed dual-clutch transmission.

Designed by Giorgetto and Fabrizio Giugiaro (GFG Style), the Landwind Rongyao compact CUV was positioned above the Landwind Xiaoyao compact CUV and replacing the Landwind X7 compact CUV due to Landwind X7 received worldwide media attention because of the car's resemblance to the Range Rover Evoque, a Chinese court ruled that Landwind had copied five unique design elements and ordered a cease of production and sales immediately, in addition to paying Jaguar Land Rover compensation.

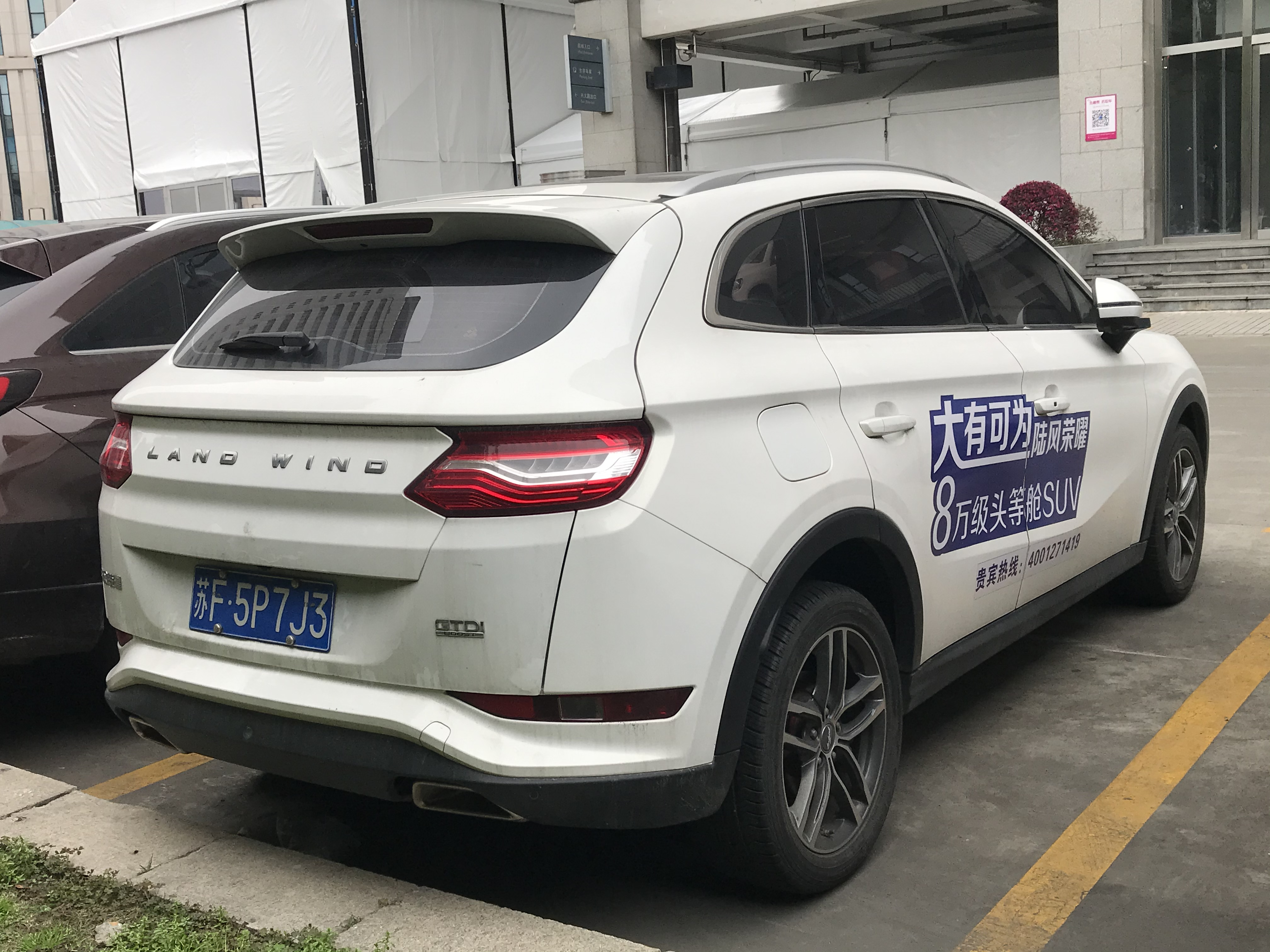
Landwind Rongyao rear
