= Jiangling =

Jiangling may refer to:

== Places ==
- Jiangling County (江陵县), a county under the jurisdiction of Jingzhou City, China
- Jiangling (江陵), a historical name of Jingzhou, Hubei, China

== Companies ==
- Jiangling Motors (江铃汽车 or 江铃股份), Chinese automobile manufacturer
- JMCG (江铃集团), Chinese state-owned automotive company
- Jiangling Holdings (江铃控股), Chinese automotive joint venture
