= Landwind CV9 =

Chinese compact MPV

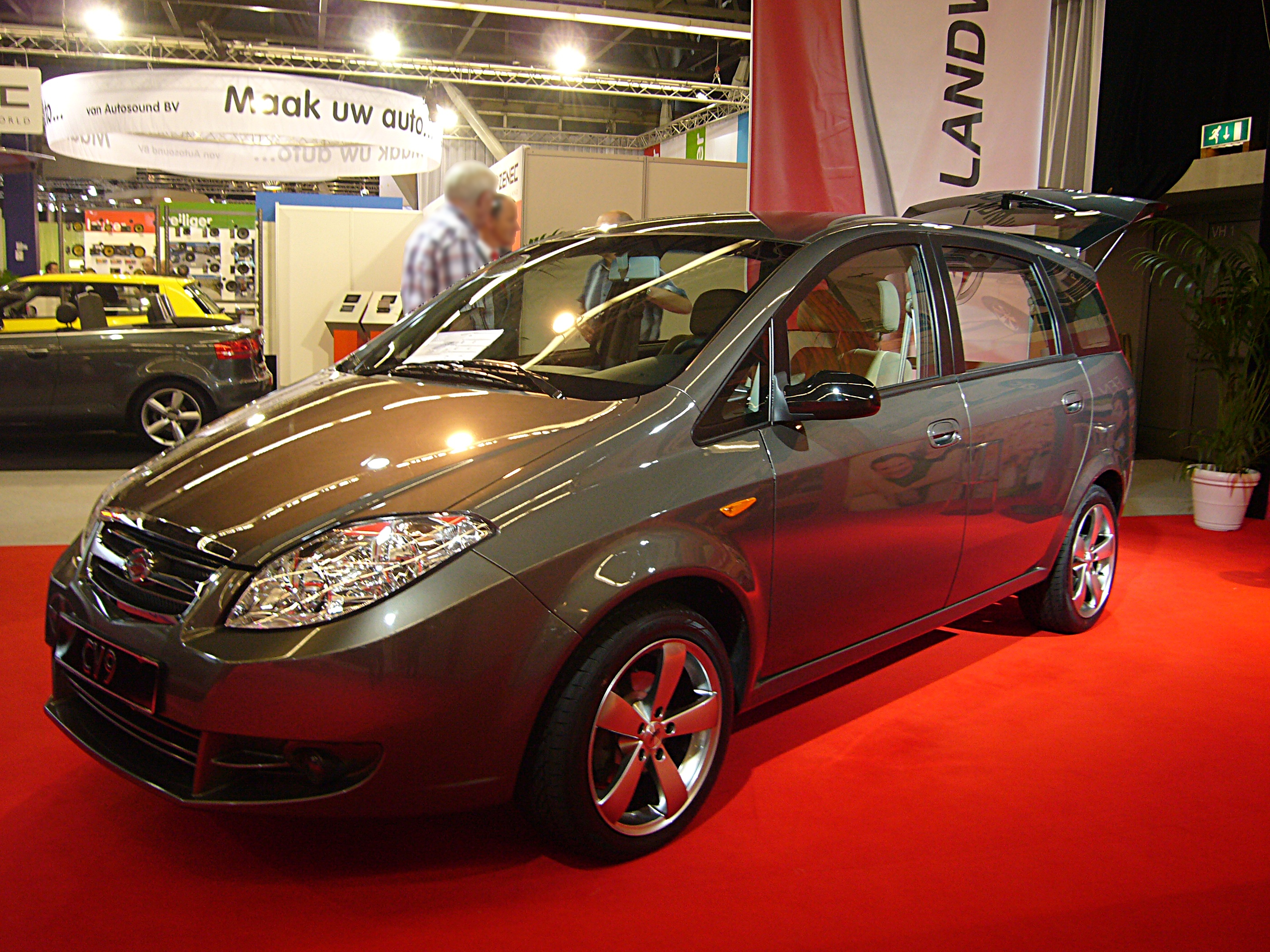

Overview
- Manufacturer: Landwind
- Also called: Landwind Fashion
- Production: 2006–2011

Body and chassis
- Class: Compact MPV
- Body style: 5-door MPV
- Layout: Front-engine, front-wheel-drive layout

Powertrain
- Engine: 1.6 L I4; 2.0 L I4
- Transmission: 5-speed manual

Dimensions
- Wheelbase: 2,710 mm
- Length: 4,410 mm
- Width: 1,768 mm
- Height: 1,640 mm
- Curb weight: 1,260–1,350 kg

The Landwind CV9, sometimes also called Landwind Fashion, is a compact MPV produced by the Chinese manufacturer Landwind.

== Overview ==
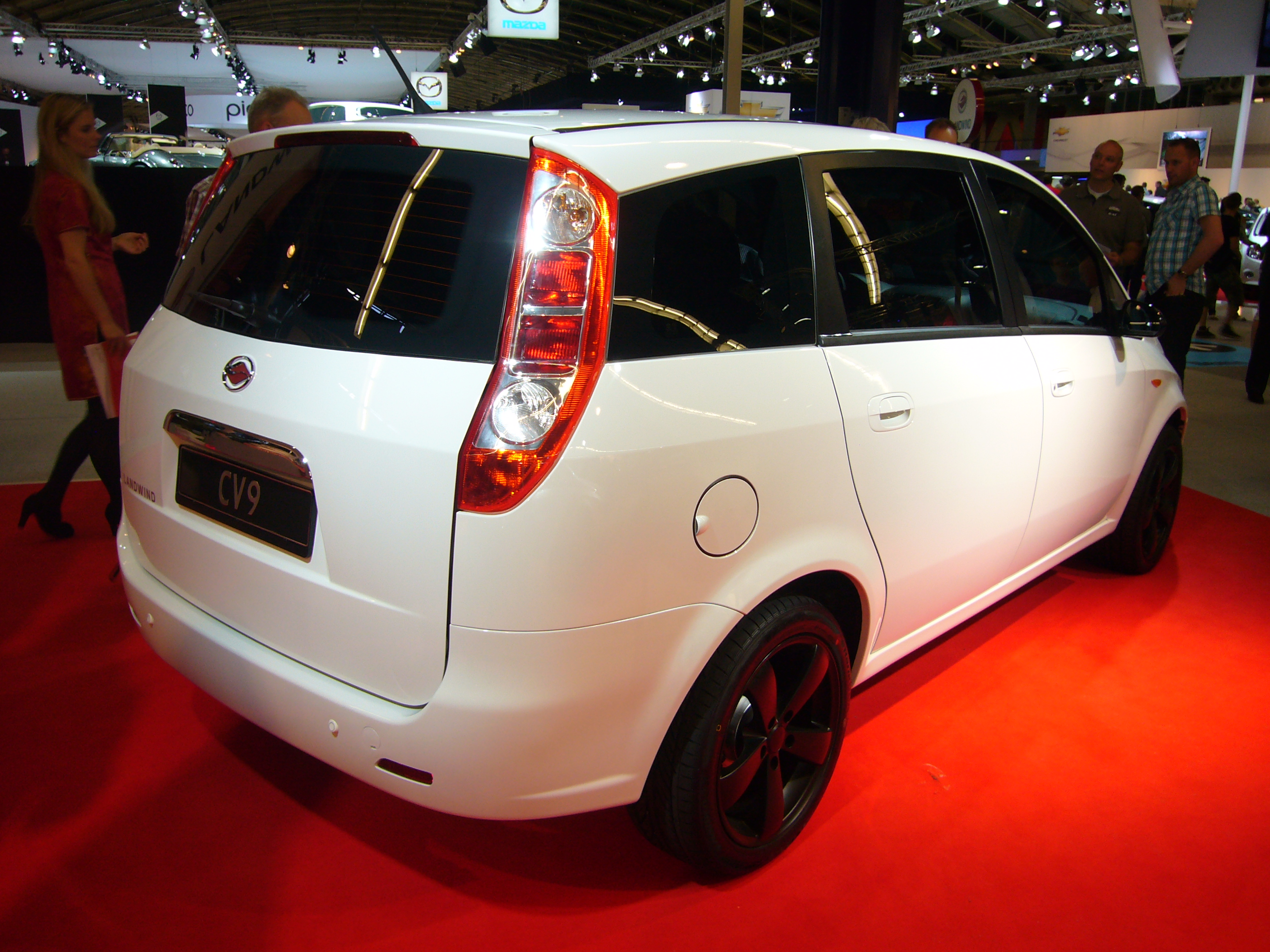
Landwind CV9 (rear quarter)

After the Jiangling Landwind and Landwind GS6, the car is the third attempt by the Chinese manufacturer to gain a foothold in the European market. The vehicle is again in the specialist press, especially in the context of a comparatively poor crash test result with two out of five stars. However, this result is mainly due to the very rudimentary safety equipment as standard, while earlier vehicles from Chinese manufacturers mostly also showed massive structural weaknesses. Side airbags are optionally available for the vehicle, which is why they were not used in the test.

The basic version of the vehicle is offered with a 71 kW (95 hp; 97 PS) 1.6 L petrol engine or a 102 kW (137 hp; 139 PS) 2.0 engine, both paired with a 5-speed manual transmission, and an electric version was planned. The basic version was approved in 2011 by Kraftfahrt-Bundesamt under HSN/TSN 1568 / AAA; in liability insurance, the vehicle was classified for 2012 in the middle type class 17.
