= Landwind X5 =

Chinese compact crossover SUV

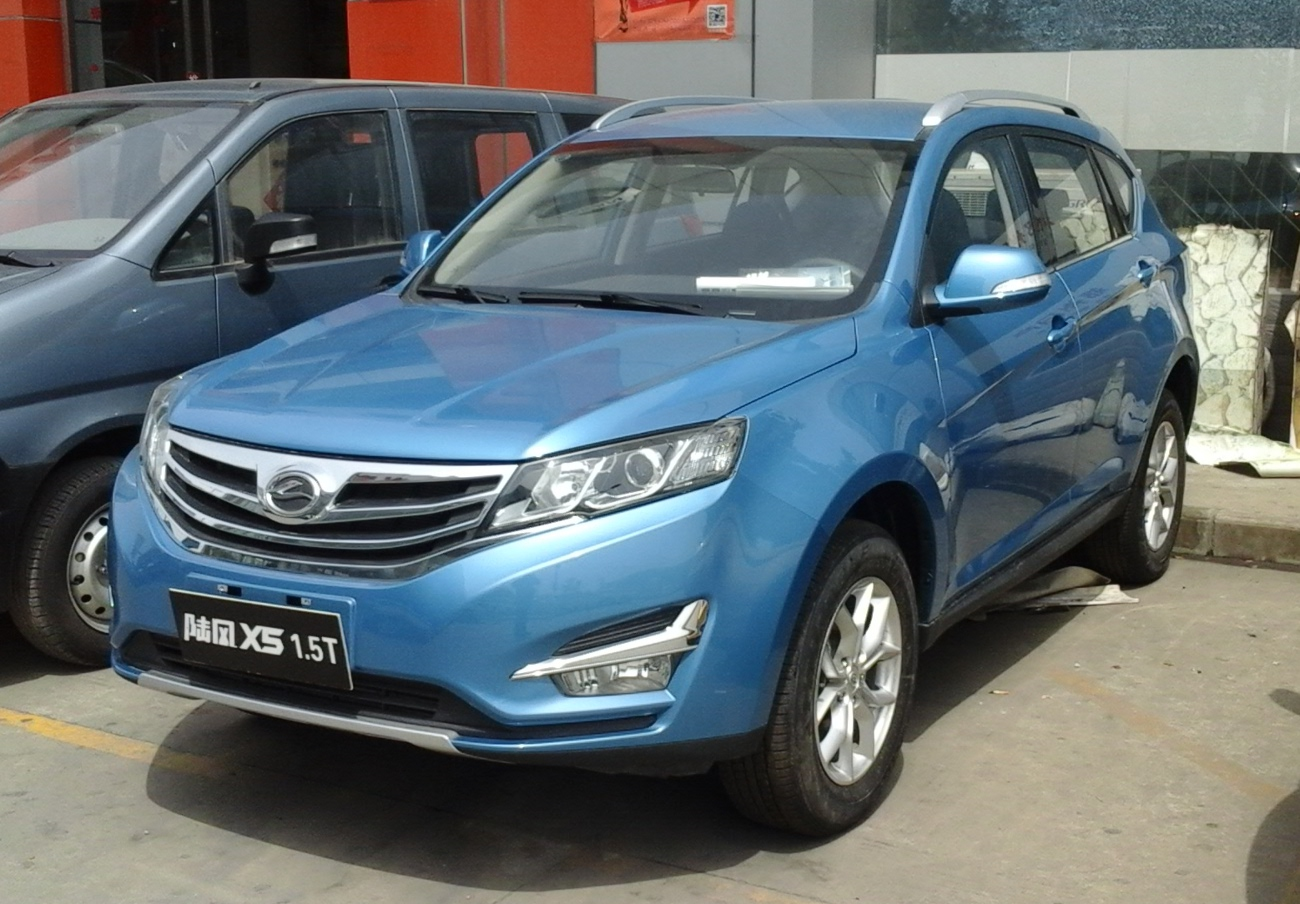
- Landwind X5 Plus

Overview
- Manufacturer: Landwind
- Also called: Landwind X5 Plus
- Production: 2012–2020
- Model years: 2013–2020

Body and chassis
- Class: Compact crossover SUV
- Body style: 5-door wagon
- Layout: Front-engine, front-wheel-drive layout four-wheel-drive

Powertrain
- Engine: 2.0 L turbo I4; 2.0 L turbo I4 (gasoline)
- Transmission: 6-speed manual; 8-speed automatic gearbox

Dimensions
- Wheelbase: 2,665 mm (104.9 in)
- Length: 4,568 mm (179.8 in)
- Width: 1,855 mm (73.0 in)
- Height: 1,680 mm (66.1 in)

This Landwind X5 is a compact crossover SUV produced by Chinese automaker Landwind, it debuted during the 2012 Guangzhou Auto Show in China.

== Overview ==
The Landwind X5 was launched on the Chinese car market in January 2013 with prices starting from 99,800 yuan and ends at 115,800 yuan.

=== Specifications ===
The Landwind X5 is powered by a 2.0L turbo with 190 hp and 250 nm of torque and mated to an 8-speed automatic with standard front wheel drive and optional four wheel drive.

=== Facelift ===
A mid-cycle facelift was conducted later and the facelift was named the Landwind X5 Plus, replacing the regular Landwind X5 in its place.

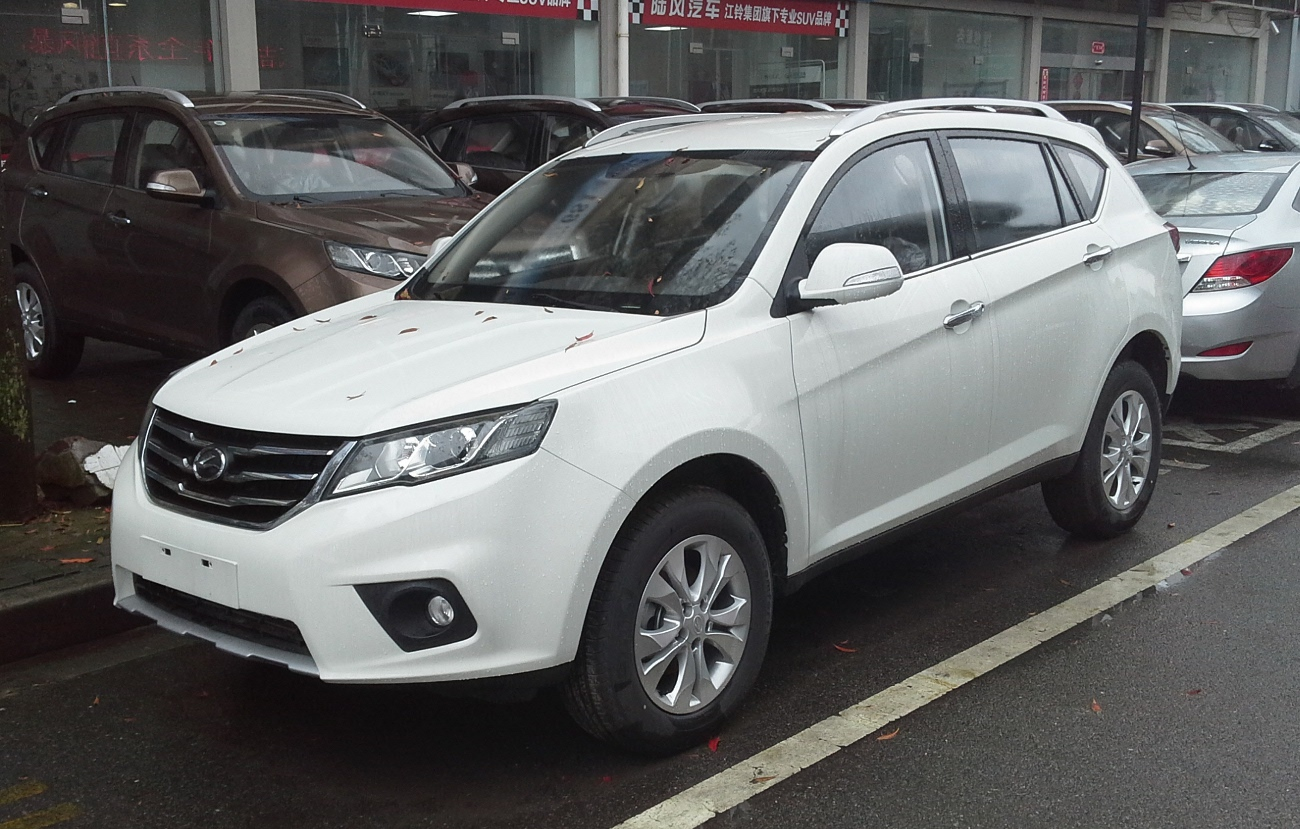
Landwind X5 front

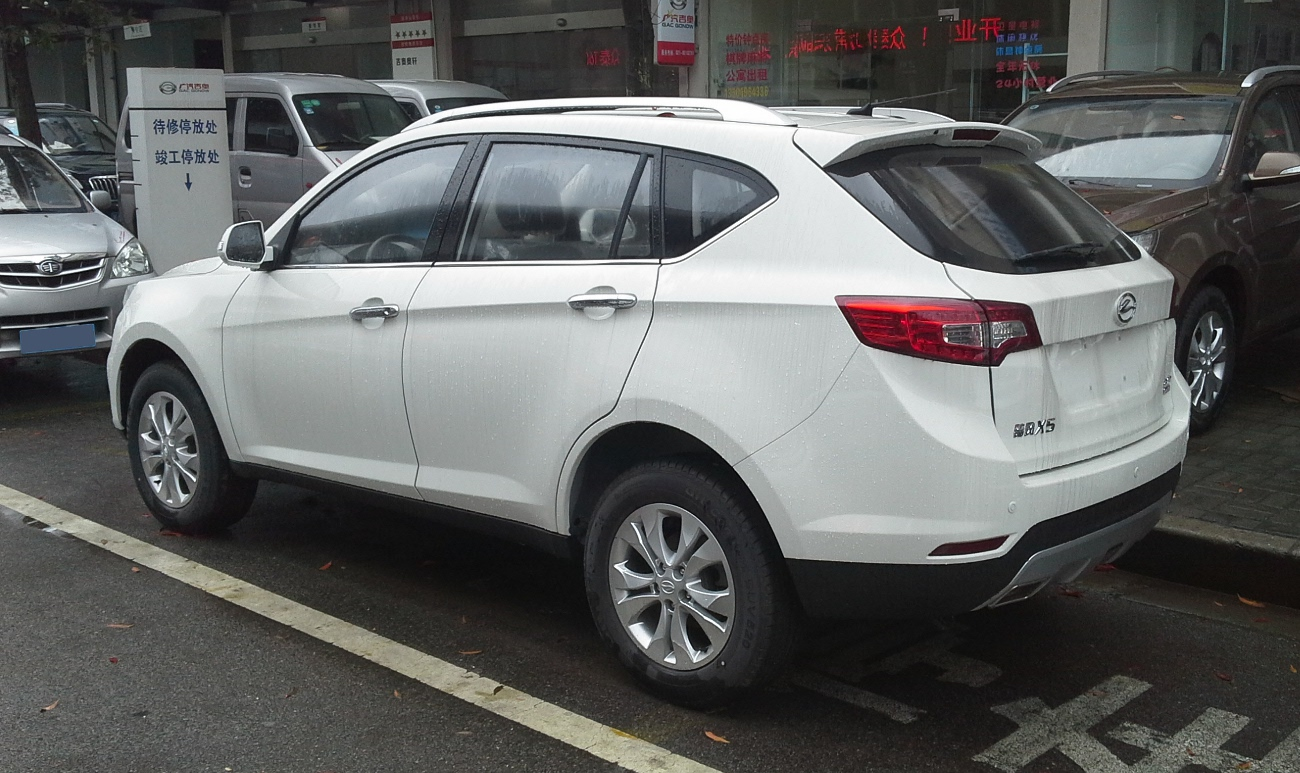
Landwind X5 rear

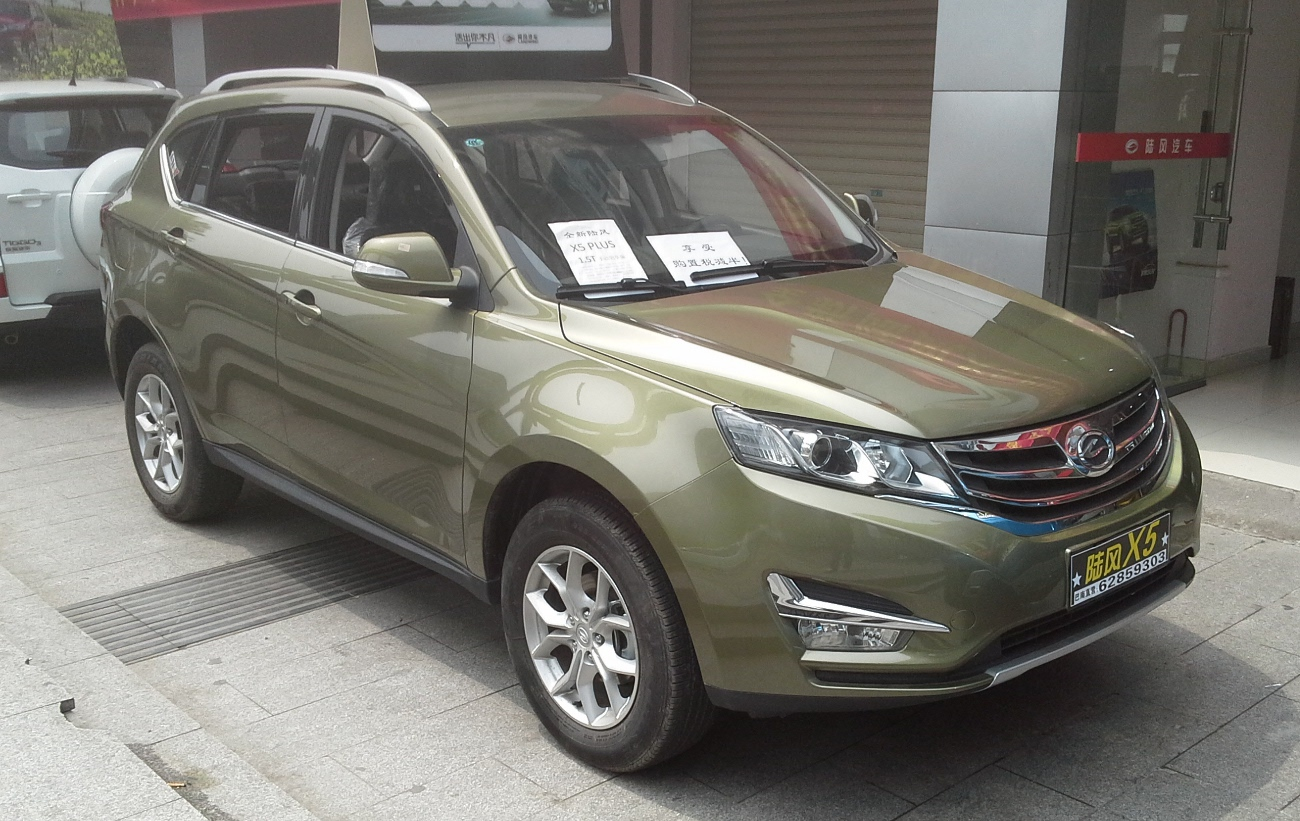
Landwind X5 Plus front

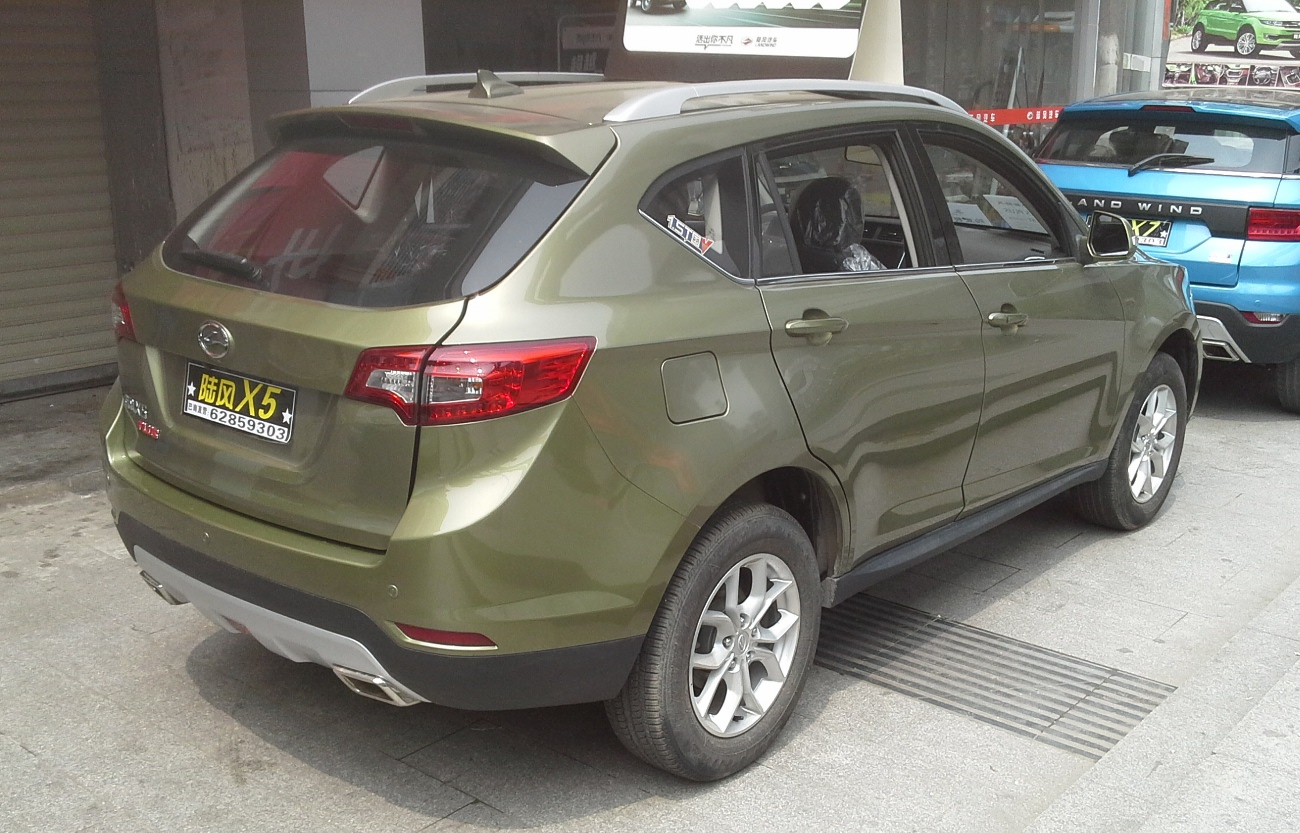
Landwind X5 Plus rear
