= Landwind X8 =

Chinese mid-size SUV

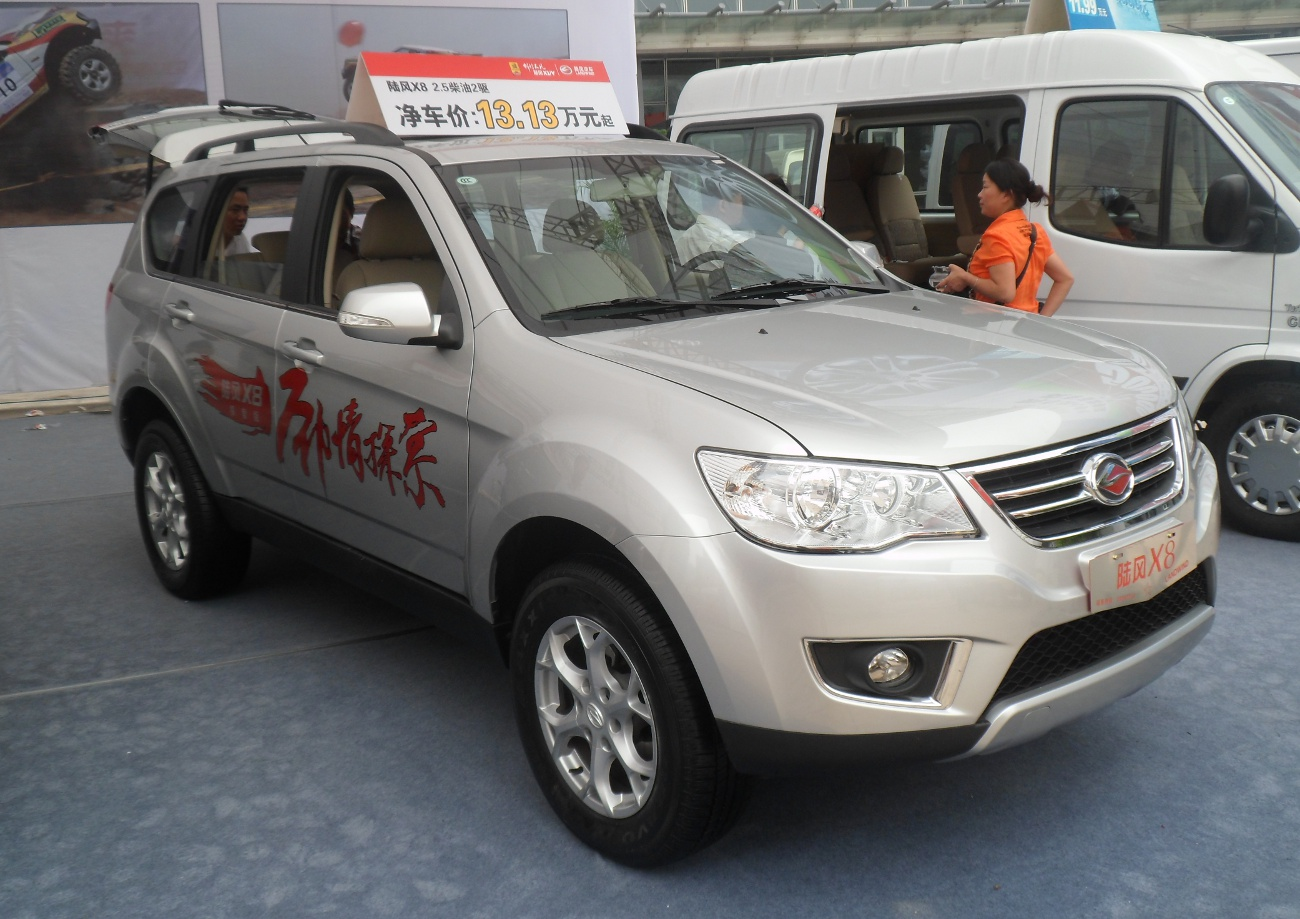

Overview
- Manufacturer: Landwind
- Production: 2009–2020

Body and chassis
- Class: Mid-size SUV
- Body style: 5-door wagon
- Layout: Front-engine, rear-wheel-drive Front-engine, four-wheel-drive

Powertrain
- Engine: 2.5 L VM R425, 4C, 16V, DOHC I4 (diesel); 2.4 L Mitsubishi 4G69 MIVEC, 4C, 16V I4 (petrol)
- Transmission: 5-speed manual

Dimensions
- Wheelbase: 2,760 mm (108.7 in)
- Length: 4,636 mm (182.5 in)
- Width: 1,865 mm (73.4 in)
- Height: 1,810 mm (71.3 in)

The Landwind X8 is a mid-size SUV produced by Chinese automaker Jiangling Motor Holding, a joint venture between Aiways, Changan Auto and Jiangling Motors Corporation Group (JMCG).

== Overview ==
The Landwind X8 debuted during the 2009 Shanghai Auto Show in April 2009, and went on sale in the second half of 2009. The Landwind X8 SUV has a body-on-frame structure and rear-wheel-drive layout for its off-road capabilities.

Pricing of the Landwind X8 starts from around 150,000 for the 4×2 variant and around 160,000 for the 4×4.

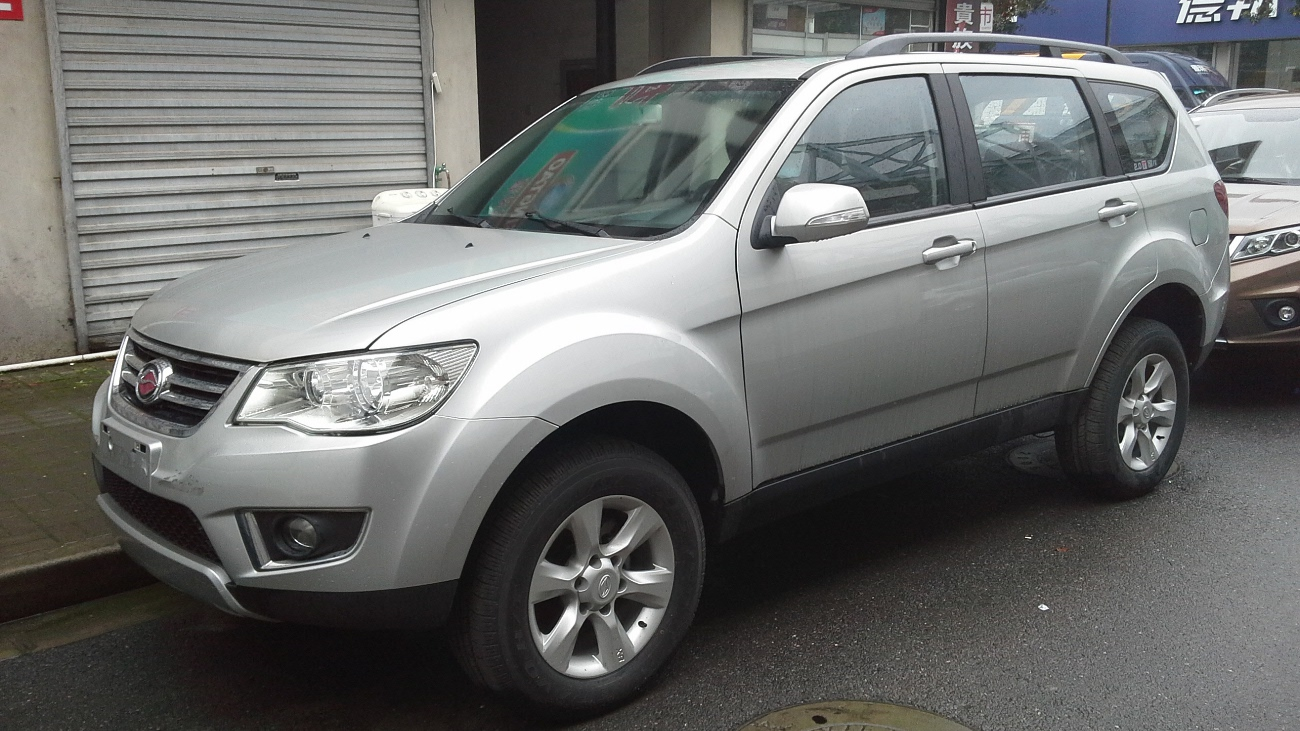
Landwind X8 front.

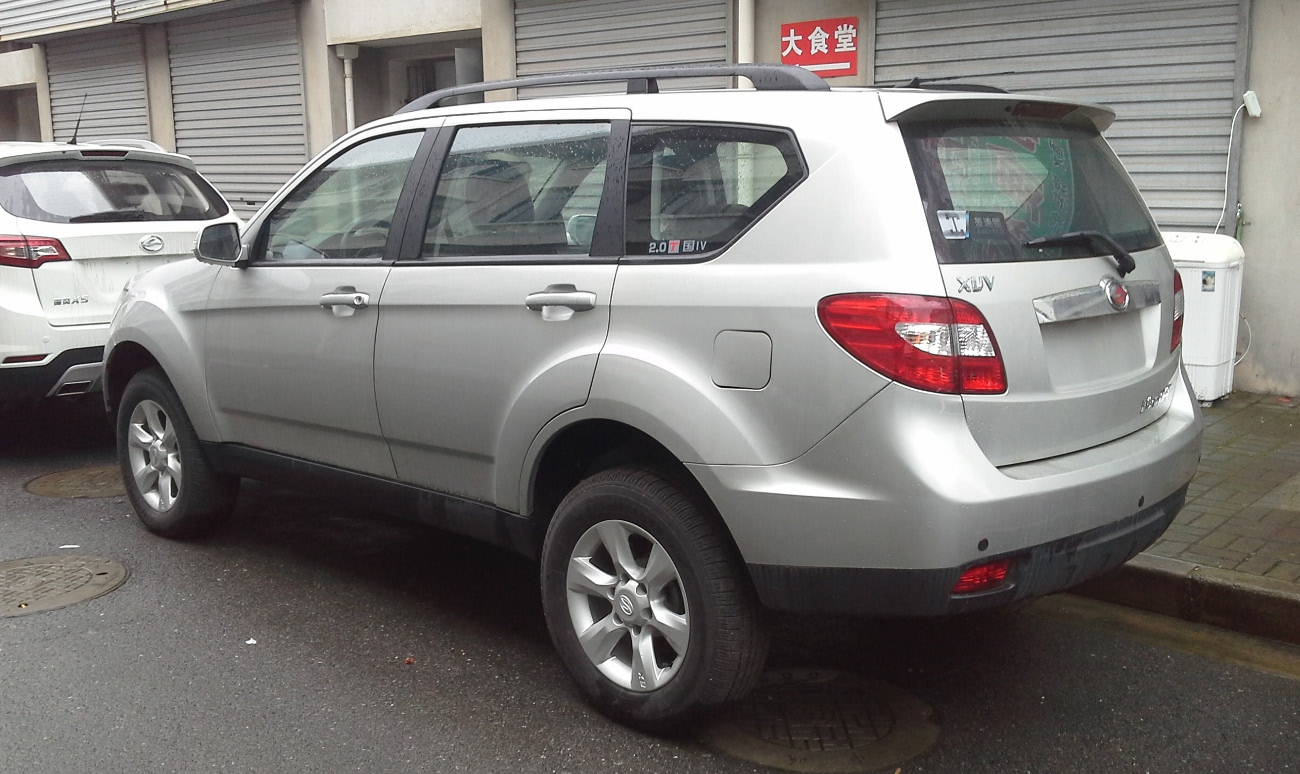
Landwind X8 rear.

=== Specifications ===
At launch, the Landwind X8 is powered by a common-rail turbo diesel sourced from VM Motori from Italy, developing 140HP and 350Nm of torque and a 2.4-liter 4-cylinder gasoline engine sourced from Mitsubishi, developing 150HP. The engines meet the China IV emission standard.

As of 2012, an update introduced the Landwind X8 with a 2.0-liter petrol engine, a 2.4-liter petrol engine, and a 2.5-liter turbo petrol engine. A 2.0-liter turbo diesel engine was added in 2012 producing 140hp and 340nm. The Landwind X8 has a 6-speed automatic gearbox and is working on an 8-speed automatic gearbox for the X8.

As of 2018, there are 8 variants of Landwind X8 available, with 2 engine options including the 1.8-liter turbo engine and 2.0-liter turbo engine, with both engines mated to a manual transmission. The maximum engine power is 130.0kW, maximum horsepower is 177PS, and maximum torque is 320.0N·m.
