= Landwind =

Chinese automotive manufacturer

- Type: Joint venture
- Industry: Automotive
- Founded: 2004
- Defunct: 2022
- Fate: Bankruptcy
- Area served: China
- Products: Automobiles
- Owner: Jiangling Motor Holding

Chinese name
- Simplified Chinese: 陆风
- Traditional Chinese: 陸風
- Literal meaning: Landwind
Transcriptions
Standard Mandarin
- Hanyu Pinyin: Lùfēng
- Wade–Giles: Lu^{4}-fêng^{1}
- IPA: [lufəŋ]
Yue: Cantonese
- Yale Romanization: Luhk fūng
- Jyutping: Luk6 fung1
- Website: landwind.com

Landwind was an automobile marque owned by the Chinese automaker Jiangling Motor Holding (JMH), a joint venture between Jiangxi Guokong Automotive Investment Corporation (50%), Jiangling Motors Corporation Group (25%) and Changan Automobile (25%).

== History ==
=== Creation and early years ===
Landwind traces its origins back to 1998 when the then-chairman of JMCG, Sun Min, established Jiangling Lufeng (Landwind) Automobile Co., Ltd. His intention was to create an independent marque to strengthen JMCG's own technical development and reduce its dependence on Ford and Isuzu. While the cars would be designed by Lufeng, the production would be made on Isuzu's production lines. Ford opposed the project and it eventually was abandoned. Landwinds were on sale by 2002 and the marque was relaunched in November 2004 by Jiangling Motor Holding.

The Landwind X5 debuted at the Guangzhou Auto Show in November 2012.

=== Conflict with JLR ===
In 2005, when Jiangling Motor Holding registered the marque's English-language name as Landwind, Jaguar Land Rover (JLR) lodged a complaint before the European Union, alleging the name was too similar to Land Rover. In 2011, the complaint was dismissed.

In 2016, JLR sued Jiangling Motor Holding at the Beijing Chaoyang District Court for unfair competition and copyright infringement, as it alleged the Landwind X7 design was a copy of the Range Rover Evoque. In 2019, the Court dismissed the copyright infringement case, as both the Jiangling Holding and JLR intellectual property claims in China for the vehicle had been made improperly and were invalid within the country. As for the unfair competition case, the Court ruled in favour of JLR, and the X7s were temporarily banned from being sold and produced in China, although Jiangling Holding could appeal the verdict. Media outlets erroneously reported that JLR had won the copyright infringement case, following a JLR press release, and that the company being sued was Jiangling Motors. Jiangling Motors published a press release denying it was involved in the proceedings. Later, as JLR partially fixed its press release indicating the company it had sued was Jiangling Motor Holding instead of Jiangling Motors, news agency Reuters corrected its newswire on that point, although it did not apologise for not fact-checking JLR's information.

=== End of operations ===
In 2019, Landwind only sold about 1,000 vehicles after a high of 80,000 in 2016. By 2020, production of Landwind-badged vehicles had ceased and the company has stopped its operations. From 2021, the Landwind factory has been transferred to the Changan Automobile, where the previous co-owner of the defunct joint-venture had now started manufacturing of its own model, Raeton CC.

== Products ==
Landwind's range of products had the following models:

- Landwind X2 (2017–2021) – CUV
- Landwind X5 (2013–2021) – CUV
- Landwind X8 (2009–2021) – SUV
- Landwind Xiaoyao (2018–2021) – Compact CUV
- Landwind Rongyao (2019–2021) – Compact CUV
- Landwind X6 (2005–2016) – SUV
- Landwind X7 (2015–2019) – CUV
- Landwind X9 (2001–2009) – SUV
- Landwind CV9 (2005–2011) – Compact MPV
- Landwind Forward (2006–2011) – Sedan

Landwind products in development included a large SUV codenamed E32 planned to be positioned above the Landwind X5 and originally intended for launch in China in 2014.

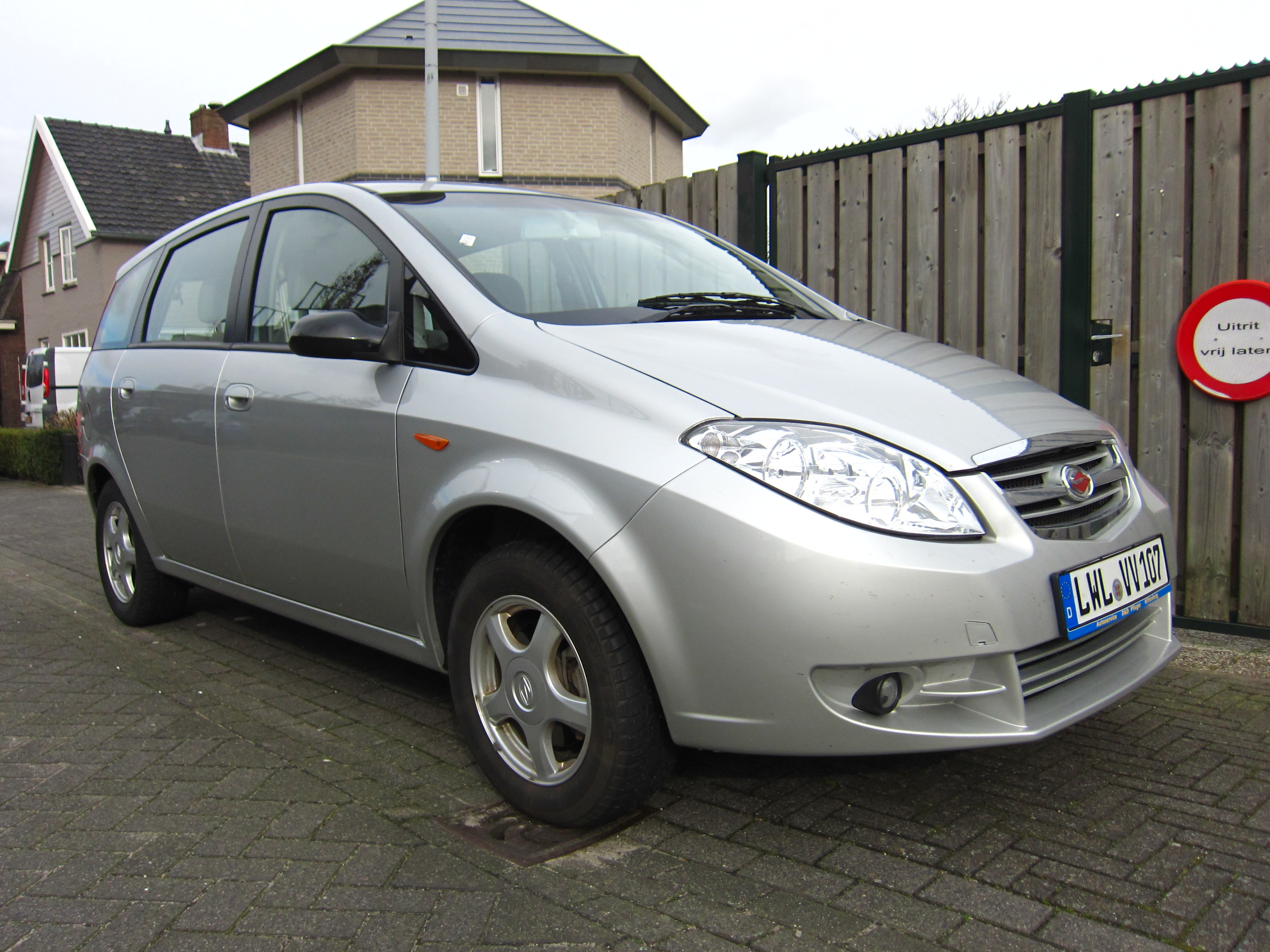
Landwind CV9

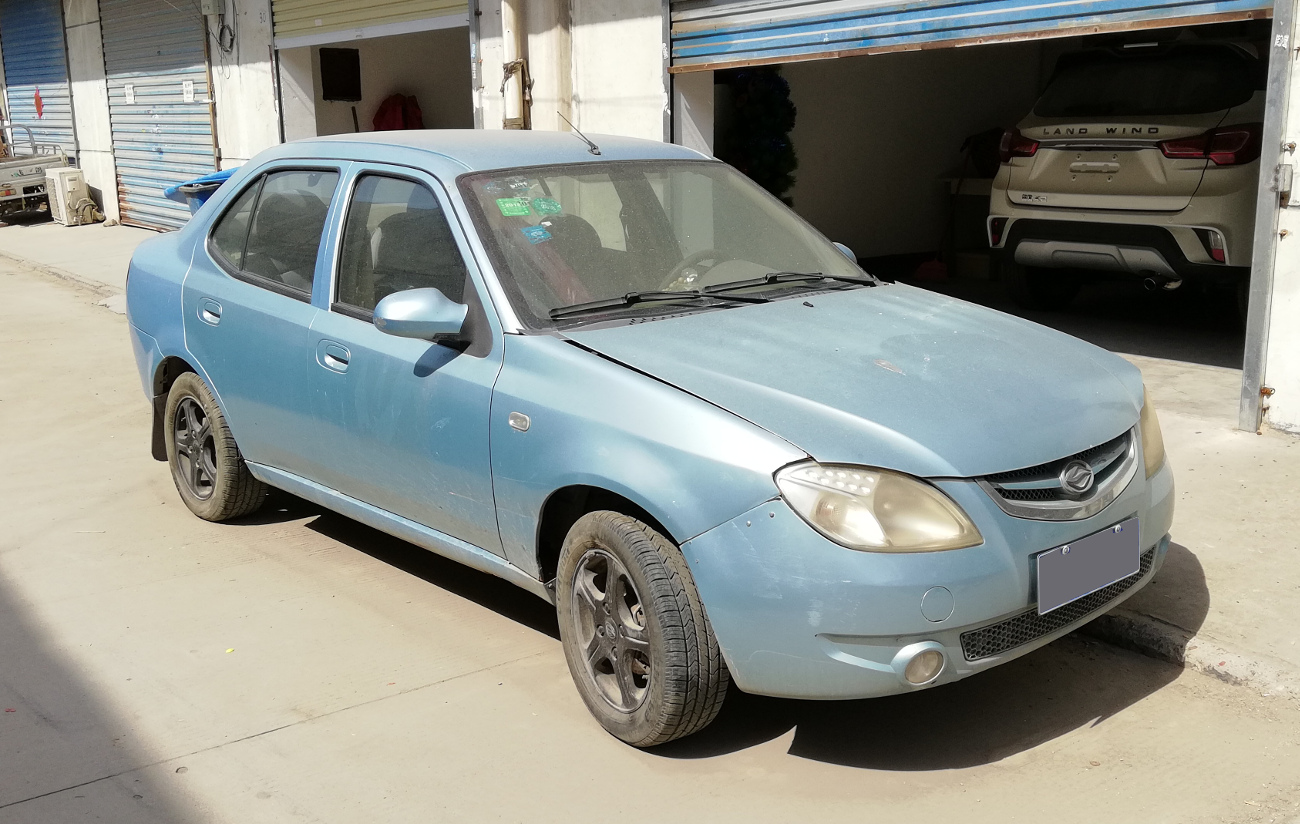
Landwind Forward

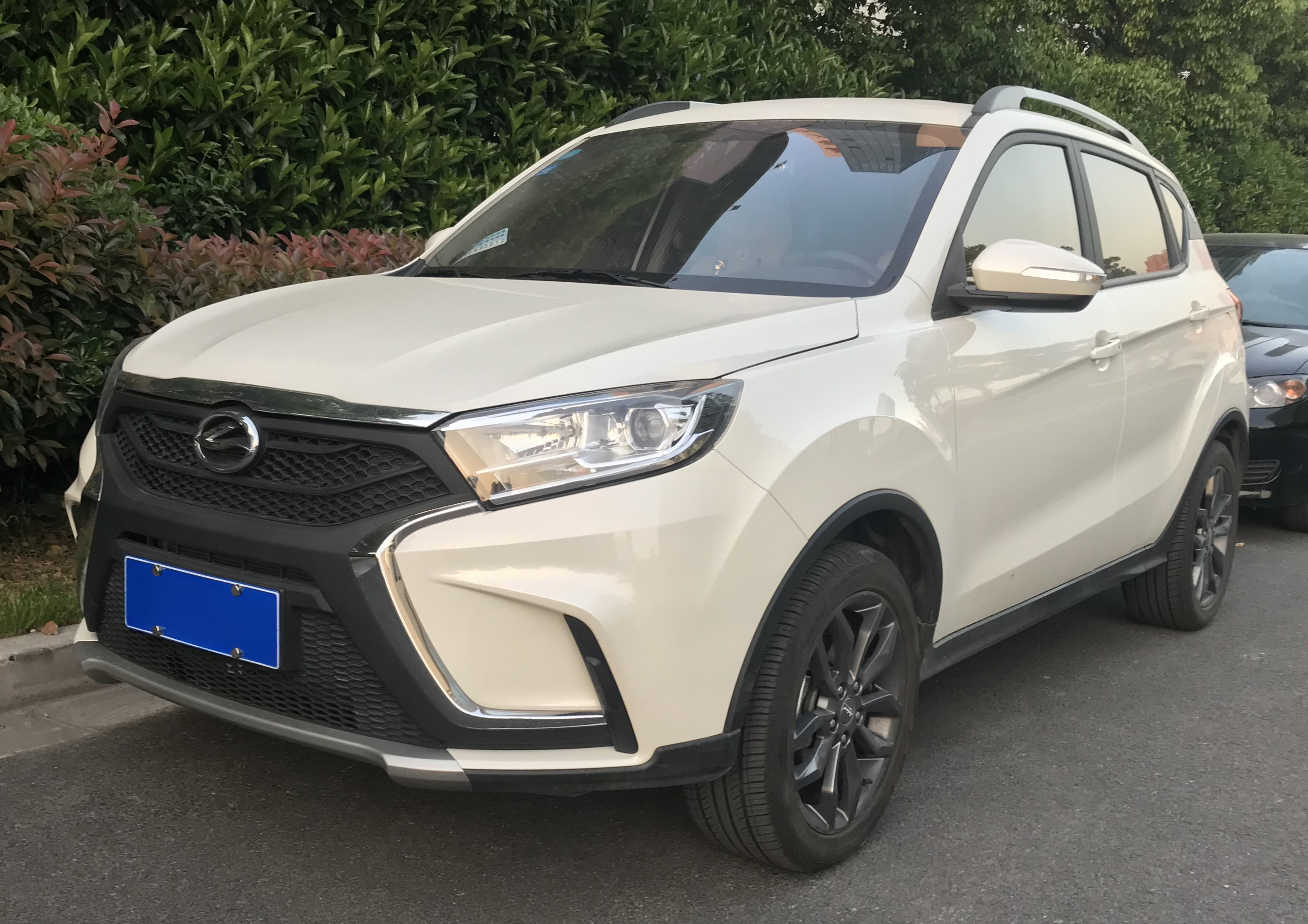
Landwind X2

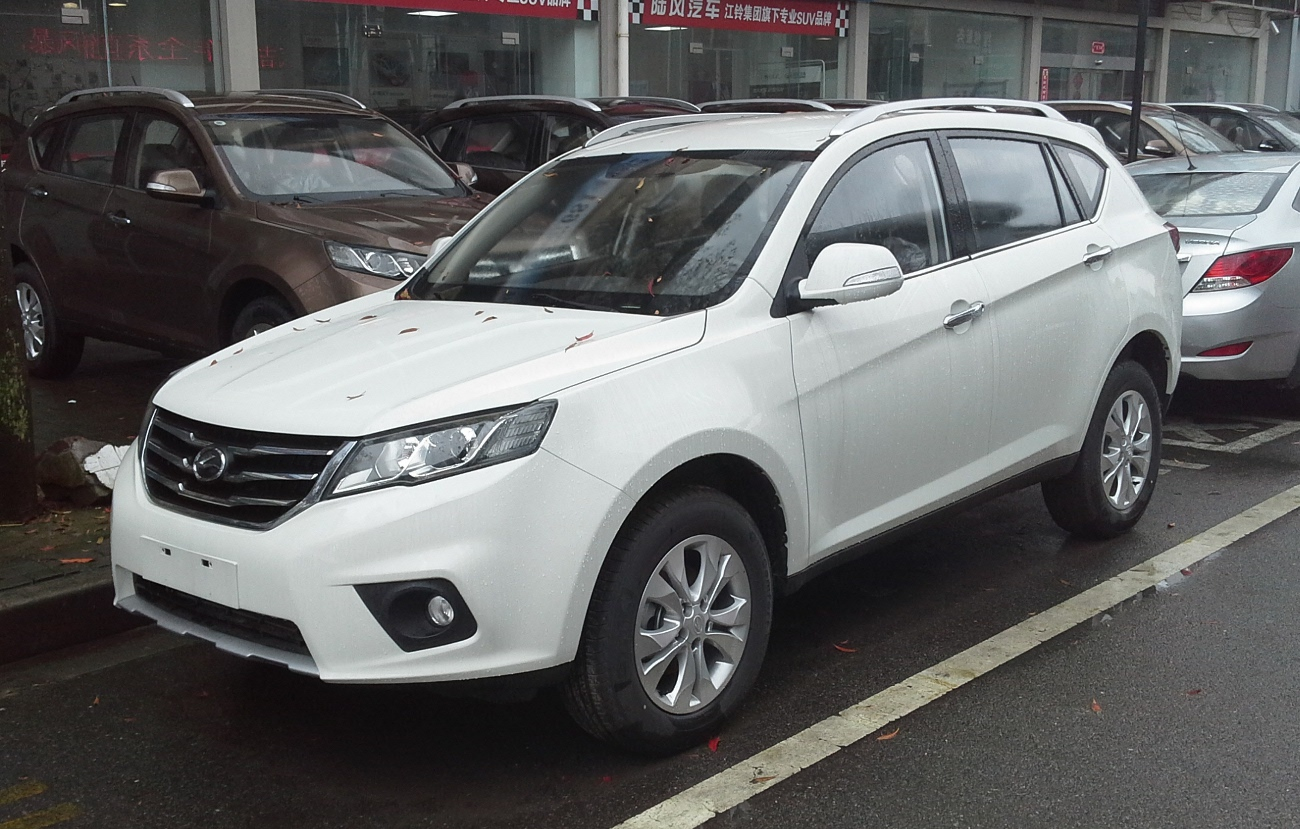
Landwind X5

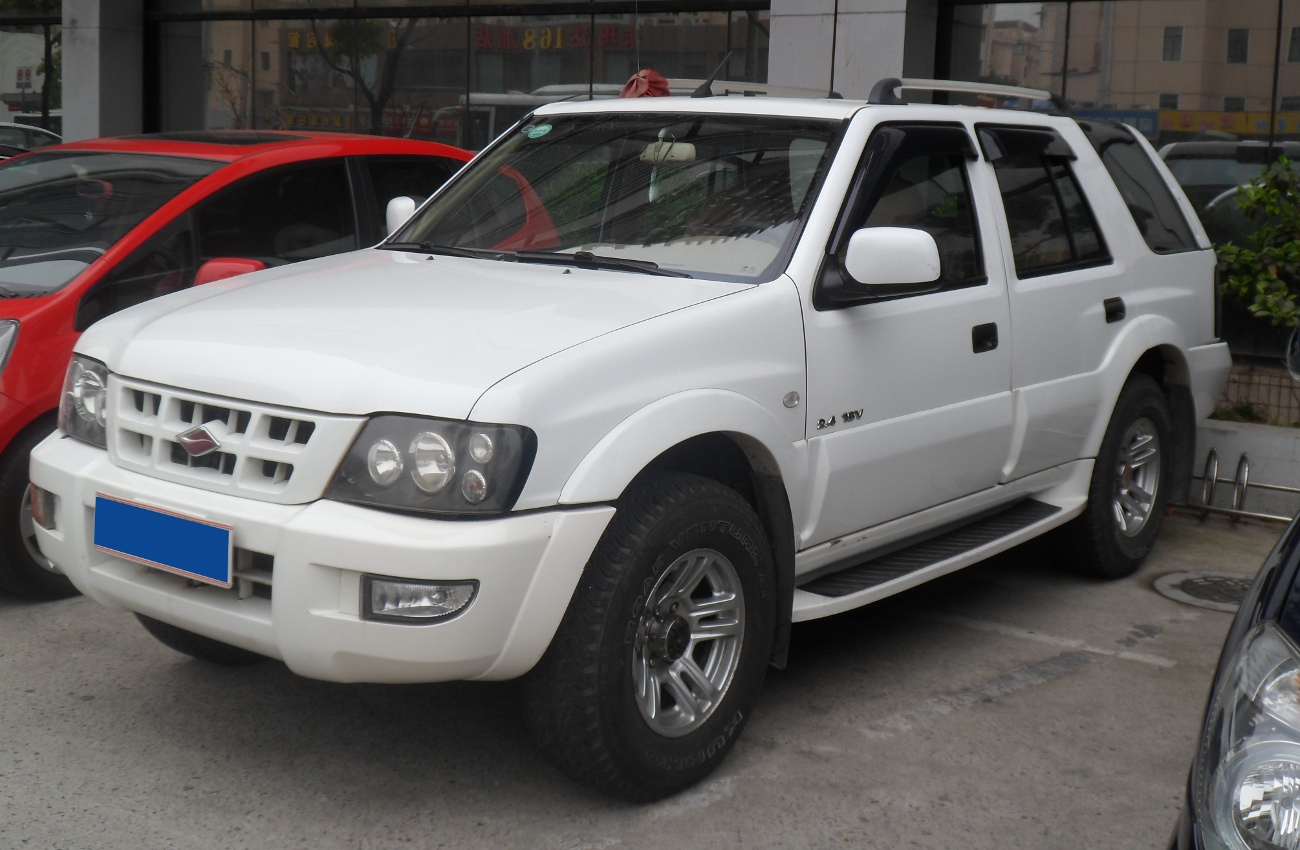
Landwind X6

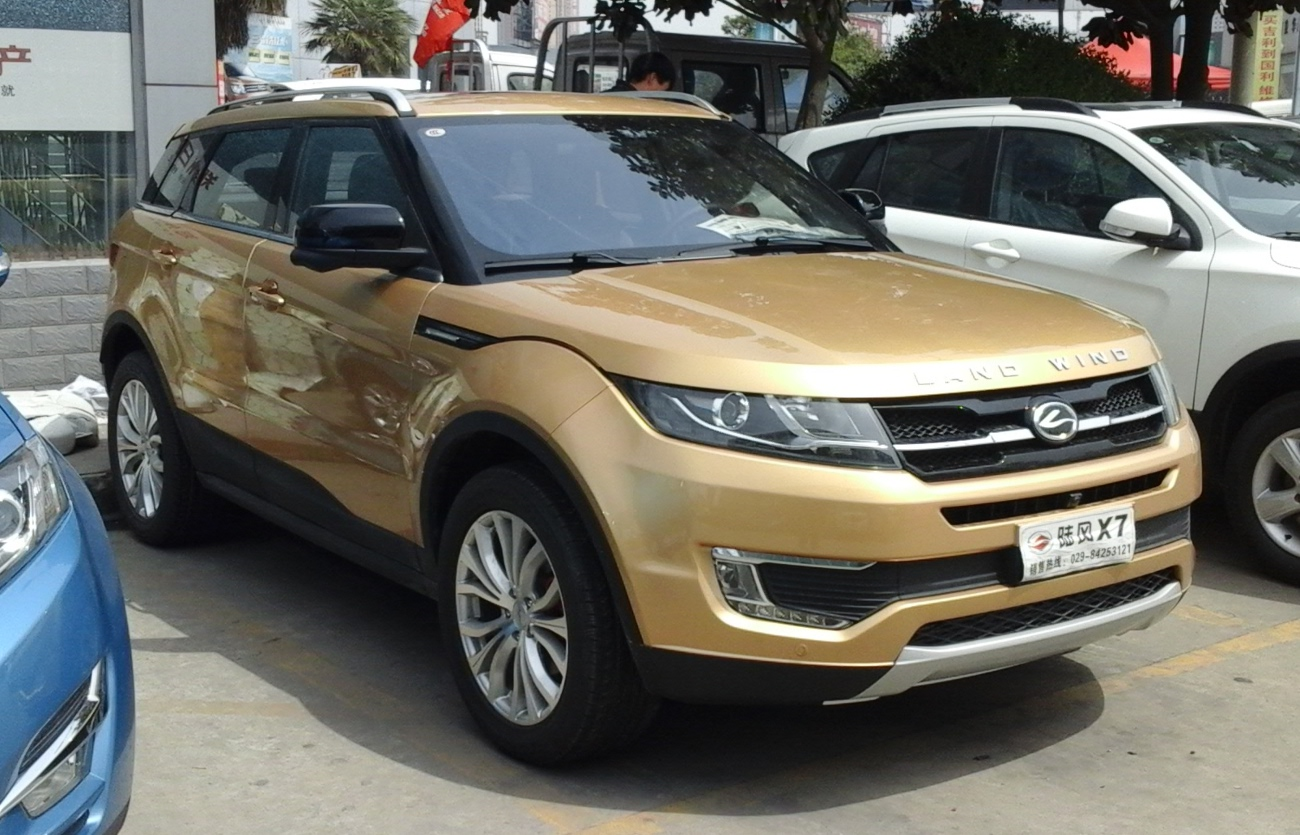
Landwind X7

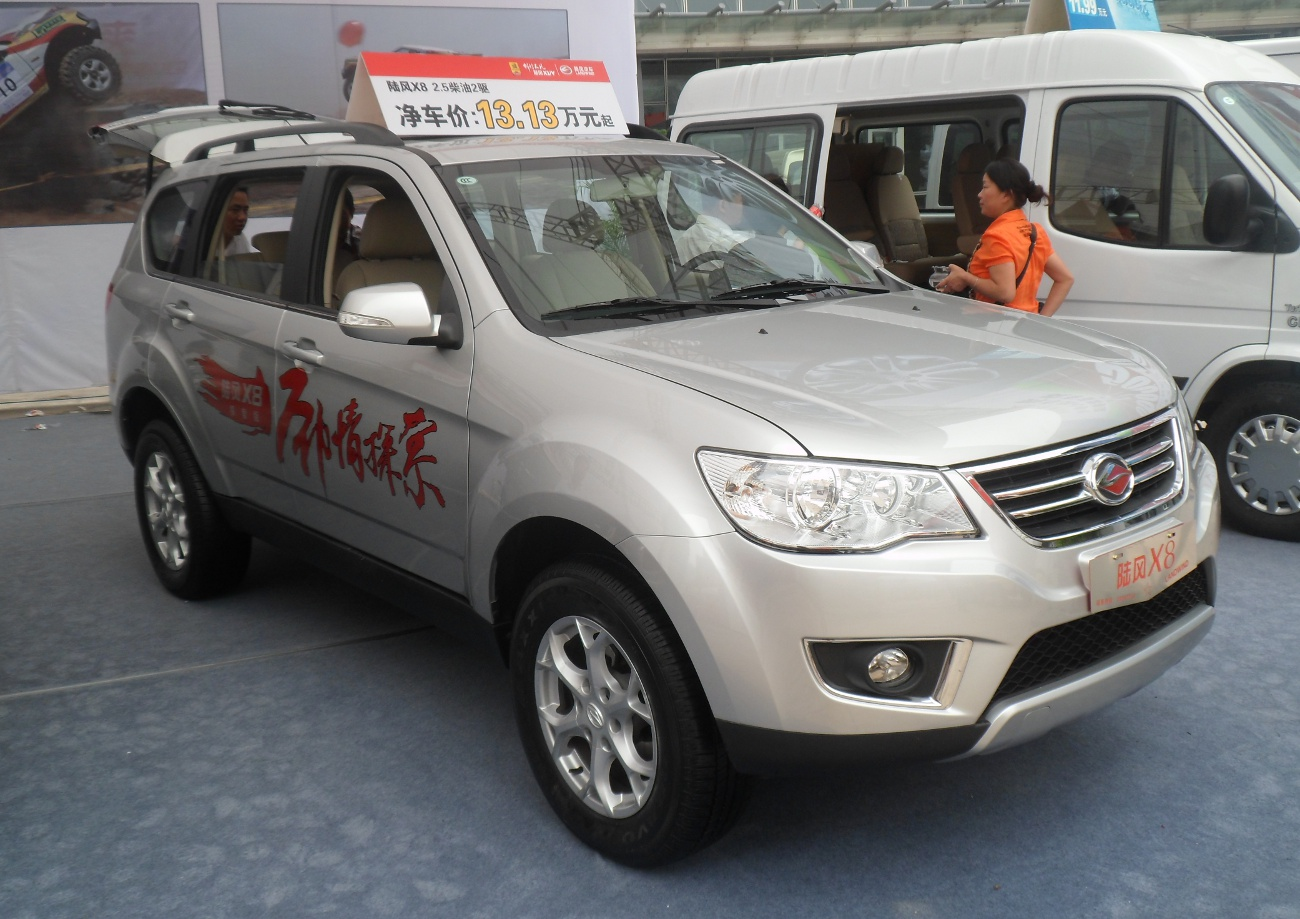
Landwind X8

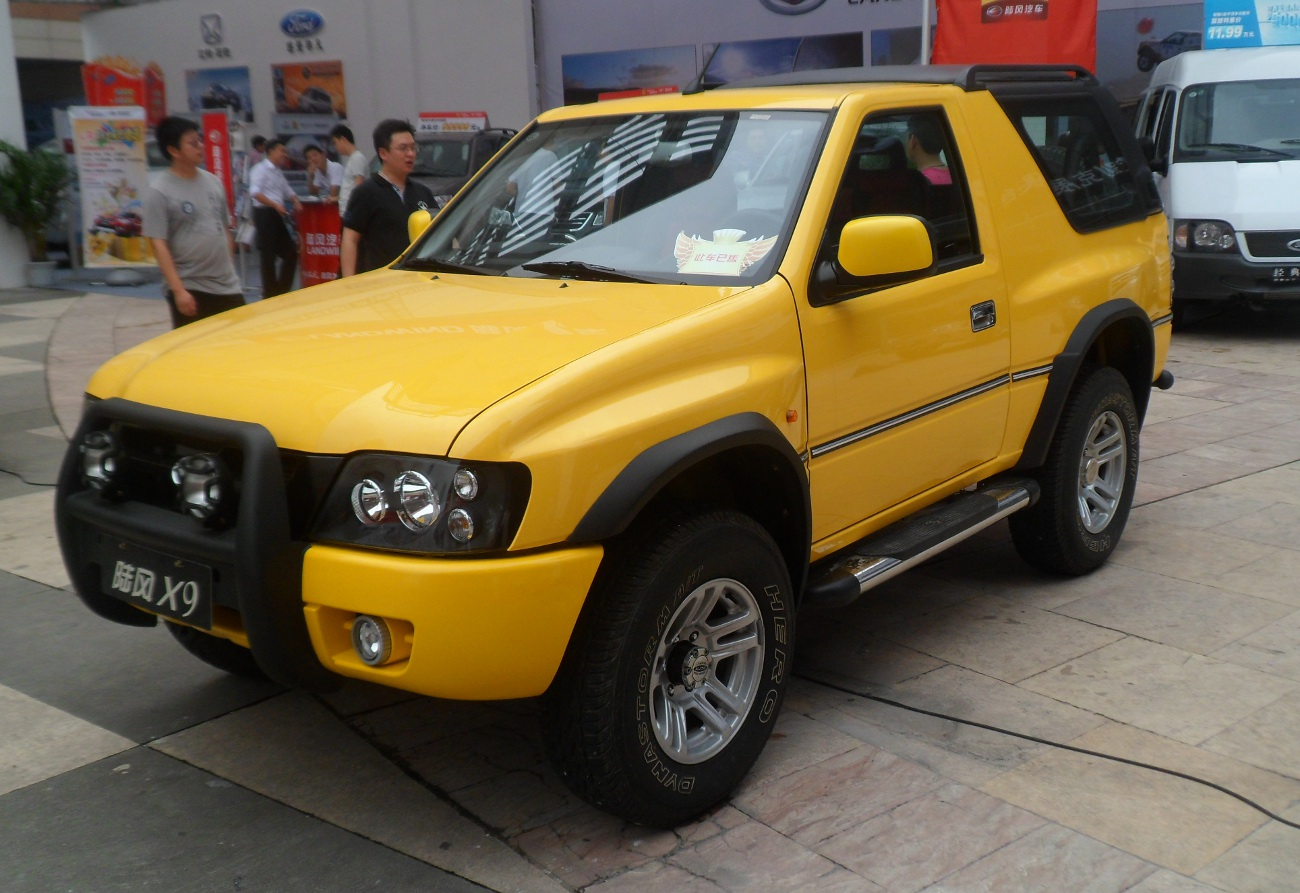
Landwind X9

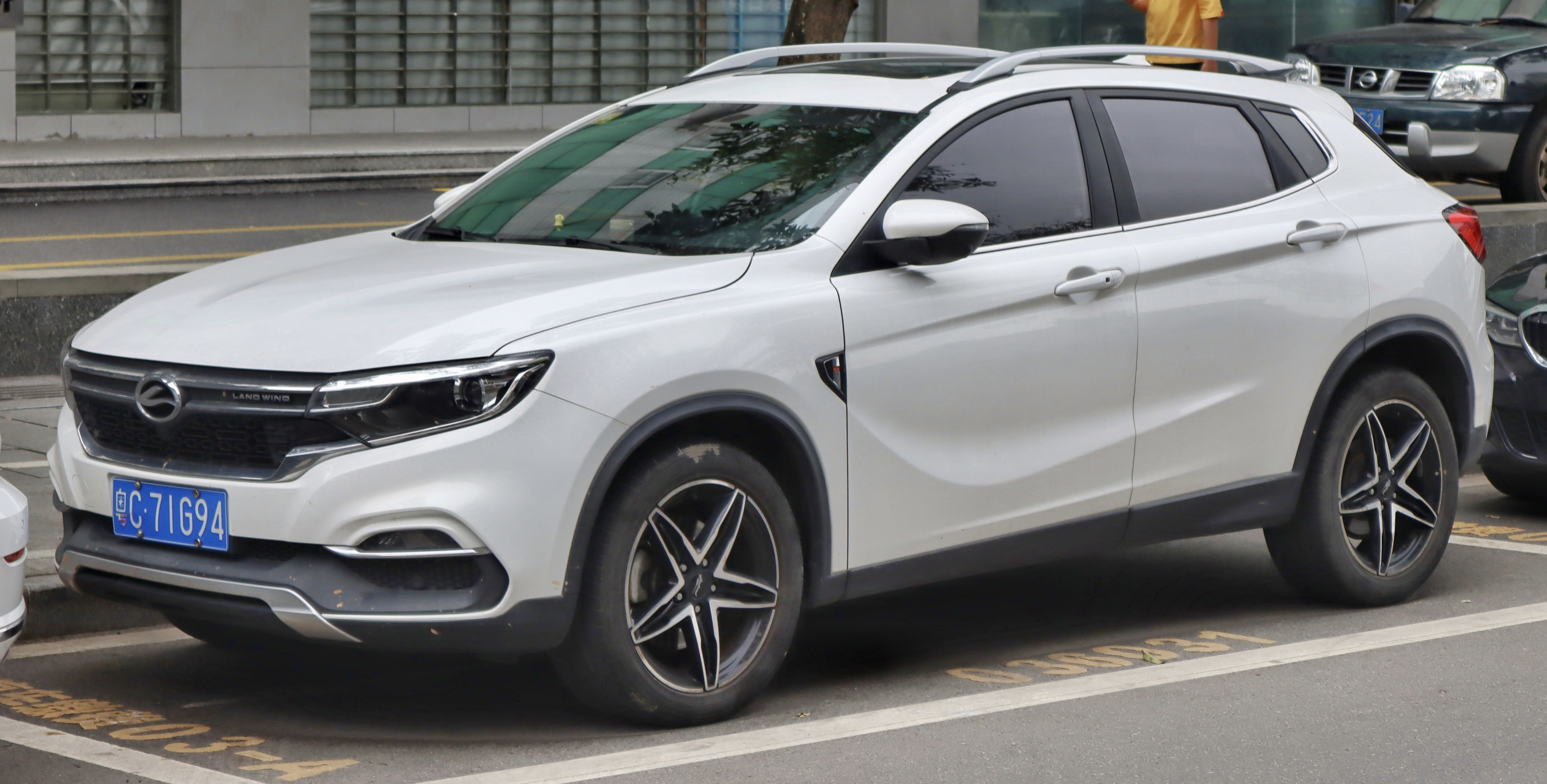
Landwind Xiaoyao

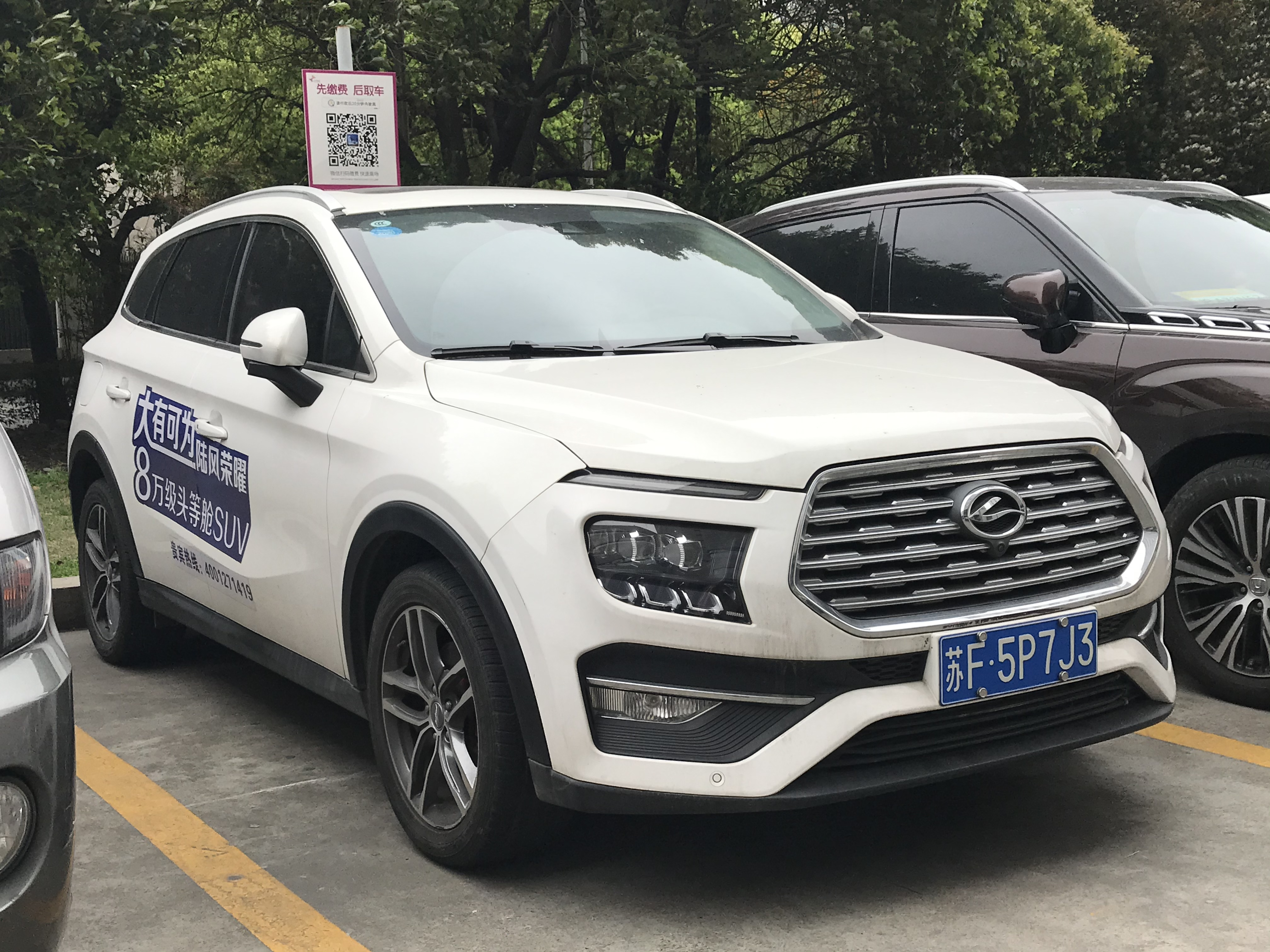
Landwind Rongyao

== Sales ==
Calendar year	Sales (China only)
2005	7,954
2006	10,162
2007	9,899
2008	5,120
2009	4,556
2010	15,151
2011	14,017
2012	12,501
2013	21,271
2014	34,002
2015	43,099
2016	80,002
