= Jiangling Holdings =

Chinese automotive company

Jiangling Motor Holding Co., Ltd.
- Type: Joint venture
- Industry: Automotive
- Founded: June 2019 (present JMH)
- Headquarters: Nanchang, Jiangxi, China
- Area served: Worldwide
- Owners: Changan (50%); JMCG (50%)

Chinese name
- Simplified Chinese: 江西江铃控股有限公司
- Traditional Chinese: 江西江鈴控股有限公司
Transcriptions
Standard Mandarin
- Hanyu Pinyin: Jiāngxī Jiānglíng Kònggǔ Yǒuxiàn Gōngsī
- Website: http://www.landwind.com/

Jiangling Holdings, also translated as Jiangling Motor Holding (JMH), is the name of two successive Jiangxi-based Chinese joint ventures focused on the automotive industry. The present Jiangling Holdings, established in June 2019 as a successor of the first one, is owned by JMCG and Changan Auto.

Since Jiangling Holdings discontinued its own brands, Landwind and Aiways, its main business currently is contract vehicle assembly for Changan Auto.

== History ==
=== Old JMH (2005 to 2019) ===
The first Jiangling Motor Holding joint venture was established in October 2004 (incorporated in November) as an equally-owned one by the state-owned enterprises Changan and JMCG. To create Jiangling Motor Holding, Changan invested money and in exchange JMCG transferred its Jiangling Motors (JMC) equity to the venture. Jiangling Motor Holding was from then on the largest shareholder of JMC, with a 41.03% stake as of March 2018. JMH also owned the Landwind marque.

Between 2005 and 2019, JMH's Landwind was the subject of complaints and legal demands by Jaguar Land Rover, with the latter alleging various illegal copies of its properties.

=== New JMH (2019 to 2026) ===
In April 2019, it was announced that JMCG and Changan planned to split JMH into two separate companies: one keeping the same name and other tentatively called Jiangling Investment. Jiangling Investment would hold the 41.03% JMC stake and some liabilities and would still be equally owned by Changan and JMCG. The new JMH would own the rest of the former JMH assets (including Landwind) and it would issue 100% more shares to be sold to investors, leaving JMCG and Changan with a 25% stake each. Jiangling Investment was formally established in May 2019, completing the split of the former JMH. In June 2019, it was announced that the investor for the new JMH was the car manufacturer Aiways. Aiways acquired a 50% of the new JMH with the aim of securing production permits for new energy vehicles. The official signing ceremony for the new JMH was in August, but production of Aiways U5s at the JMH plant started in June, as soon as the deal was completed. In June 2021, Aiways sold its new JMH stake to Jiangxi Guokong Automotive Investment Corporation, a company controlled by Nanchang's municipality, while keeping the production permits.

In 2022, after being close to bankruptcy, the new JMH was reorganised as an assembler of the Changan Raeton CC/Plus.

=== Co-owned by Changan and JMCG (2026 to present) ===
In May 2026, Jiangxi Guokong (the government of Jiangxi), the controlling shareholder of Jiangling Holdings, has signed agreements with Changan Automobile and Jiangling Group. Jiangxi Guokong will transfer 25% of the equity to Changan, and transfer another 25% of the equity Jiangling Group free of charge.

Prior to the transaction, the provincial government of Jiangxi, Changan and Jiangling Group held 50%, 25%, and 25% of the equity in Jiangling Holdings respectively, with the three parties jointly controlling Jiangling Holdings. Following the transaction, Changan and Jiangling Group will each hold 50% of the equity in Jiangling Holdings.

== Operations ==
=== Manufacturing ===
Since Jiangling Holdings discontinued its own brands, Landwind and Aiways, its main business currently is contract vehicle assembly for Changan Auto, producing the Changan Raeton CC/Plus, Changan Nevo A07, and Changan UNI-Z.

=== Former brand ===
==== Landwind ====
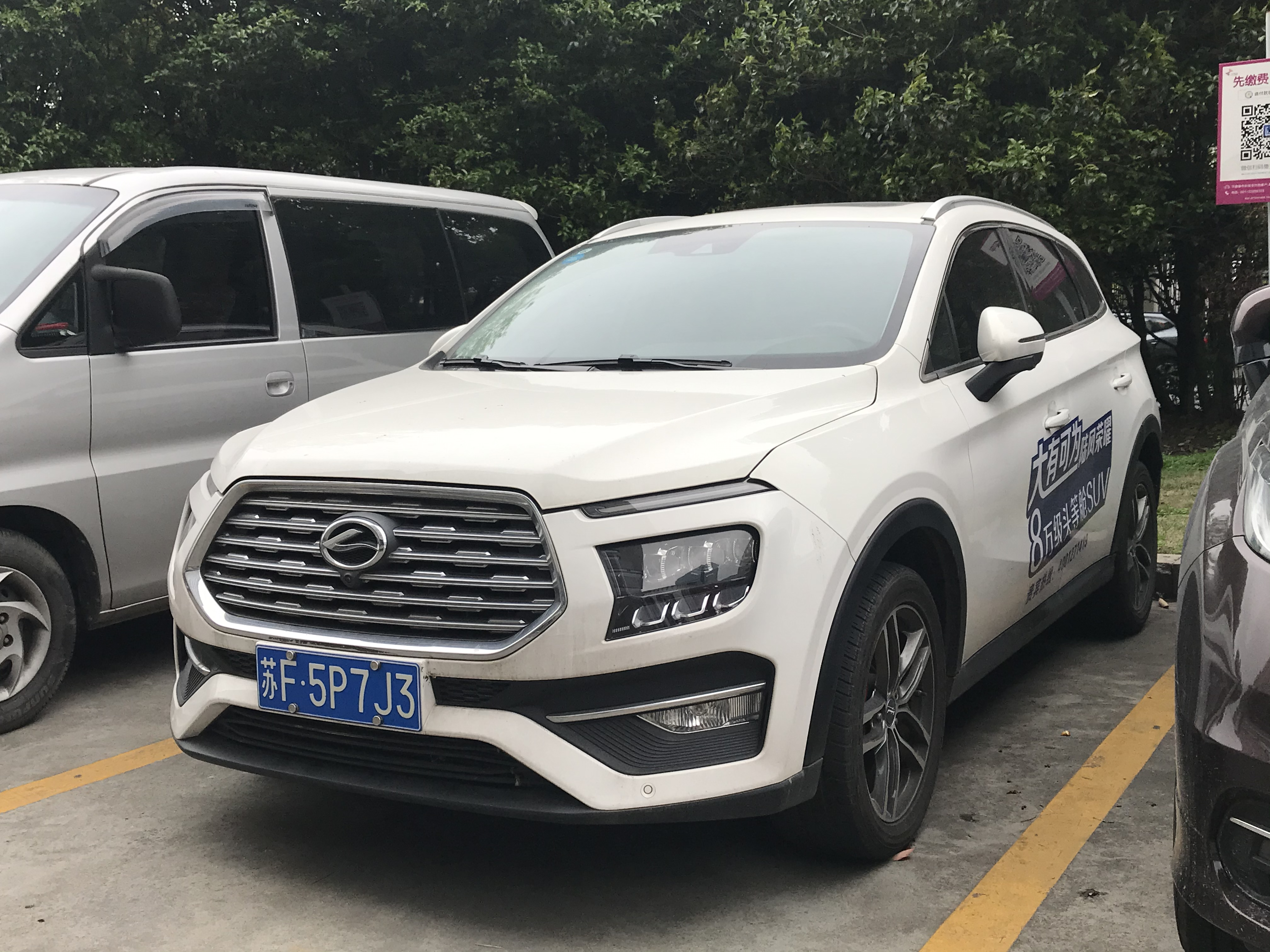
Landwind Rongyao

JMH is headquartered in Nanchang, China. The company owns the Landwind marque and produced all its models from 2004 onwards. It has also produced vehicles for its former largest shareholder, Aiways. As of 2022, it only produces vehicles on consignment for Changan.

Its Nanchang plant has the capacity to assemble up to 150,000 vehicles per year.

==== Aiways ====
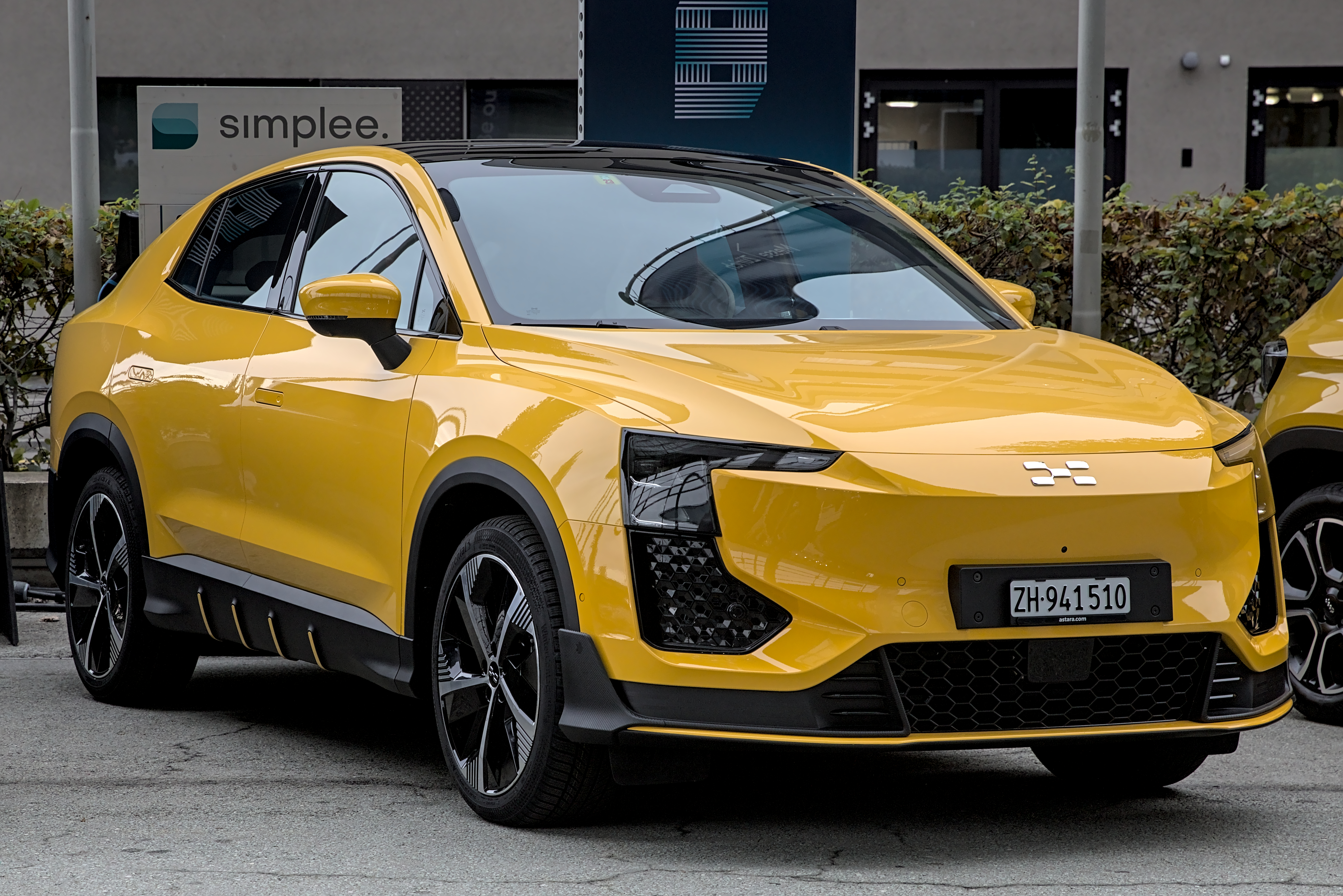
Aiways U6

In June 2019, Aiways acquired a 50% of the new JMH with the aim of securing production permits for new energy vehicles. In June 2021, Aiways sold its new JMH stake to Jiangxi Guokong, while keeping the production permits.
