= Changan UNI-Z =

Compact crossover SUV

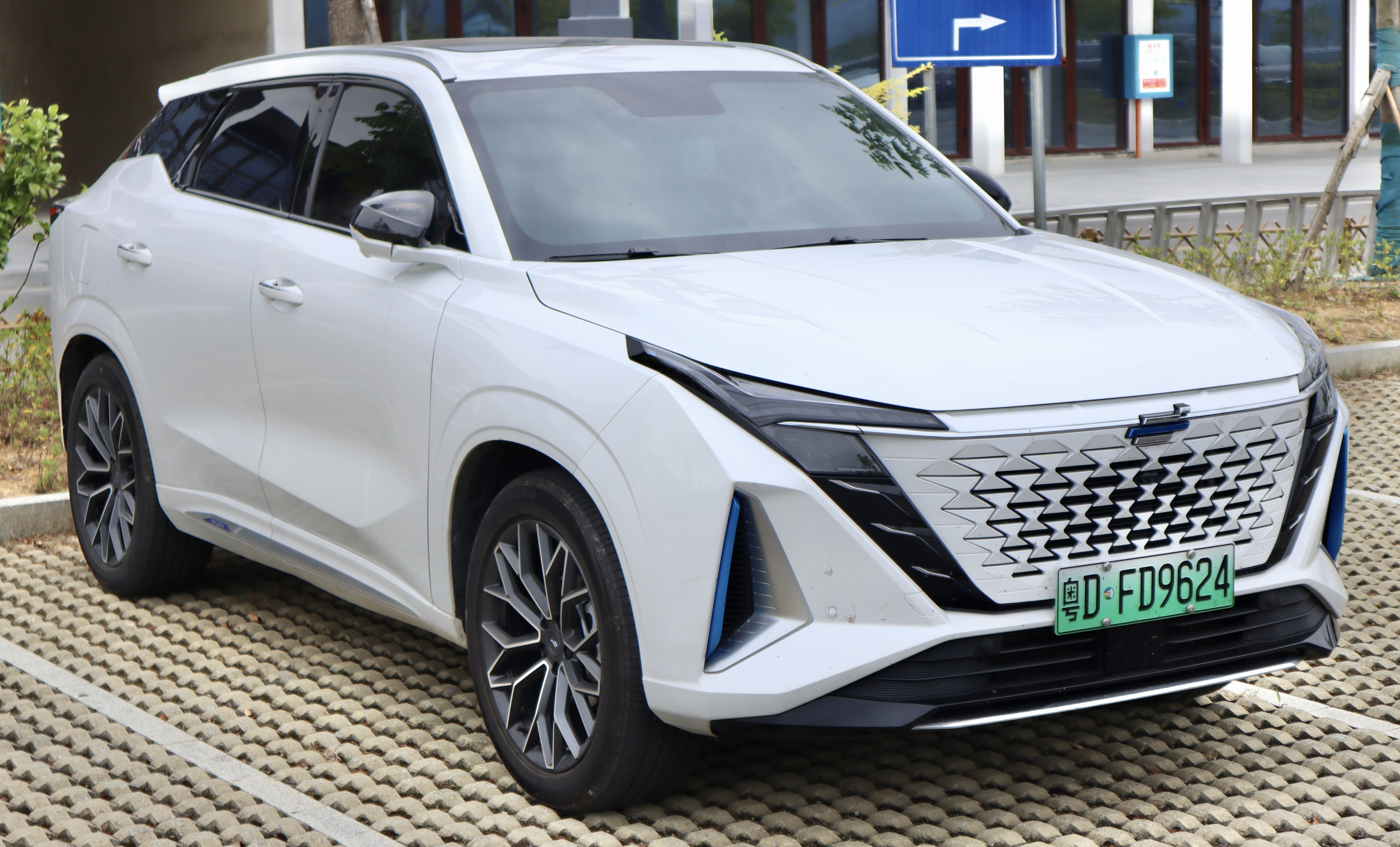

Overview
- Manufacturer: Changan Automobile
- Also called: Volga K40 (Russia)
- Production: 2022–2024 (Oshan Z6); 2024–present (Changan UNI-Z)
- Assembly: China: Chongqing; Russia: Nizhny Novgorod

Body and chassis
- Class: Compact crossover SUV (D)
- Body style: 5-door SUV
- Layout: Front-engine, front-wheel-drive

Powertrain
- Engine: 1.5 L JL473ZQ7 I4 (turbo petrol); 2.0 L I4 (turbo petrol)
- Transmission: 7 speed DCT

Dimensions
- Wheelbase: 2,795 mm (110.0 in)
- Length: 4,699 mm (185.0 in)
- Width: 1,890 mm (74.4 in)
- Height: 1,660 mm (65.4 in)
- Curb weight: 1,500–1,820 kg (3,307–4,012 lb)

The Changan UNI-Z and the original Oshan Z6 is a compact crossover SUV produced by Changan Automobile under the Oshan brand. Launched in mid-2022, Changan initially sold the Oshan Z6 only in China and UAE.

== Overview ==
The Oshan Z6 debuted in March 2022 and went on sale in the Chinese market in mid-2022. The Oshan Z6 was branded under Oshan, with the stated goal of being a more accessible premium brand that focuses on building passenger vehicles.

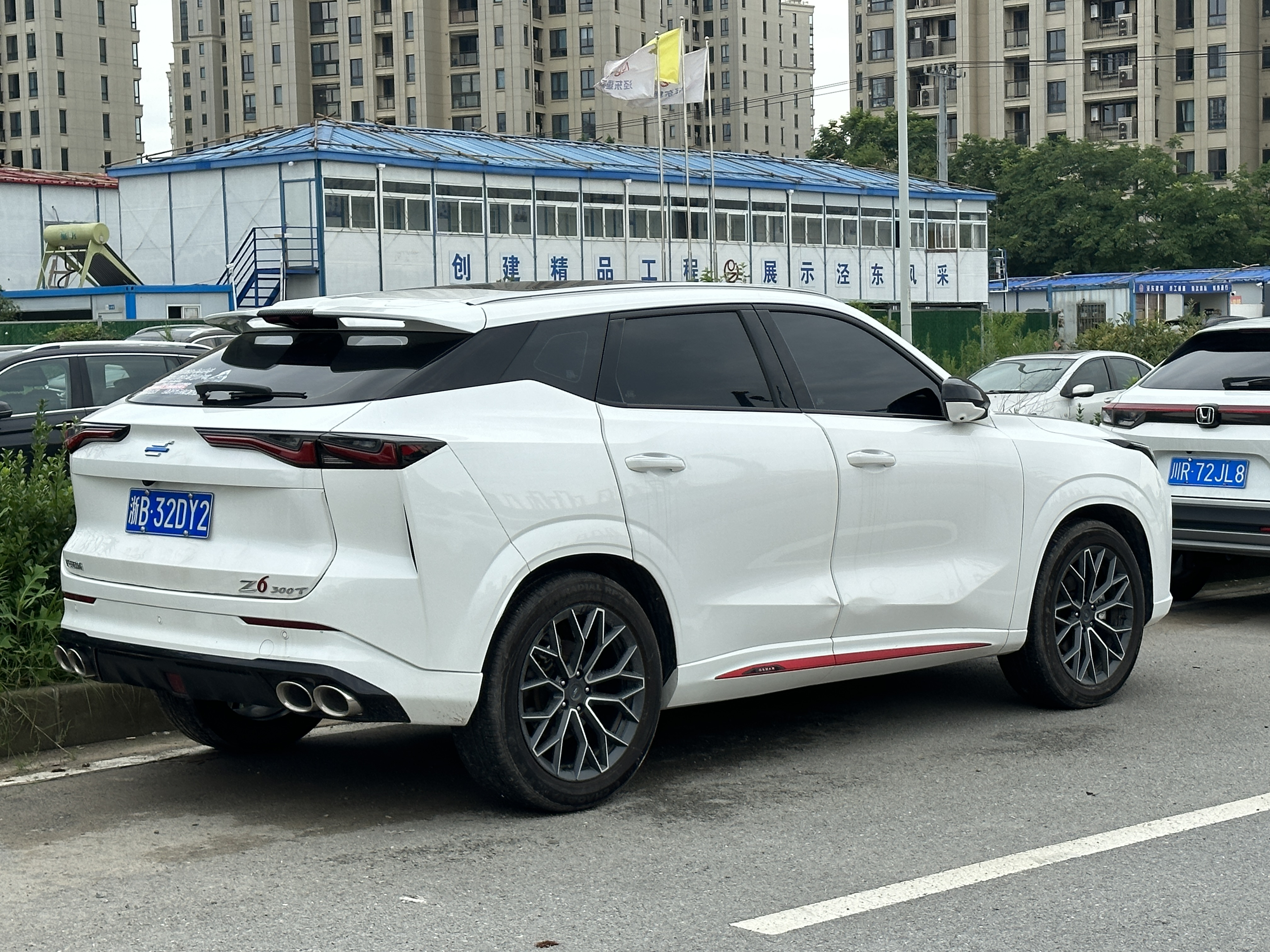
Rear view

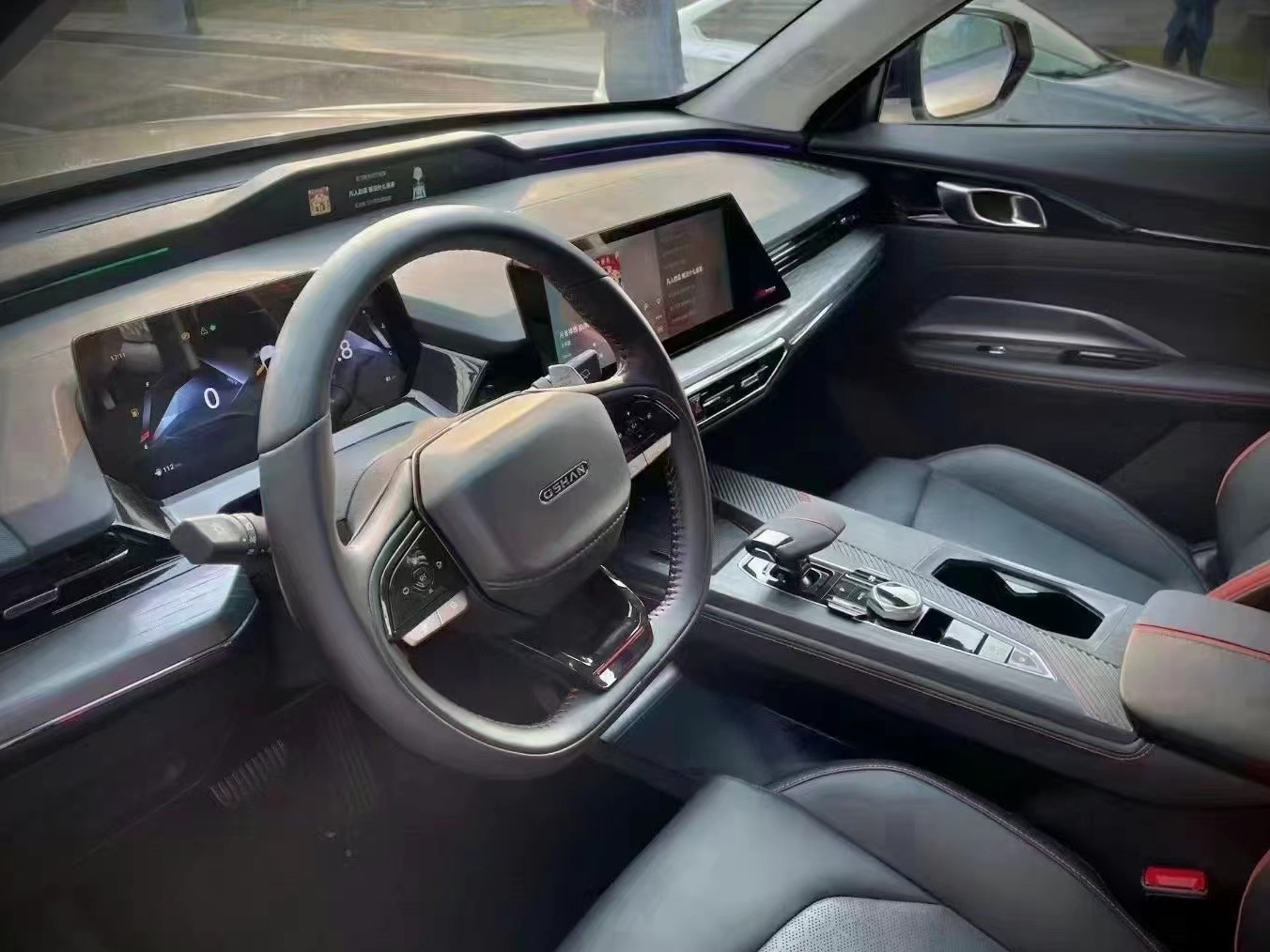
Interior

=== Interior and technology ===
The interior of the Oshan Z6 has three screens. The first is a 10.25 inch instrument panel, the second is a 12.3 inch central touch screen with an uneven shape and the third screen is 9.1 inches in diameter and is mainly used for navigation. The three screen setup is standard across the range, but for higher trim levels, AR-HUD is added. The infotainment system is paired with the On Style 5.0 system with microphone-free karaoke and voice recognition, allowing drivers to link their voices to different adjustments. The Oshan Z6 also has the Eagle Pilot 7.0 driver-assistance system with 12 radars, 3 millimeter-wave radars, and 5 cameras. The system allows the vehicle to park itself and assist the driver on road.

== Powertrain ==
The Oshan Z6 is available as a petrol and or PHEV. A base version of the Z6 is powered by a 1.5-litre turbocharged petrol engine developing 188 hp (140 kW; 191 PS) and 300 N⋅m (221 lb⋅ft; 31 kg⋅m) of torque. The higher trim level is equipped with a 2.0-litre turbocharged petrol engine delivering 233 hp (174 kW; 236 PS) and 390 N⋅m (288 lb⋅ft; 40 kg⋅m) of torque. The PHEV version is equipped with a 1.5-litre engine with an 85-kilowatt (114 hp; 116 PS) electric motor that produces a combined total of 282 hp (210 kW; 286 PS) and 585 N⋅m (431 lb⋅ft; 60 kg⋅m) of torque. All powertrains are mated to a 7-speed dual-clutch transmission.

== Changan UNI-Z ==
As of March 2024, the Changan UNI-Z plug-in hybrid was announced. Being essentially a rebadged and facelifted Oshan Z6, the Changan UNI-Z will replace the Oshan Z6 and be sold under the Changan UNI series.

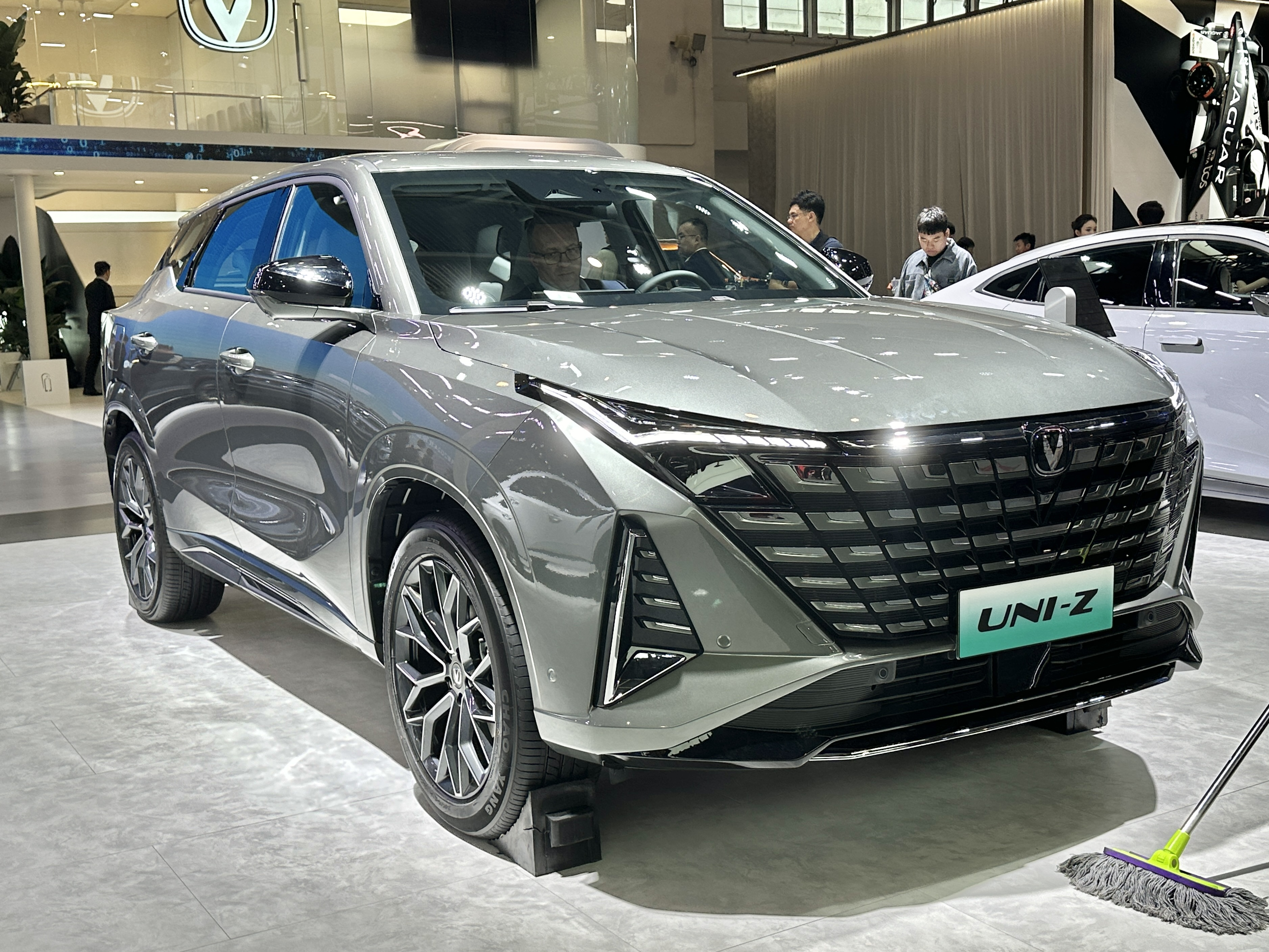
Changan UNI-Z

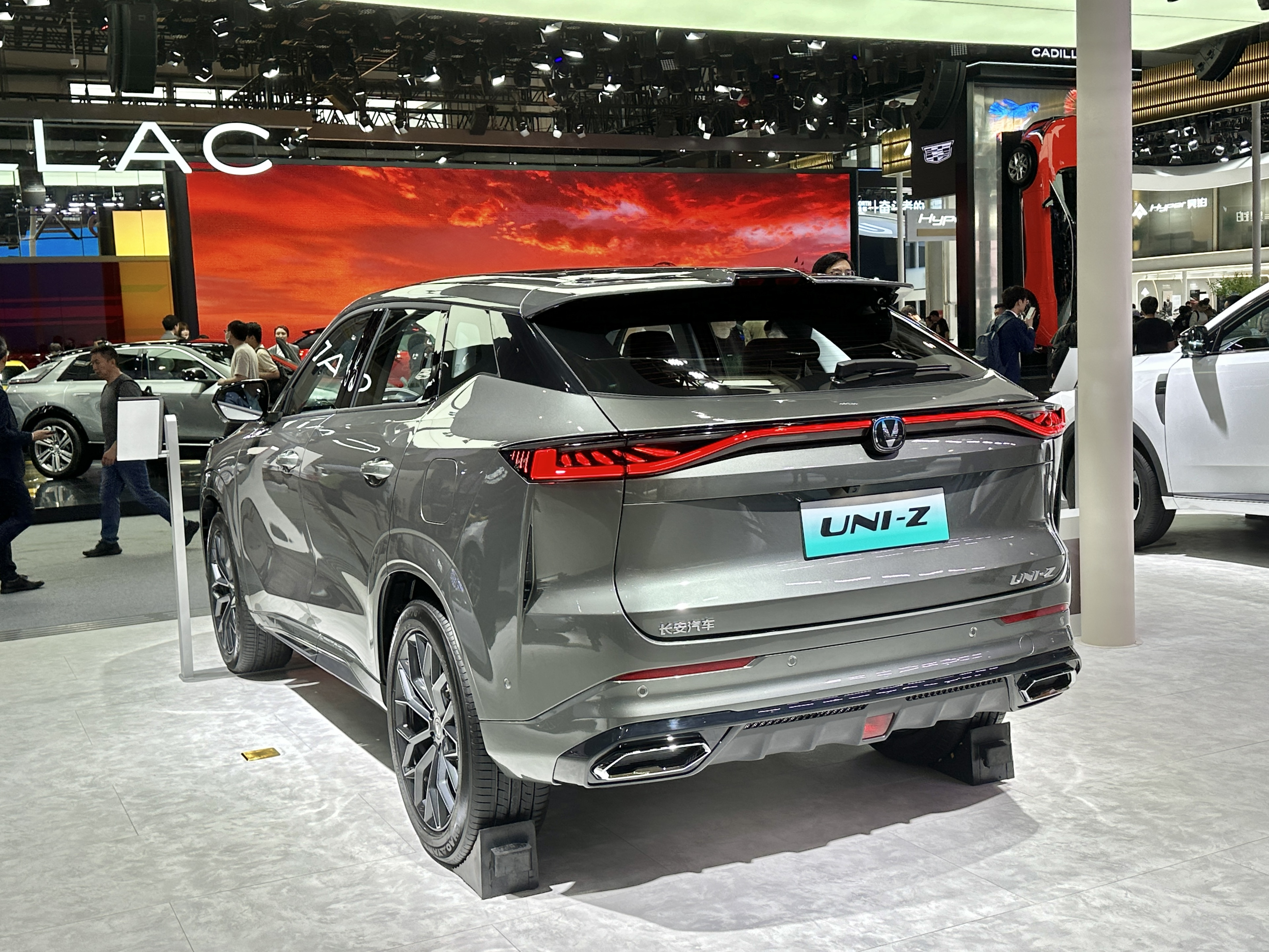
Rear view

== Sales ==
Year	China				Total production				
Year	Oshan Z6	PHEV	UNI-Z	PHEV	Oshan Z6	PHEV	UNI-Z	PHEV	Total
2023	85,649	23,833	—	—	80,937	40,700	—	—	
2024	41,802	16,597	15,582	46,155	35,490	8,984	16,137	67,339	109,624
2025	3,356	1,362	27,325	29,112	523	5	—	62,524	
