= Landwind Xiaoyao =

Chinese compact crossover SUV

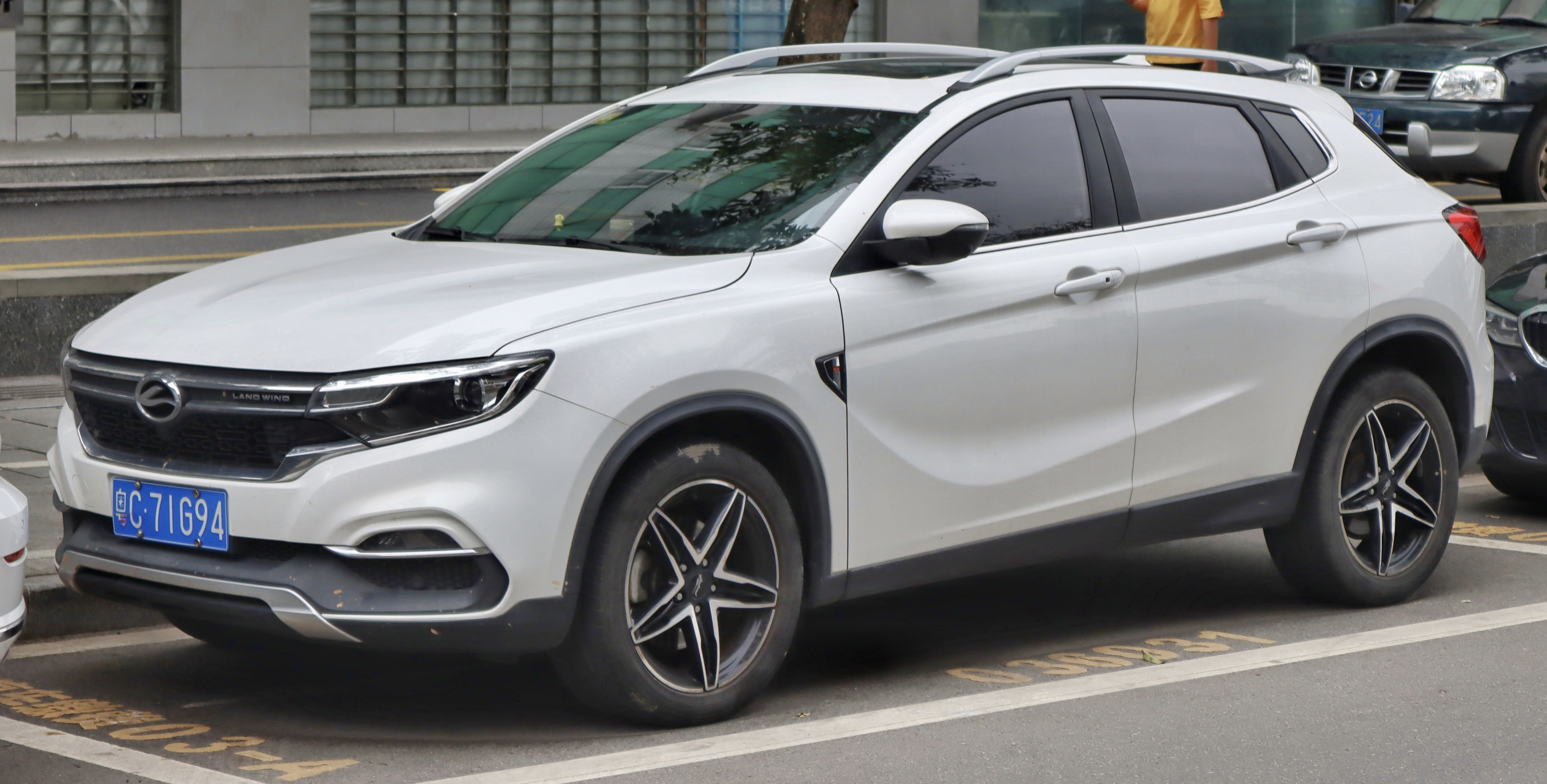
- Landwind Xiaoyao

Overview
- Manufacturer: Landwind
- Also called: Landwind E33
- Production: 2017–2021
- Model years: 2018–2021

Body and chassis
- Class: Compact crossover SUV
- Body style: 5-door SUV

Powertrain
- Engine: 1.5 L turbo I4
- Transmission: 5-speed automatic

Dimensions
- Wheelbase: 2,700 mm (110 in)
- Length: 4,439 mm (174.8 in)
- Width: 1,835 mm (72.2 in)
- Height: 1,560 mm (61 in)

The Landwind Xiaoyao (逍遙) is a compact crossover SUV produced by Chinese car manufacturer Landwind.

== Overview ==
The Landwind Xiaoyao was previewed by the Landwind Xiaoyao concept during the 2016 Guangzhou Auto Show, and the production version debuted on the 2017 Chengdu Auto Show and was launched on the Chinese car market in Q2 2017. The Landwind Xiaoyao compact CUV was positioned right between the Landwind X2 subcompact CUV and the Landwind X7 compact CUV with prices of the Xiaoyao ranging from 76,900 yuan and ends at 121,700 yuan.

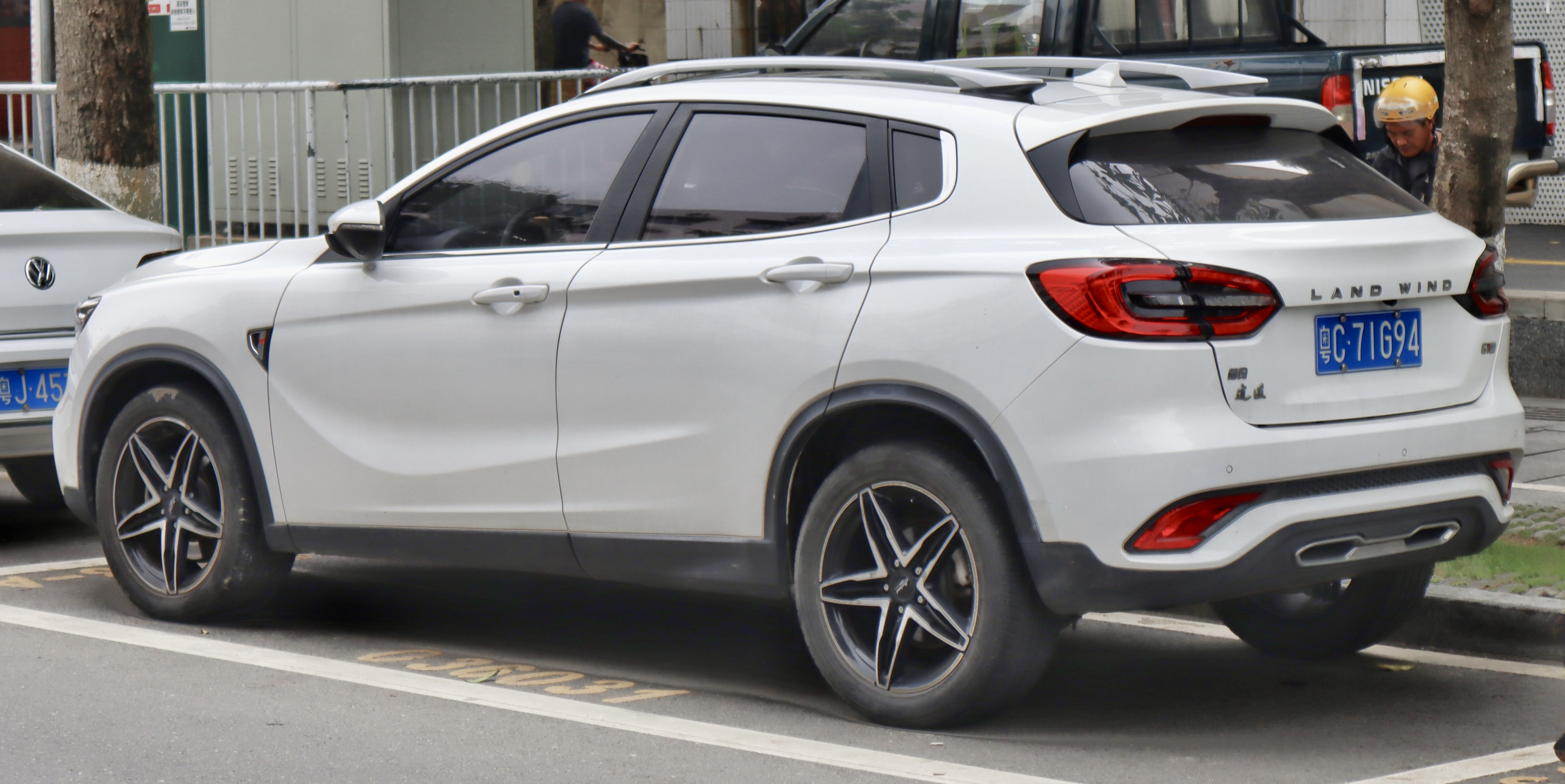
Landwind Xiaoyao rear
