= Changan CS75 =

Chinese compact crossover SUV manufactured by Changan

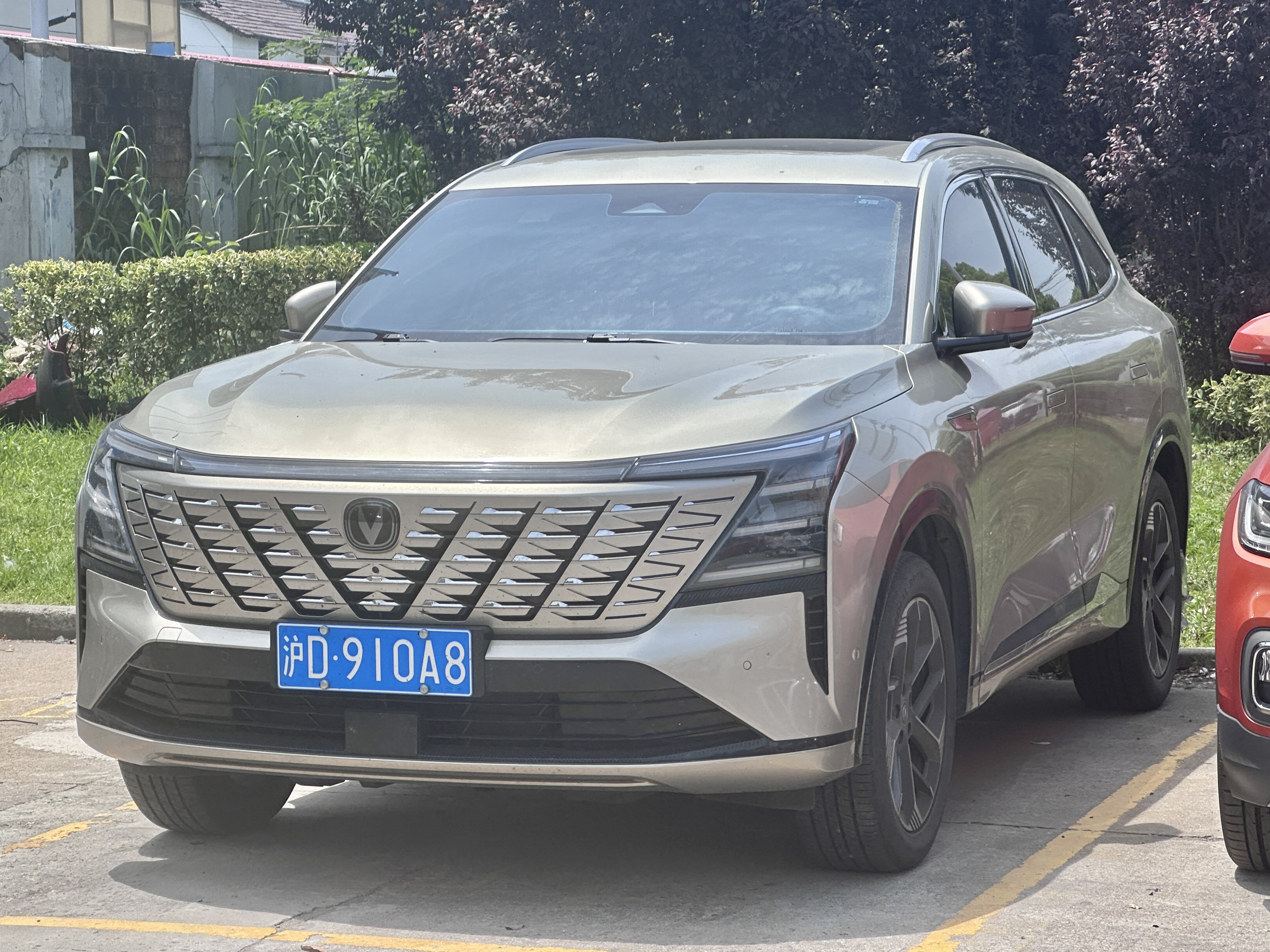

Overview
- Manufacturer: Changan Automobile
- Production: 2013–present

Body and chassis
- Class: Compact crossover SUV (C)
- Body style: 5-door SUV
- Layout: Front-engine, front-wheel-drive

The Changan CS75 or CS75 Plus is a compact crossover SUV produced by Changan Automobile. Debuted during the 2013 Guangzhou Auto Show and launched on the Chinese auto market in 2014.

The first generation of Changan CS75 received a facelift in 2018 and an additional PHEV model in the same year. As of November 2020, the "Millionth Edition" first generation CS75 based on the 2018 facelift model was announced.

The second generation debuted on the 2019 Shanghai Auto Show which marketed as Changan CS75 Plus. It was launched on the Chinese auto market in 2019 while the original CS75 model remains in production and on the market. It received a facelift which marketed as "second generation CS75 Plus" in 2022 with updated powertrain and revised design. It was facelifted in 2023 which marketed as "third generation CS75 Plus"

The third generation was unveiled in July 2024, which was marketed as "the fourth generation CS75 Plus" Codenamed C928, the third generation CS75 Plus was launched in September of 2024.

== First generation (CS75, 2013) ==
Changan CS75
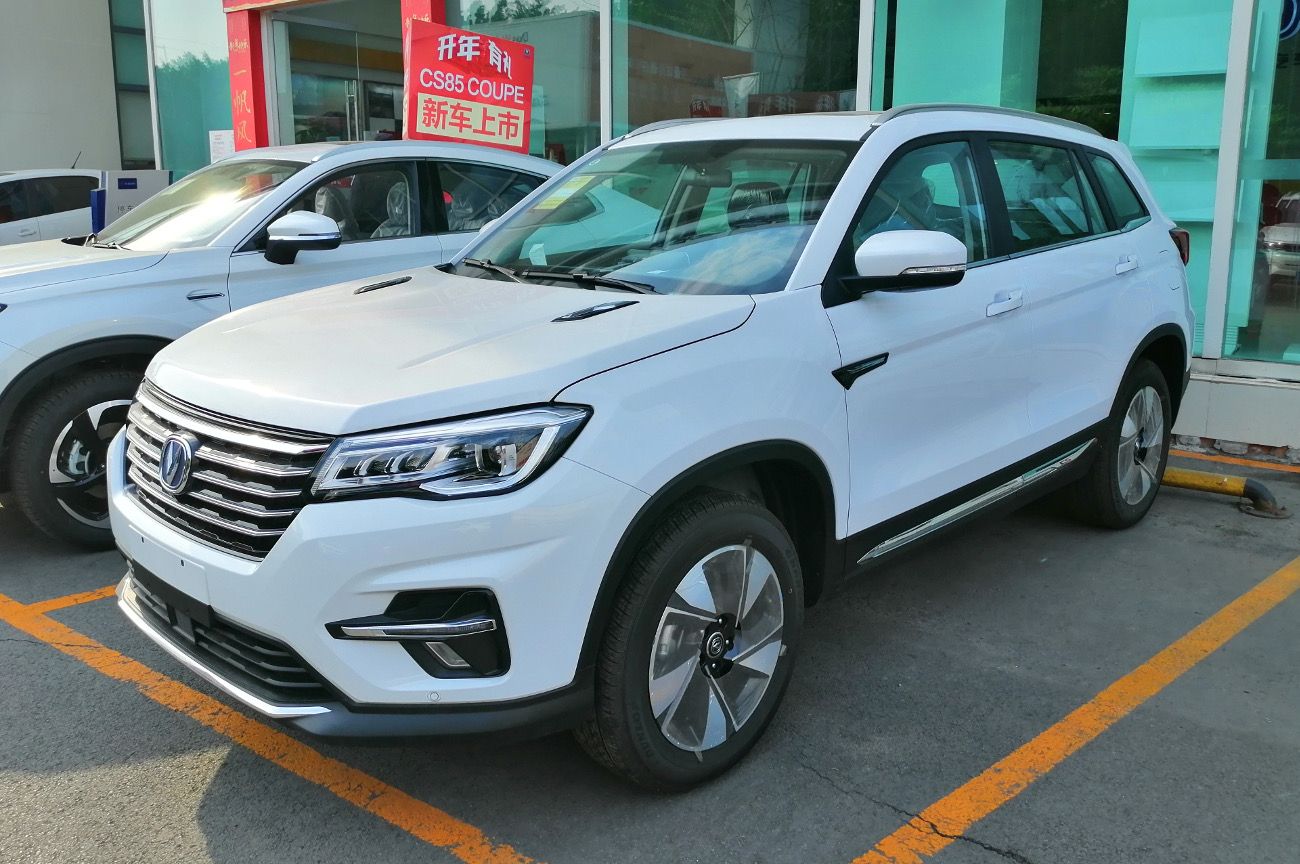
- Changan CS75 facelift

Overview
- Manufacturer: Changan Automobile
- Production: 2013–2024
- Model years: 2014–2024
- Assembly: China: Beijing

Body and chassis
- Body style: 5-door SUV
- Layout: Front-engine, front-wheel-drive Front-engine, four-wheel-drive

Powertrain
- Engine: Petrol: 1.5 L JL476ZQCA I4 turbo; 1.8 L JL486ZQ2 I4 turbo; 2.0 L JL486Q5 I4
- Transmission: 6-speed manual 6-speed automatic

Dimensions
- Wheelbase: 2,700 mm (106.3 in)
- Length: 4,650 mm (183.1 in)
- Width: 1,850 mm (72.8 in)
- Height: 1,705 mm (67.1 in)

The Changan CS75 debuted on the 2013 Guangzhou Auto Show and was launched on the Chinese auto market in 2014. Pricing for the CS75 ranges from 108,800 yuan to 143,800 yuan slotting above the compact Changan CS55 and the mid-size Changan CS95.

Two engines are available for the CS75, a 1.8-litre turbo engine with 180 horsepower (134 kW; 182 PS) and 230 N⋅m (170 lb⋅ft; 23 kg⋅m), and a 2.0-litre engine with 158 horsepower (118 kW; 160 PS). Both engines are mated to a 6-speed manual transmission or a 6-speed automatic transmission.

The CS75 will also be available in Europe as well, as an important part of Changan’s product line in Europe that will also include the Changan Eado sedan and CS35 subcompact crossover.

Pricing of the CS75 in Europe will start around 20,000 Euro.

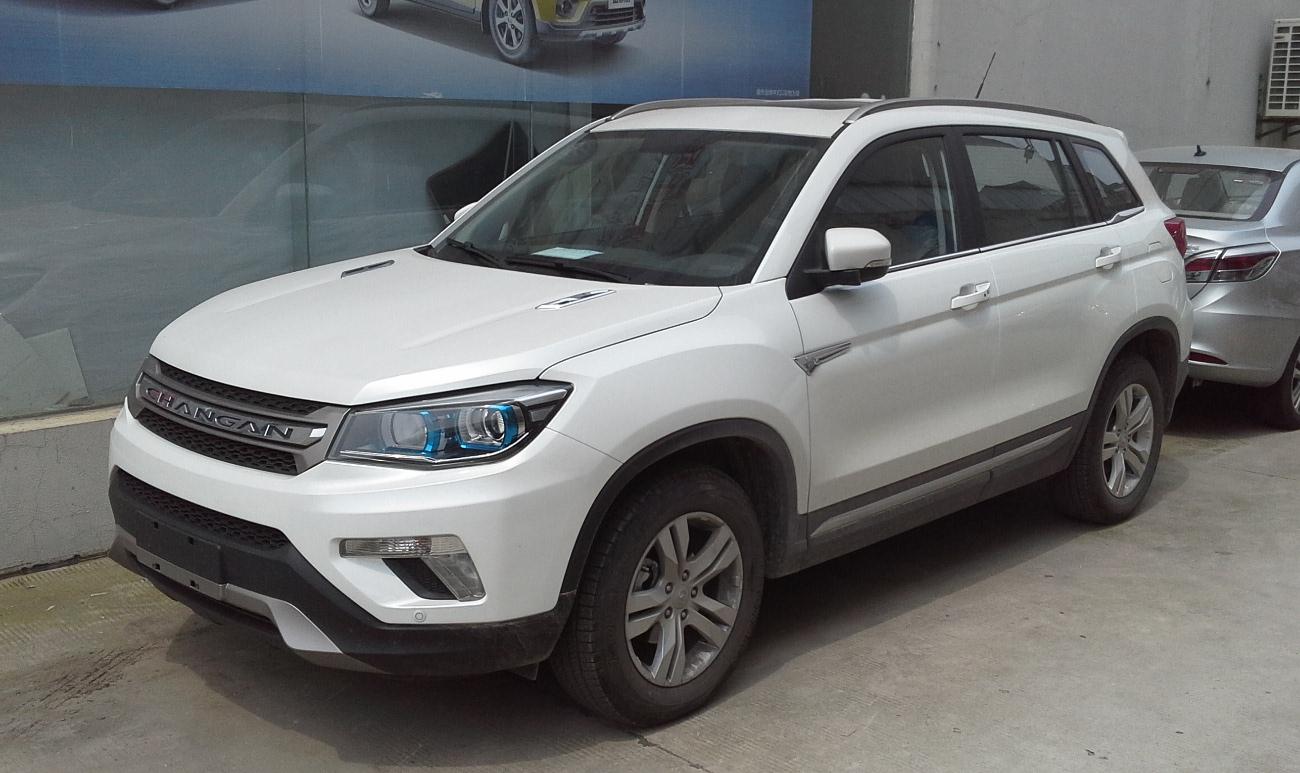
Pre-facelift Changan CS75

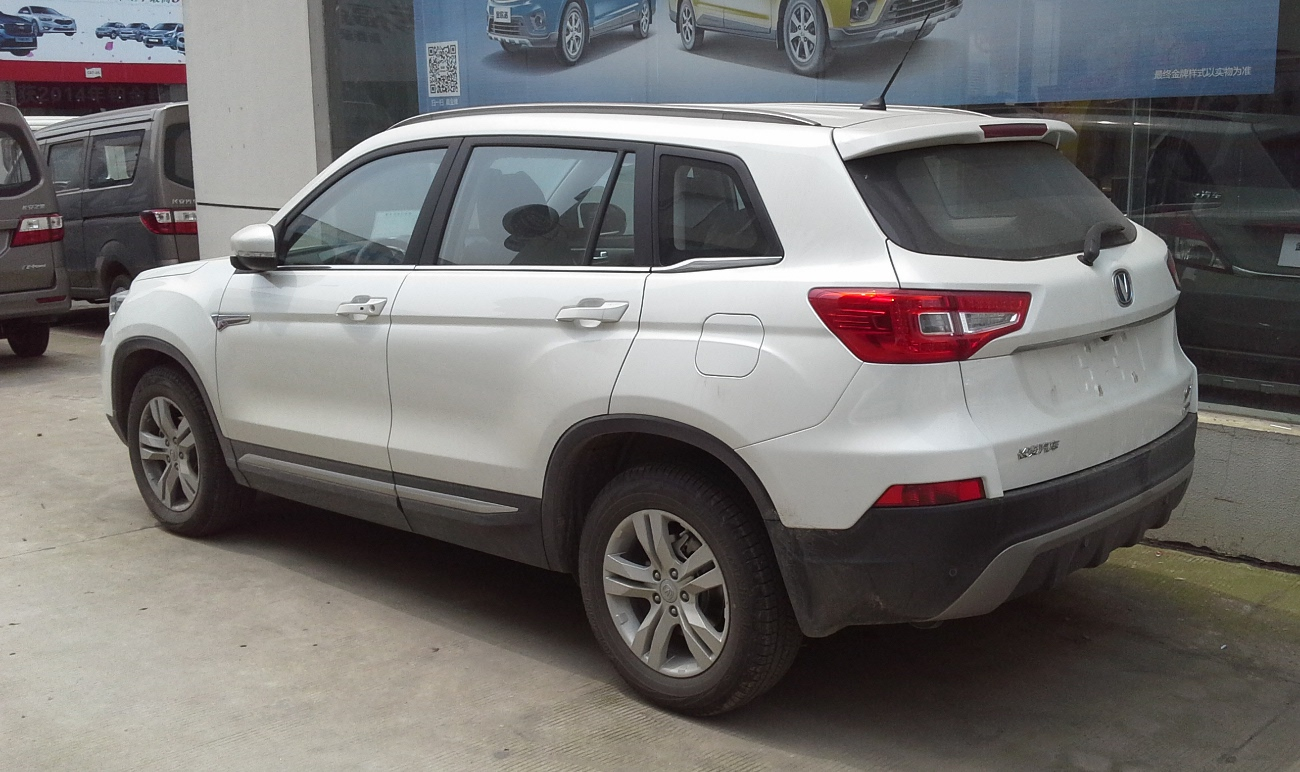
Pre-facelift Changan CS75 (rear)

=== 2018 facelift ===
A facelift was revealed during the 2018 Beijing Auto Show updating the front bumper, front grilles, and connected tail lamps. The 2018 facelift was also sold as "Millionth Edition" first generation CS75 and is powered by a 1.5-litre turbo engine with 178 horsepower (133 kW; 180 PS) and 265 N⋅m (195 lb⋅ft; 27 kg⋅m) and mated to a 6-speed manual transmission or a 7-speed DCT.

=== CS75 PHEV ===
A plug-in hybrid version was also available based on the post-facelift CS75, with deliveries for the Changan CS75 PHEV starting in September 2018. The Changan CS75 PHEV is equipped with a 136-kilogram (300 lb), 13 kWh (47 MJ) battery delivering a range of 60 kilometres (37 mi) rated by NEDC and energy consumption of the CS75 PHEV is 12.96 kWh/100km based on the NEDC driving cycle. Based on the NEDC driving cycle the combined fuel consumption of the CS75 PHEV is 1.6 L/100 km (180 mpg_{‑imp}; 150 mpg_{‑US}). The fuel consumption of the combustion engine of the CS75 PHEV is 5.1 L/100 km (55 mpg_{‑imp}; 46 mpg_{‑US}).

The combined power produced by the plug-in hybrid drivetrain of the Changan CS75 PHEV is 255 kW (342 hp; 347 PS), with 154 horsepower (115 kW; 156 PS) produced by the engine. The electric powertrain of the CS75 PHEV consists of electric motors at the front and rear of the car, the front motor puts out 70 kW (94 hp; 95 PS) of power, while the rear motor produces a maximum power of 80 kW (107 hp; 109 PS), giving the CS75 PHEV a maximum combined all wheel drive power of 220 kW (295 hp; 299 PS) and 605 N⋅m (446 lb⋅ft; 62 kg⋅m) of torque. With 225 N⋅m (166 lb⋅ft; 23 kg⋅m) from the petrol engine, and 515 N⋅m (380 lb⋅ft; 53 kg⋅m) from the electric motor. The electric motor of the CS75 PHEV at the front generates 200 N⋅m (148 lb⋅ft; 20 kg⋅m) torque, while the rear electric motor producing 195 N⋅m (144 lb⋅ft; 20 kg⋅m), adding up to a maximum torque of 515 N⋅m (380 lb⋅ft; 53 kg⋅m). while in electric mode, the top speed of the 2018 CS75 PHEV is 180 km/h (110 mph). In terms of acceleration, the CS75 PHEV goes from 0 to 100 km/h (0 to 62 mph) in 8.6 seconds.

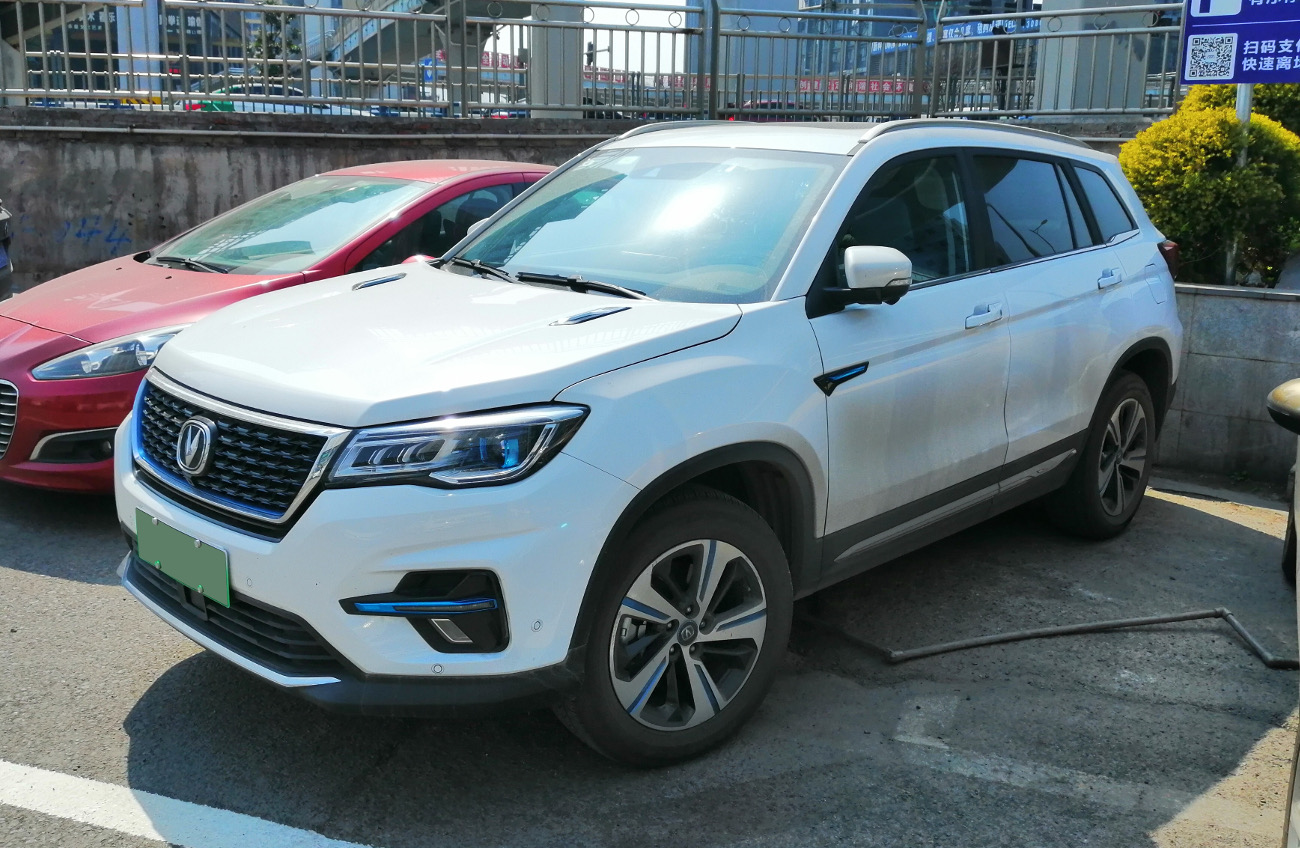
Changan CS75 PHEV

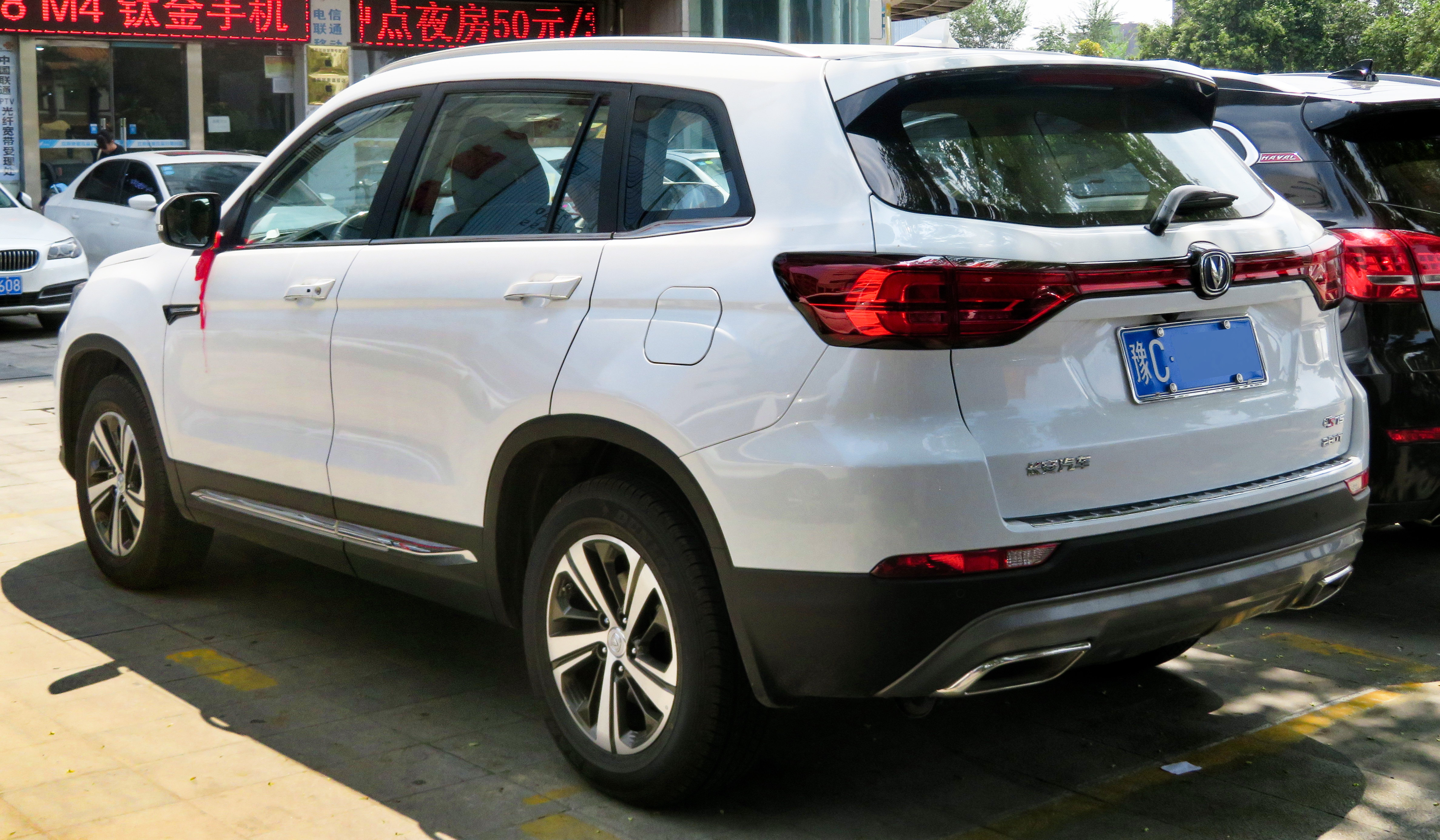
Changan CS75 facelift rear

=== CS75 Blue Whale Edition ===
In October 2022, the original CS75 received an update called the CS75 Blue Whale Edition. The Blue Whale Edition is based on the 2018 facelift while featuring a redesigned front bumper. The CS75 Blue Whale Edition is equipped with the Blue Whale NE 1.5 liter turbocharged engine with a maximum power of 180 hp (134 kW; 182 PS) and a peak torque of 300 N⋅m (221 lb⋅ft; 31 kg⋅m), matched with a 6-speed manual transmission or a 7-speed wet dual-clutch gearbox.

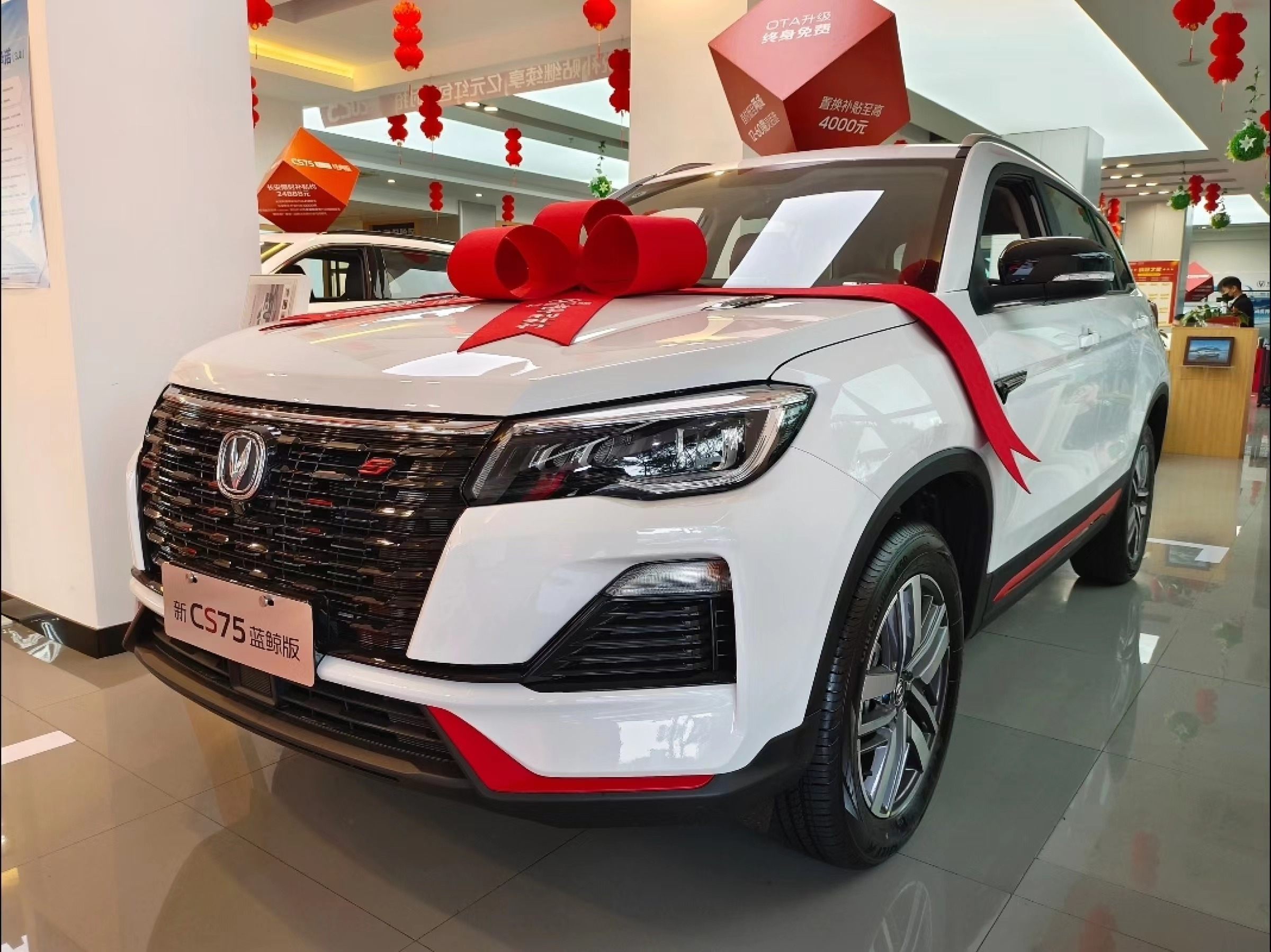
Changan CS75 Blue Whale Edition

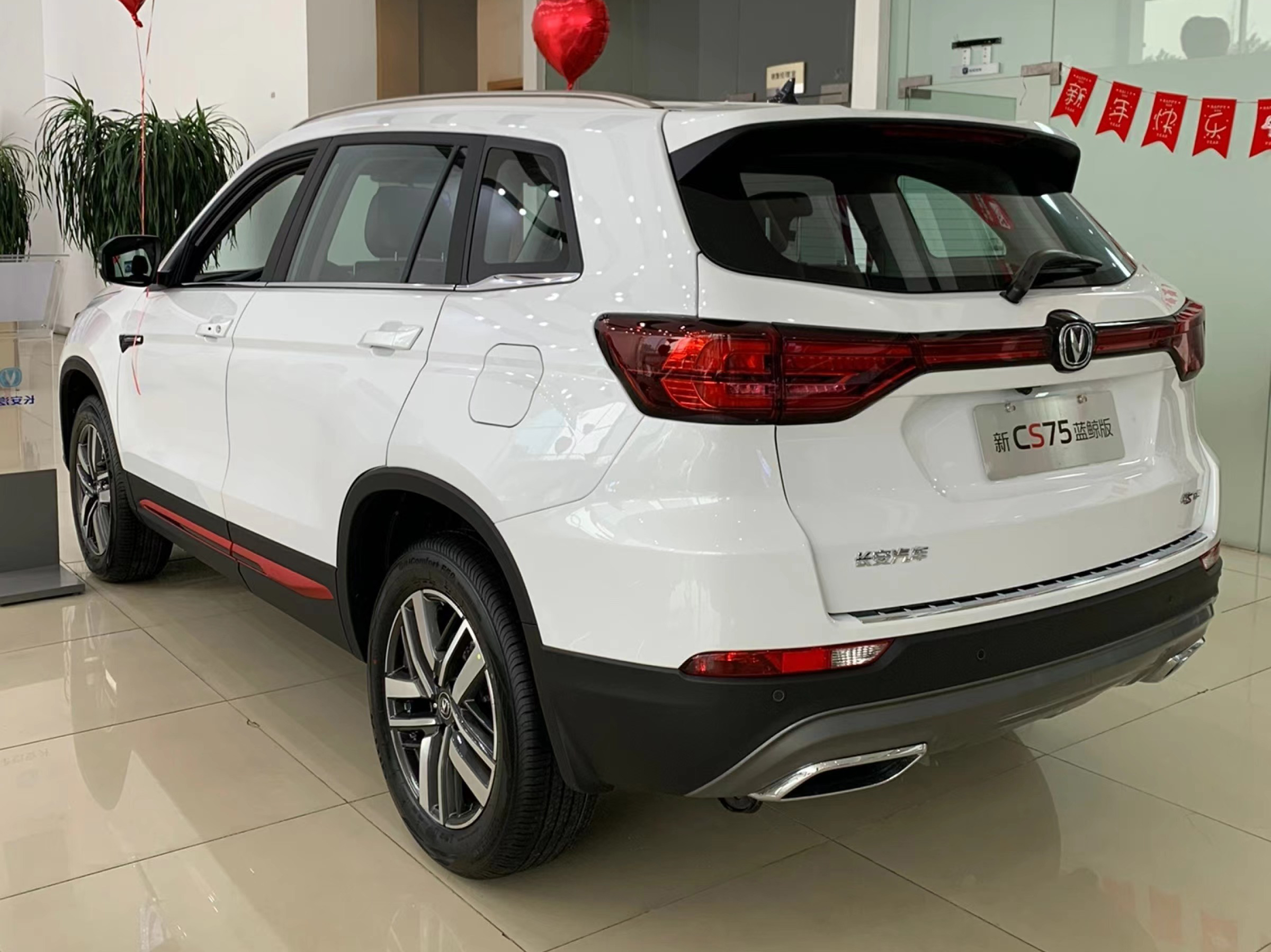
Changan CS75 Blue Whale Edition rear

=== 2024 facelift ===
The original CS75 received another facelift for the 2024 model year before being replaced by the CS75 Pro in 2025. The facelift features a restyled front bumper sporting a wider grille and more rugged appearance with revised interior details while the power train remains the same as the original gasoline powered CS75.

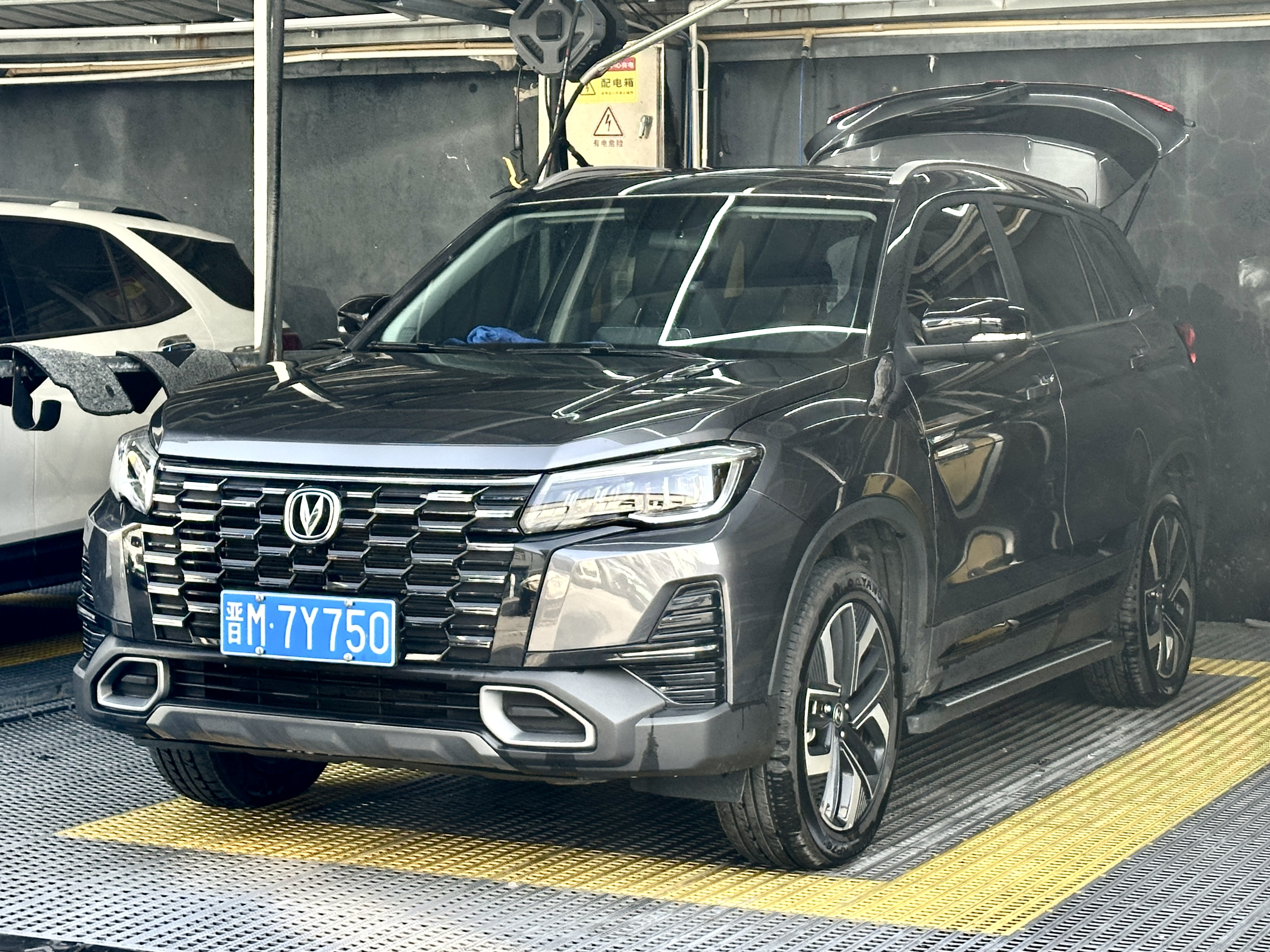
Changan CS75 2024 facelift

== Second generation (CS75 Plus Gen.1-Gen.3,2019) ==
Changan CS75 Plus (second generation)
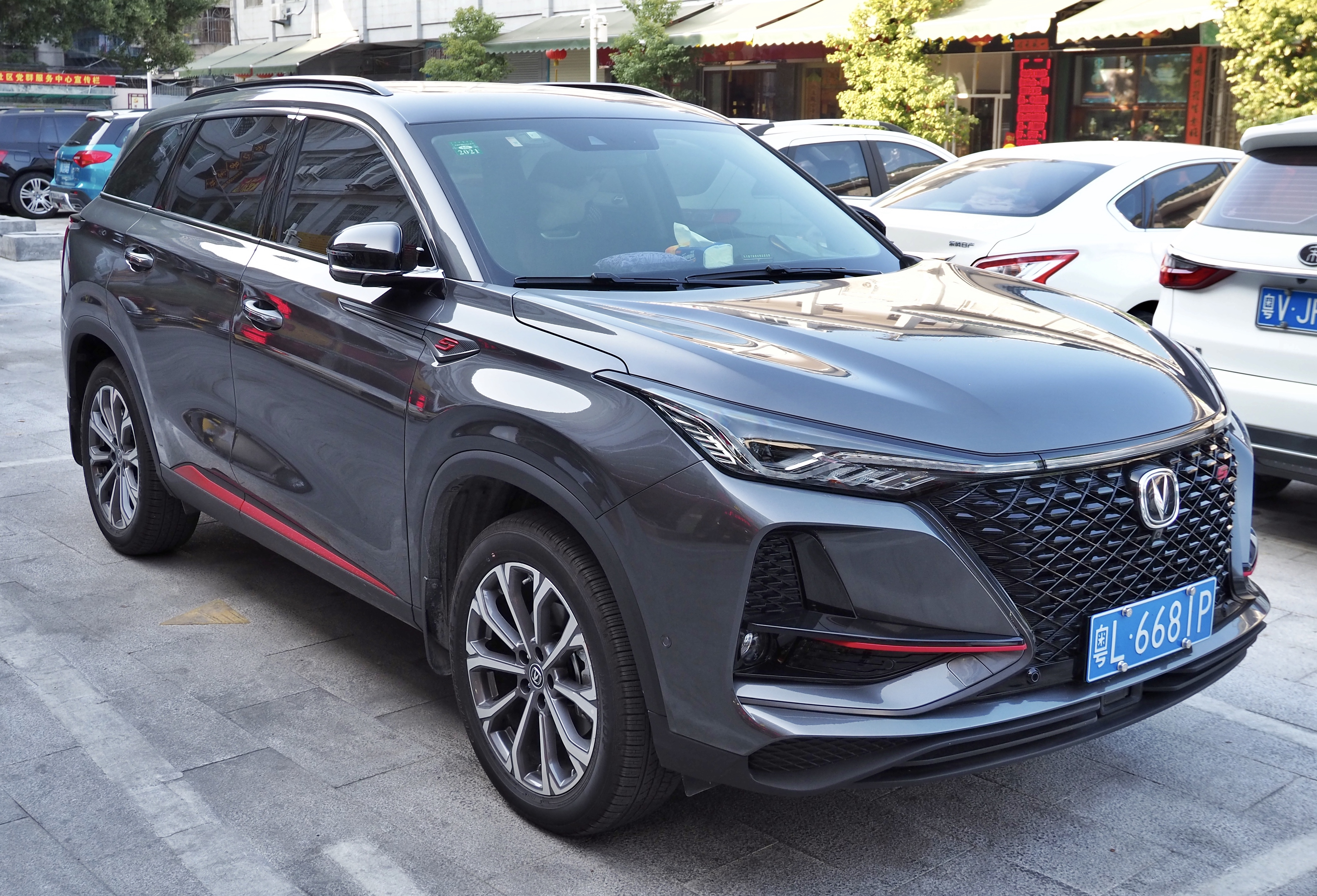
- Changan CS75 Plus

Overview
- Manufacturer: Changan Automobile
- Production: 2019–present
- Model years: 2020–present
- Assembly: China

Body and chassis
- Body style: 5-door SUV
- Layout: Front-engine, front-wheel-drive

Powertrain
- Engine: Petrol: 1.5 L JL476ZQCA/JL476ZQCA I4 turbo (Gen.1); 1.5 L JL473ZQ7 I4 (Gen.2 and 3)turbo; 2.0 L JL486ZQ4 I4 turbo (Gen.1); 2.0 L JL486ZQ5 I4 turbo (Gen.2 and 3)
- Transmission: 6-speed manual (Gen.1); 6-speed automatic(Gen.1); 8-speed automatic(Gen.2 and 3)

Dimensions
- Wheelbase: 2,710 mm (106.7 in)
- Length: 4,670 mm (183.9 in) (Gen.1) 4,700 mm (185.0 in) (Gen.2) 4,710 mm (185.4 in) (Gen.3)
- Width: 1,865 mm (73.4 in)
- Height: 1,700 mm (66.9 in)

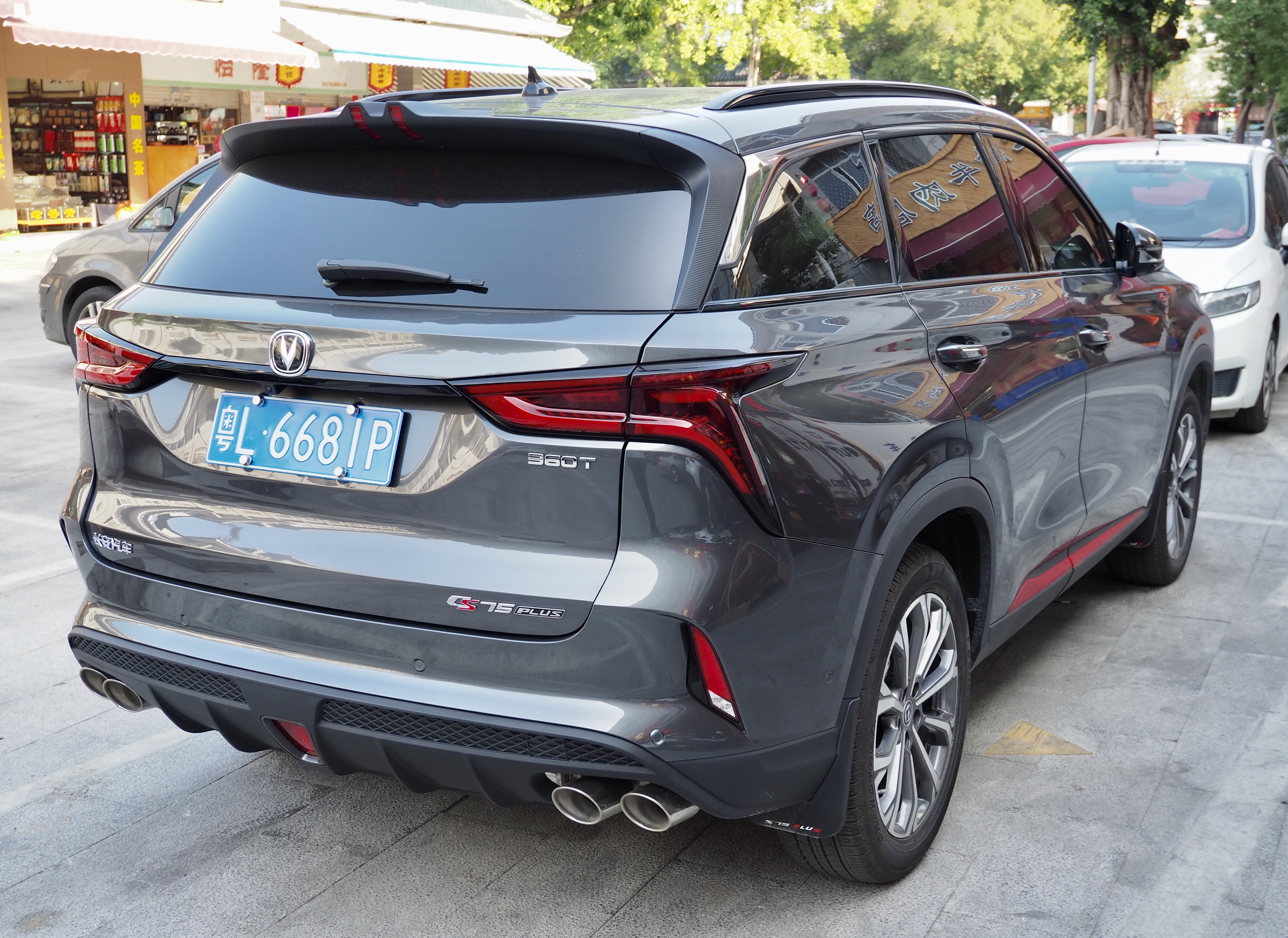
Changan CS75 Plus rear

The Changan CS75 Plus debuted on the 2019 Shanghai Auto Show and was launched on the Chinese auto market in 2019. The CS75 Plus is available with a 1.5-litre turbo engine producing 178 hp (133 kW; 180 PS) horsepower labeled 280T, and a sportier 2.0-litre turbo engine model producing 233 hp (174 kW; 236 PS) labeled 360T. The CS75 Plus was sold alongside its predecessor, with the CS75 being positioned sightly lower in the product range.

=== 2022 facelift (marketed as second generation) ===
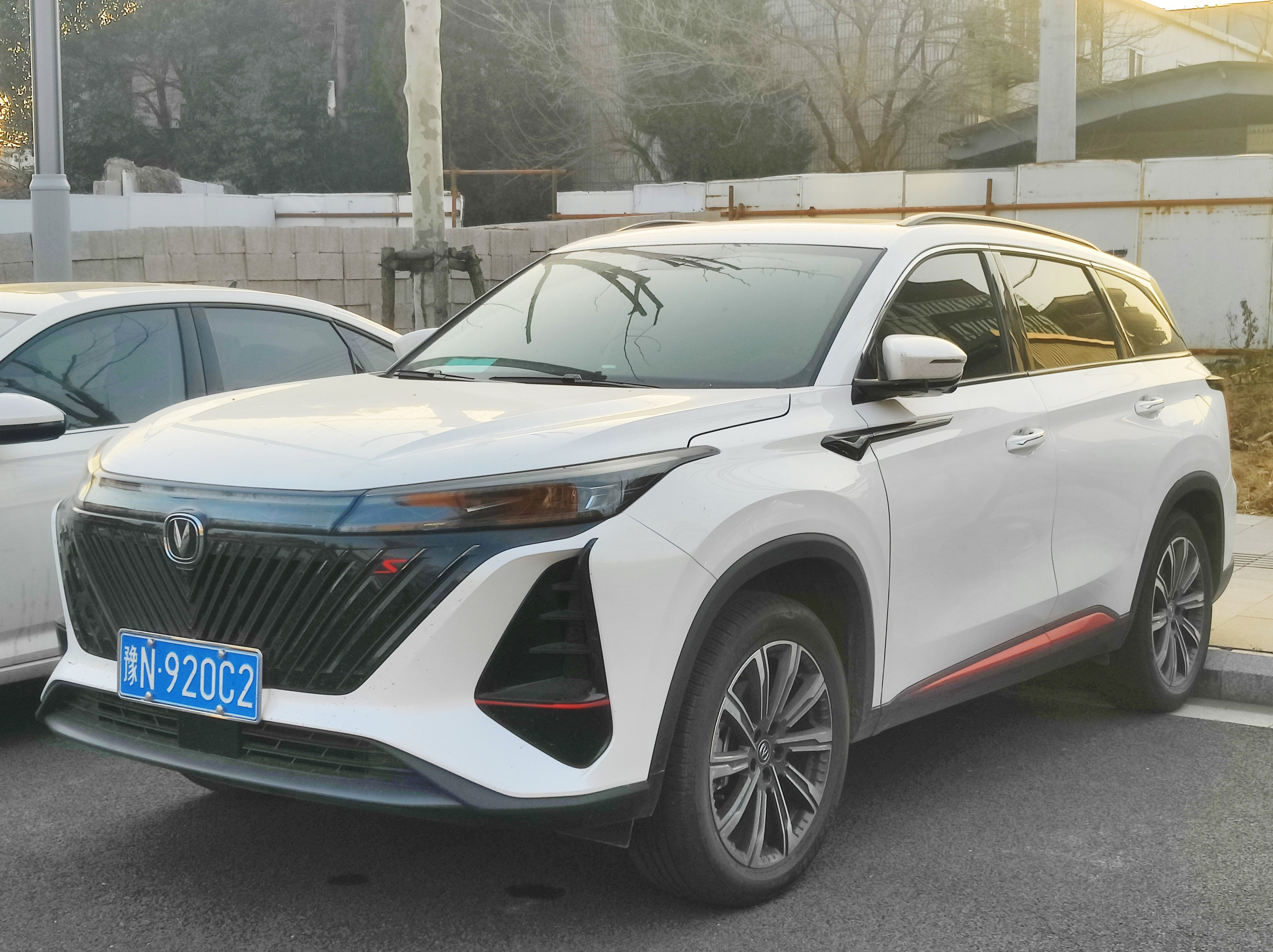
2022 facelift (marketed as CS75 Plus II)

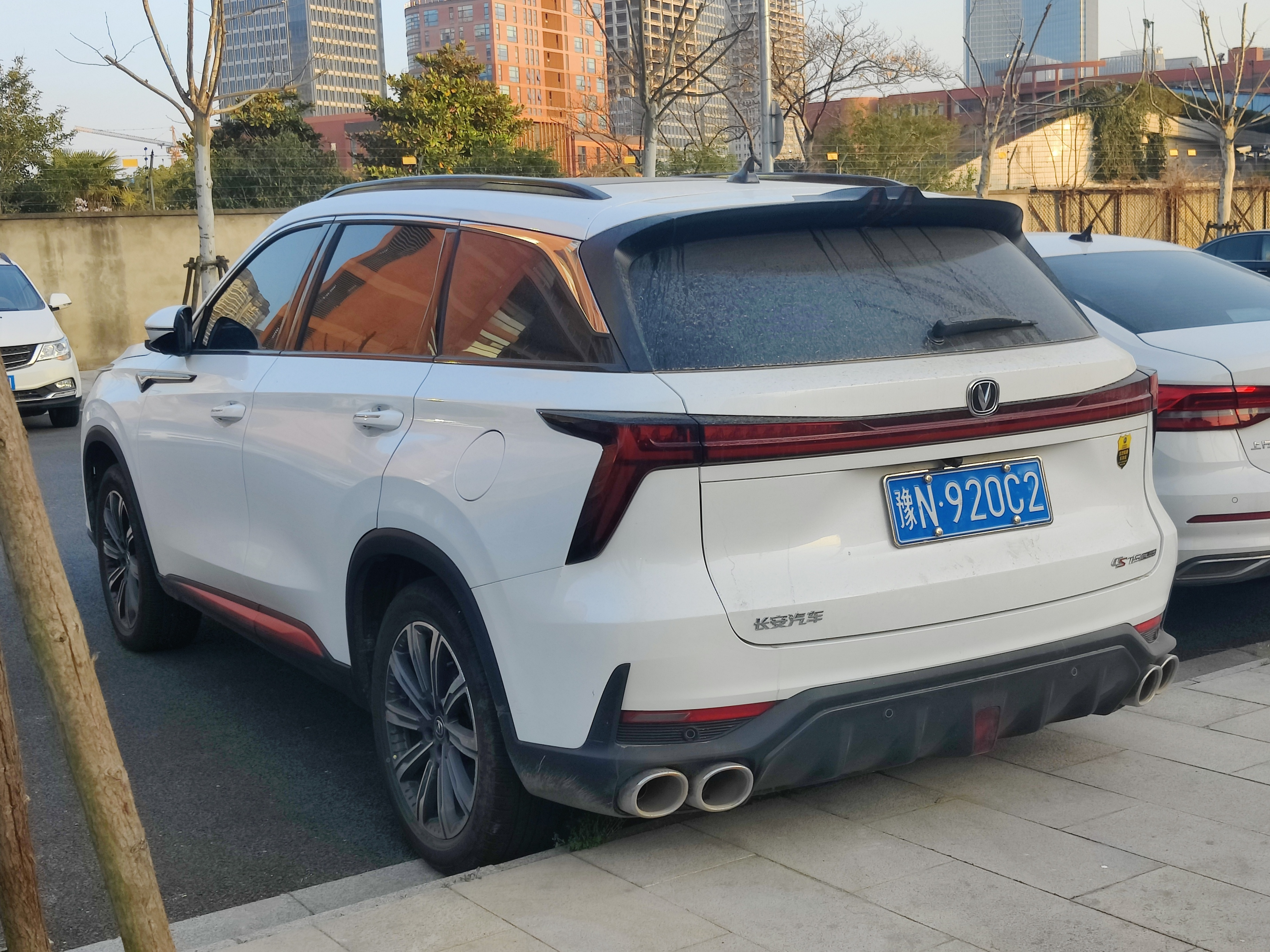

An updated model marketed as the "second generation CS75 Plus" was introduced for the 2022 model year, selling alongside the first generation model which was also updated for the 2022 model year with updated engine options and the regular CS75 models. The second generation CS75 Plus features redesigned front and rear end while retaining the side profile of the original CS75 Plus, essentially being an extensive facelift.

The 2022 CS75 Plus is powered by two updated engine options including a 1.5-litre turbo engine producing 188 horsepower (140 kW; 191 PS) and 300 N⋅m (221 lb⋅ft; 31 kg⋅m) of torque, and a 2.0-litre turbo engine producing 233 horsepower (174 kW; 236 PS) and 390 N⋅m (288 lb⋅ft; 40 kg⋅m) of torque. Both engines are mated to an 8-speed automatic transmission serving as the lone gearbox option.

=== 2023 facelift (marketed as third generation) ===
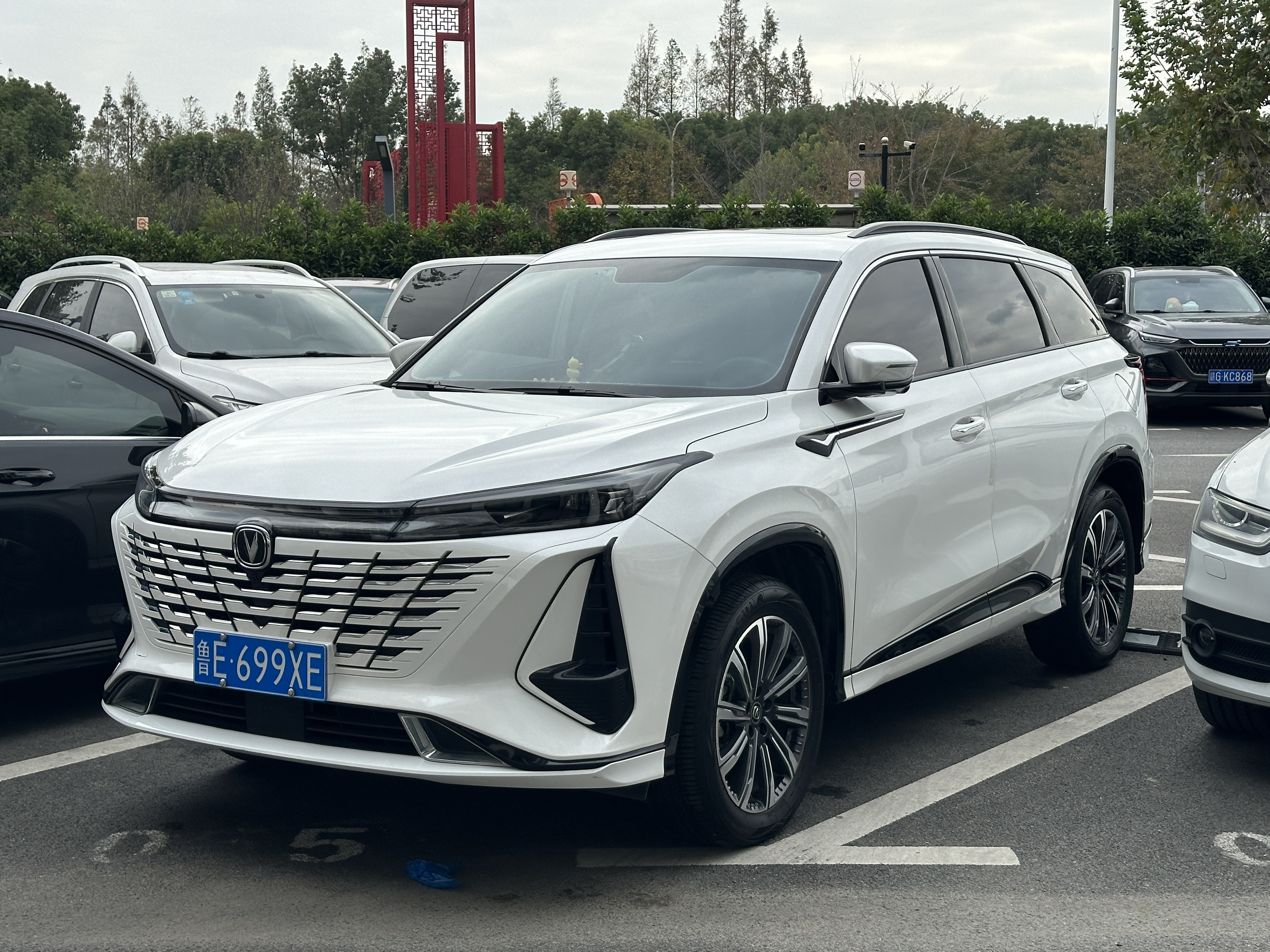
2023 facelift (marketed as CS75 Plus III)

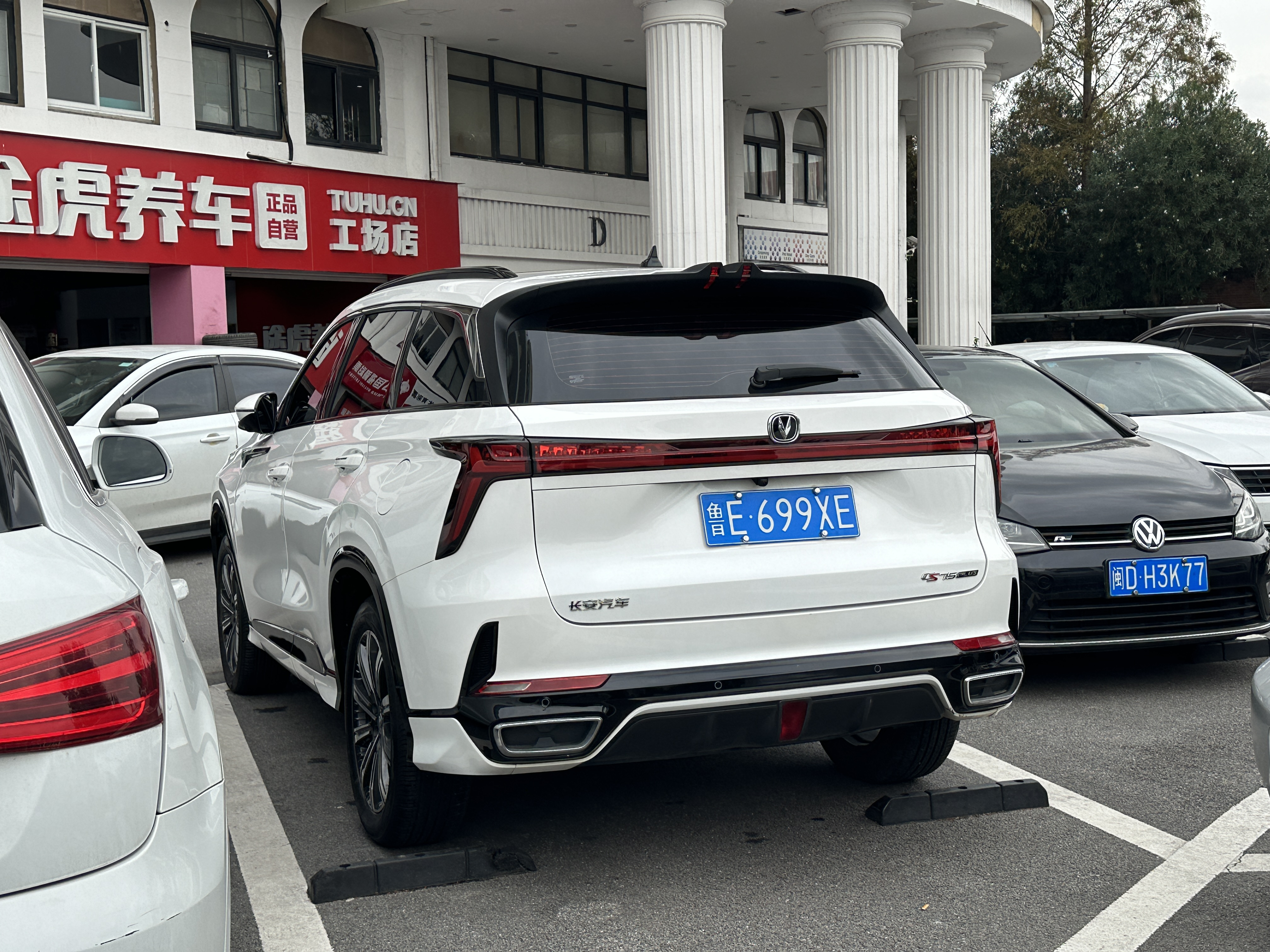

On April 26, 2023, another facelift of the CS75 Plus marketed as the "third generation" was launched. Like the previous 2022 facelift, it is a facelift rather than an all-new generation vehicle, with a new front clip and a different lower rear bumper section. Powertrain options carry over unchanged from the previous generation, with a choice of 1.5 or 2.0-litre turbocharged inline-four engines routed through an 8-speed automatic transmission for front-wheel drive. The interior also remains seemingly unchanged from the previous generation.

== Third generation (CS75 Plus Gen.4,2024) ==
Changan CS75 Plus (third generation)
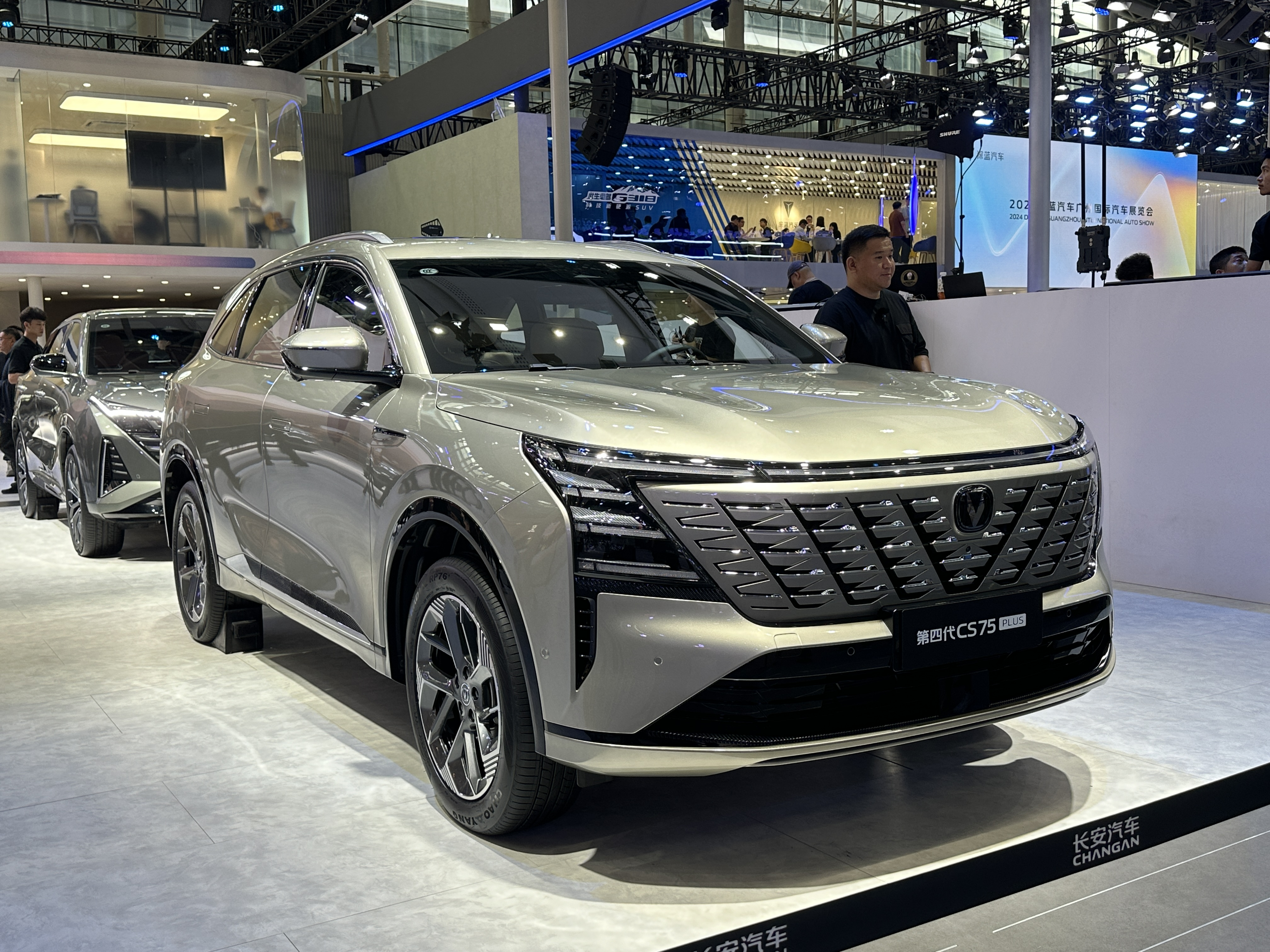

Overview
- Manufacturer: Changan Automobile
- Model code: C928
- Production: 2024–present
- Model years: 2025–present
- Assembly: China

Body and chassis
- Body style: 5-door SUV
- Layout: Front-engine, front-wheel-drive

Powertrain
- Engine: Petrol: 1.5 L JL473ZQ7 I4 turbo; 1.5 L JL473ZQD I4 turbo
- Transmission: 8-speed automatic
- Battery: 1.7 kWh NMC (HEV)

Dimensions
- Wheelbase: 2,800 mm (110.2 in)
- Length: 4,770 mm (187.8 in)
- Width: 1,910 mm (75.2 in)
- Height: 1,695 mm (66.7 in)

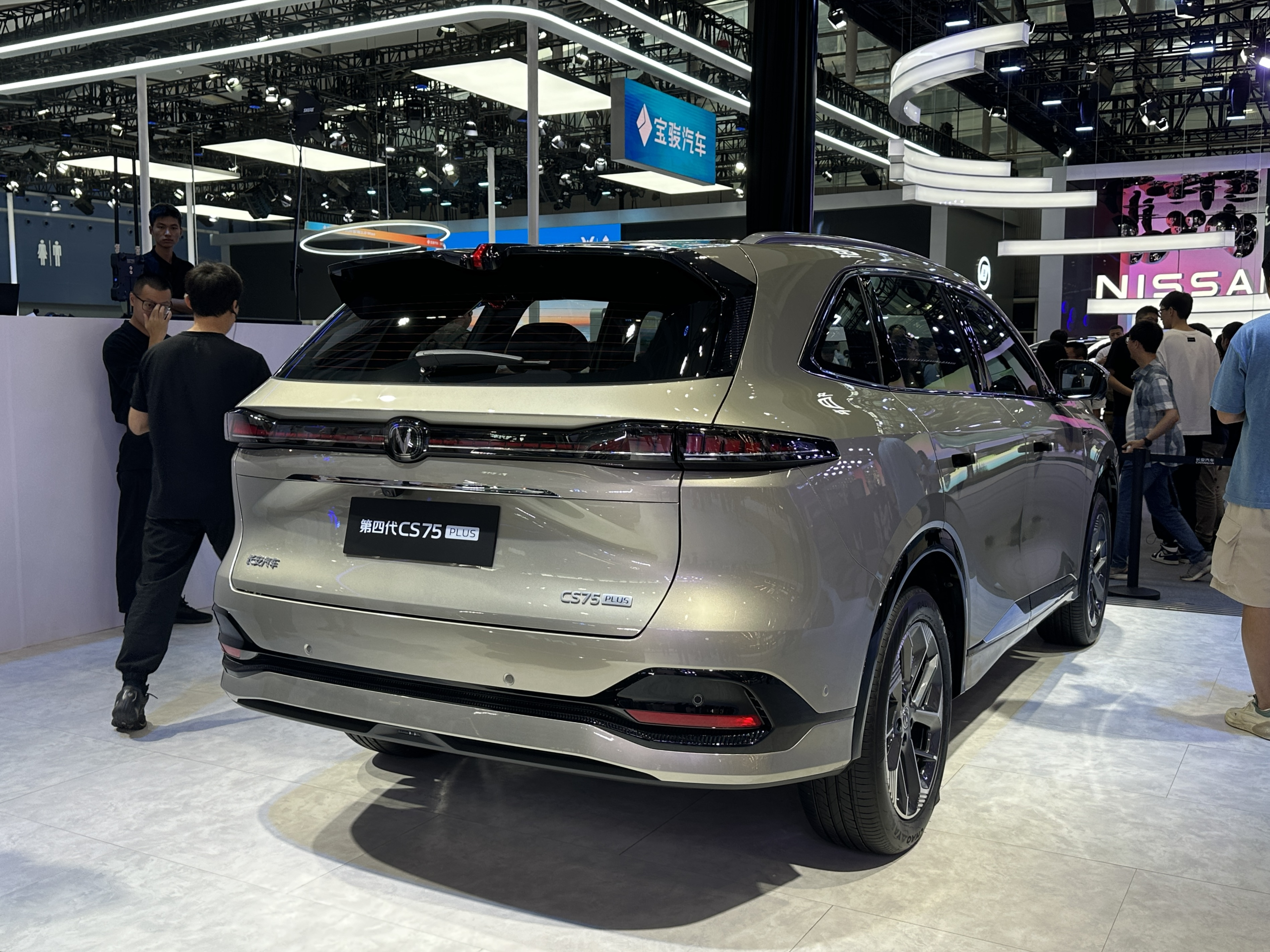
Changan CS75 Plus IV rear

In July 2024, the third generation CS75 Plus was unveiled. Codenamed C928, it was launched in September of 2024. Unlike the so-called "second" and "third" generations, it is an all-new design and is significantly larger in size at 60 mm (2.4 in) longer, 45 mm (1.8 in) wider, 15 mm (0.59 in) shorter, and with a 90 mm (3.5 in) longer wheelbase.

The exterior features an all new design, with a body color painted grille, a larger lower air intake, retractable power door handles, 'light bar' daytime running lights and taillights, and illuminated front and rear emblems. The styling resembles vehicles in Changan's 'Uni' subbrand despite it being part of the 'CS' line.

The interior features a continuous flat panel integrated into the dashboard which houses three displays: a 10.25-inch digital gauge cluster, a 14.6-inch central infotainment display, and a 12.3-inch passenger entertainment display. It has a two-spoke flat bottomed steering wheel with a column shifter. The center console features dual wireless charging pads and circular cupholders, below which is an open storage space. The front passenger seat has power adjustable thigh support, and has a 'zero-gravity' reclining mode which allows for a neutral spine posture.

At launch, the sole powertrain option is a 1.5-liter turbocharged four-cylinder petrol engine outputting 141 kW (189 hp; 192 PS) and 310 N⋅m (229 lb⋅ft) of torque, mated to an eight-speed torque converter automatic transmission with front-wheel drive. A second engine option, a 2.0-liter turbocharged four-cylinder, became available starting in December 2024.

=== 2026 facelift and HEV ===
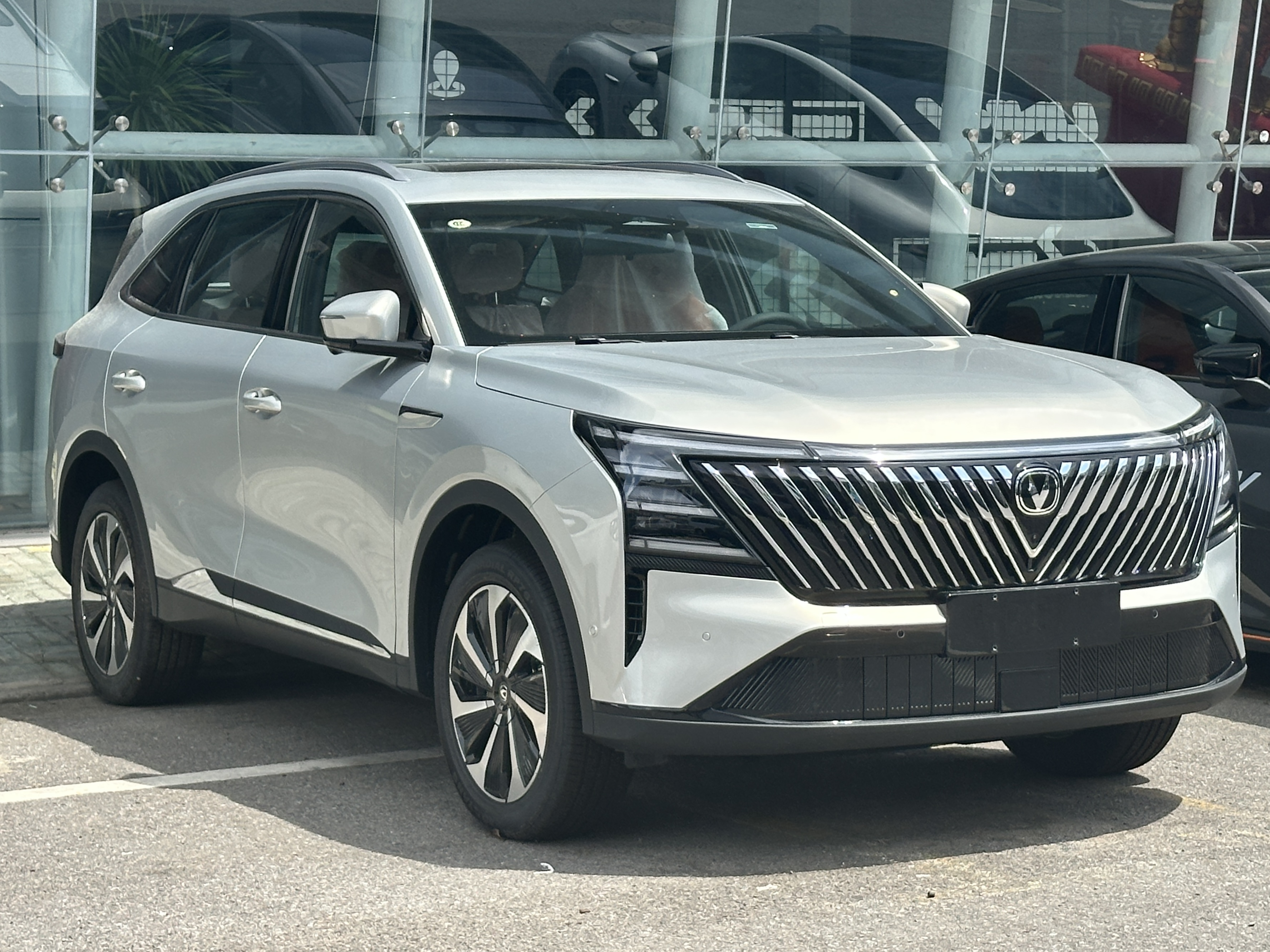
Changan CS75 Plus HEV (MY2026)

In March 2026, the hybrid version was revealed, and is set to launch at the 2026 Beijing Auto Show. It is one of the first to use Changan's BlueCore iDE-H hybrid system, which consists of a 148 hp (110 kW; 150 PS) 1.5-liter turbocharged petrol engine paired with a P1 and 241 hp (180 kW; 244 PS) P3 motor and a 1.7 kWh NMC battery pack. Changan says the Blue Whale engine has a peak thermal efficiency of 44.28% and average thermal efficiency of 40.9% with 56.3% of the engine operating range exceeding 41% efficiency, which is achieved by using a 16:1 compression ratio, 30% exhaust gas recirculation, 500-bar direct injection, and a 1.45:1 stroke to bore ratio. The 180 kW P3 electric motor weighs 18.1 kg (40 lb) and has a maximum speed of 20,000 rpm, which uses a triple-V magnet layout within 0.2mm high magnetic flux steel laminations to achieve a peak efficiency of 98.1% with 92.8% drivetrain efficiency. It is powered by a 1.7 kWh NMC battery pack capable of a 50C peak discharge rate for up to 80 kW (107 hp; 109 PS). It has a top speed of 185 km/h (115 mph) and a combined cycle fuel economy rating of 4.69 L/100 km (50.2 mpg_{‑US}).

== CS75 Pro (2025) ==
The Changan CS75 Pro is a mid-size crossover SUV variant of CS75 series as the entry variant with a cheaper price tag. Launched in March 2025, the Oshan X7/Oshan X7 Plus/Changan X7 Plus was renamed to CS75 Pro as Oshan brand was discontinued in 2024. The Changan CS75 Pro now features a new front bumper grille design that were made of silver metallic clips that resembles on a second-generation CS55 Plus. Unlike the Pakistani-made model 2024 facelift, the rear chrome bar at the trunk lid that it no longer spelling "Oshan", as Oshan brand was discontinued in 2024, and a sport red strip that it no longer stick at the front bumper and side skirts that were featured on Oshan X7 Plus. The interior and a powertrain of a CS75 Pro was seemingly unchanged from the previous two X7 Plus. The Changan CS75 Pro is also appears to be a successor to the Changan CS85 Coupe, and a slightly large Changan CS95 which is also the mid-size crossover SUV segment.

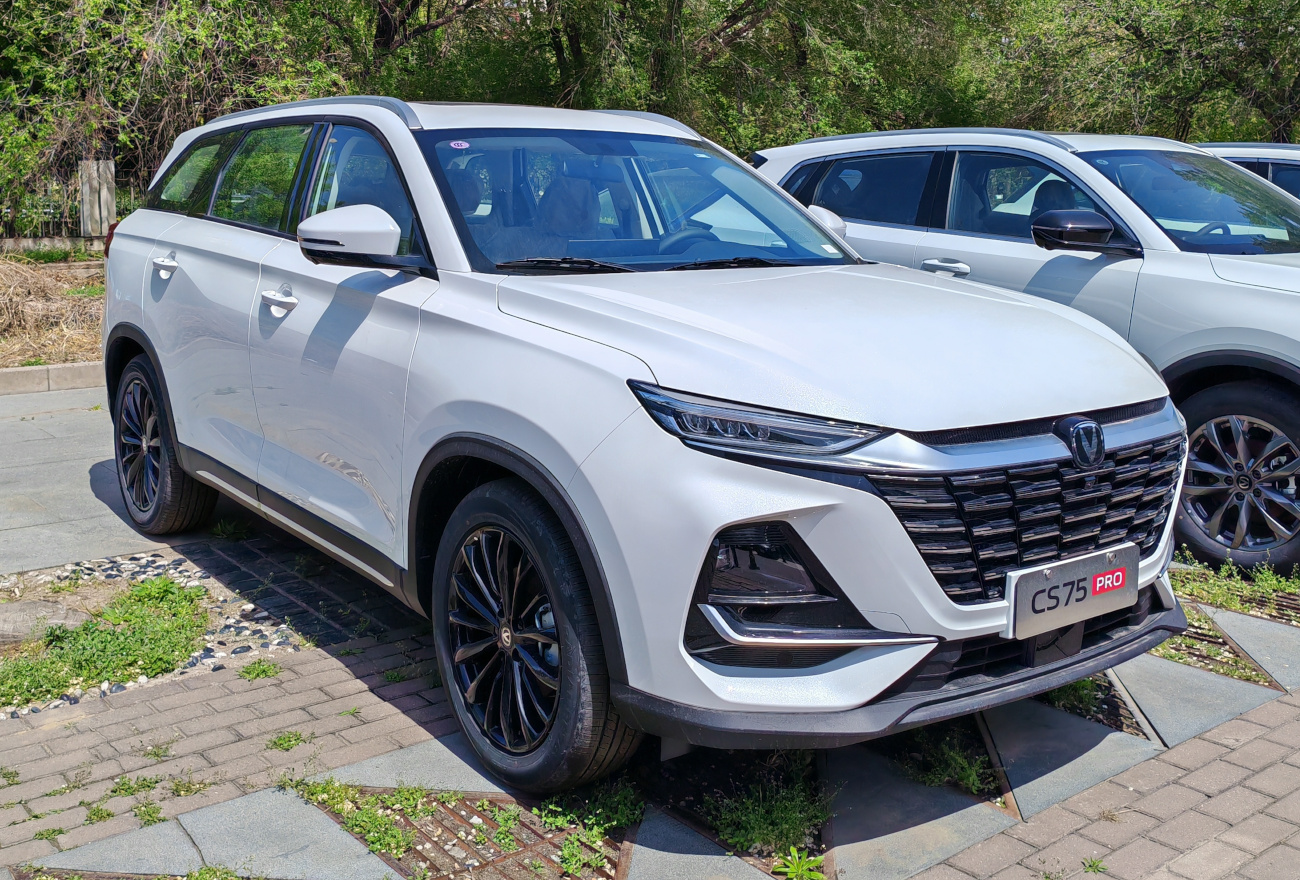
Changan CS75 Pro

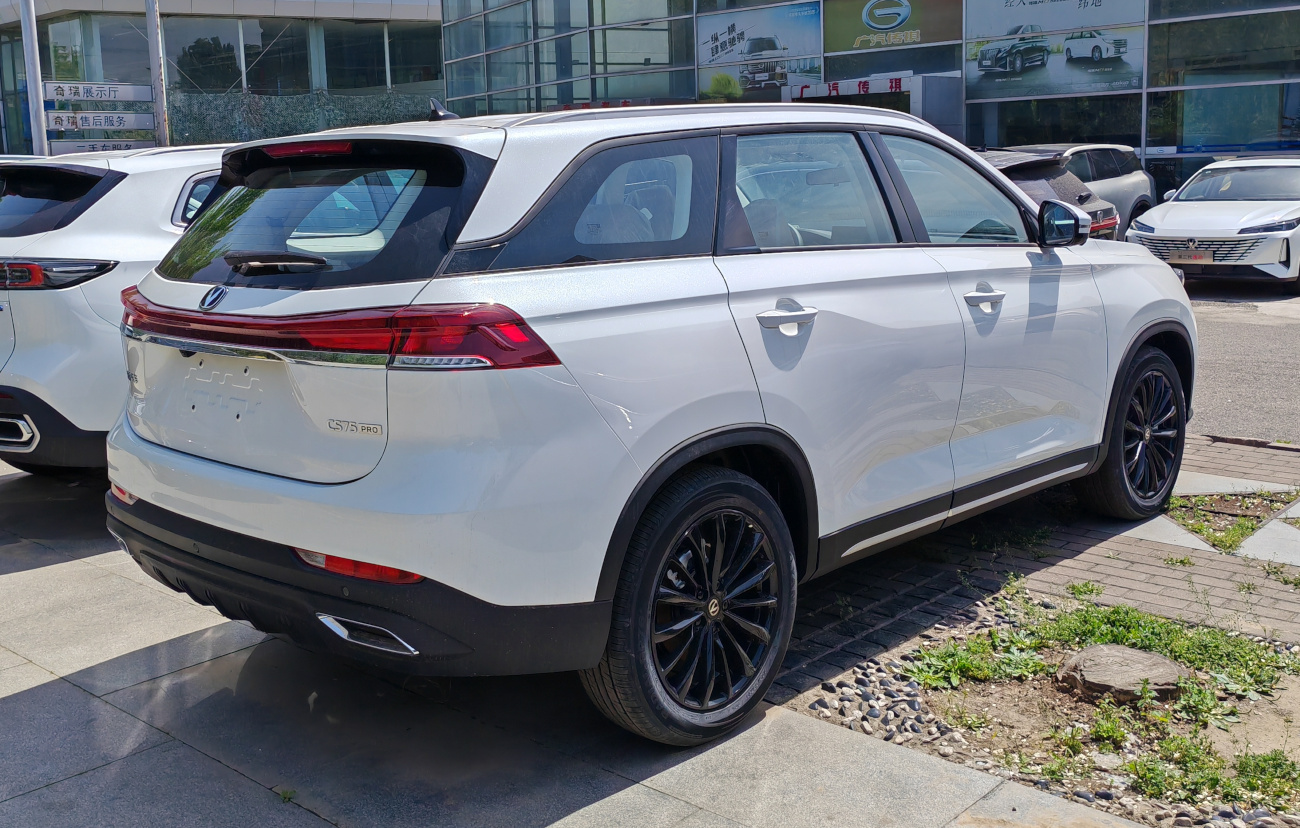
Changan CS75 Pro

== Sales ==
Year	China			Mexico	Total production
Year	CS75	CS75 Plus	CS75 Plus iDD	Mexico	Total production
2021					281,862
2022					237,615
2023	63,354	188,376	875		253,611
2024	38,836	170,705	2,205		225,278
2025	26,017	154,861	12	695 (Note: Figure may be CS75 Plus combined with CS75 Pro)	217,522
