= Changan CS95 =

Chinese full-size SUV

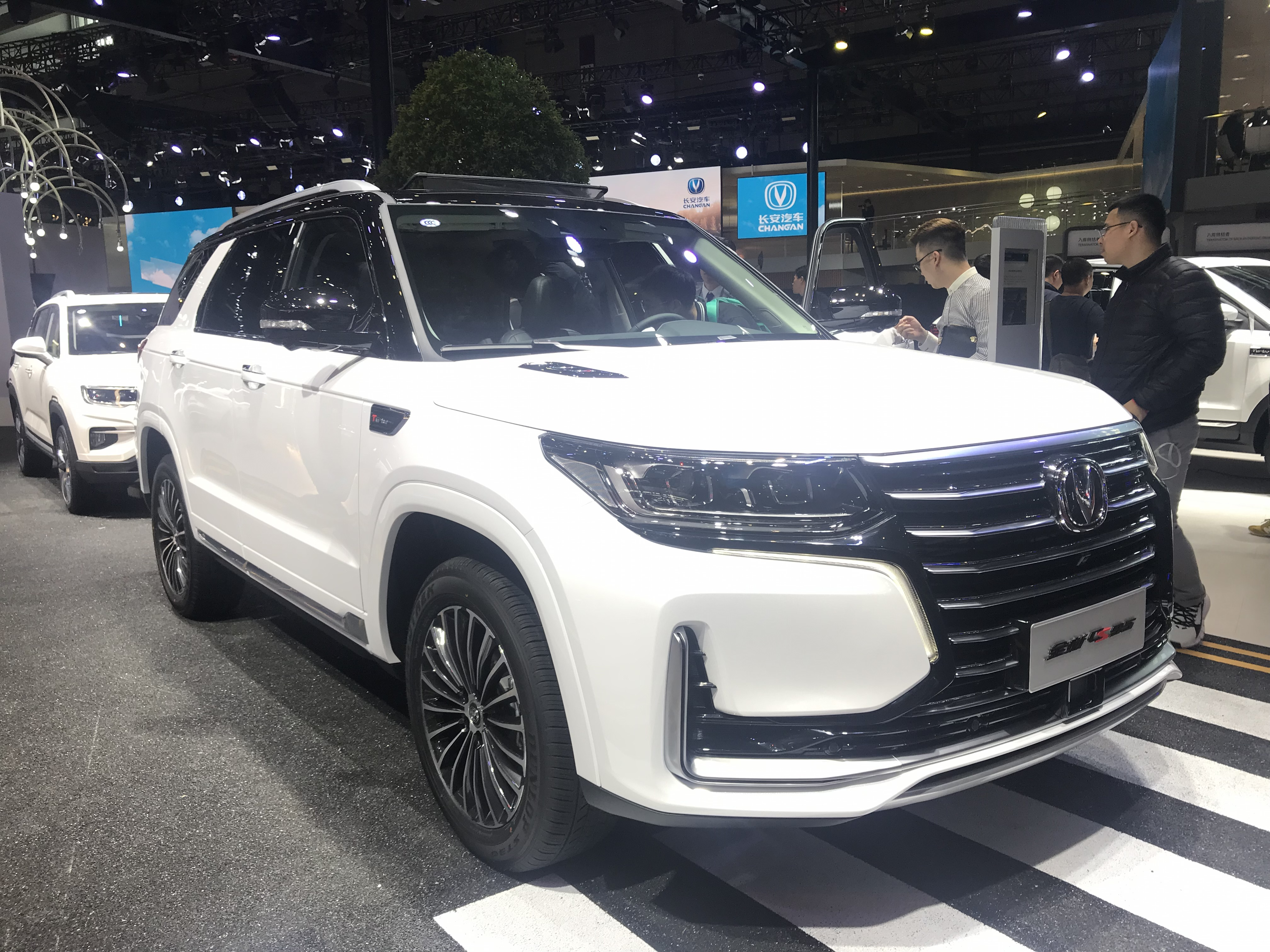

Overview
- Manufacturer: Changan Automobile
- Production: 2017–2025
- Assembly: China: Beijing

Body and chassis
- Class: Full-size SUV
- Body style: 5-door SUV
- Layout: Front-engine, front-wheel-drive Front-engine, four-wheel-drive

Powertrain
- Engine: 2.0 L JL486ZQ3 I4 (turbo petrol)
- Transmission: 6-speed automatic

Dimensions
- Wheelbase: 2,810 mm (110.6 in)
- Length: 4,949 mm (194.8 in)
- Width: 1,930 mm (76.0 in)
- Height: 1,785–1,790 mm (70.3–70.5 in)

The Changan CS95 is a full-size SUV produced by Changan Automobile. It was previewed by a pre-production show car on the 2016 Beijing Auto Show.

== Overview ==
The production version of the Changan CS95 SUV for China was unveiled on the 2016 Guangzhou Auto Show, with the launch on the Chinese auto market in 2017. Despite the name, it was a completely different vehicle to the Changan CS95 Concept revealed in Auto Shanghai 2013. Pricing ranges from 159,800 yuan to 229,800 yuan ($23,185 – 33,342 USD). The CS95 is the largest passenger car under the Changan product range. The CS95 is available as both five and seven-seater variants, and is powered by a 2.0 turbo with 233 hp (174 kW) and 360 N⋅m (266 lb⋅ft) of torque. The only gearbox available is six-speed automatic and equipped with Changan’s NexTrac AWD system. The Changan CS95 has faced criticism for resembling the Land Rover Discovery L462 regarding its styling.

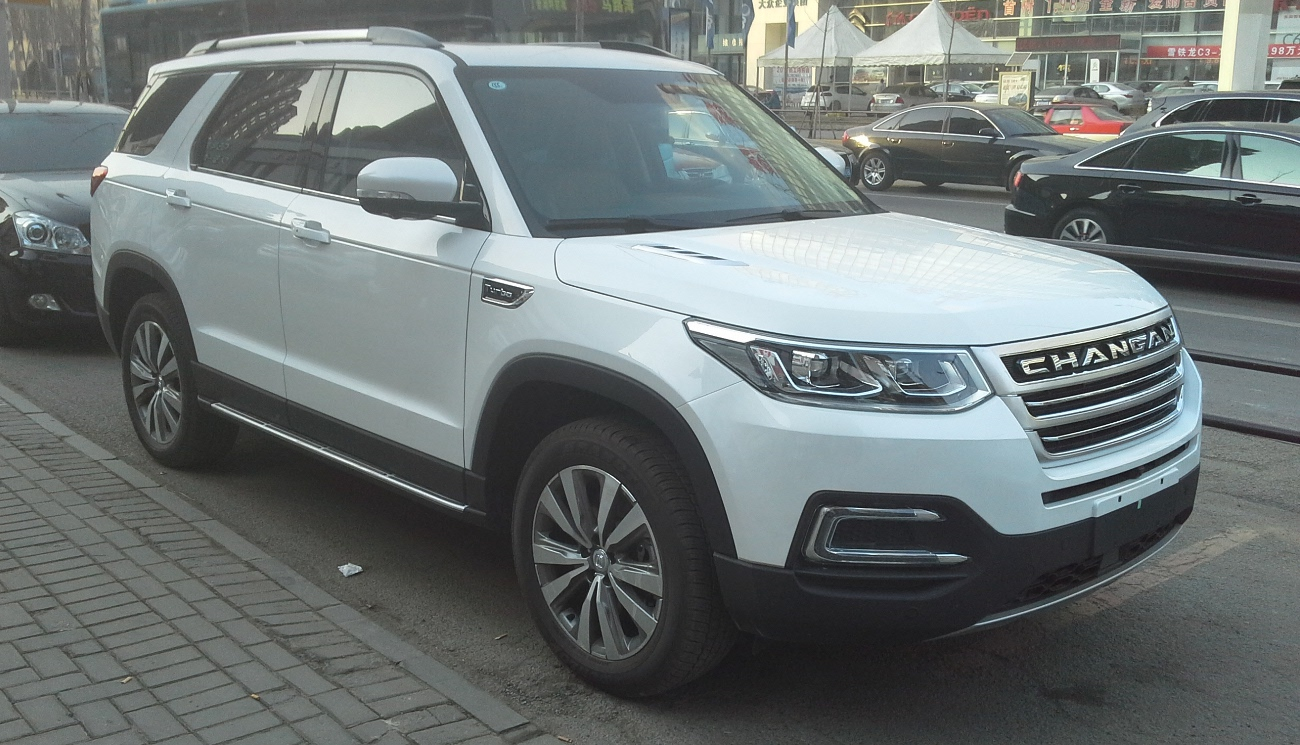
Changan CS95 pre-facelift front.

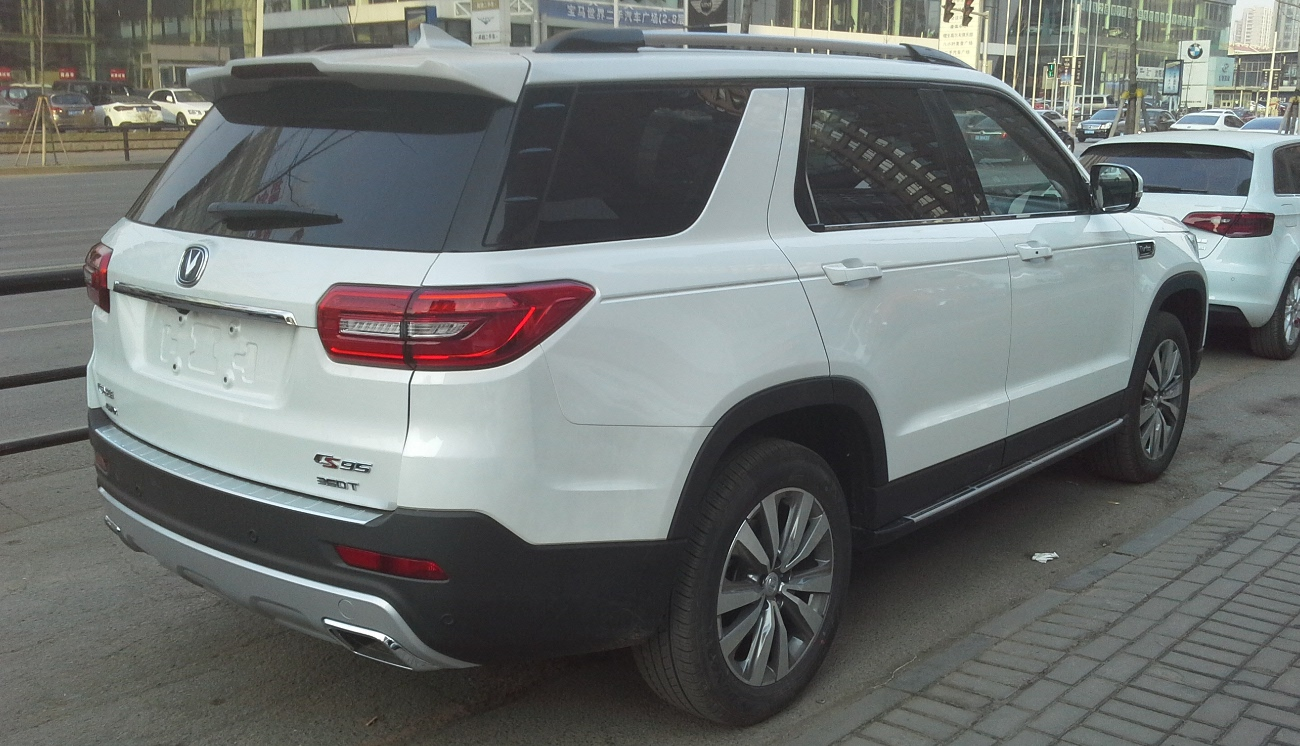
Changan CS95 pre-facelift rear.

=== 2018 facelift ===
A facelift was revealed in 2018 featuring the latest Changan family DRG with connected tail lamps in the rear. The powertrain of the 2018 facelift model remains to be the same.

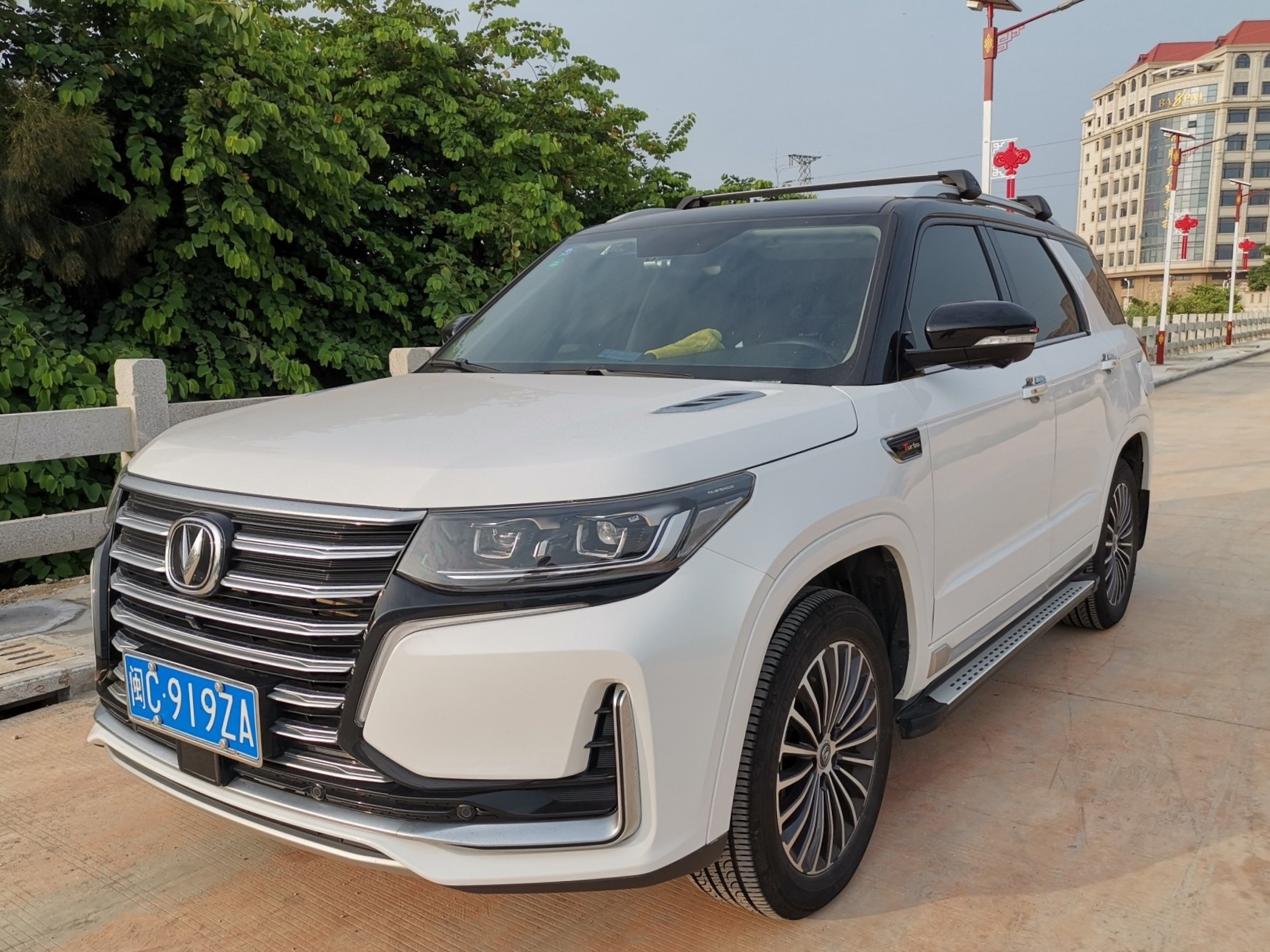
Changan CS95 facelift front.

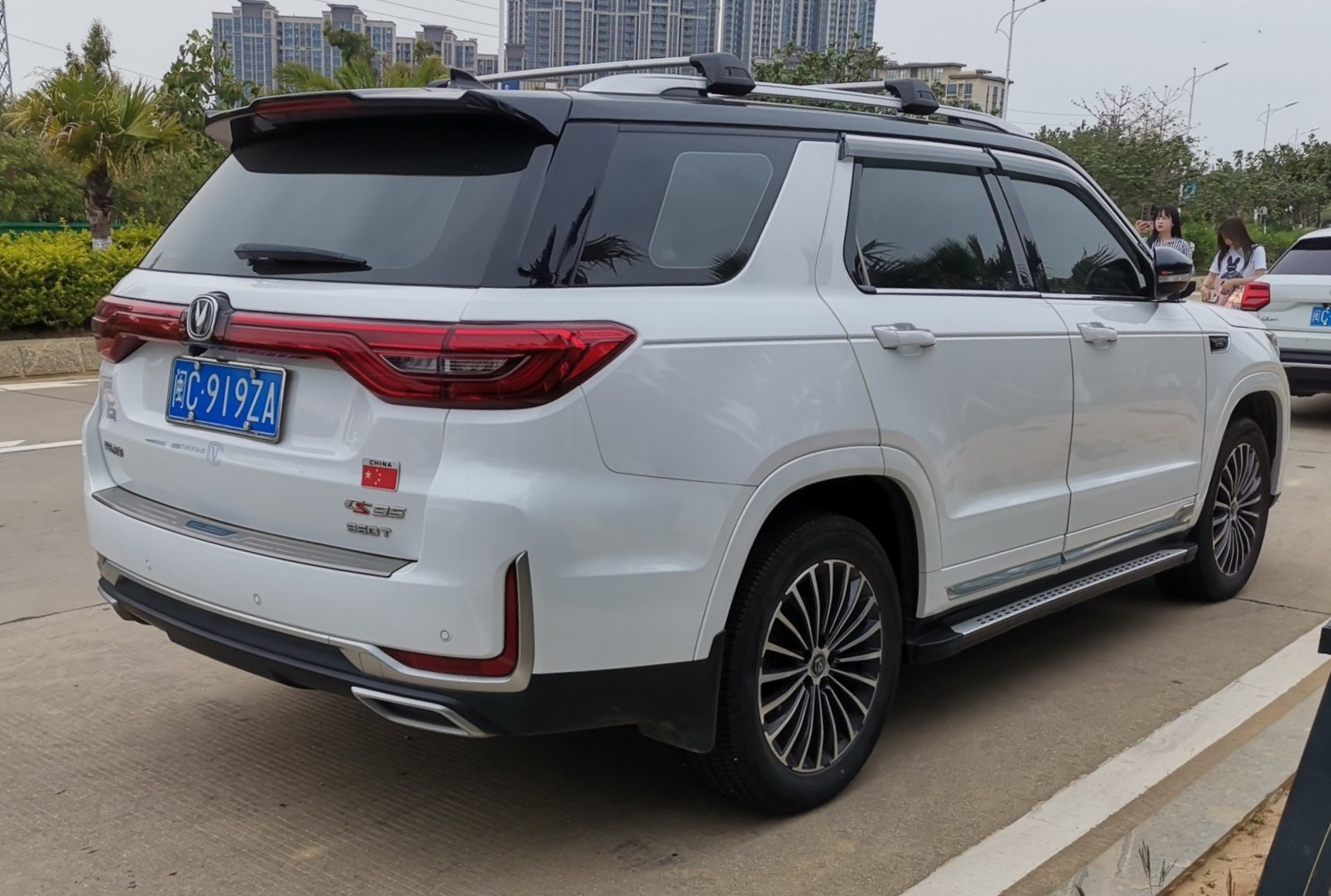
Changan CS95 facelift rear.

=== Changan CS95 Plus ===
Another facelift was launched in February 2023 called the Changan CS95 Plus.

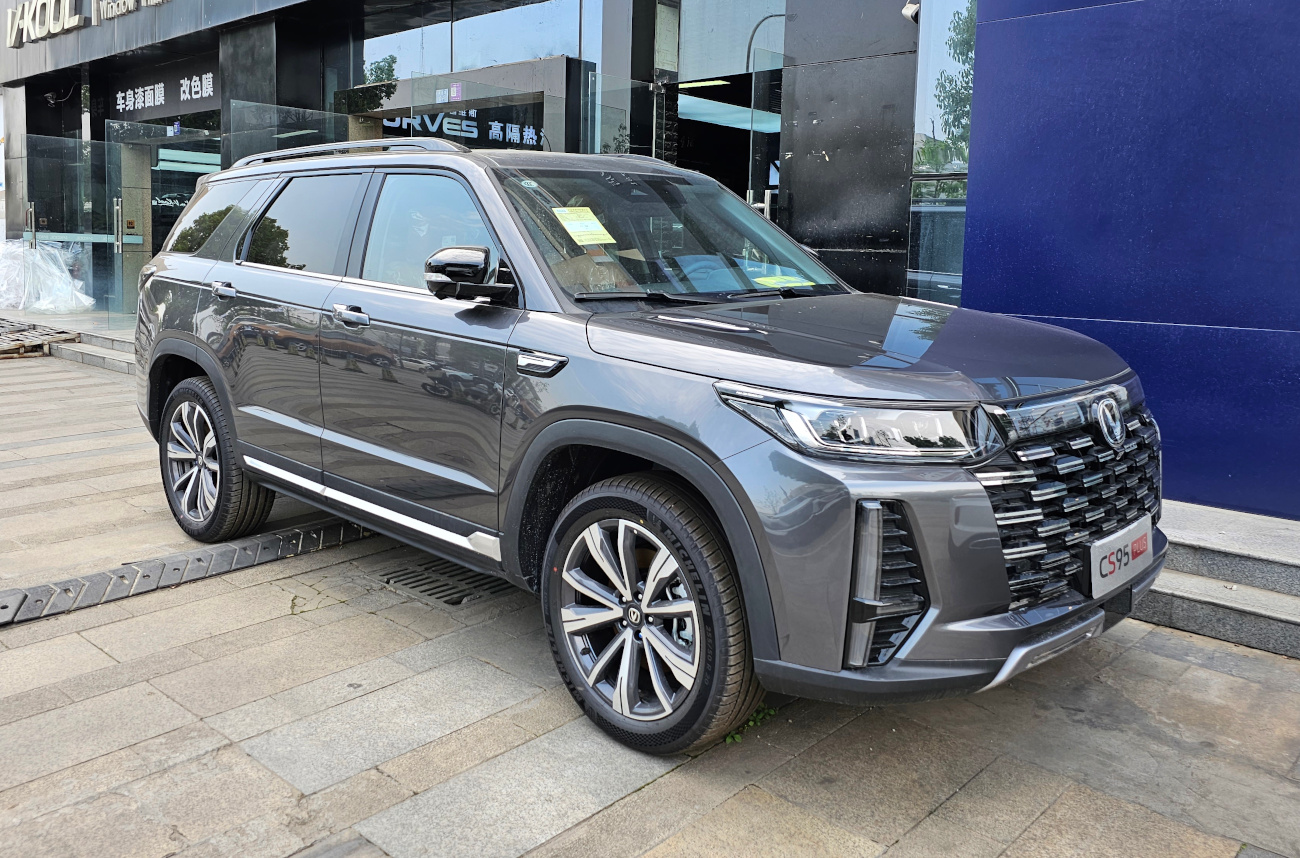
Changan CS95 Plus front.

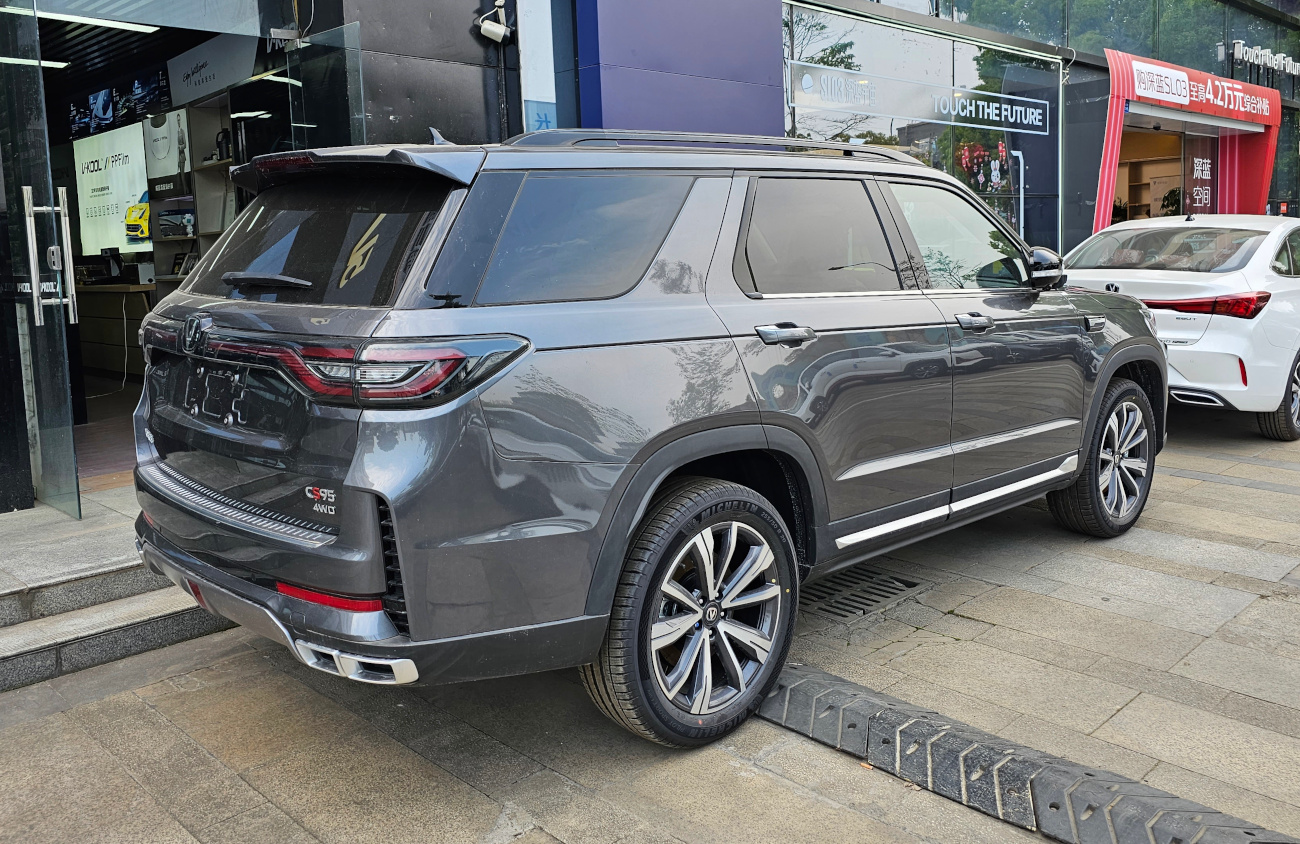
Changan CS95 Plus rear.

== Sales ==
Year	Mexico
2025	120
