= S70 =

S70 or S-70 may refer to:

== Aircraft ==
- Sikorsky S-70, an American military helicopter family
- SIPA S.70, a French prototype transport aircraft
- Sukhoi S-70 Okhotnik-B, a Russian prototype UCAV

== Automobiles ==
- BMW S70, an automobile engine
- Daihatsu Hijet (S70), a Japanese kei truck
- Jinbei S70, a Chinese crossover
- Toyota Crown (S70), a Japanese sedan
- Traum S70, a Chinese crossover
- Volvo S70, a compact executive car
- Proton S70, a compact C-segment sedan based on the 4th generation Geely Emgrand

== Other uses ==
- Canon PowerShot S70, a digital camera
- County Route S70 (Bergen County, New Jersey)
- HMAS Ovens (S 70), a submarine of the Royal Australian Navy
- Siemens S70, also Avanto S70, a light rail vehicle
- S70, a postcode district for Barnsley, England
