= SR7 =

SR7 may refer to:

- Six Chuter SR7
- SR postcode area
- Lockheed SR-71 Blackbird
- 21791 Mattweegman
- Sony camcorders
- Soroush Rafiei
- Zotye SR7

== See also ==
- List of highways numbered 7
