= Traum (marque) =

Marque of vehicle manufacturer Zotye Auto

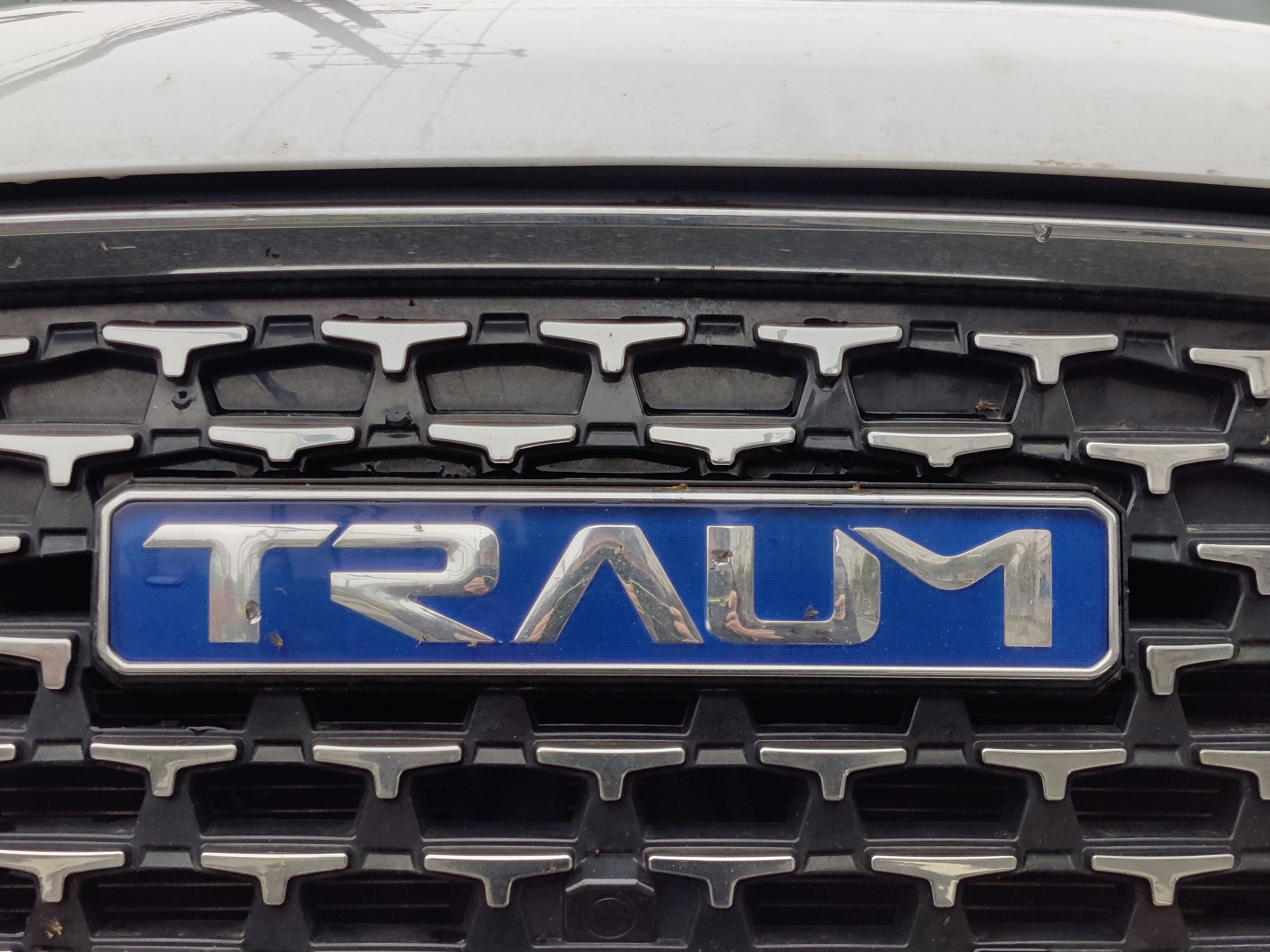
- Founded: July 2017; 8 years ago
- Headquarters: Yongkang, Zhejiang, China
- Owner: Jiangnan Automobile
- Parent: Zotye Auto
- Website: www.zjunma.com

Traum (Chinese: 君马; Chinese: 君馬; pinyin: Junma) was a car brand of the motor vehicle manufacturer Zotye International from Yongkang.

== History ==
On June 27, 2017, Zotye International announced that it would launch a new brand called Traum. After WM Motor (for world champion), this was the second Chinese brand to use a name of German origin. By 2019, Traum wanted to bring eight SUV onto the market. The brand's first vehicle, the Traum S70, was sold in China in January 2018. The Traum vehicles were built at Jiangnan Auto.

Sales of both models ended in October 2019. There were 21,795 sales reported in China for 2018 and 36,375 for the following year.

== Products ==
- Traum Meet 3 – 5-door SUV (from 2018)
- Traum Meet 5 – 5-door SUV (from 2019)
- Traum S70 – 5-door SUV (from 2018)
- Traum Seek 5 – 5-door SUV (from 2018)
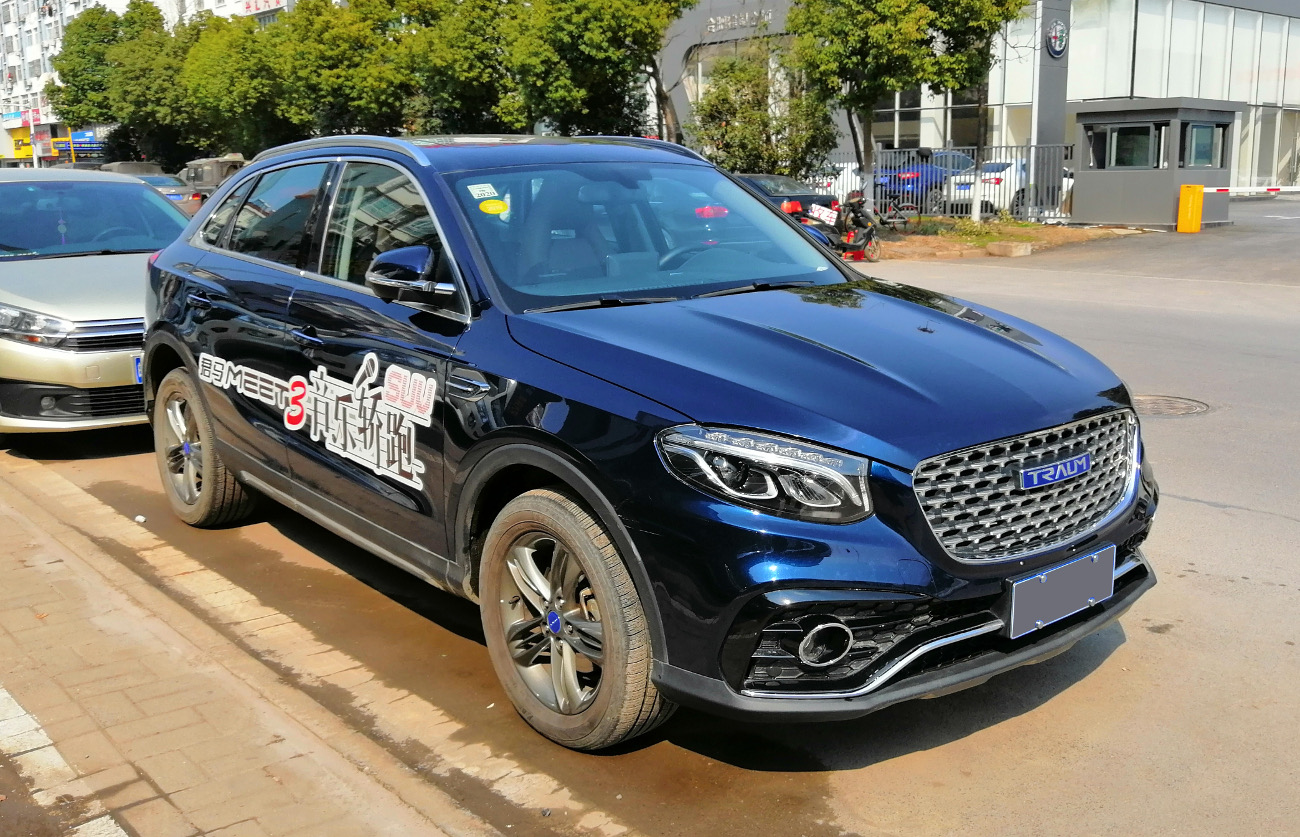
Traum Meet 3

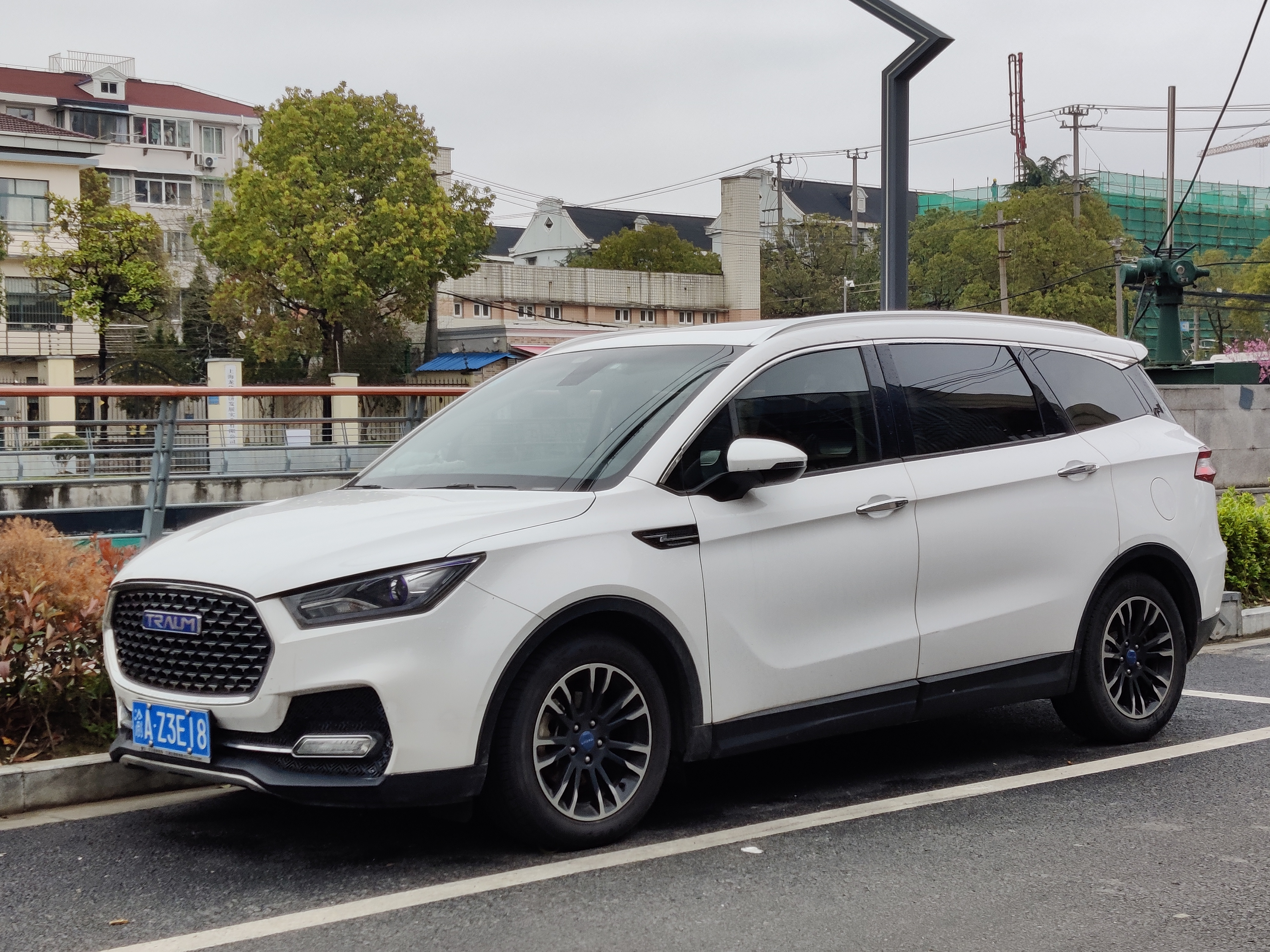
Traum S70

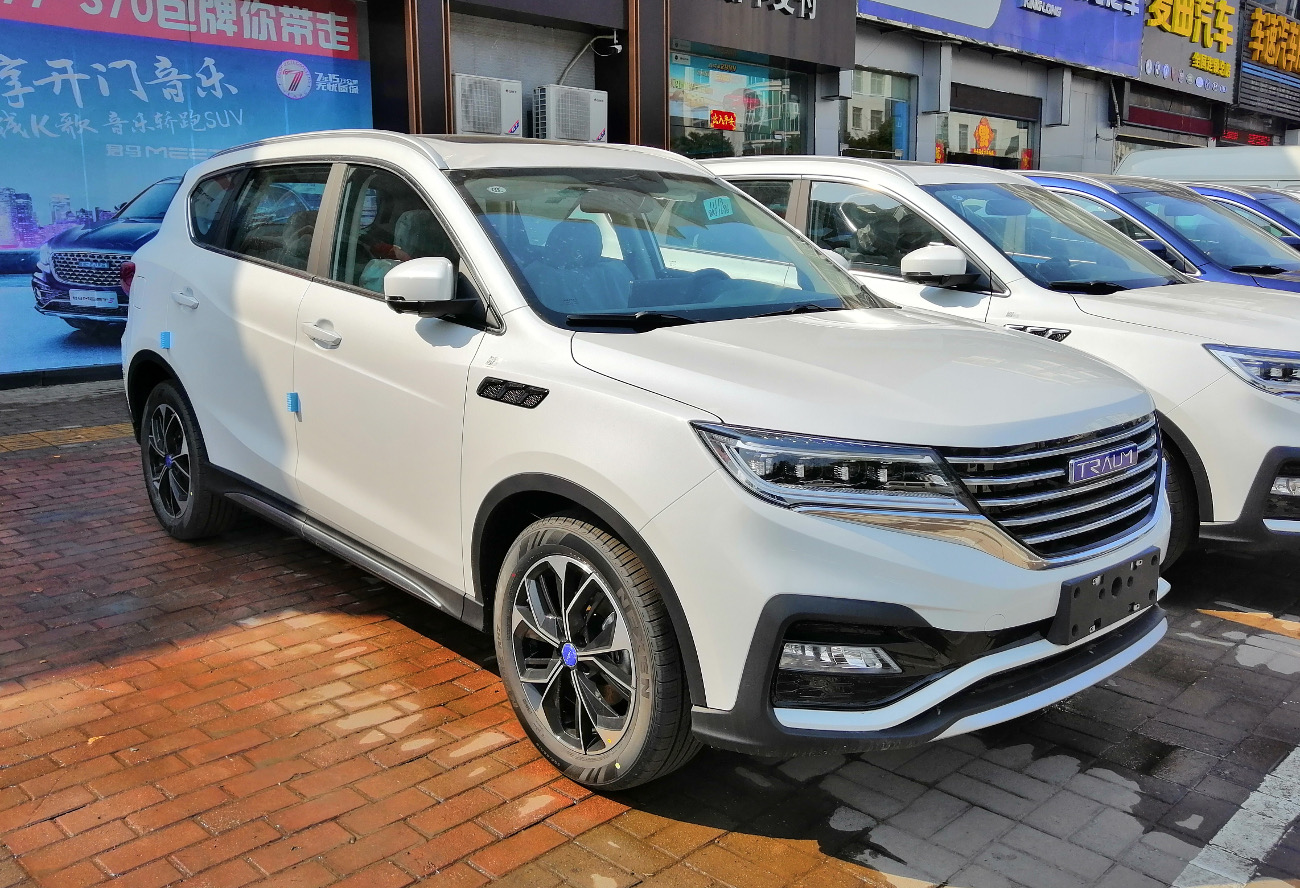
Traum Seek 5

15,708 cars of the S70 were registered in China in the first year and 8,045 cars in the second year, in total 23,753. For the Seek 5, 6,087 vehicles have been reported for the period from August to December 2018 and 28,330 for the period from January to October 2019, total 34,417. The total of 58,170 represents the brand's total sales, suggesting that neither Meet 3 nor Meet 5 went on sale.
