= Traum Meet3 =

Chinese compact SUV

Traum MEET3
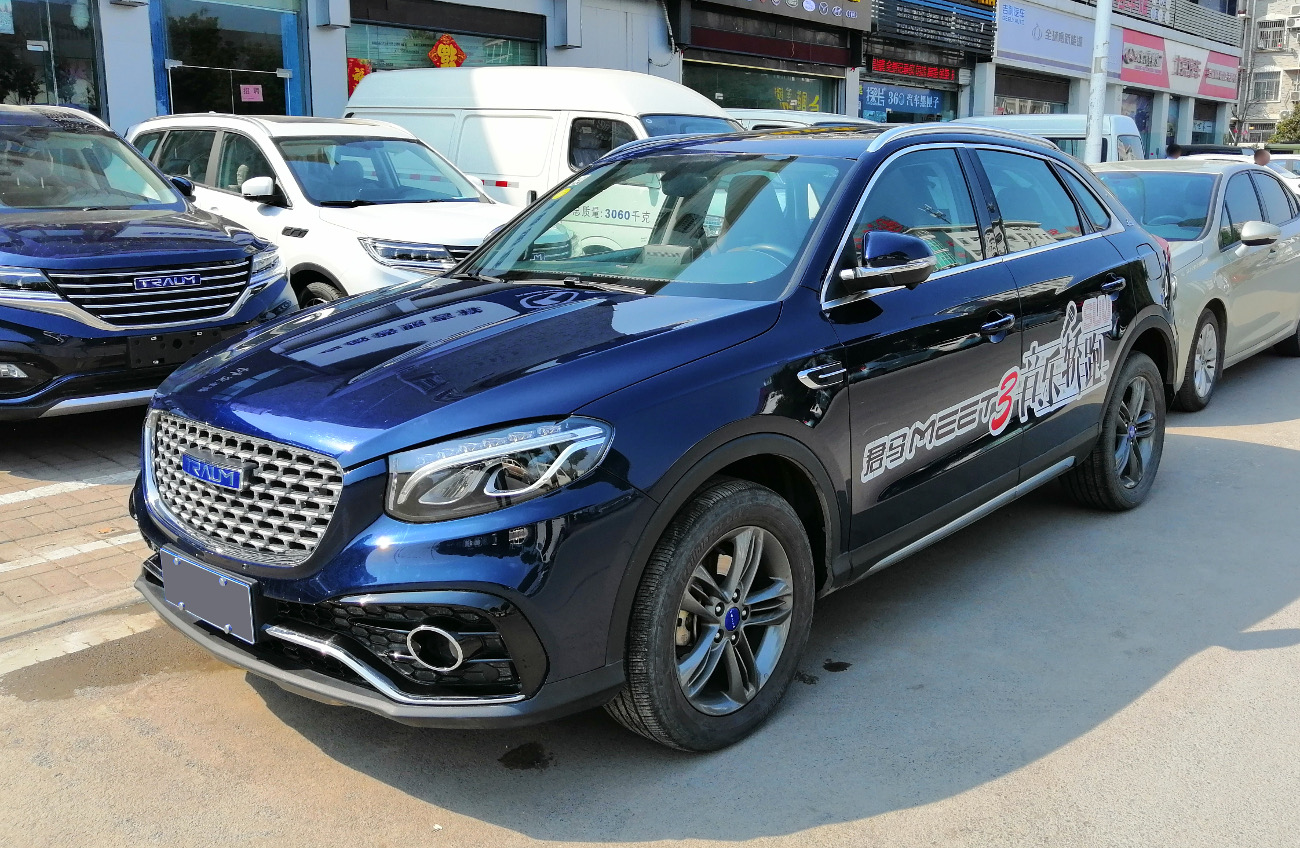

Overview
- Manufacturer: Traum
- Production: 2018–2021
- Model years: 2018–2021
- Assembly: China

Body and chassis
- Class: Compact crossover SUV
- Body style: 5-door SUV
- Layout: Front-engine, front-wheel-drive
- Related: Zotye SR7

Powertrain
- Engine: 1.5 L 4A91 turbo I4 (petrol)
- Transmission: 5 speed manual CVT

Dimensions
- Wheelbase: 2,685 mm (105.7 in)
- Length: 4,530 mm (178.3 in)
- Width: 1,838 mm (72.4 in)
- Height: 1,610 mm (63.4 in)

The Traum MEET 3 is a compact crossover SUV produced by Zotye Auto under the Traum sub-brand for the Chinese market.

== Overview ==
Based on the same platform as the Zotye SR7, the production car debuted in 2017. It was officially launched on the Chinese car market in April 2018, pricing starts from 79,900 yuan to 118,900 yuan. The MEET 3 is a controversial vehicle in terms of styling, because it heavily resembles the first generation Mercedes-Benz GLA-Class. The MEET 3 is powered by a 1.5 liter turbo straight-4 turbo engine mates to a 5-speed manual transmission or CVT.

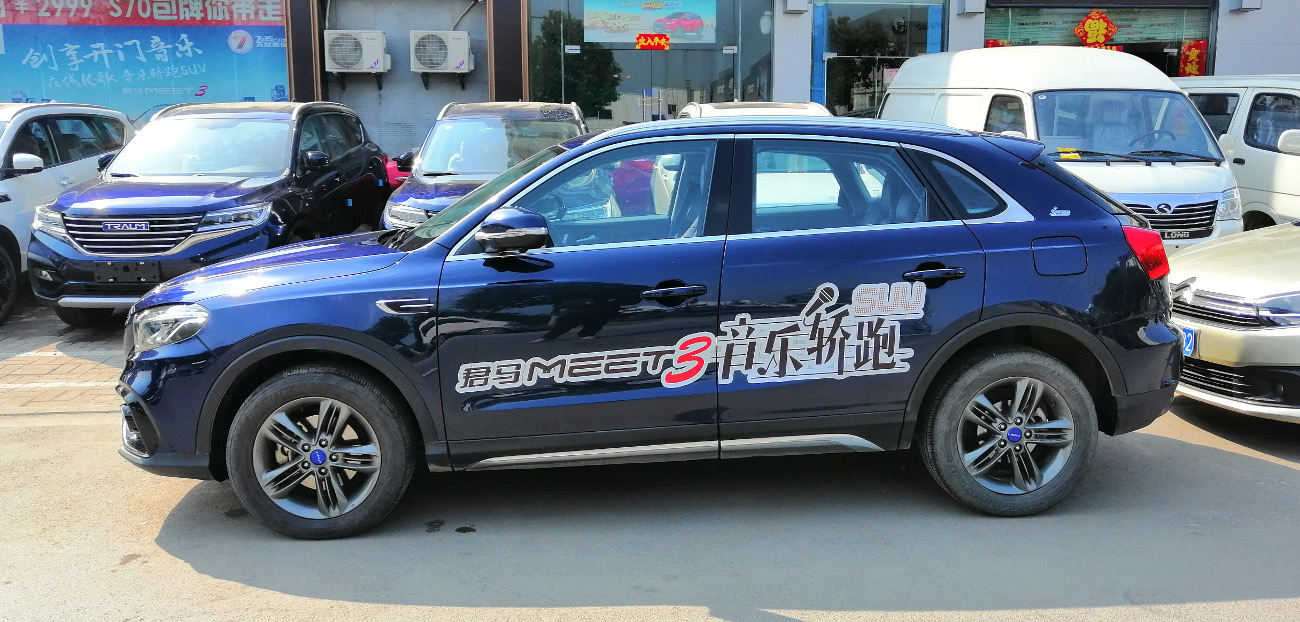
Traum MEET 3 side

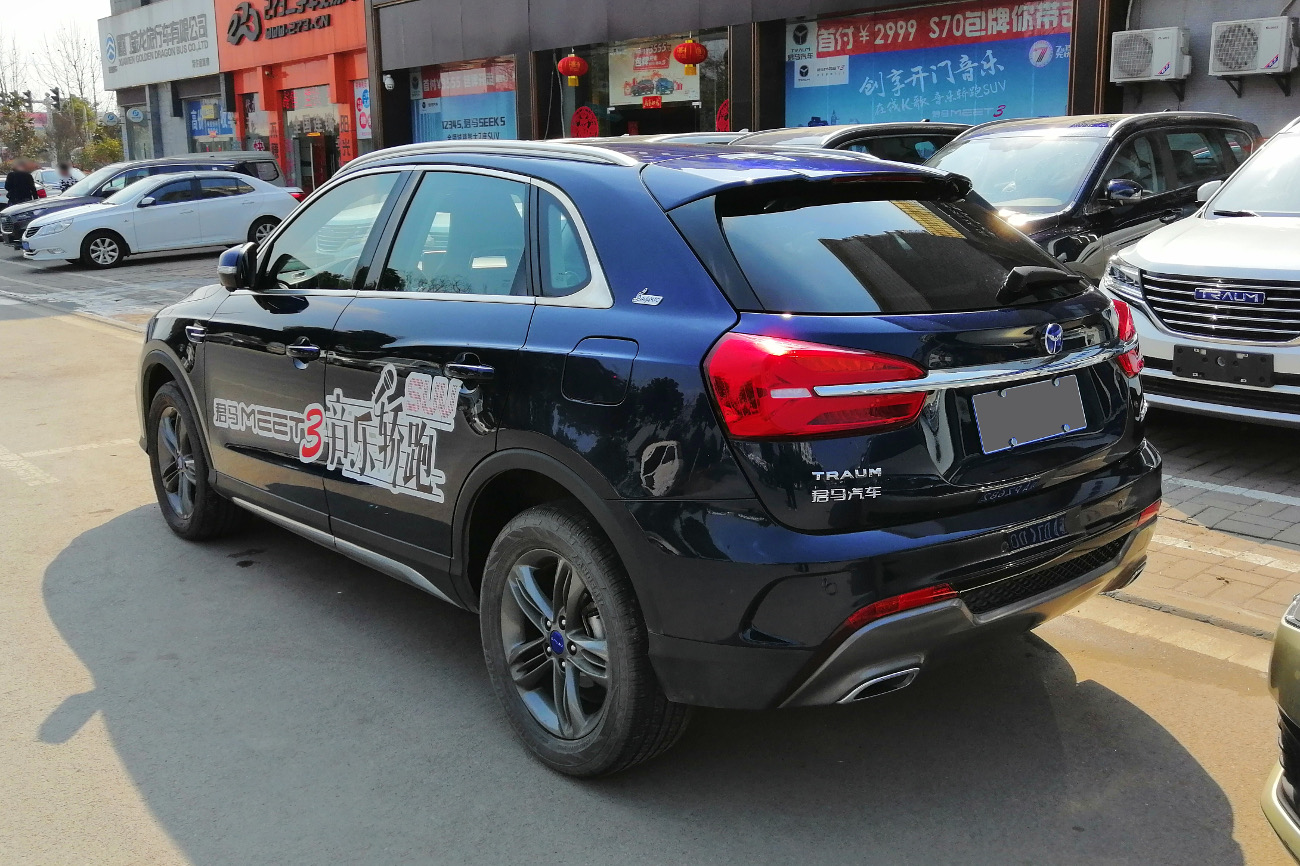
Traum MEET 3 rear
