= Ruixiang X5 =

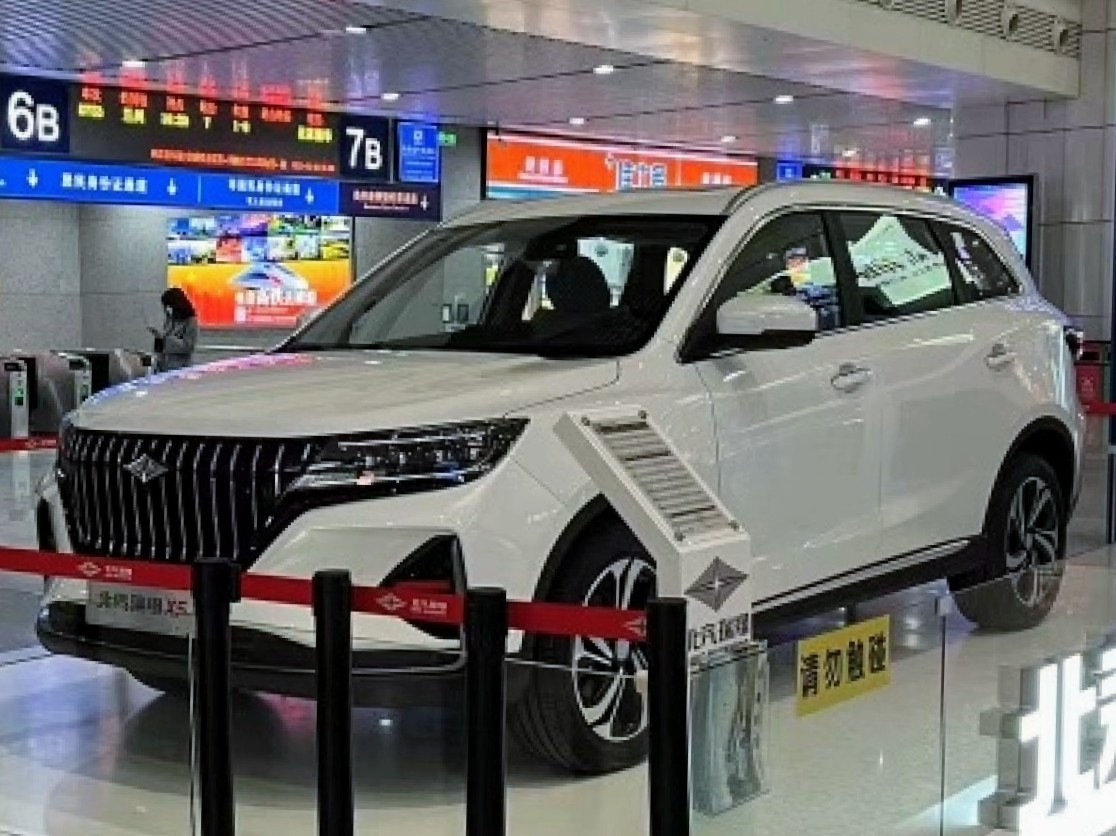

Overview
- Manufacturer: Ruixiang-Yinxiang Group
- Also called: VGV TX7; Max Motor Tiara (Iran)
- Production: 2021–present
- Model years: 2022–present

Body and chassis
- Class: Mid-size crossover SUV
- Body style: 5-door hatchback
- Layout: FF
- Related: Traum SEEK5

Powertrain
- Engine: 1.5L Turbo I4
- Transmission: 6-speed automatic 6-speed manual

Dimensions
- Wheelbase: 2,815 mm (110.8 in)
- Length: 4,788 mm (188.5 in)
- Width: 1,875 mm (73.8 in)
- Height: 1,730 mm (68.1 in)
- Curb weight: 1,560–1,610 kg (3,439–3,549 lb)

The Ruixiang X5 is a five to seven-seat mid-size crossover SUV produced by Ruixiang, a sub-brand of Yinxiang Group and BAIC Motor.

== History ==
In June 2020, declaration information of a crossover SUV called the Wojie TX7 was obtained from the Chinese Ministry of Industry and Information Technology. The same vehicle was actually declared to have belonged to Weichai Motor. Through the updated information, it was understood that Weichai may launch another new brand called WOJIE, with the TX7 being the brand's first new car. One year later in June 2021, declaration information of a crossover SUV called the Ruixiang X5 declared to have belonged to Yinxiang Group surfaced just days after the Ruixiang brand reveal. The Yinxiang Group later revealed that the company name is now Ruixiang.

== Powertrain ==
The Ruixiang X5 is powered by a 1.5 liter inline-four turbo engine producing 115 kW (154 hp), with the engine mated to either a six-speed manual gearbox or a six-speed automatic gearbox.

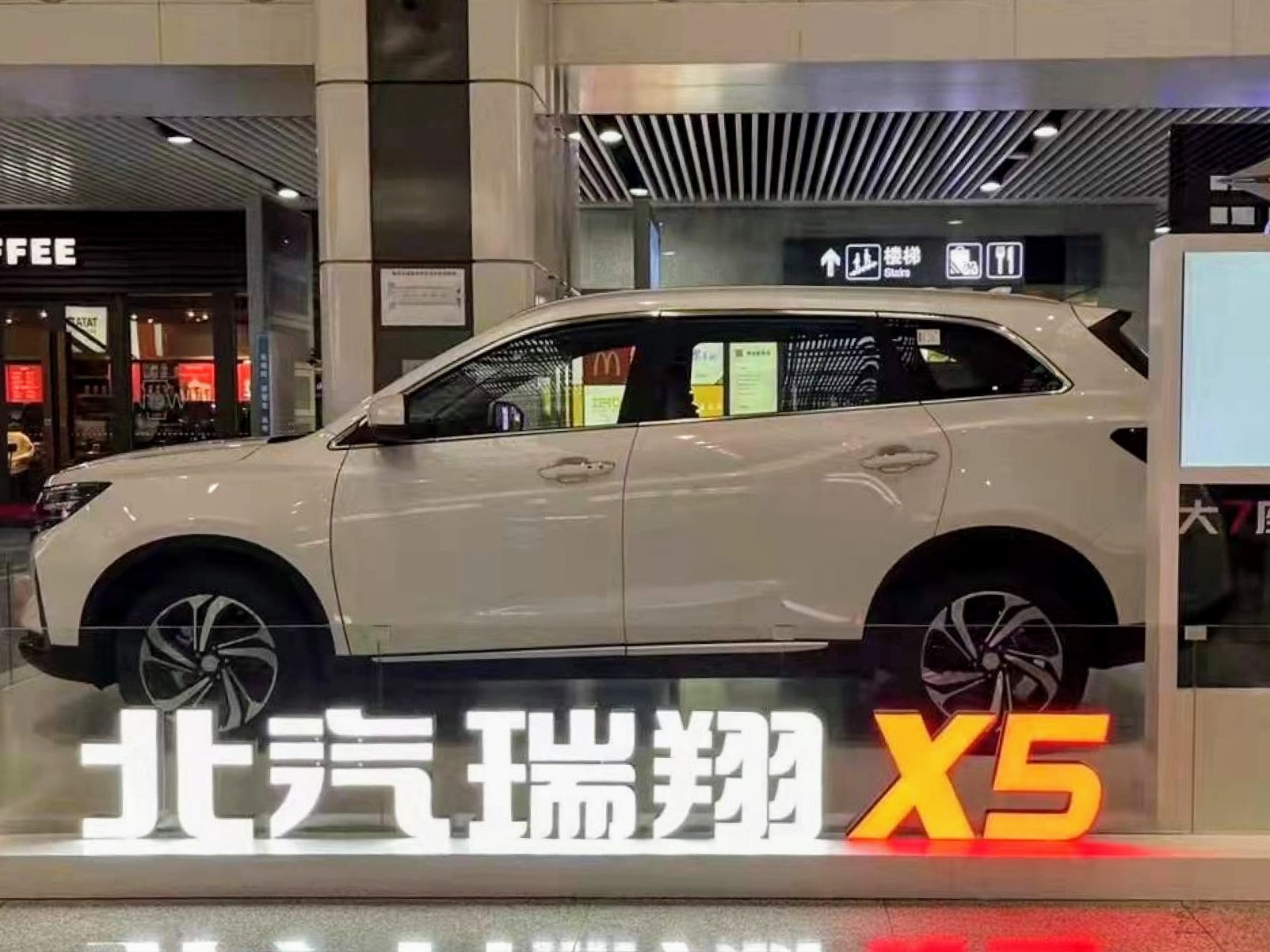
Ruixiang X5 (side)

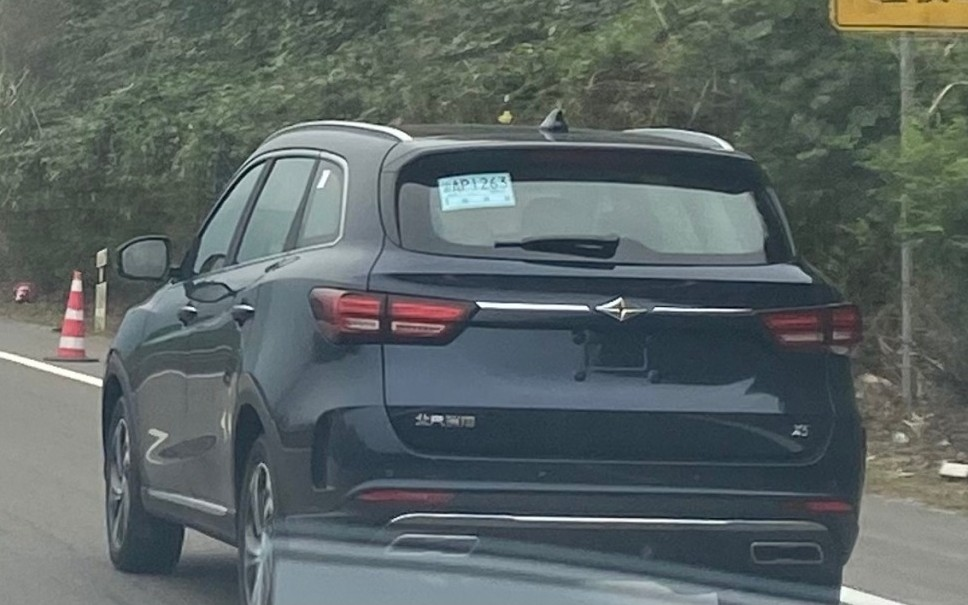
Ruixiang X5 (rear)
