= Traum SEEK5 =

Chinese midsize crossover SUV

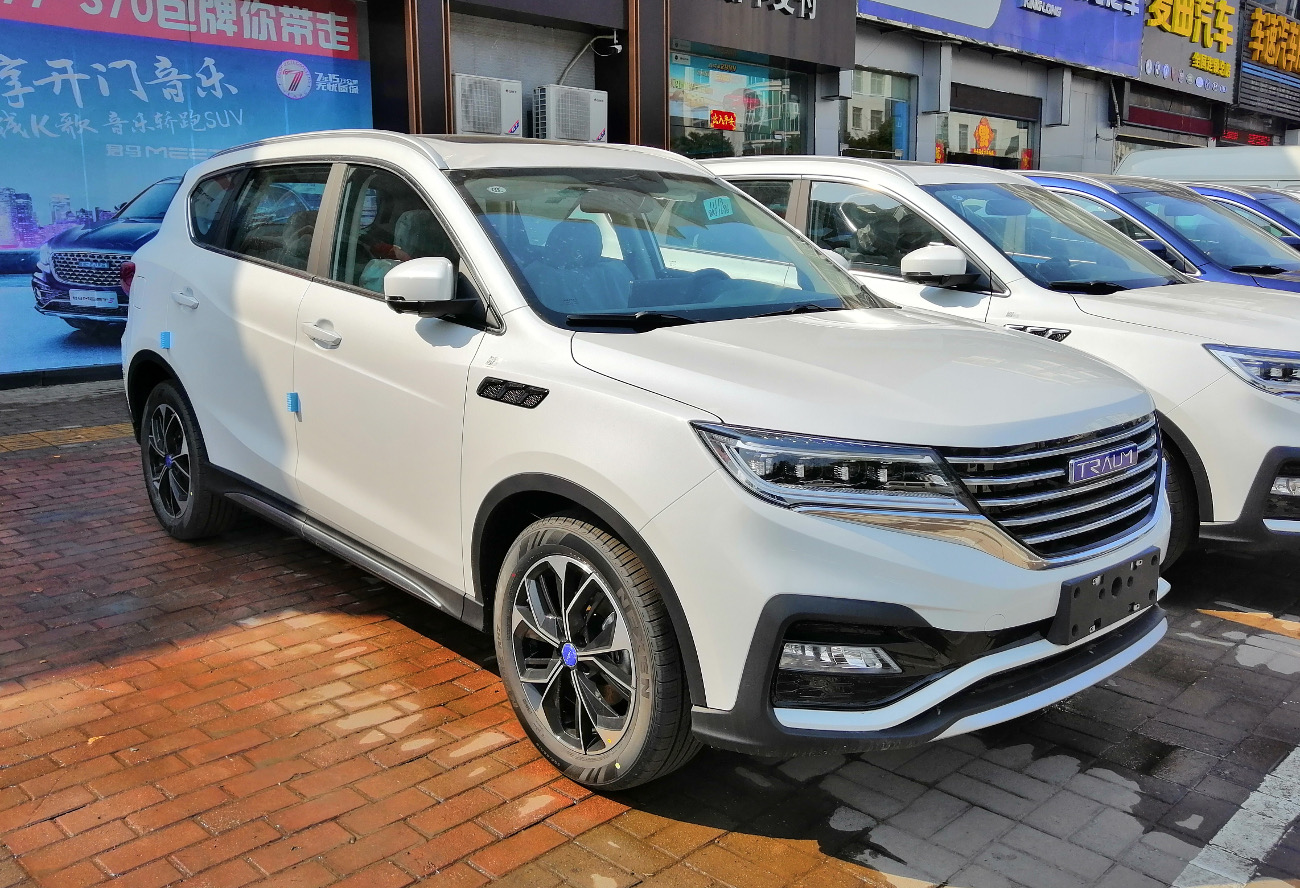
- Traum SEEK5

Overview
- Manufacturer: Traum (Jiangnan Auto)
- Also called: Traum MEET5
- Production: 2018–2021
- Model years: 2018–2021
- Assembly: Jiangxi, China
- Designer: Benedek Tóth

Body and chassis
- Class: mid-size CUV
- Body style: 5-door wagon
- Layout: Front-engine, front-wheel-drive
- Related: Ruixiang X5

Powertrain
- Engine: 1.5 L turbo I4 (gasoline); 2.0 L turbo I4 (gasoline
- Transmission: 5 speed manual 6 speed Automatic

Dimensions
- Wheelbase: 2,800 mm (110.2 in)
- Length: 4,771 mm (187.8 in)
- Width: 1,859 mm (73.2 in)
- Height: 1,706 mm (67.2 in)

The Traum SEEK5 is a midsize crossover SUV produced by Zotye Auto under the Traum sub-brand for the Chinese market.

Formerly known as the Traum D50 during development phase, the production car debuted in summer 2018 as the SEEK5. The Traum Seek5 is the third product of the Traum brand, following the MEET3 compact crossover and the Traum D70 midsize crossover.

== Specification ==
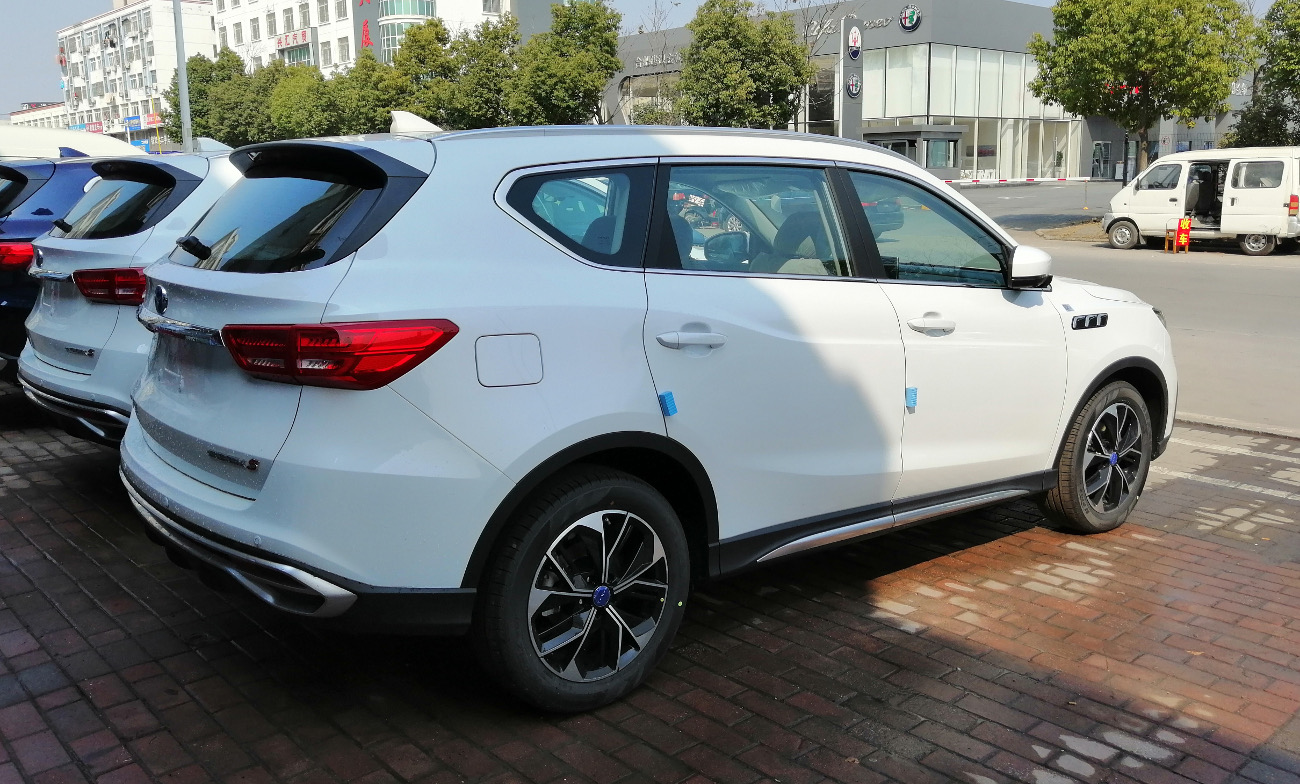
Traum SEEK5 rear

The Seek5 was built on the same platform as the D70 sharing the same wheelbase of 2800 mm and both vehicles are seven-seat crossover SUVs. The SEEK5 is powered by the same engines shared with the D70, a 116 hp 1.6-liter engine and a 139 hp 1.5-liter turbo engine. As of August 2019, a 1.8-liter atmospheric engine option was added.

The SEEK5 is equipped with the engine-start button, emergency braking, electronic parking brakes, heated and ventilation electric adjustable driver and front passenger seats, standard heated side mirrors, surround cameras, 18-inch alloy wheels and a voice activated multimedia system.

The interior of the SEEK5 features a fully digital 12.3-inch high-definition liquid crystal instrument panel that indicates fuel level, vehicle speed and other information. A 10.25-inch touch screen display is also positioned in the center for the infotainment system integrated with the intelligent gesture system, the touch screen adapts to the navigation system and hand gesture controls can be used for making calls or to play music. The system is also compatible with Apple CarPlay and Android Auto. MirrorLink, rear view camera, all-round viewing system and WiFi is also built=in.

== PHEV ==
The TRAUM SEEK 5 is also available as a plug-in hybrid electric vehicle (PHEV) version which is equipped with a lithium-ion battery capable of delivering a range of 80 km (50 miles) rated by NEDC.
