= Traum S70 =

Chinese midsize crossover SUV

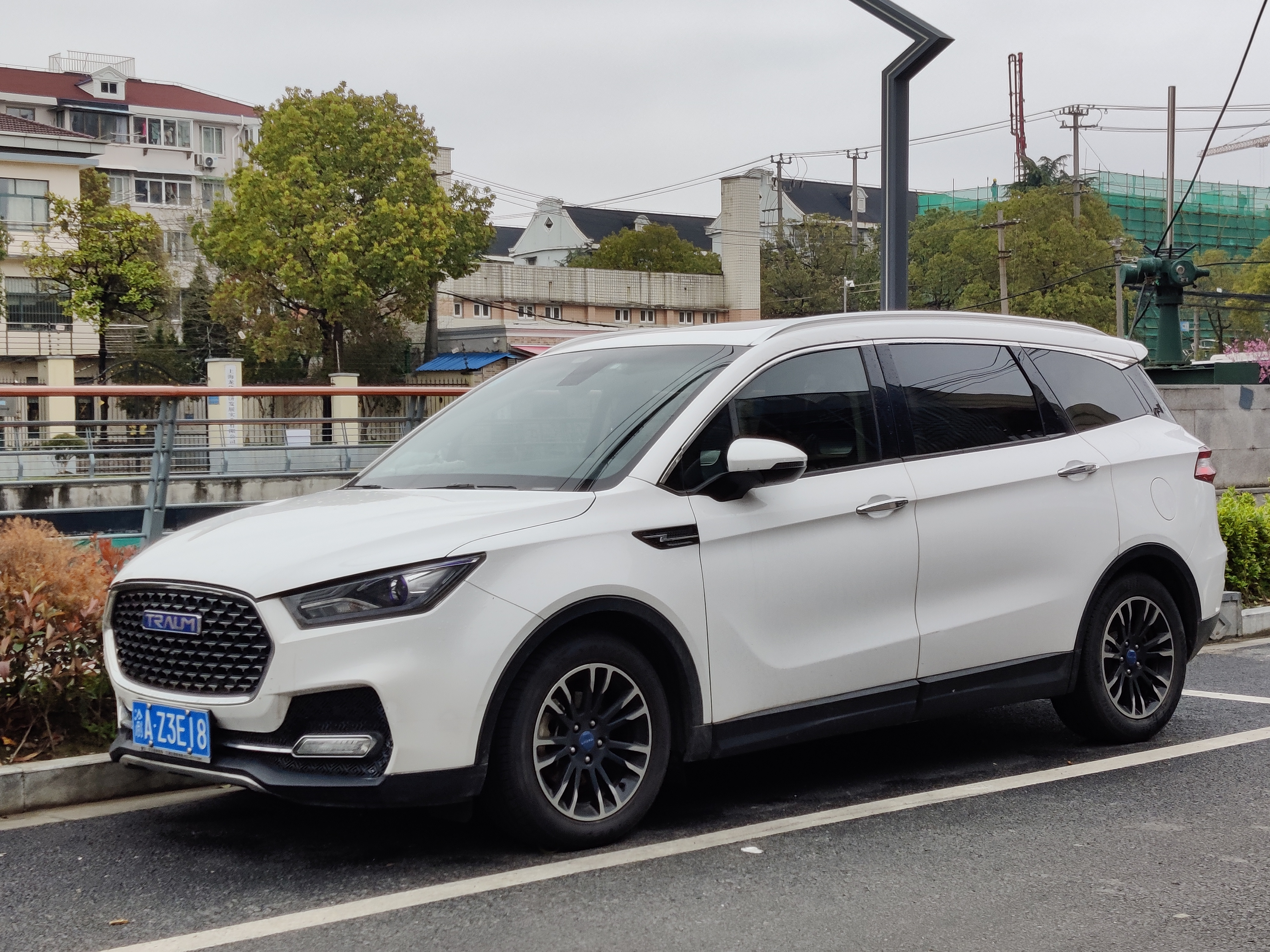
- Traum S70

Overview
- Manufacturer: Traum (Jiangnan Auto)
- Production: 2017–2021
- Model years: 2018–2021
- Assembly: Jiangxi, China

Body and chassis
- Class: mid-size CUV
- Body style: 5-door wagon
- Layout: Front-engine, front-wheel-drive

Powertrain
- Engine: 1.5 L turbo I4 (gasoline); 2.0 L turbo I4 (gasoline)
- Transmission: 5 speed manual 6 speed Automatic

Dimensions
- Wheelbase: 2,800 mm (110.2 in)
- Length: 4,746 mm (186.9 in)
- Width: 1,882 mm (74.1 in)
- Height: 1,700 mm (66.9 in)

The Traum S70 is a mid-size crossover utility vehicle (CUV) produced by the Chinese manufacturer Traum from 2017 to 2021.

== Overview ==
Launched in 2017 for the 2018 model year, the price range of the Traum S70 at launch starts from 81,900 yuan and ends at 115,900 yuan. The Traum-branded vehicles are manufactured by Jiangnan Auto, a subsidiary of Zotye.

=== Powertrain ===
Two engines are available including a 1.5L turbo engine producing 156 hp, and a 1.6L engine producing 116 hp. Two gearboxes are also available including a 5 speed manual gearbox, and a 6 speed automatic gearbox.

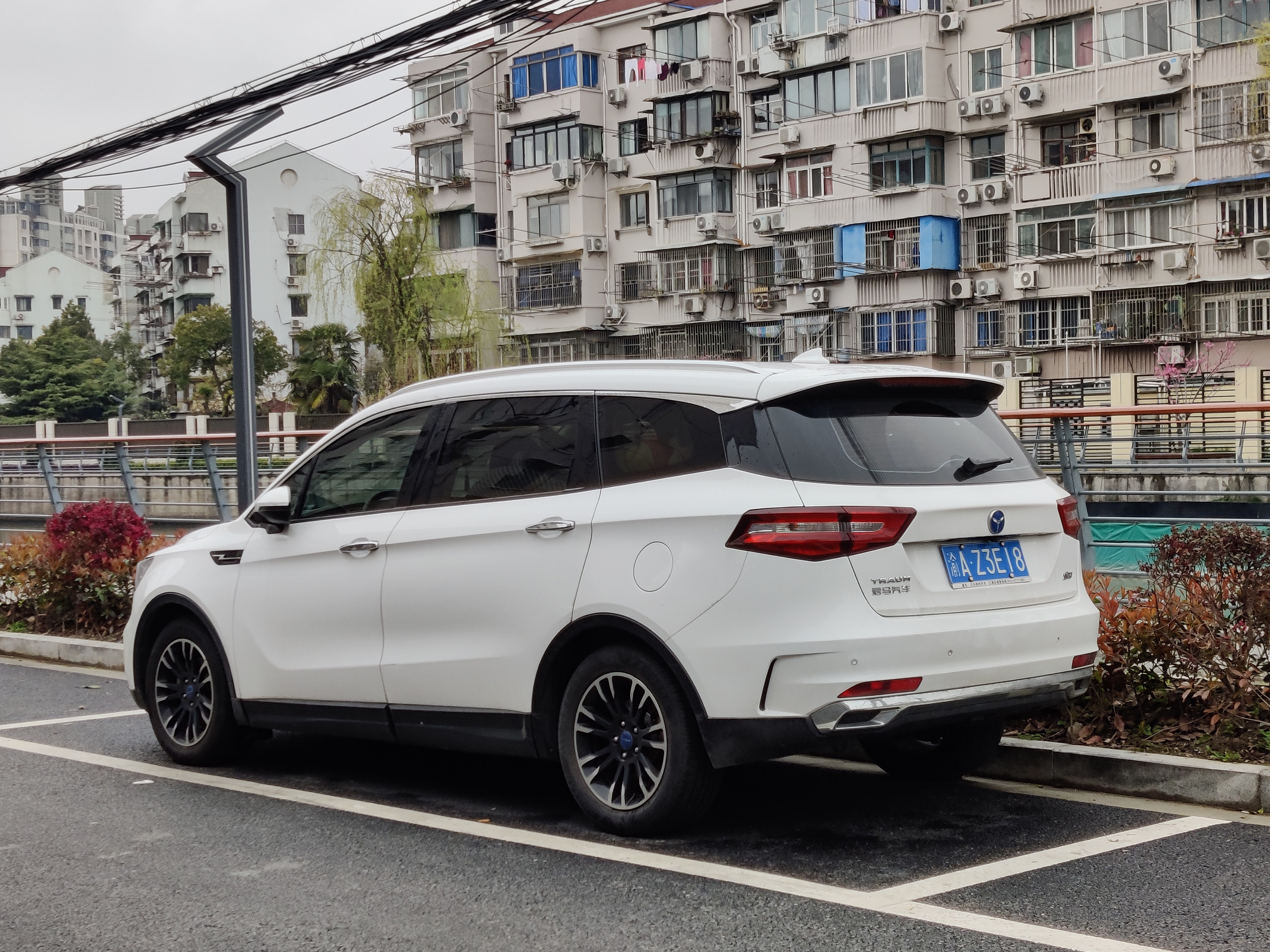
Rear view
