= Zotye SR7 =

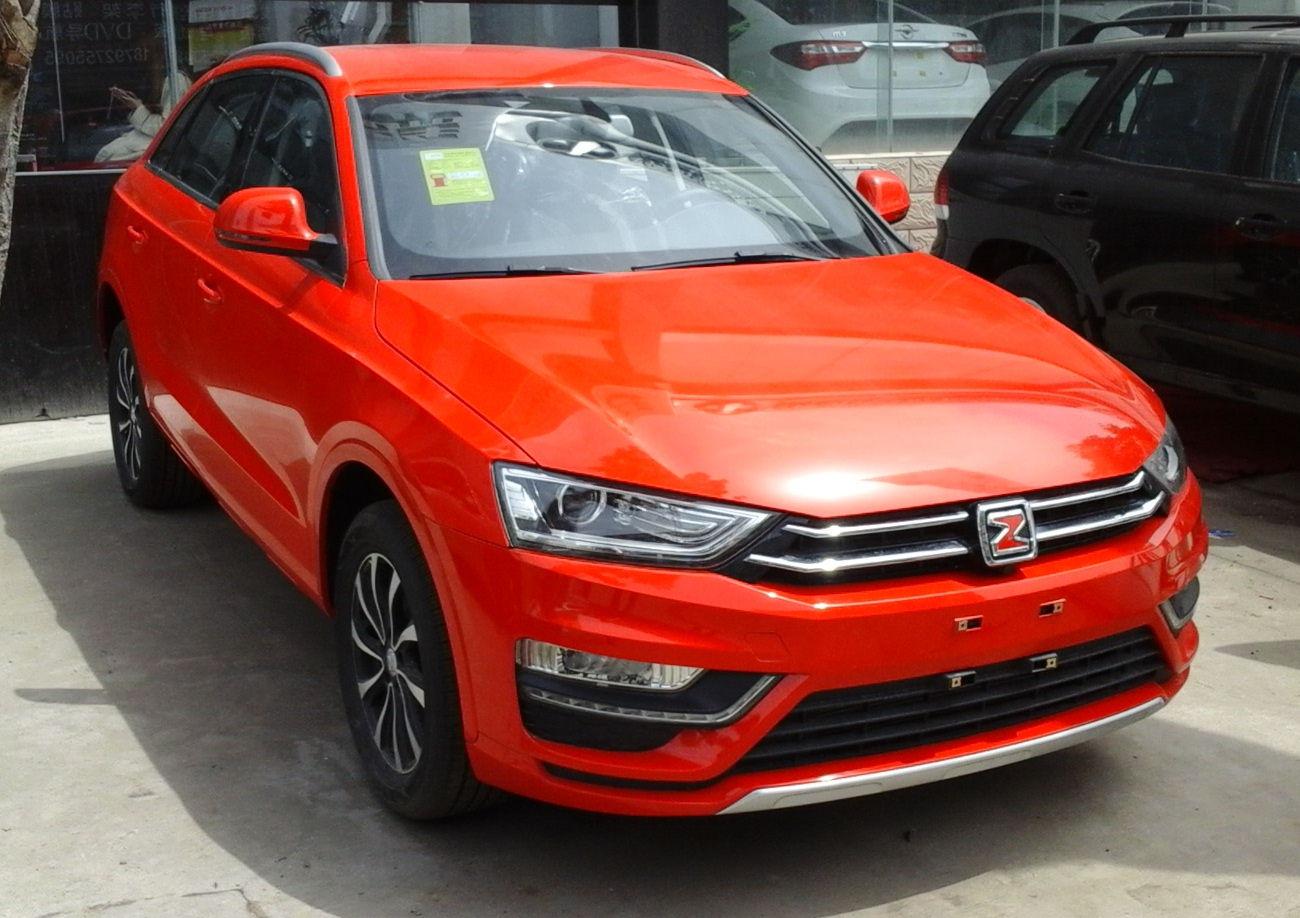

Overview
- Manufacturer: Zotye
- Production: 2015–2021
- Assembly: China

Body and chassis
- Class: Compact crossover SUV
- Body style: 5-door SUV
- Layout: Front-engine, front-wheel-drive
- Related: Traum Meet3

Powertrain
- Engine: 1.5 L 4A91 turbo I4 (petrol)
- Transmission: 5 speed manual CVT

Dimensions
- Wheelbase: 2,680 mm (105.5 in)
- Length: 4,510 mm (177.6 in)
- Width: 1,835 mm (72.2 in)
- Height: 1,610 mm (63.4 in)

The Zotye SR7 was a compact crossover SUV produced by Zotye Auto for the Chinese market.

== Overview ==
The production car debuted on the 2015 Guangzhou Auto Show. It was officially launched on the Chinese car market in late December 2015, pricing starts around 66,800 yuan. The SR7 is a controversial vehicle in terms of styling, because it moderately resembles the Audi Q3 and a Volkswagen-style front end, making it one of the unlicensed copy of a Audi SUV. The Zotye SR7 is the first product of the Zotye S-series crossovers. According to Zotye, "SR" stands for “Sixth Revolutions”.

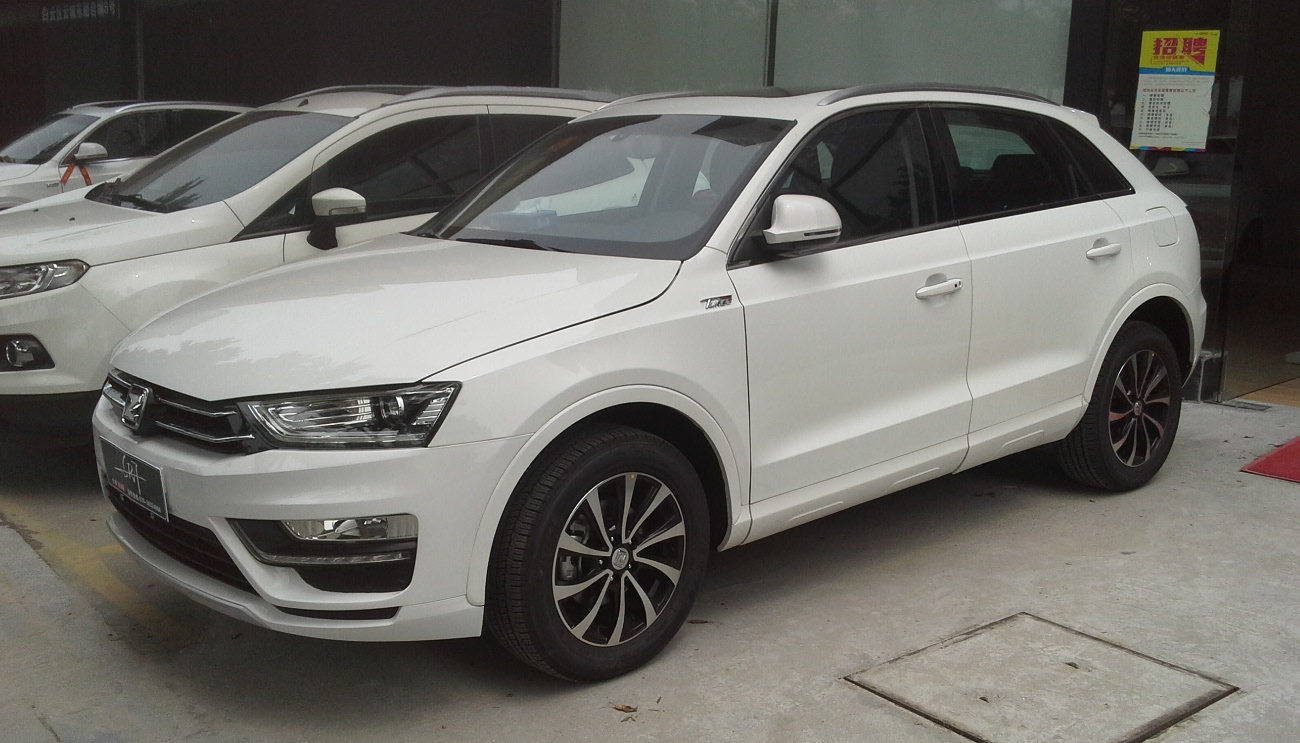
Zotye SR7 front

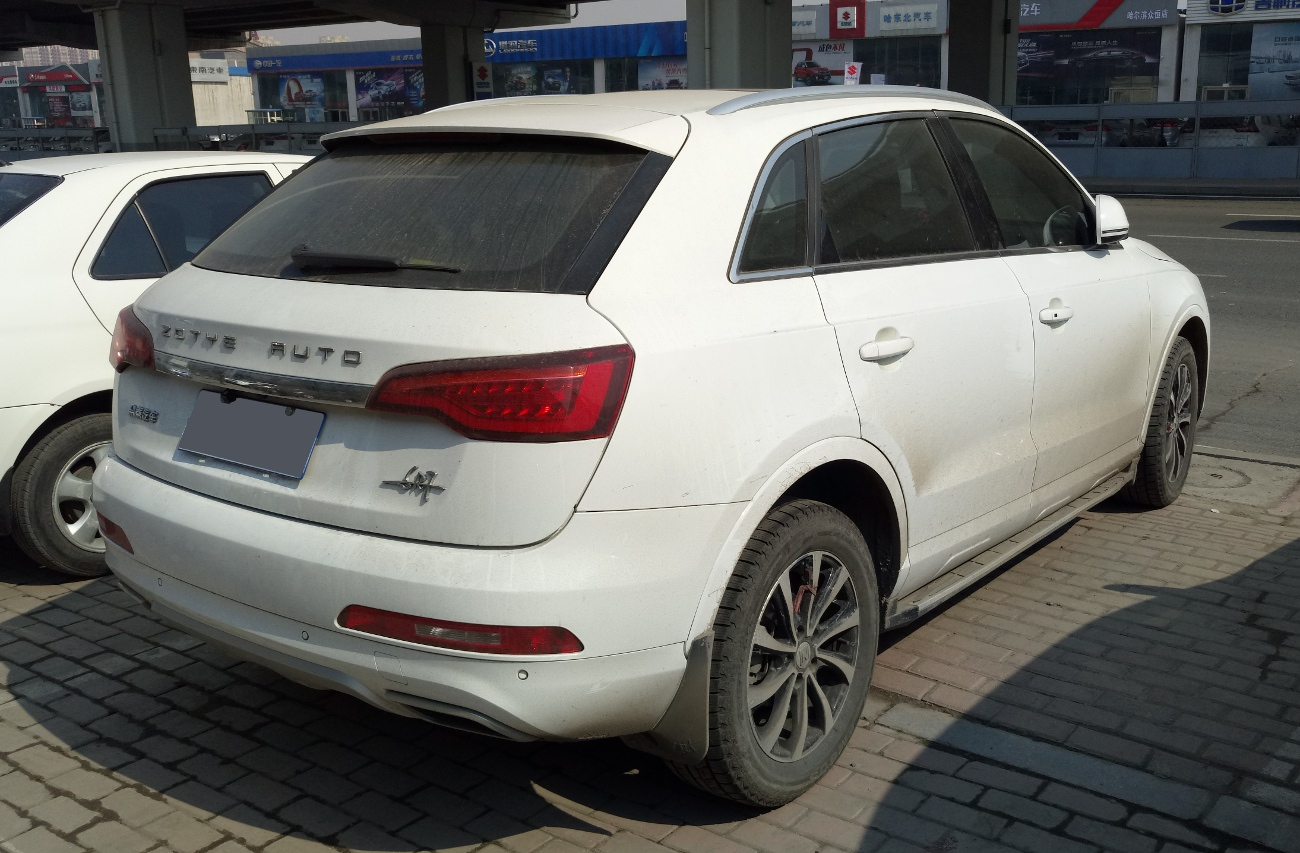
Zotye SR7 rear
