= Yusheng (disambiguation) =

Yusheng is a Cantonese-style raw fish salad.

Yusheng may also refer to:

== Automobiles ==
- BAW Yusheng, a 2010–present Chinese compact SUV
- JMC Yusheng, a Chinese sub-brand of vehicles by JMC
  - Yusheng S350, a 2010–present Chinese mid-size SUV, formerly called JMC Yusheng before 2016

== People ==
- Chang Yu-sheng (1966–1997), Taiwanese singer
- Yusheng Ji, Japanese electrical engineer
- Liang Yusheng (1924–2009), pen name of Chinese writer Chen Wentong
