= Ford Territory =

Ford Territory is a name used by Ford on the following SUVs:

- Ford Territory (Australia), an SUV produced by Ford Australia in 2004–2016
- Ford Territory (China), an SUV produced by JMC-Ford in China since 2018
