= Yusheng S330 =

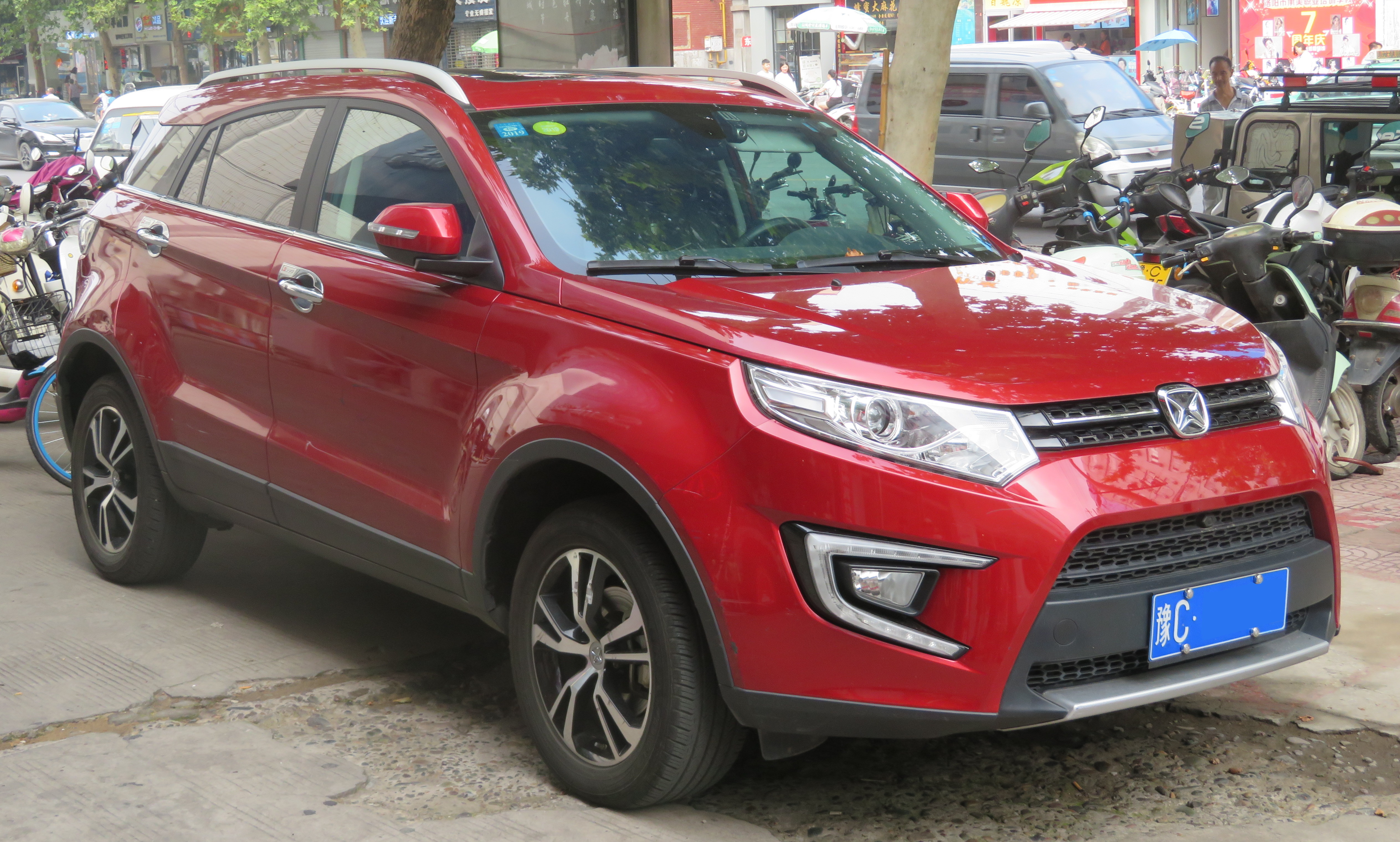
- JMC Yusheng S330 facelift

Overview
- Manufacturer: JMC Yusheng
- Production: 2016–2018
- Model years: 2017–2018
- Designer: Carlos Arroyo Turon, Denis Zhuravlev (showcar)

Body and chassis
- Class: Compact crossover SUV
- Body style: 5-door SUV
- Layout: Front-engine, front-wheel-drive or four-wheel-drive
- Related: Ford Territory (China)

Powertrain
- Engine: 1.5 L JX4G15A5L turbo I4; 1.5 L JX4G15B5L turbo I4
- Transmission: 6-speed manual 6-speed automatic

Dimensions
- Wheelbase: 2,712 mm (106.8 in)
- Length: 4,588 mm (180.6 in)
- Width: 1,932 mm (76.1 in)
- Height: 1,676 mm (66.0 in)

The Yusheng S330 is a compact crossover SUV produced by JMC Yusheng and positioned below the Yusheng S350 SUV.

== Overview ==
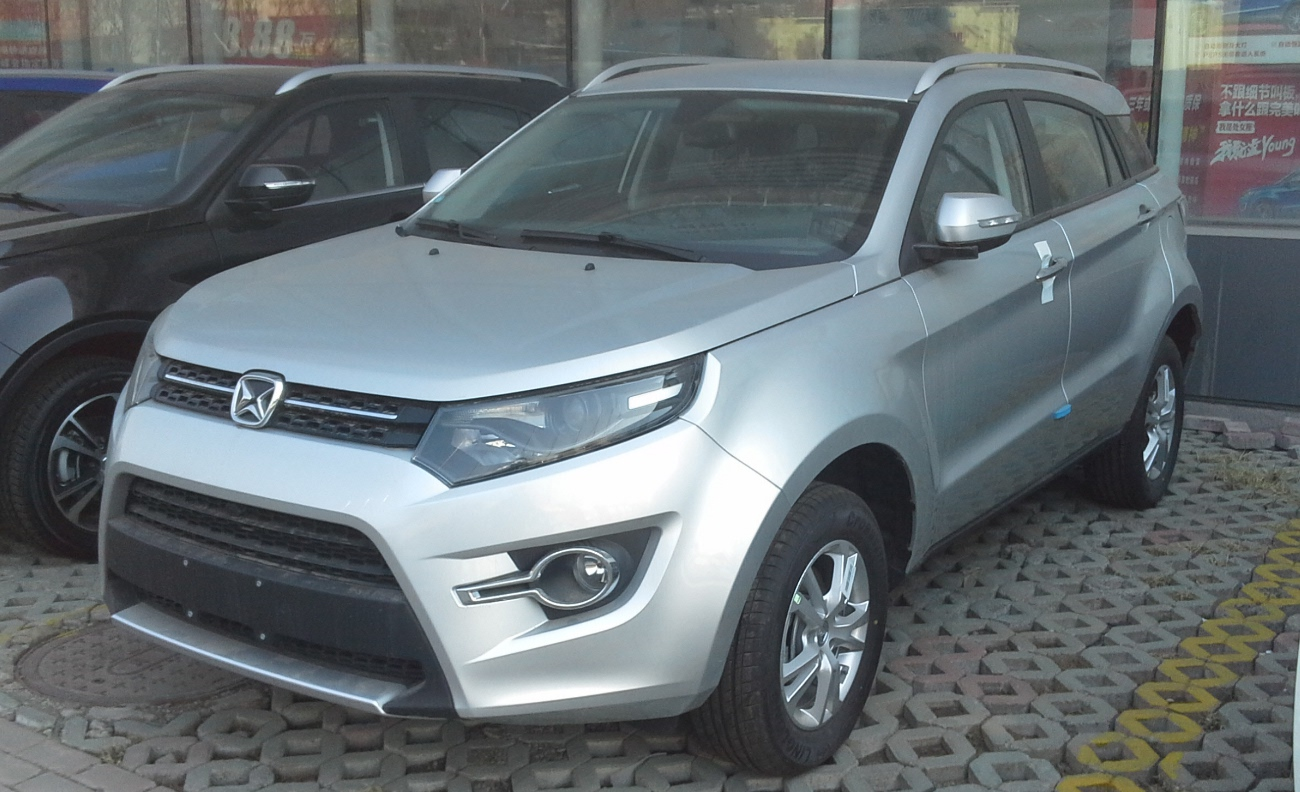
Yusheng S330 pre-facelift

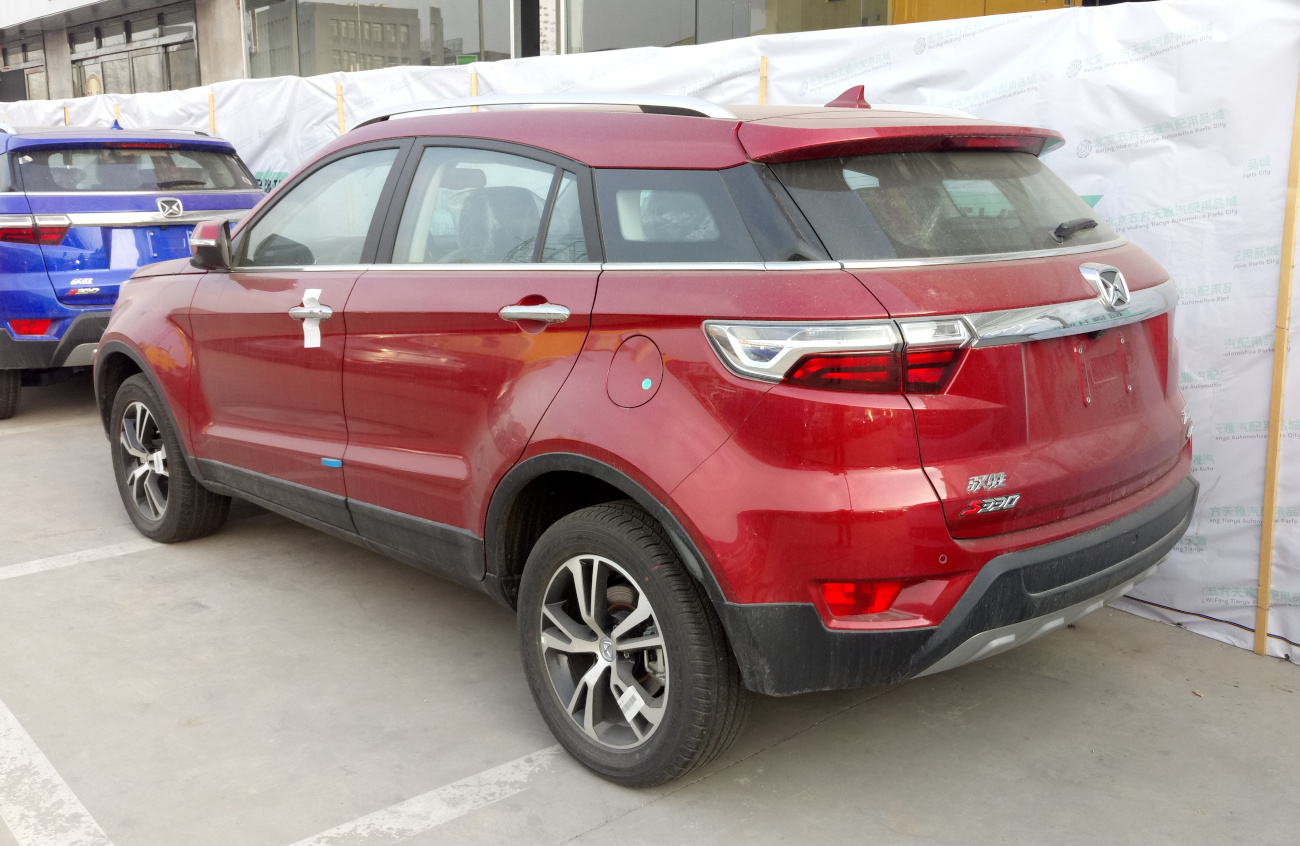
Rear view (facelift model)

The Yusheng S330 compact crossover SUV is a joint-venture between JMC and Ford. Its research & development, design, and manufacturing allegedly complies with Ford's global standards. The S330 made its debut at the 2016 Beijing Auto Show and was launched on the Chinese car market in the second half of the 2016. The S330 is the production version of the Yusheng S330 concept which was revealed during the 2015 Shanghai Auto Show.

=== Engine ===
The Yusheng S330 is powered by 1.5 liter turbocharged inline-4 engines developed by JMC in collaboration with AVL designated as JX4G15A5L and JX4G15B5L for the manual and automatic transmission vehicles respectively. The Engines produces 163hp (120kW) at 5400-5700rpm and 25.5 kg⋅m (250 N⋅m; 184 lb⋅ft) at 1500-3500 rpm, the compact SUV has a top speed of 180km/h.
