= Ford Equator =

Mid-size crossover SUV produced by JMC-Ford

Overview
- Manufacturer: Ford
- Model code: CX756; CX743MCA (Equator Sport)
- Also called: Ford Territory (two-row version, export)
- Production: 2021–present
- Assembly: China: Nanchang (JMC-Ford); Vietnam: Hai Duong (Ford Vietnam; Territory); Taiwan: Zhongli (Ford Lio Ho; Territory)

Body and chassis
- Class: Compact crossover SUV (Equator Sport/Territory); Mid-size crossover SUV (Equator)
- Body style: 5-door SUV
- Layout: Front-engine, front-wheel-drive
- Related: Ford Territory

Powertrain
- Engine: Petrol: 1.5 L EcoBoost 4G15F6C I4 turbo (Equator Sport/Territory); 1.8 L EcoBoost 4G18F6E I4 turbo (Territory; Americas and Middle East); 2.0 L EcoBoost 4G20D6L I4 turbo
- Transmission: 6-speed wet-clutch DCT (Equator); 7-speed wet-clutch DCT (Equator Sport/Territory)

Dimensions
- Wheelbase: 2,865 mm (112.8 in); 2,726 mm (107.3 in) (Equator Sport/Territory)
- Length: 4,905 mm (193.1 in); 4,630 mm (182.3 in) (Equator Sport/Territory)
- Width: 1,930 mm (76.0 in); 1,935 mm (76.2 in) (Equator Sport/Territory)
- Height: 1,755 mm (69.1 in); 1,706 mm (67.2 in) (Equator Sport/Territory)
- Curb weight: 1,750–1,830 kg (3,858–4,034 lb)

The Ford Equator (Chinese: 福特领裕; pinyin: Fútè Lǐngyù) is a mid-size crossover SUV built by the JMC-Ford joint venture.

== Overview ==
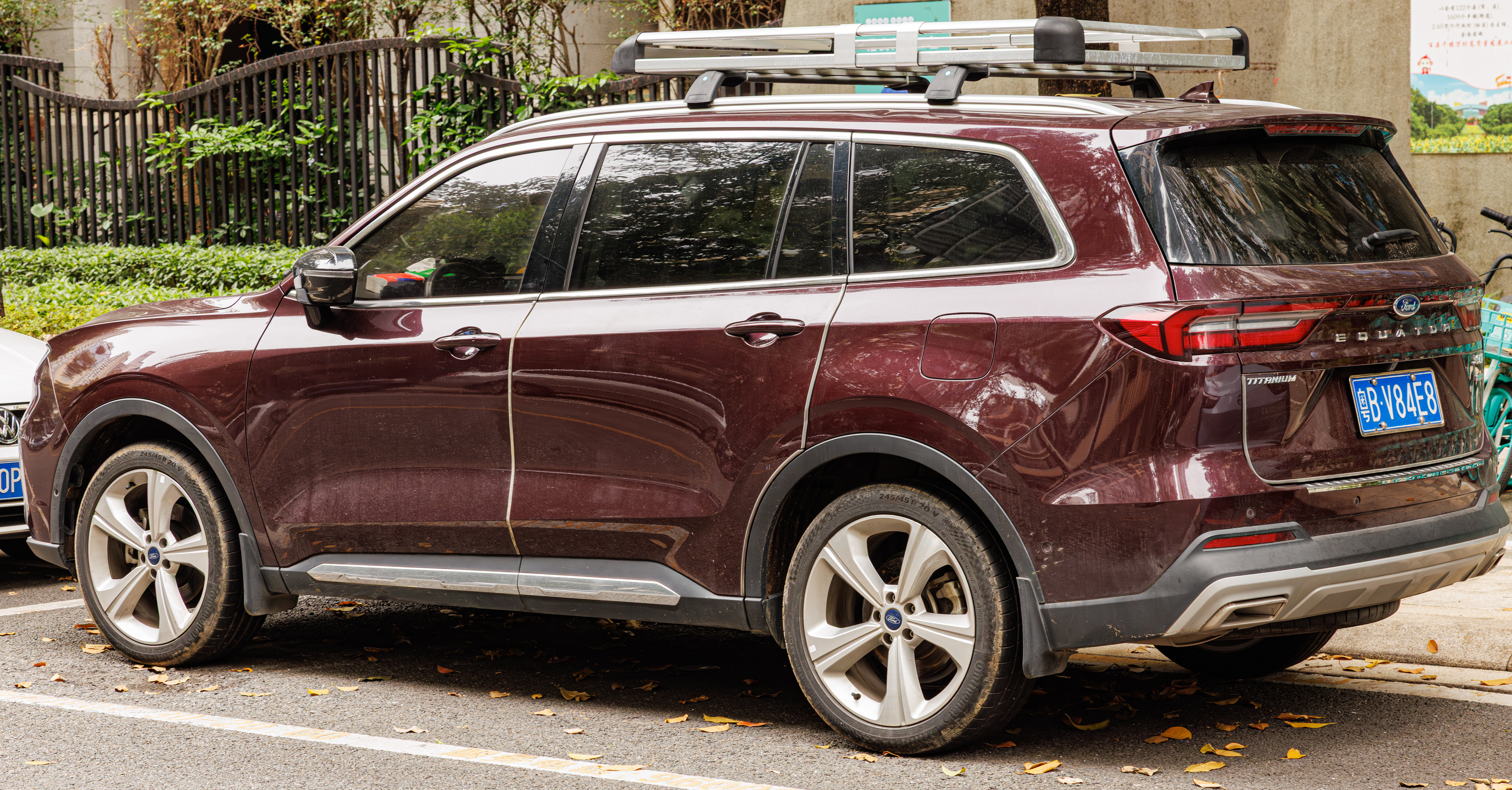
Rear view

The Equator is a three-row SUV that slots directly above the Everest in the JMC-Ford SUV line-up.

The instrumental panel of the Equator is equipped with a pair of 12.3-inch screens used for the digital instrument cluster and infotainment system. The interior of the Equator also feature wooden accents and a rotary gear selector. The infotainment system includes Ford's Co-Pilot360 system and is sold only as a six-seater.

The Equator is powered by a transverse-mounted 2.0-liter turbocharged EcoBoost engine based on the JX4G20 petrol engine developed by JMC and AVL which produces 221 hp (224 PS; 165 kW). Production of the car is planned to start around the first quarter of 2021.

=== Facelift and PHEV ===
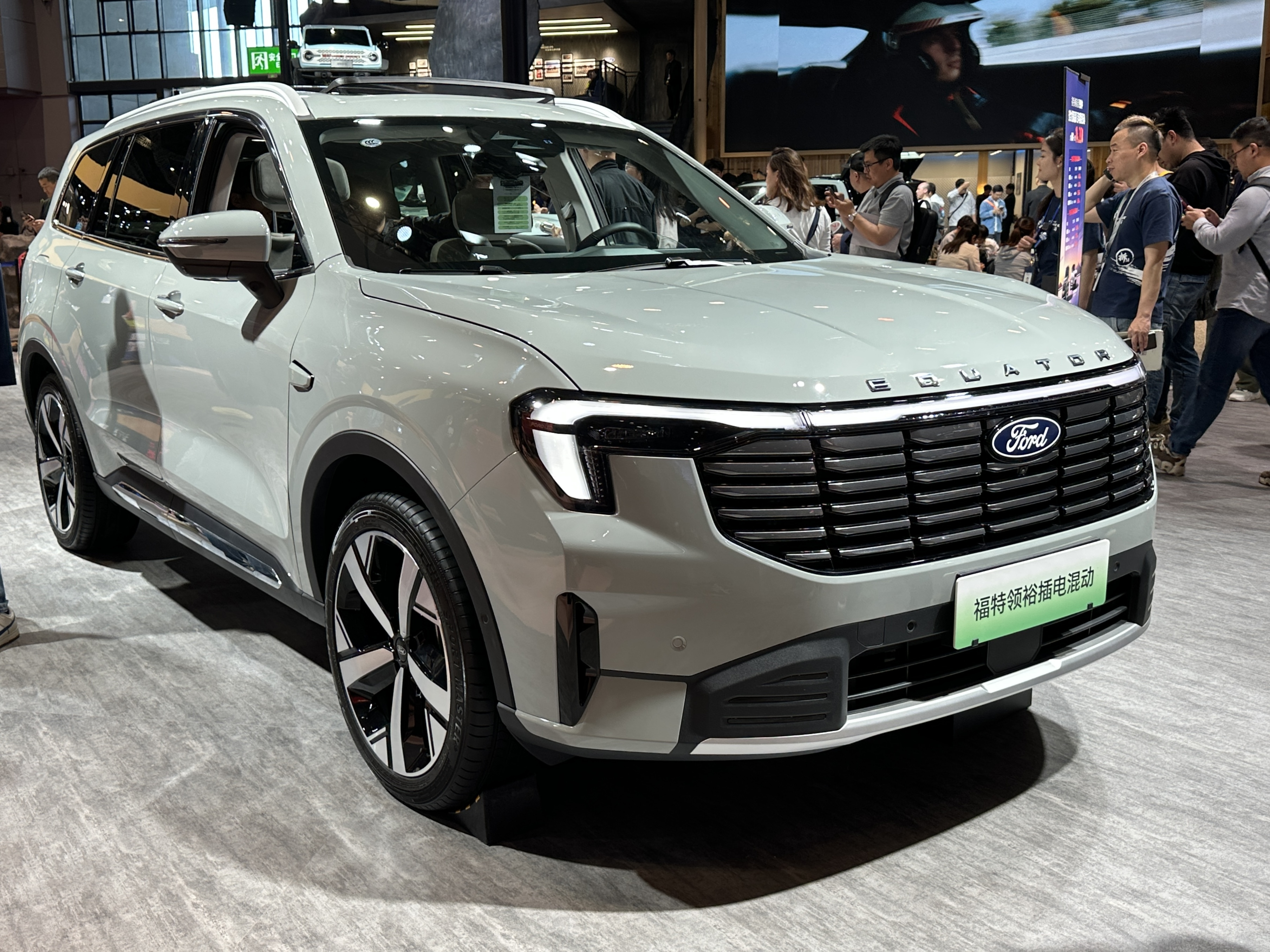
Ford Equator PHEV front

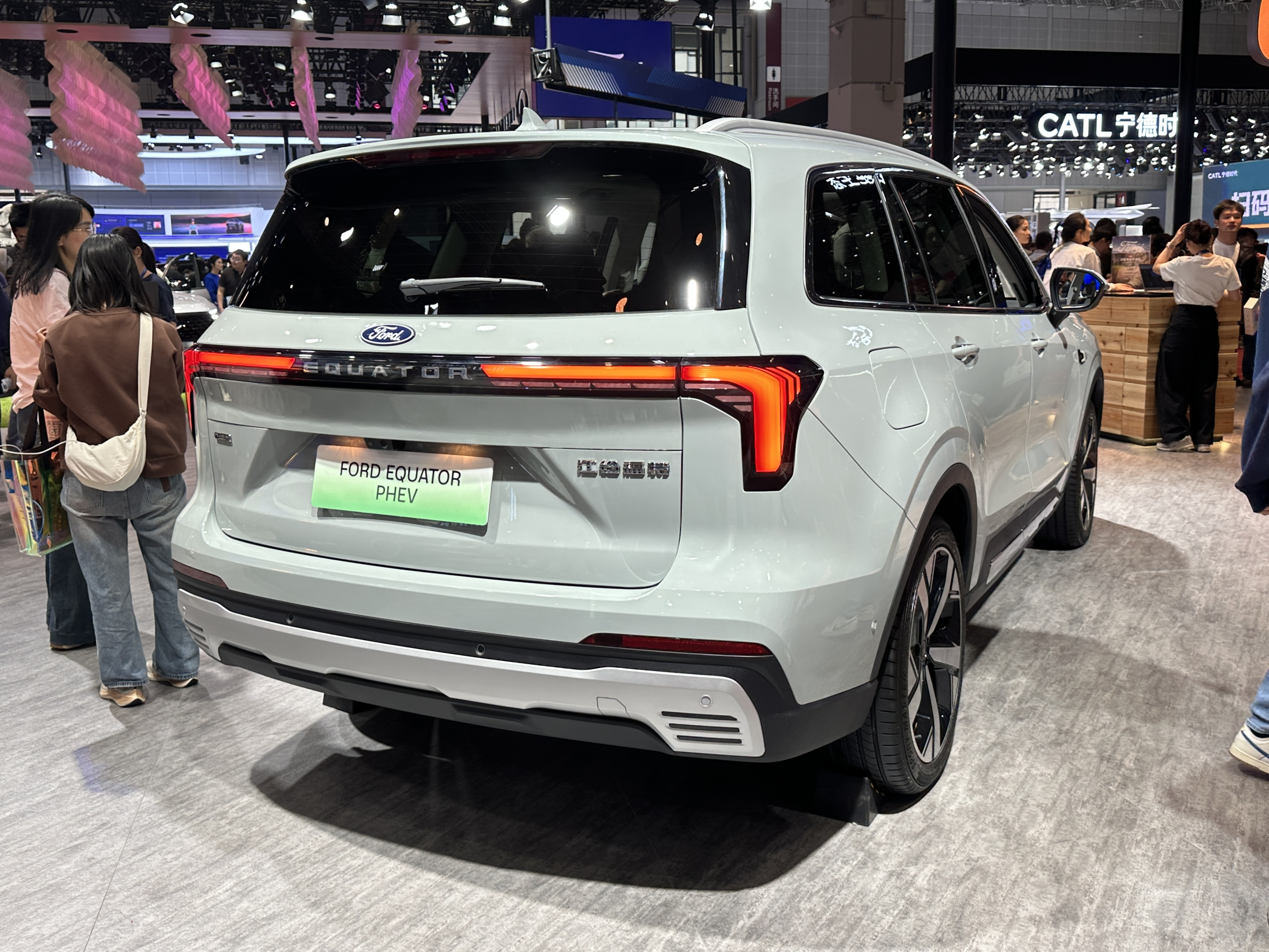
Ford Equator PHEV rear

== Equator Sport/Territory ==
A shorter two-row version of the Equator was revealed at the Guangzhou Auto Show in November 2021 as the Equator Sport (Chinese: 领睿; pinyin: Lǐngruì). It is 140 millimetres (5.5 in) shorter than the three-row Equator, and is powered by an all new 1.5 EcoBoost 4G15F6C engine rated at 125 kW (168 hp) paired to a seven-speed Magna wet dual-clutch transmission. Despite being mechanically unrelated, the Equator Sport has a very similar interior and exterior styling to the Equator. The model is exported to markets outside China as the Ford Territory.

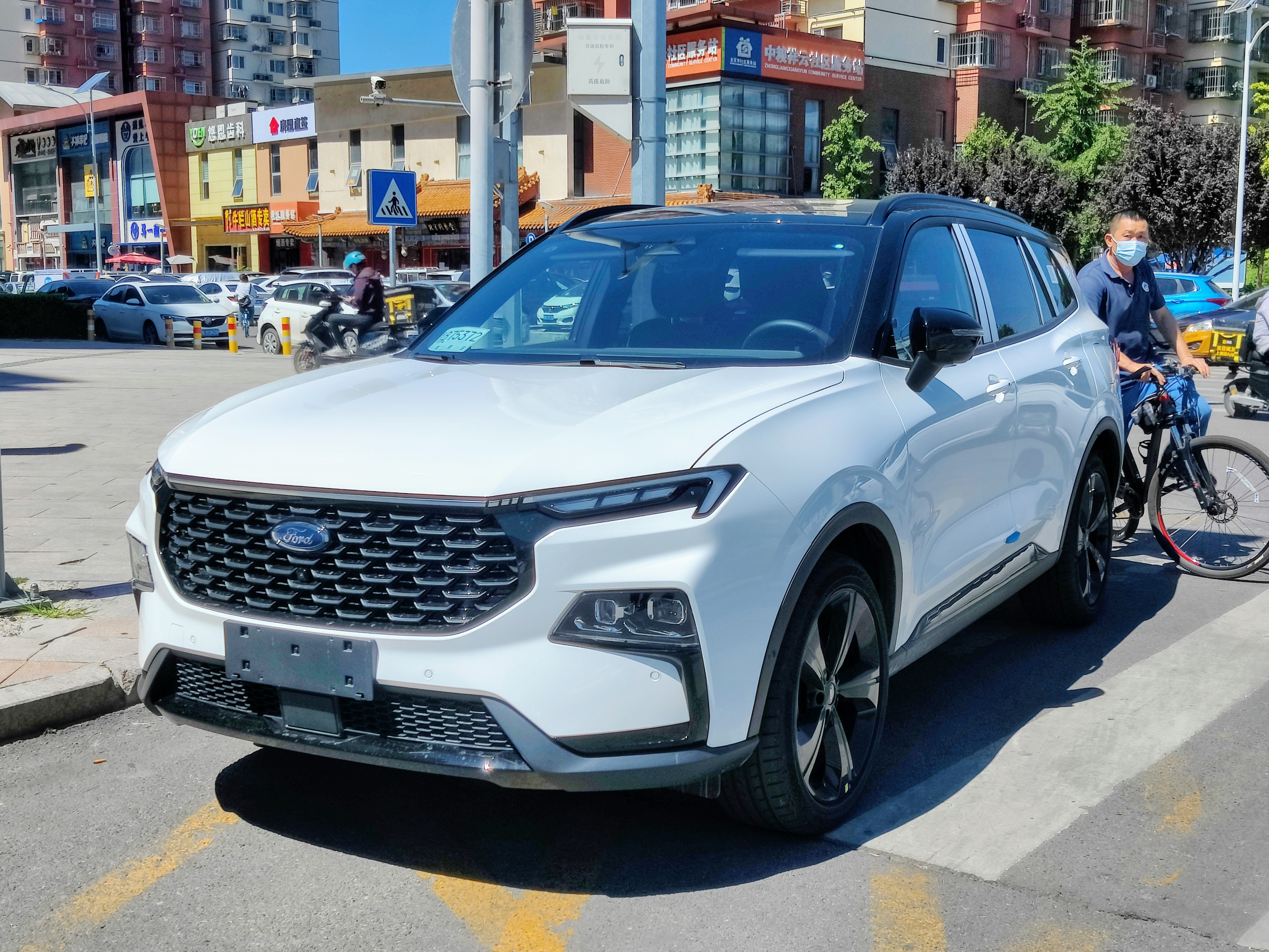
Ford Equator Sport front

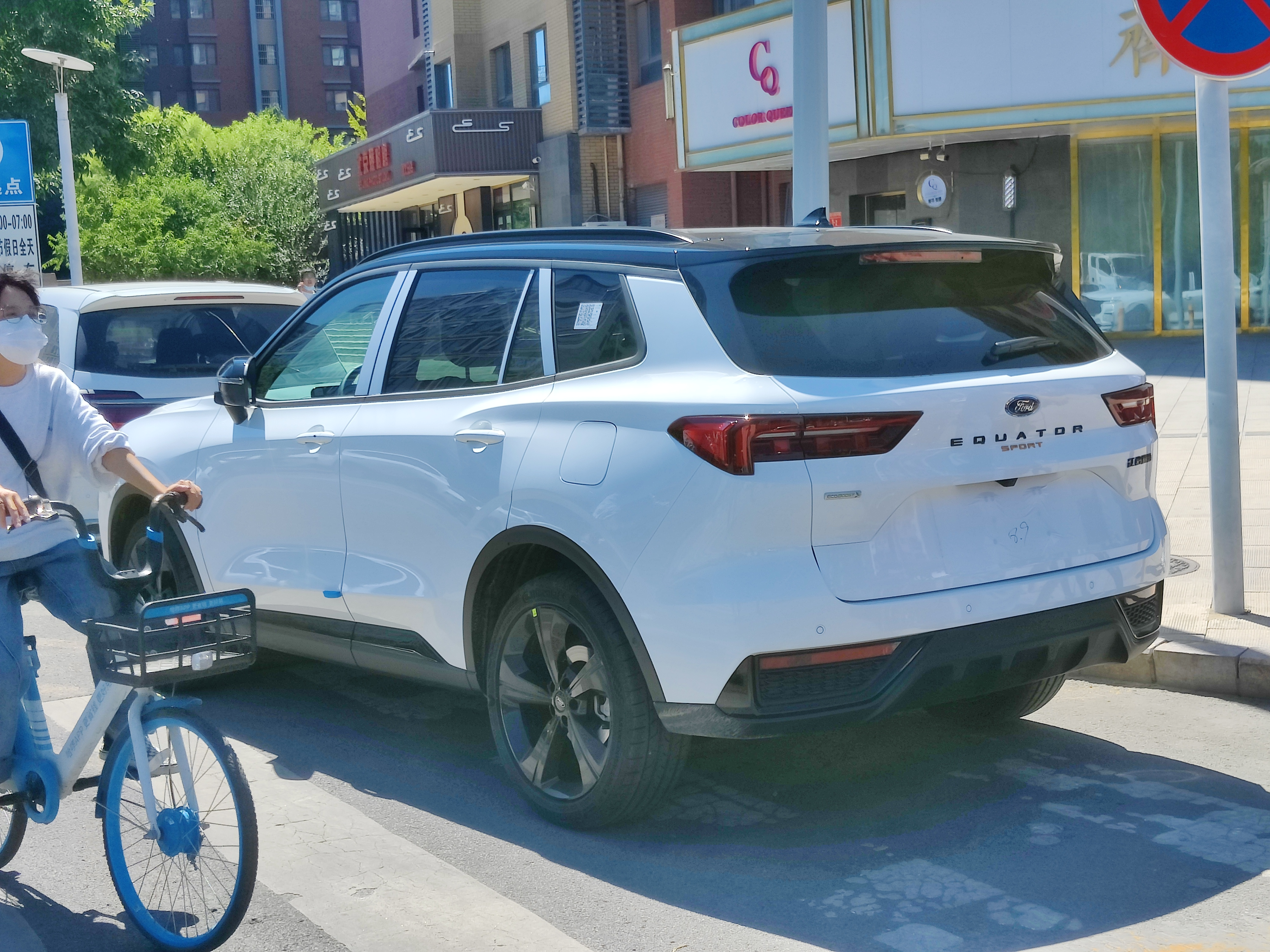
Ford Equator Sport rear

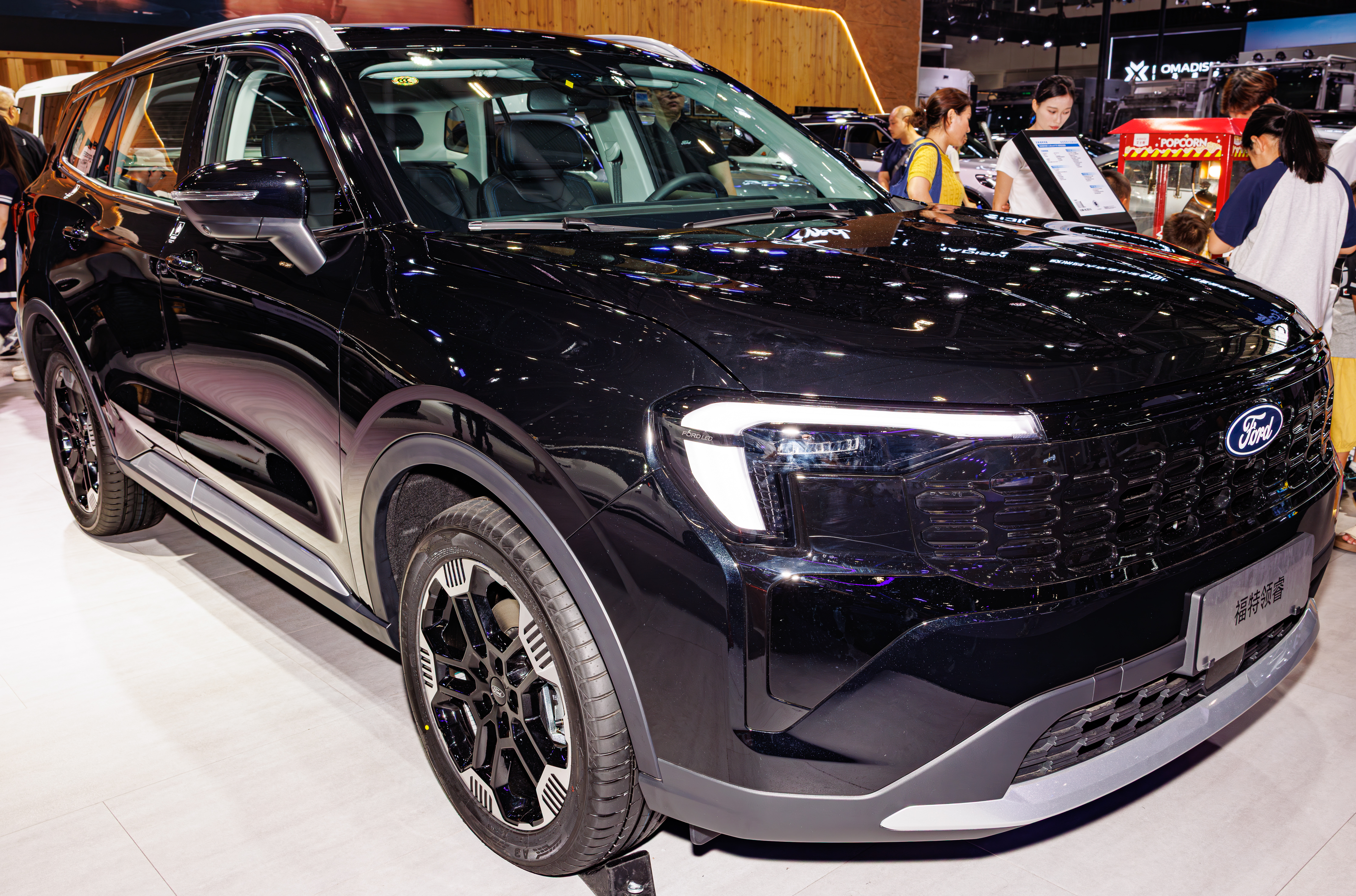
Facelift

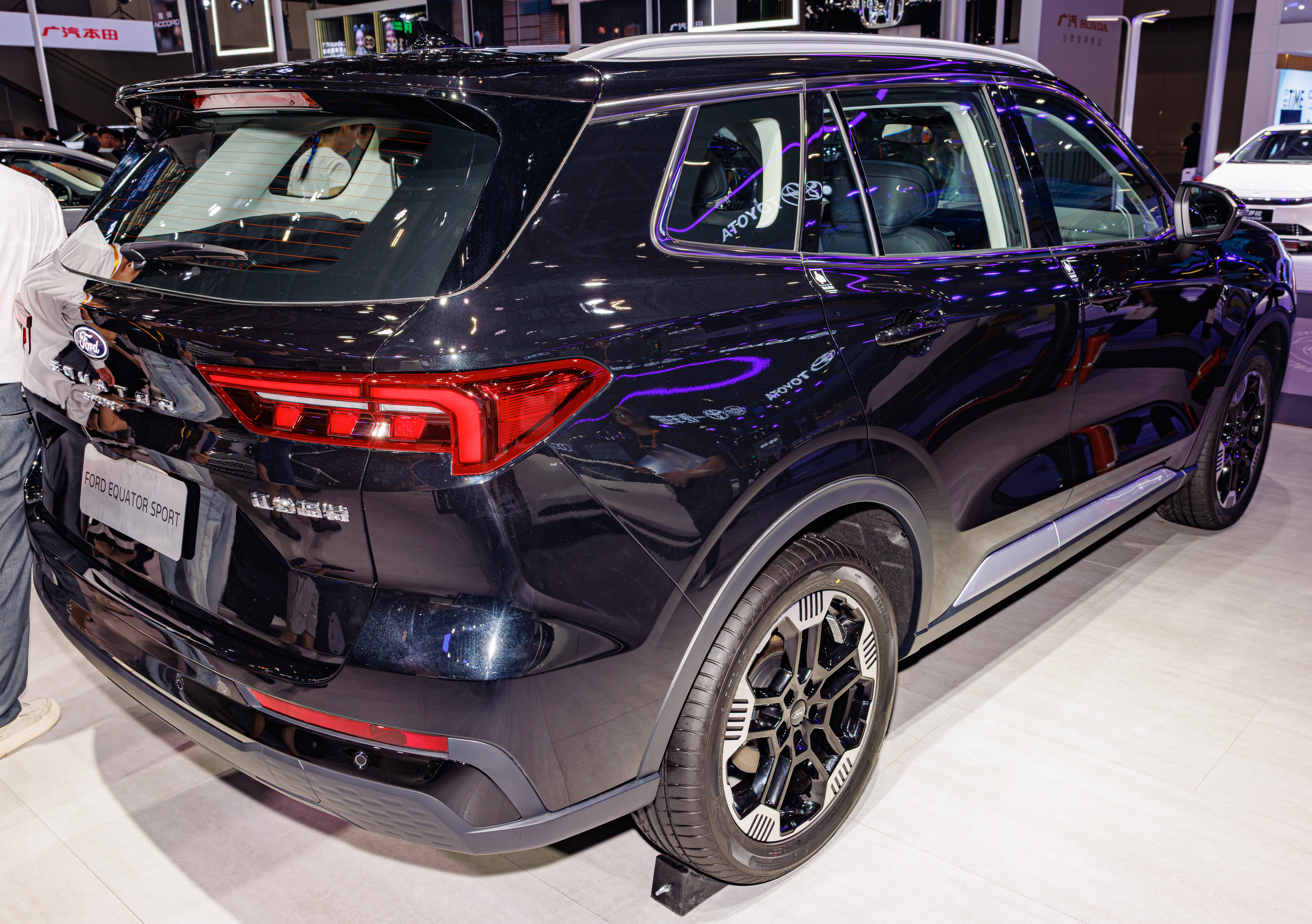
Rear view

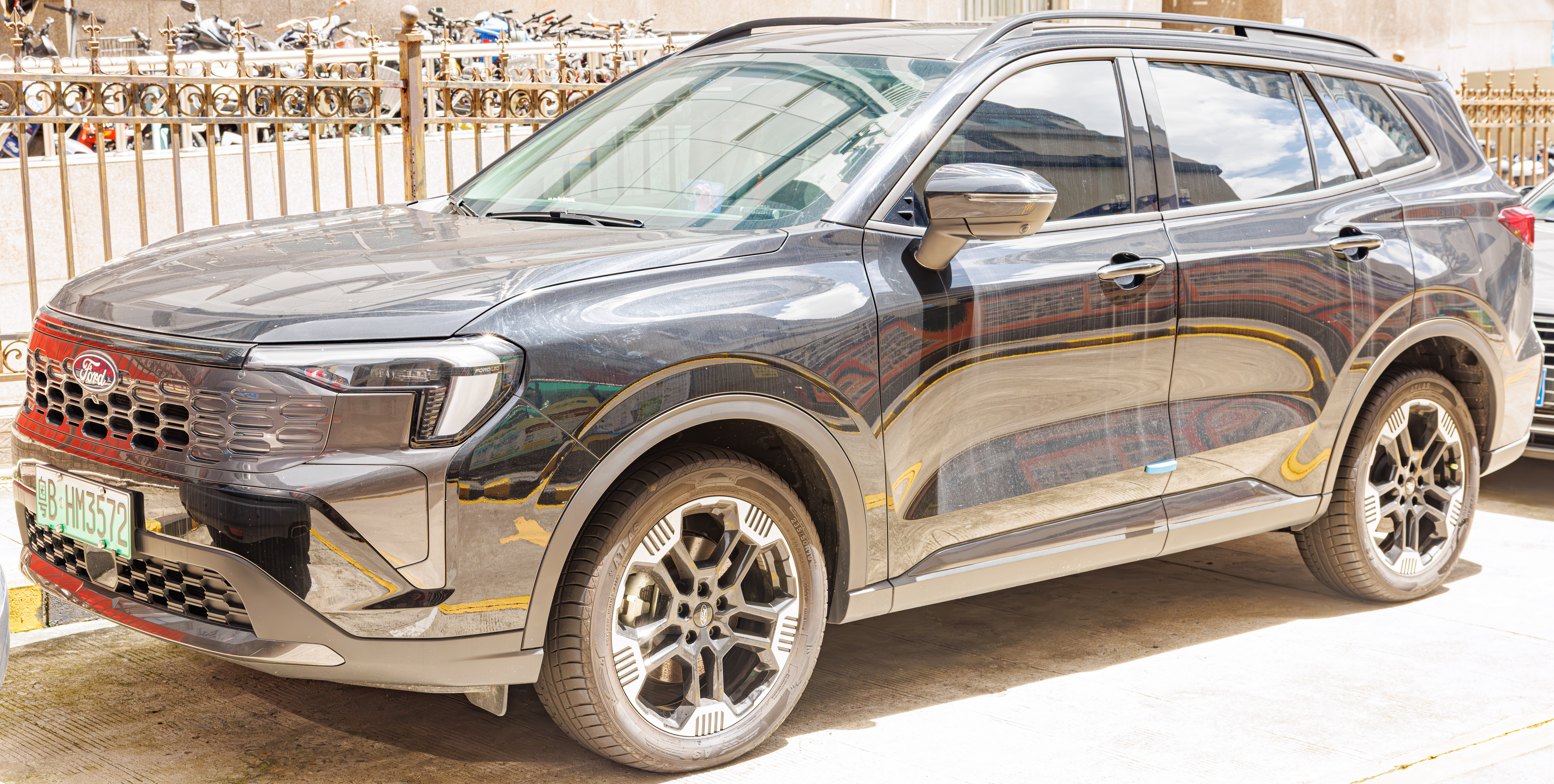
Ford Equator Sport PHEV front

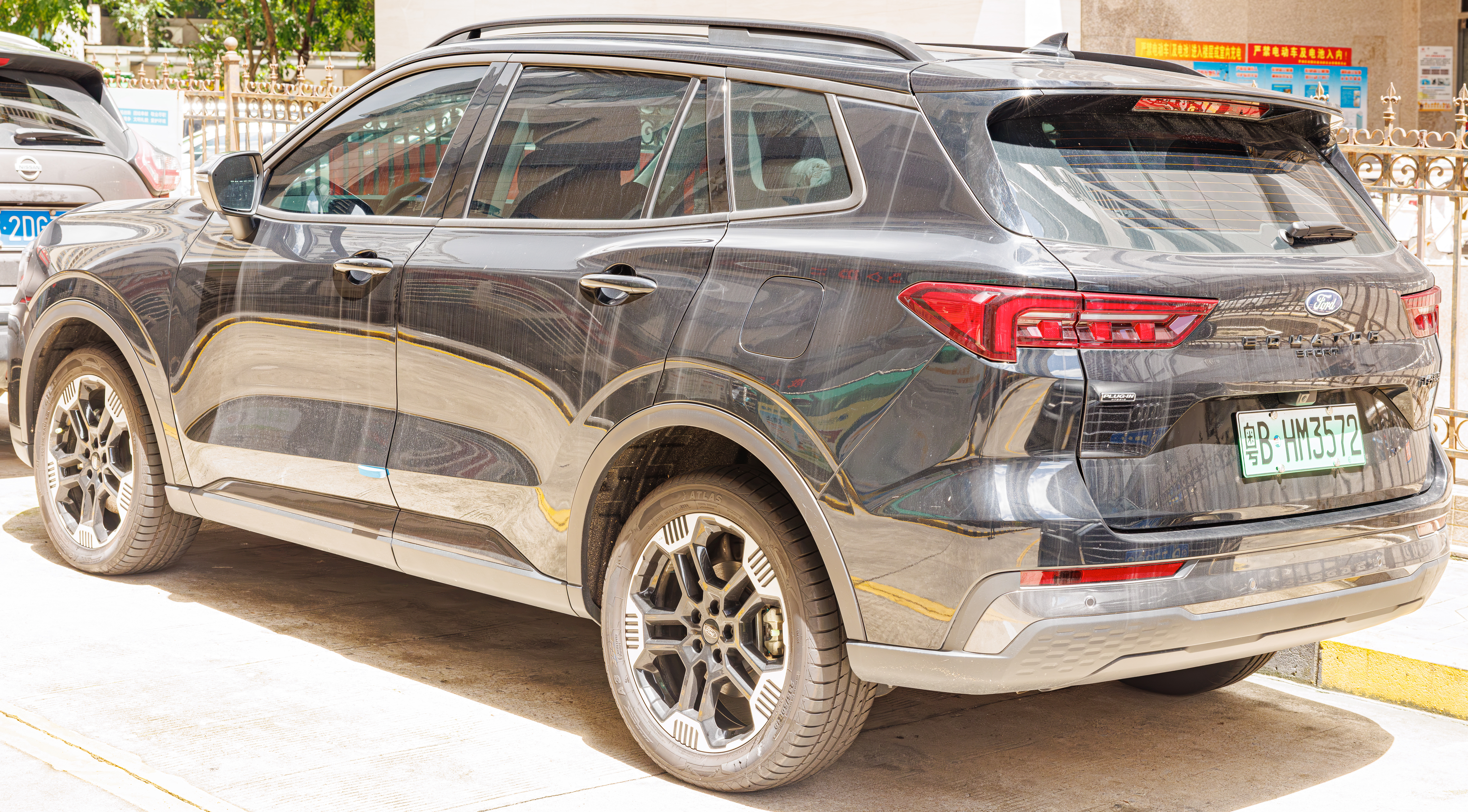
Ford Equator Sport PHEV rear

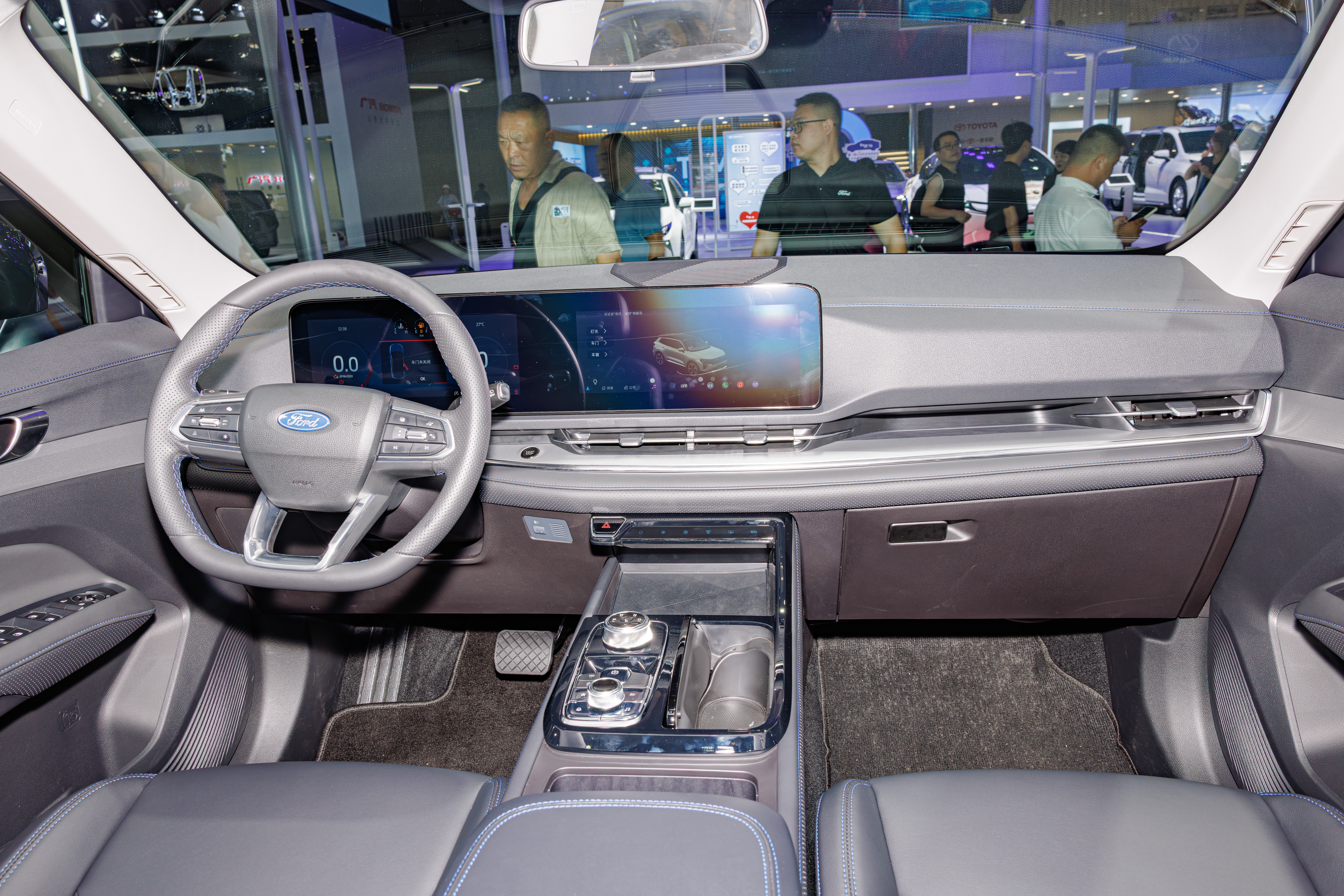
Interior

== Sales ==
=== Equator ===
Year	China		
Year	Equator	PHEV	Total
2021		—	15,590
2022		—	8,663
2023	6,371	—	6,371
2024	3,690	91	3,781
2025	399	1,115	1,514

=== Equator Sport/Territory ===
Year	China			Mexico	Philippines	Saudi Arabia	Vietnam
Year	Sport	PHEV	Total	Mexico	Philippines	Saudi Arabia	Vietnam
2022		—	23,664	2,033		2,457	2,038
2023	25,863	—	25,863	12,313	9,119	12,838	8,096
2024	22,190	180	22,370				
2025	11,532	809	12,341				
