= Ford Territory (China) =

Automobile produced by Ford since 2018

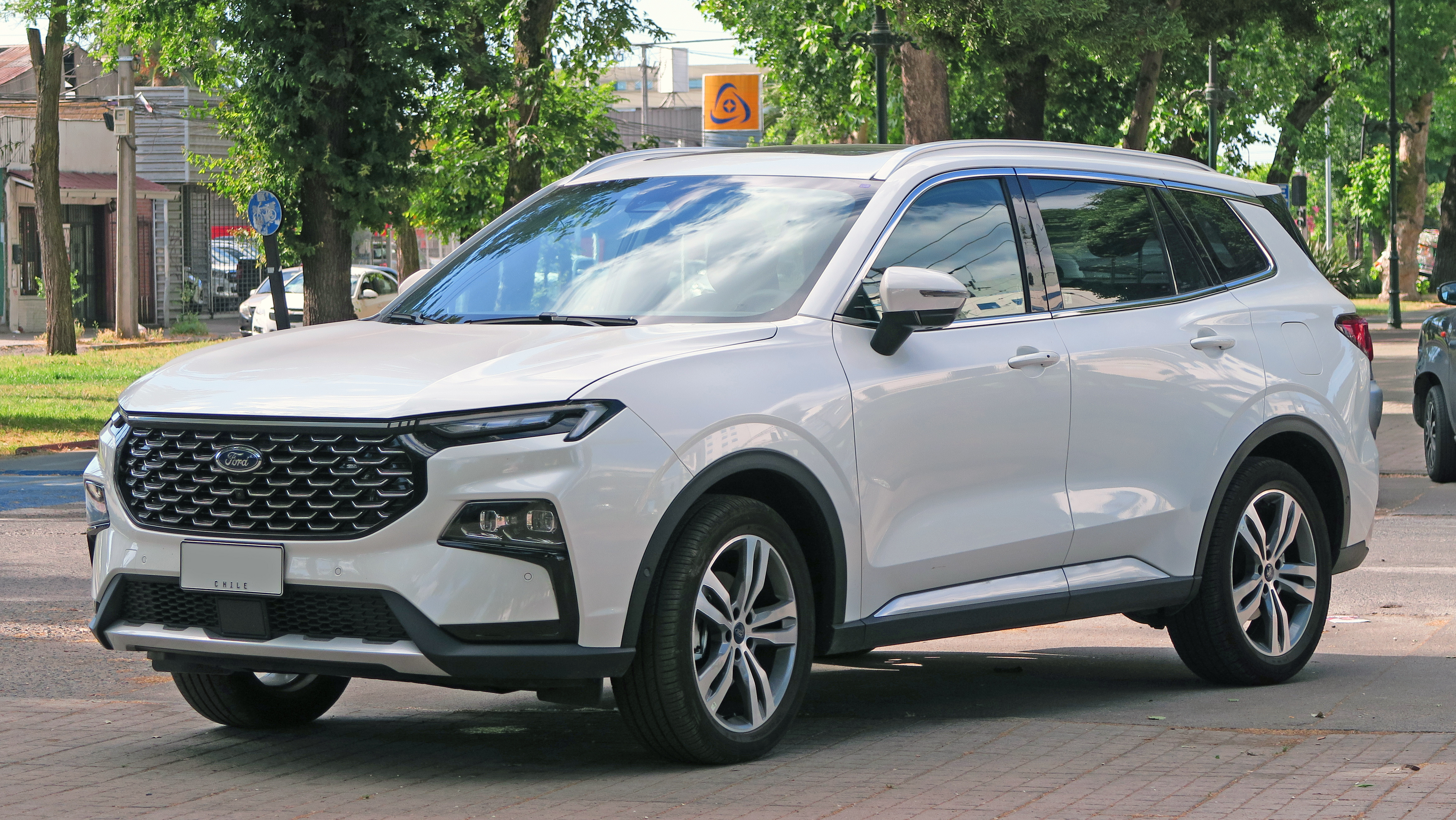

Overview
- Manufacturer: JMC-Ford
- Production: 2018–present

Body and chassis
- Class: Compact crossover SUV
- Body style: 5-door SUV
- Layout: Front-engine, front-wheel-drive

Chronology
- Predecessor: Ford Escape/Kuga (Middle East (excluding Israel), Africa, Latin America, Taiwan, and Southeast Asia (excluding Singapore))

The Ford Territory (Chinese: 福特领界; pinyin: Fútè Lǐngjiè) is a compact SUV produced by Ford through the JMC-Ford joint venture in China since 2018. It inherits the nameplate from the previous Australian market Territory.

The first generation Chinese-built Territory was introduced in China in 2018 as a rebadged and modified Yusheng S330 which is produced by Ford partner JMC.

In 2022, JMC-Ford launched the Equator Sport, which is exported as the new generation Territory.

== First generation (CX743; 2018) ==
First generation
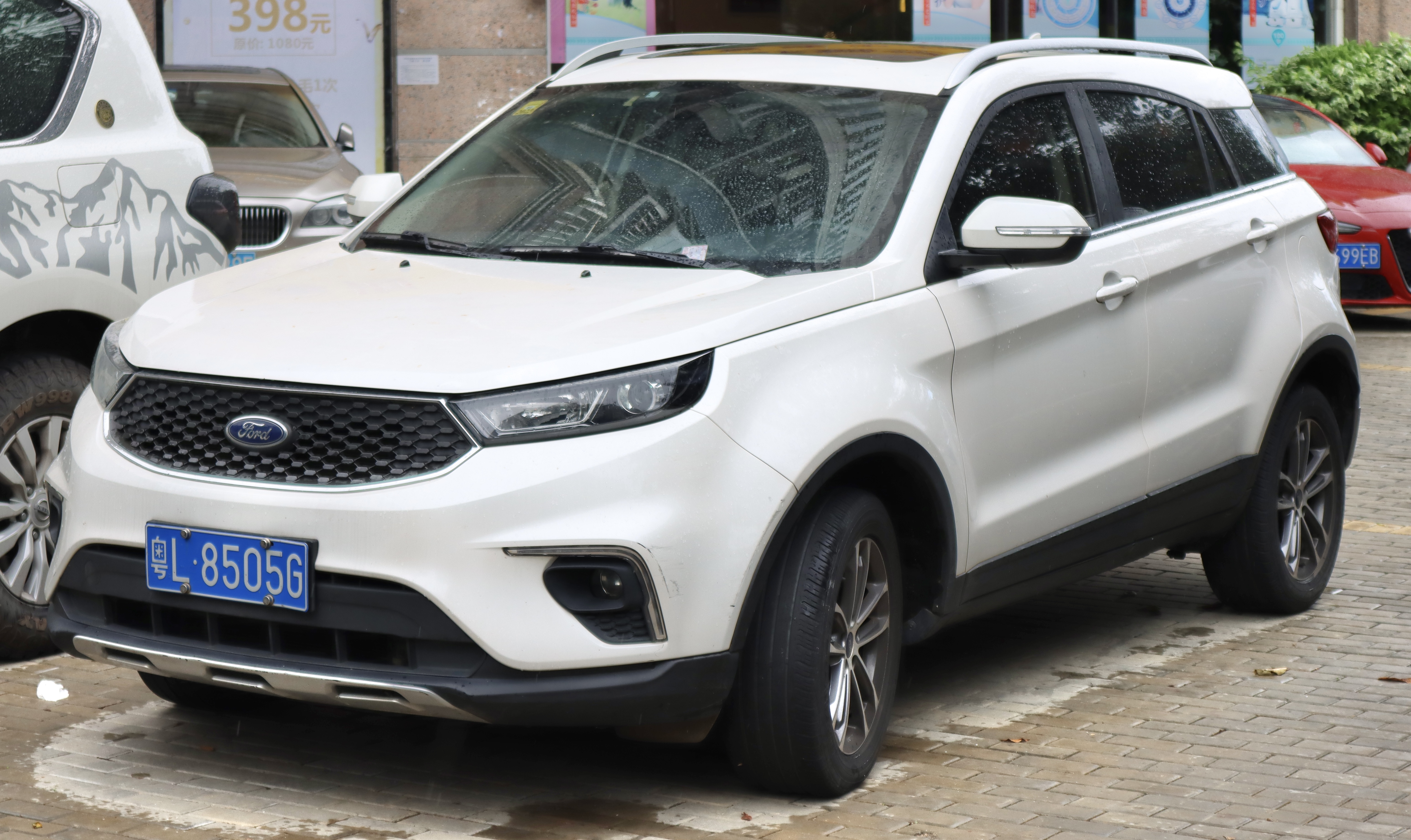

Overview
- Model code: CX743
- Production: 2018–2022
- Assembly: China: Nanchang (JMC Nanchang Assembly Plant)

Body and chassis
- Related: Yusheng S330

Powertrain
- Engine: Petrol: 1.5 L JX4G15C6L I4 turbo
- Electric motor: Permanent Magnet Synchronous Motor (EV)
- Transmission: 6-speed manual CVT; 1-speed direct drive (EV)
- Battery: 49.14 kWh liquid-cooled battery

Dimensions
- Wheelbase: 2,716 mm (106.9 in)
- Length: 4,580 mm (180.3 in)
- Width: 1,936 mm (76.2 in)
- Height: 1,674 mm (65.9 in)

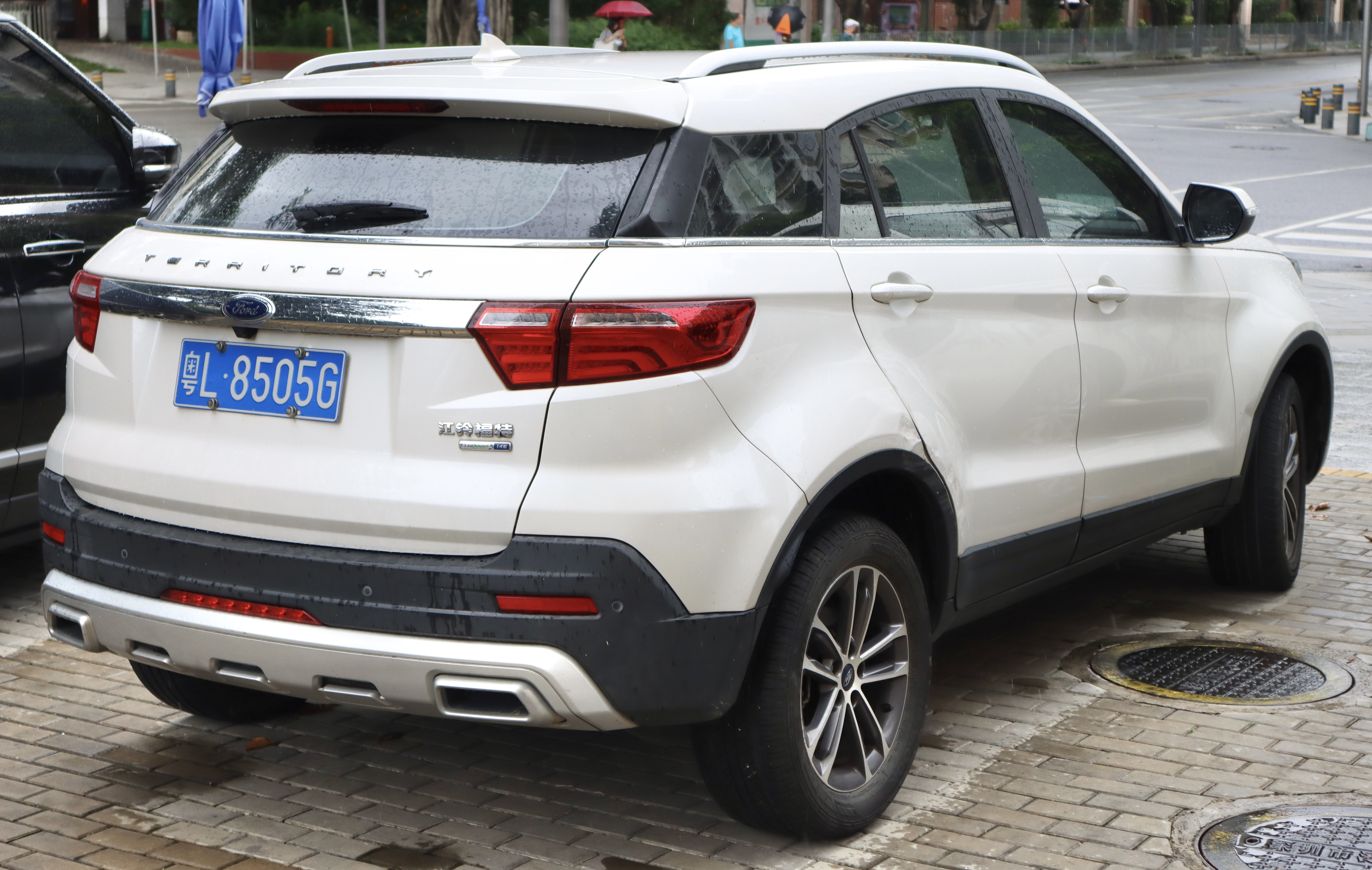
Rear view

The first iteration of the Chinese-built Territory was introduced during the 2018 Chengdu Auto Show in September 2018. It is based on the JMC-developed Yusheng S330 which was introduced for the Chinese market in 2016. The Territory went on sale in early 2019, with Ford China classifying it as an entry-level compact SUV in between the EcoSport and Escape.

The model was produced at JMC Ford's plant in Nanchang, China. Despite not being offered in the Australian market, Ford Australia had input in the design and development of the new Territory. Ride, handling, and NVH were tuned at Ford's Geelong Proving Grounds in Australia and in Nanjing, China.

The Ford Territory was given a mild refresh in early 2020 prior to its introduction in export markets. Changes to the Territory include a gloss black grille with a new pattern and restyled LED taillights.

From China, the model has been exported throughout South America and several left-hand drive Southeast Asian markets. The Territory was introduced in Brazil and Argentina on 7 August 2020, with units arriving at Ford dealerships in Brazil in September 2020. Pre-sale of the Territory in Chile began in the second half of August 2020 with deliveries in mid-September 2020. In August 2020, it made its debut in the Philippine market, and in Laos in December 2020. The model was also released in Vietnam on 11 April 2021.

=== Powertrain ===
The Territory is powered by a 1.5-litre EcoBoost 145 based on the JX4G15 petrol engine developed by JMC and AVL. Ford of Europe also helped in developing the powerplant. This engine features Miller cycle, and produces 138 hp (140 PS; 103 kW) and 225 N⋅m (22.9 kg⋅m; 166 lb⋅ft) of torque.

In Argentina, the Philippines, Cambodia, Laos, Chile, and Vietnam, the Territory's 1.5 turbo is rated at 141 hp (143 PS; 105 kW) and 225 N⋅m (22.9 kg⋅m; 166 lb⋅ft) of torque, while in Brazil, it is rated at 148 hp (150 PS; 110 kW) and 225 N⋅m (22.9 kg⋅m; 166 lb⋅ft) of torque. A 48V mild-hybrid version was available in China.

=== Territory EV ===
In August 2019, Ford released an electric version of the Territory in China. It uses a 120 kW (160 hp; 160 PS) electric motor, a liquid-cooled battery of 49.14 kWh and 360 km (220 mi) of NEDC range.

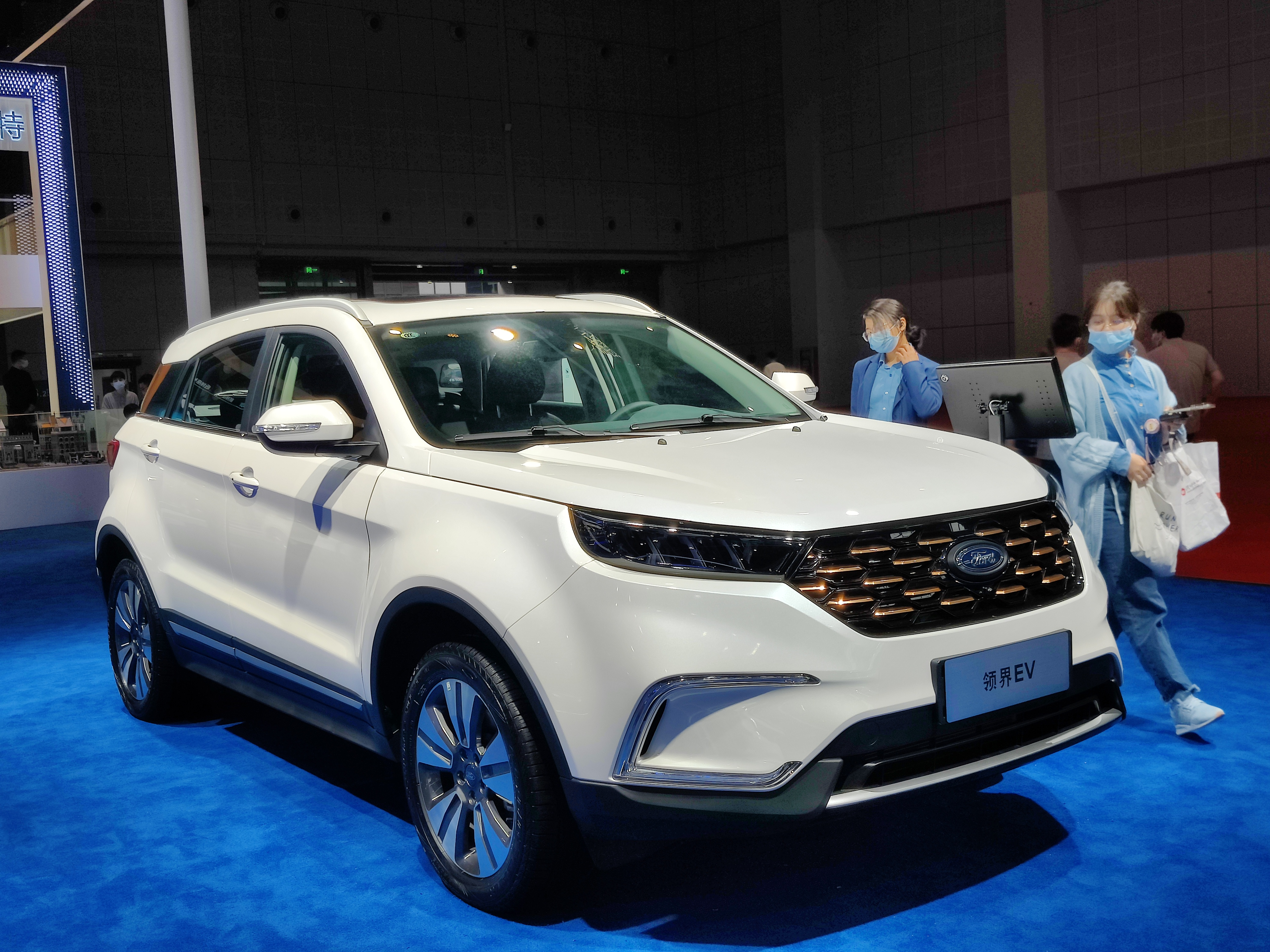
Ford Territory EV

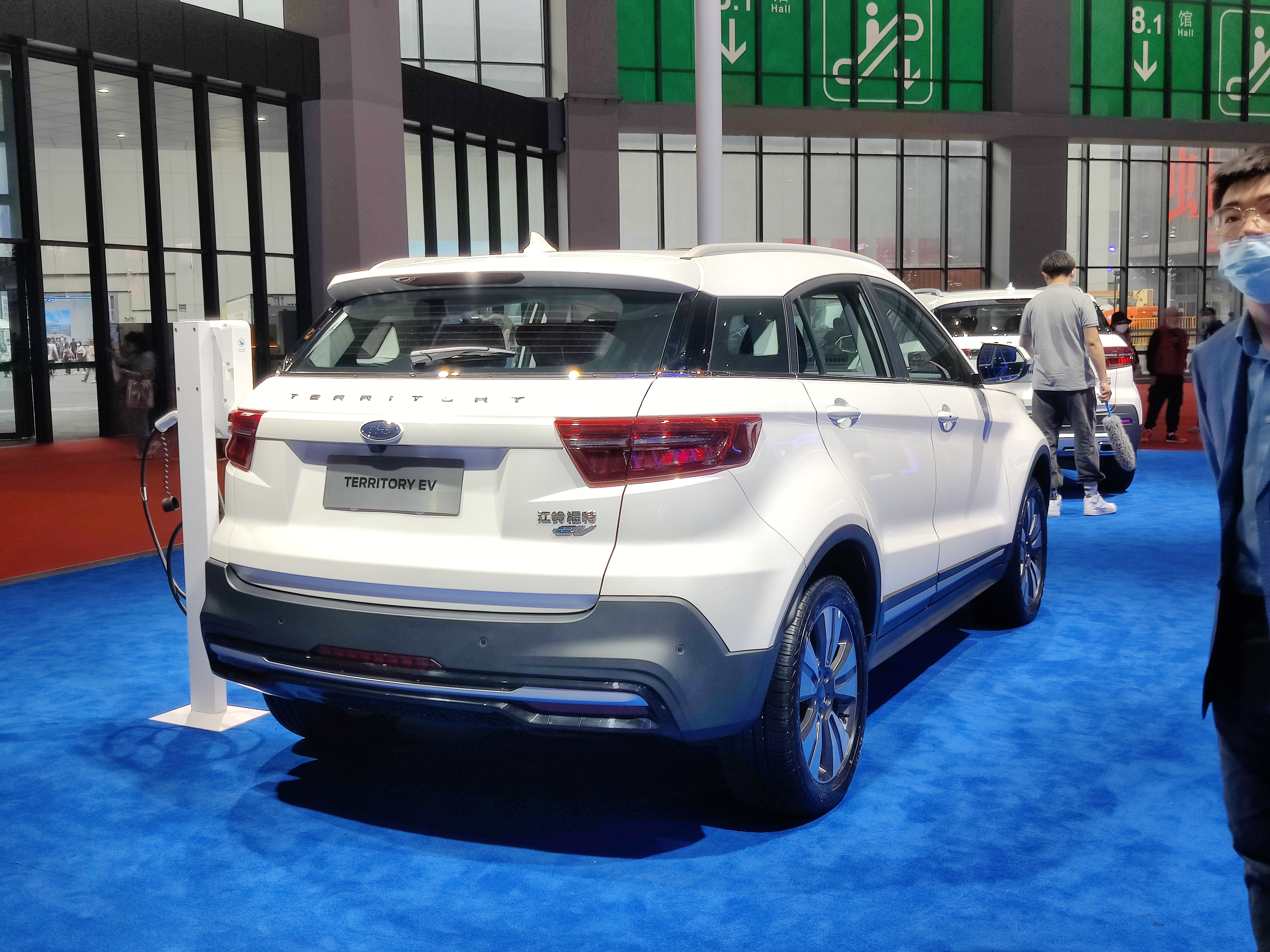
Territory EV rear view

=== Safety recalls ===
On 19 February 2021, Ford Philippines issued a recall on the Territory due to a faulty electric battery sensor or EBS bracket together with the wiring harness attached to the bracket.

== Second generation (CX743MCA; 2022) ==
Second generation
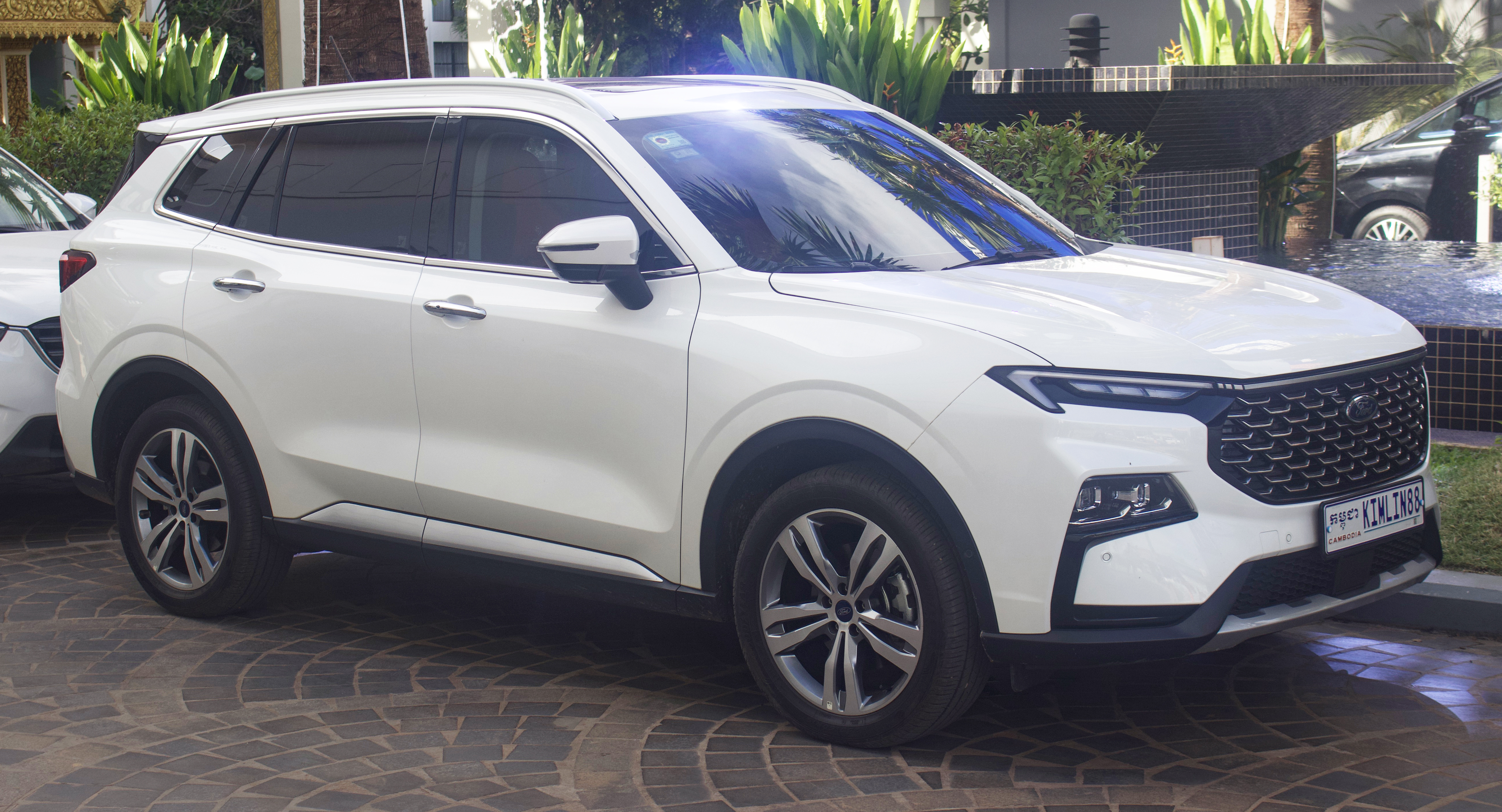

Overview
- Model code: CX743MCA
- Also called: Ford Equator Sport (China)
- Production: 2022–present
- Assembly: China: Nanchang (JMC-Ford; Equator Sport); Taiwan: Zhongli (Ford Lio Ho); Vietnam: Hai Duong (Ford Vietnam)

Body and chassis
- Related: Ford Equator

Powertrain
- Engine: Petrol: 1.5 L EcoBoost 4G15F6C I4 turbo; 1.8 L EcoBoost 4G18F6E I4 turbo (Americas and Middle East); Petrol hybrid: 1.5 L I4 turbo
- Transmission: 7-speed wet-clutch DCT; 2-speed DHT (Hybrid)
- Hybrid drivetrain: Power-split

Dimensions
- Wheelbase: 2,726 mm (107.3 in)
- Length: 4,630 mm (182.3 in); 4,685 mm (184.4 in) (Facelift)
- Width: 1,935 mm (76.2 in)
- Height: 1,706 mm (67.2 in)

Chronology
- Predecessor: Ford Escape (fourth generation) (Middle East)

In May 2022, Ford introduced the second-generation, Chinese-made Territory. Also produced in China by JMC Ford, it is the export market name of the Chinese market Equator Sport, a two-row version of the Equator. While it is based on the previous generation Territory underpinnings, Ford heavily updated its exterior styling to align it with Ford's global design language.

For the 1.5-litre EcoBoost engine option, the power output received a 17 PS (17 hp; 13 kW) increase to 160 PS (158 hp; 118 kW). Ford also replaced the CVT gearbox from the previous generation in favour of a 7-speed wet dual-clutch automatic gearbox.

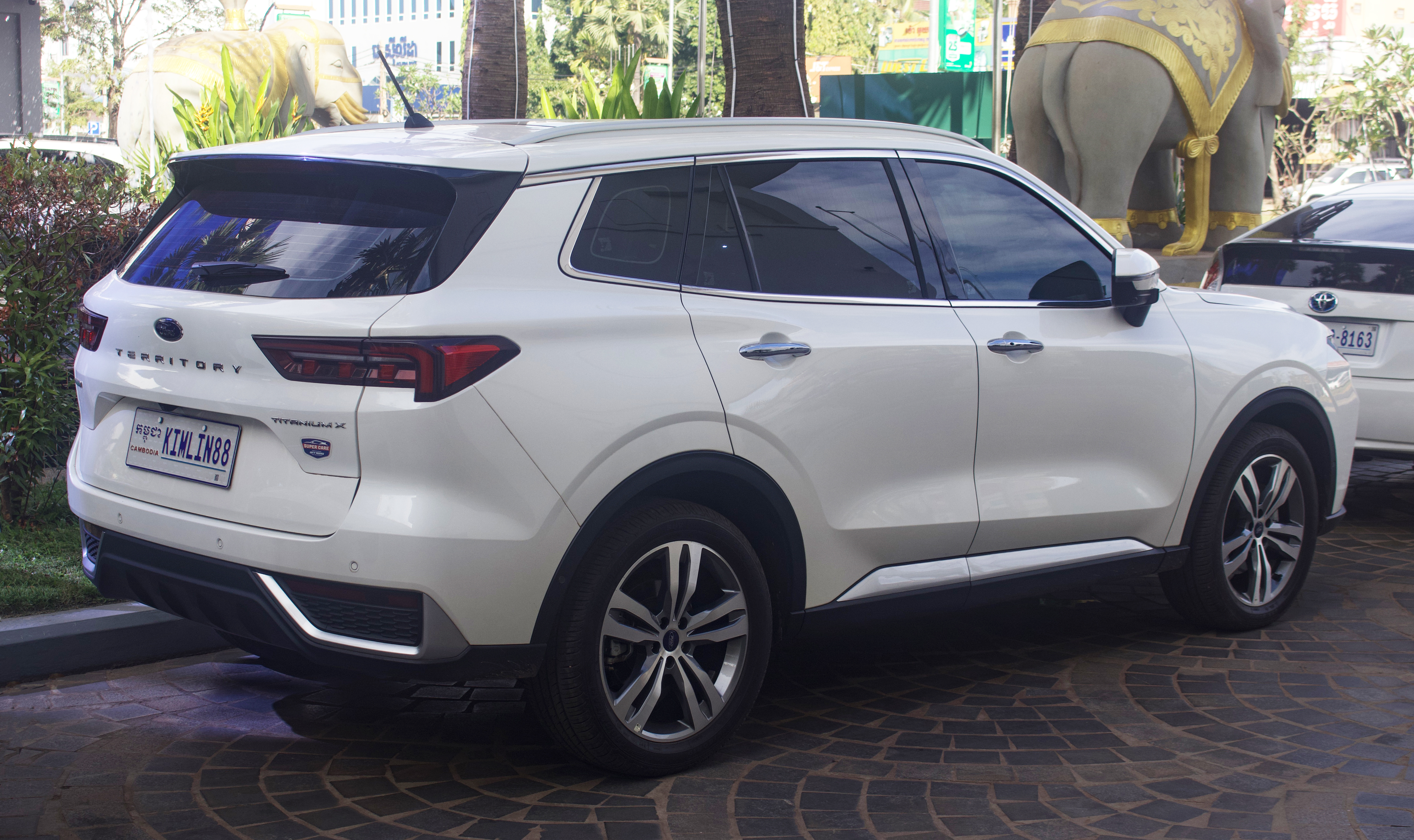
Rear view

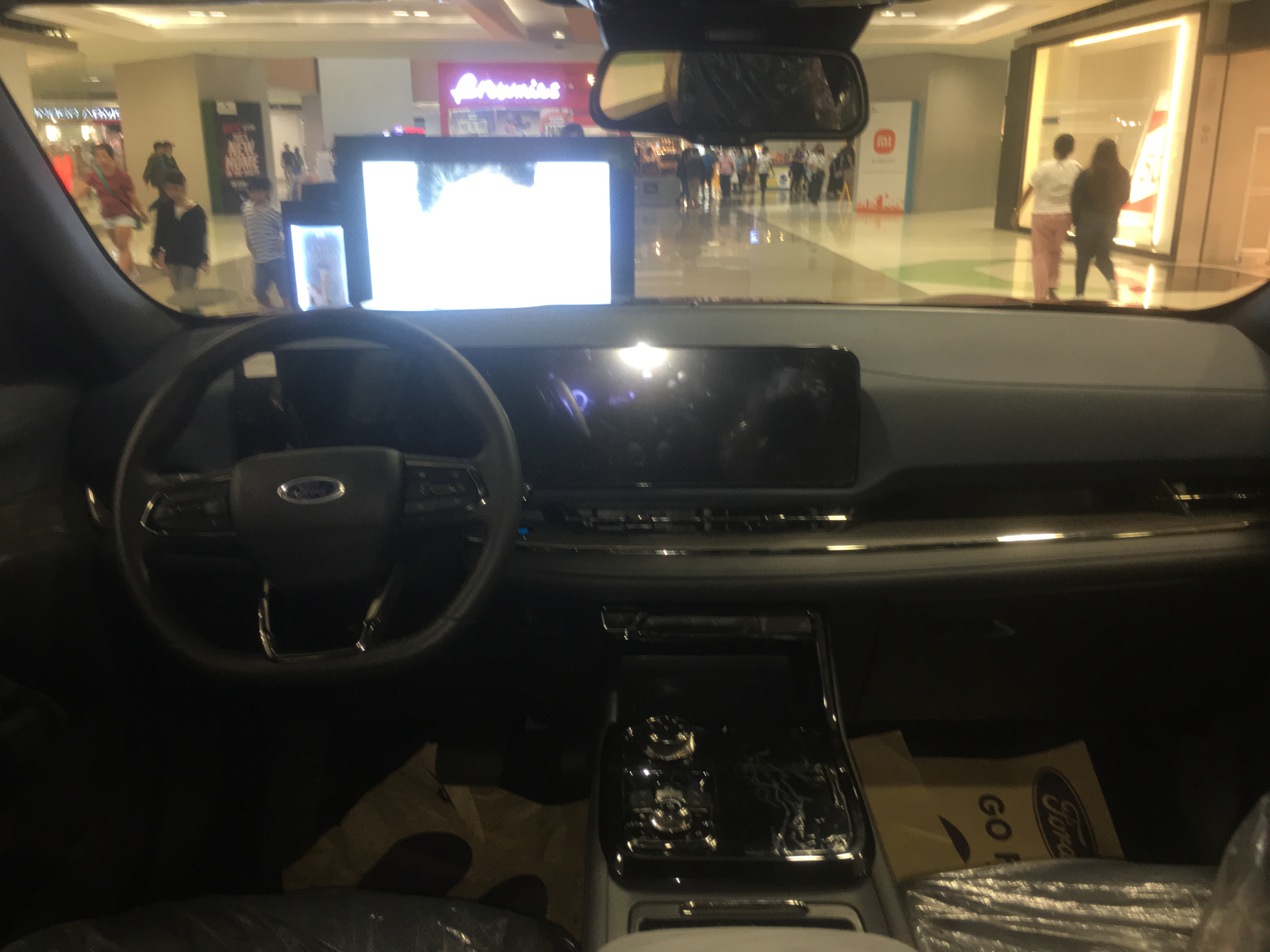
Interior

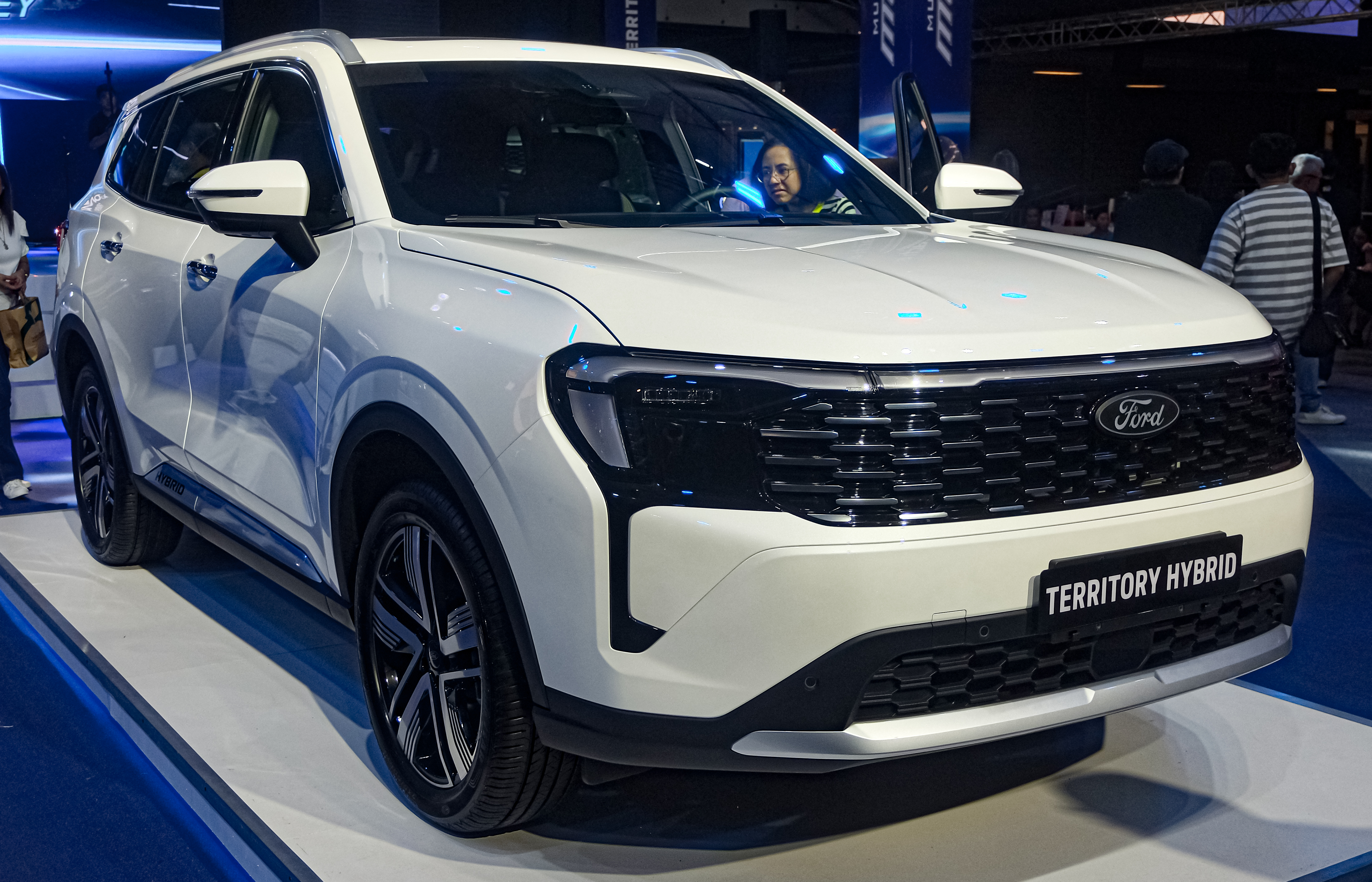
2025 facelift

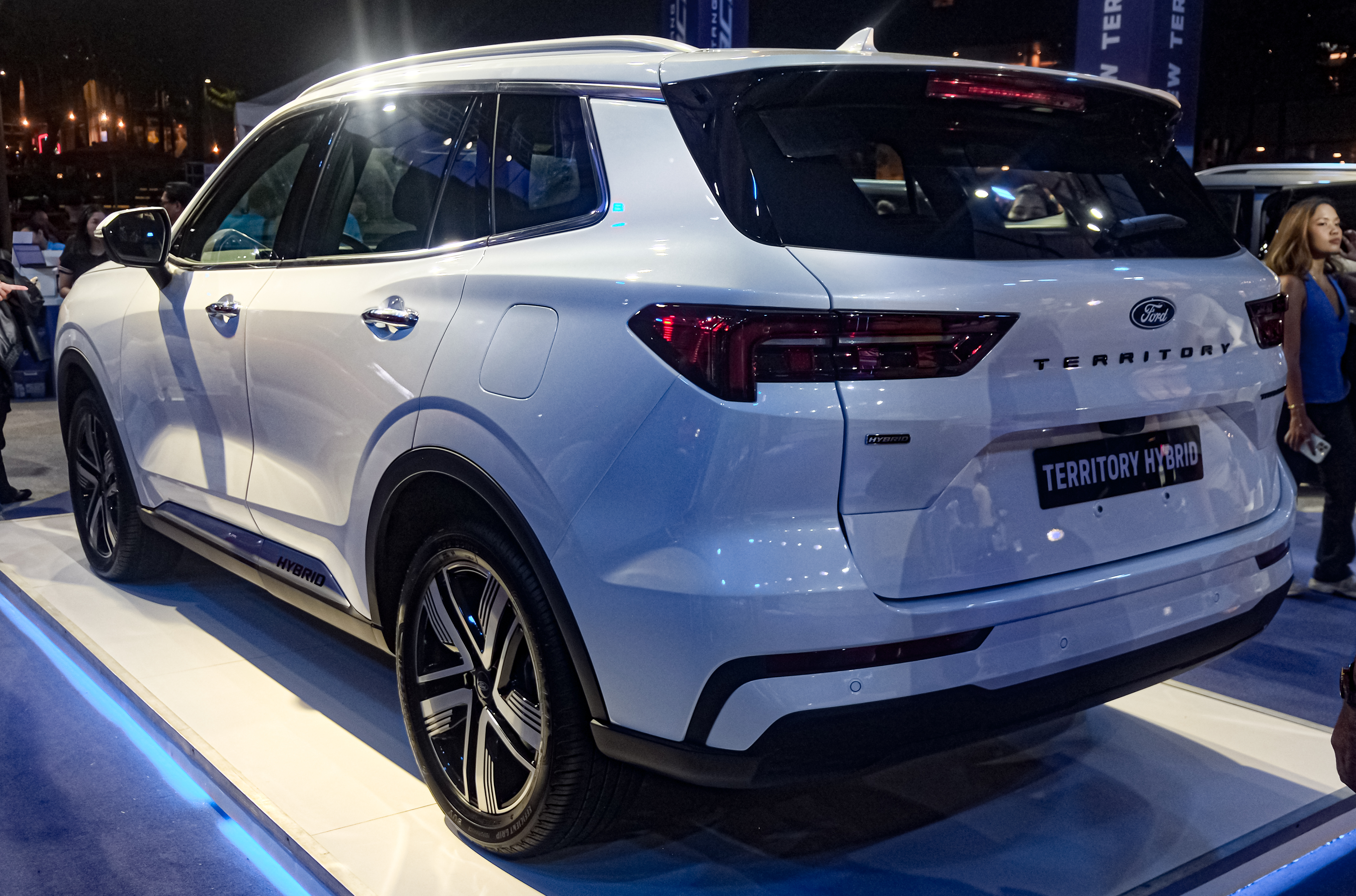
Rear view

=== Markets ===
==== Cambodia ====
The Territory was launched in Cambodia on 21 December 2022, with available in sole variant: Titanium X, powered by 1.5-litre EcoBoost turbocharged petrol engine. The special edition Dark Edition was added in 6 June 2024.

The facelifted Territory was launched in Cambodia on 14 November 2025.

==== GCC ====
The Territory was launched in the GCC market in the Middle East on 28 October 2022, with three trim levels: Ambiente, Trend and Titanium. All variants are powered by a 1.8-litre EcoBoost turbocharged petrol engine.

The facelifted Territory launched on 25 June 2025 with updated styling including all-LED headlights and a new grille, retaining the 1.8 L engine. A hybrid variant is expected later in 2025.

==== Laos ====
The Territory was launched in Laos on 6 April 2023, with available in sole variant: Titanium X, powered by 1.5-litre EcoBoost turbocharged petrol engine. The special edition Dark Edition was added in 21 November 2024.

The facelifted Territory was launched in Laos on 21 November 2025. The Titanium X with 1.5-litre Hybrid turbocharged petrol was added in 10 June 2026.

==== Mexico ====
The Territory was launched in Mexico on 5 October 2022, with three trim levels: Ambiente, Trend, and Titanium. All variants are powered by a 1.8-litre EcoBoost turbocharged petrol engine.

The facelifted Territory was launched in Mexico on 6 October 2025, with two trim levels: Trend and Titanium. Both variants are powered by a 1.5-litre Miller cycle turbocharged petrol engine with a power-split hybrid system paired with a 2-speed dedicated hybrid transmission (DHT).

==== Philippines ====
The Territory (second generation model for the Philippines) was launched in the Philippines during the 2023 MIAS event on 13 April 2023, with two trim levels: Titanium and Titanium X. Both variants are powered by a 1.5-litre EcoBoost turbocharged petrol engine. The Sport trim was added as the flagship trim in May 2024.

The facelifted Territory was launched in the Philippines on 8 August 2025, with two trim levels: Trend (replacing the Titanium) and Titanium X. Both variants are powered by a 1.5-litre Miller cycle turbocharged petrol engine with a power-split hybrid system paired with a 2-speed dedicated hybrid transmission (DHT). The Platinum trim was added as the flagship trim above the Titanium X in August 2026.

==== South Africa ====
The Territory went on sale in South Africa on 11 March 2024, with three trim levels: Ambiente, Trend and Titanium. All variants are powered by a 1.8-litre EcoBoost turbocharged petrol engine. It is the first right-hand drive market for the Territory. The Dark Edition limited edition model based on the Titanium trim was made available in June 2025.

The facelifted Territory was launched in South Africa on 21 April 2026, with the same trim levels and engine option from the pre-facelift model.

==== Taiwan ====
The Territory was launched in Taiwan on 18 November 2025 and sales commenced on 2 December 2025. The Territory sold in the Taiwanese market is produced by Ford Lio Ho Motor locally in Taiwan. It is available three hybrid trim levels: Territory EcoBoost, Territory Titanium (FHEV) and Territory Titanium, All variants are powered by a 1.5-litre Miller cycle turbocharged petrol engine with a power-split hybrid system paired with a 2-speed dedicated hybrid transmission (DHT).

==== Tunisia ====
The Territory was launched in Tunisia on 28 August 2025, with two trim levels: Titanium and Titanium X. Both variants are powered by a 1.5-litre EcoBoost turbocharged petrol engine.

==== Vietnam ====
The Territory was launched in Vietnam on 10 October 2022, with three trim levels: Trend, Titanium and Titanium X. All variants are powered by a 1.5-litre EcoBoost turbocharged petrol engine. The Sport trim was added in September 2024 to sit between the Titanium and Titanium X trim levels.

The facelifted Territory was launched in Vietnam on 15 August 2025, with the same trim levels and engine option from the pre-facelift model. The Sport trim was discontinued for the facelift model. In July 2026, the Platinum trim was added as the flagship variant.

== Sales ==
Year	China	Philippines	Argentina	Brazil	Mexico	Vietnam	UAE
2019	47,893						
2020	31,024	1,925		1,512			
2021	33,835	6,881	2,393	2,232			
2022	12,347		3,457	976	2,033		
2023	1,696	9,119	4,036	1,324	12,313	8,096	
2024	42	4,929	5,914	5,630	13,217	8,125	
2025			14,063	8,878	14,305		5,946
