= JMC Yusheng =

Car marque

- Founded: 2010; 16 years ago

JMC Yusheng is a sub-brand of Jiangling Motors.

== History ==
The JMC Yusheng (江铃驭胜) is a sub-brand of Jiangling (JMC) for crossovers and SUVs since 2010. It is Jiangling's first entry into the crossover SUV market. With the launch of the Yusheng S350 mid-size SUV at the time of the brand launch, the Yusheng S350 was originally the JMC Yusheng, and it spawned the JMC Yuhu pickup with the same platform. The SUV was later renamed the S350 and the Yusheng became the brand. In April 2015, Yusheng unveiled the S330 concept during the 2015 Shanghai Auto Show, and in 2016, the production version of the Yusheng S330 compact CUV was launched as Yusheng's second product.

== Products ==
- Yusheng S330 compact CUV: A compact crossover SUV.
- Yusheng S350 mid-size SUV: A mid-size SUV based on the platform shared with the Ford Everest.

== Gallery ==
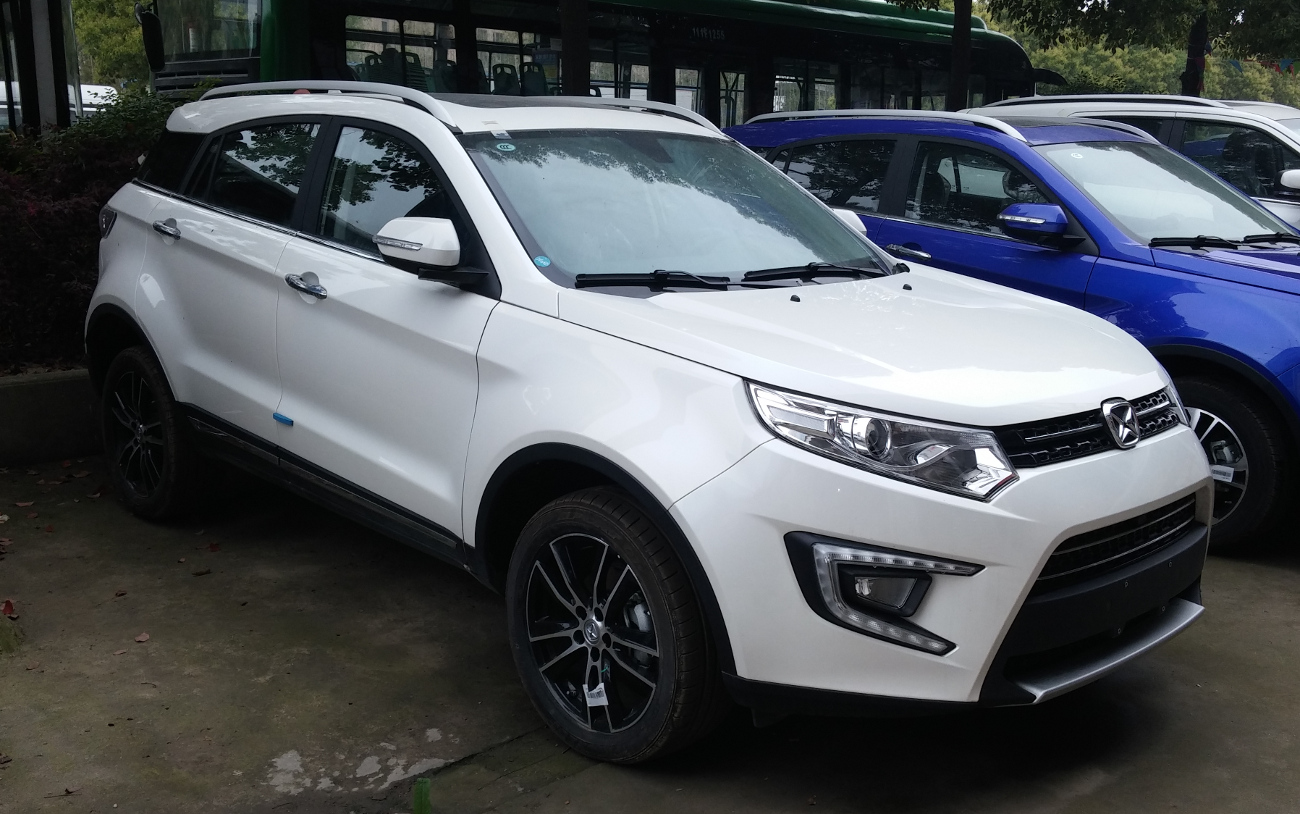
Yusheng S330

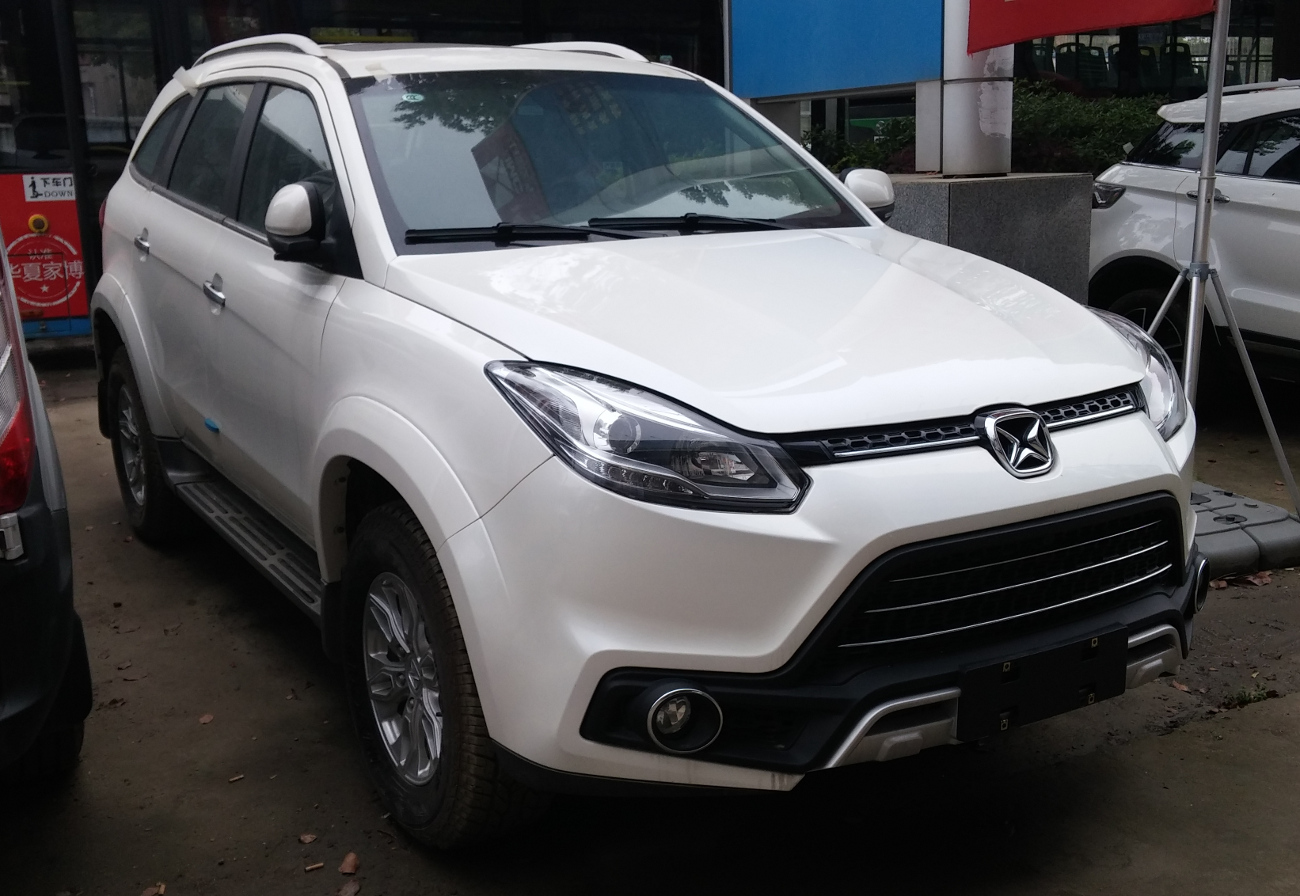
Yusheng S350
