= Yusheng S350 =

JMC Yusheng 驭胜
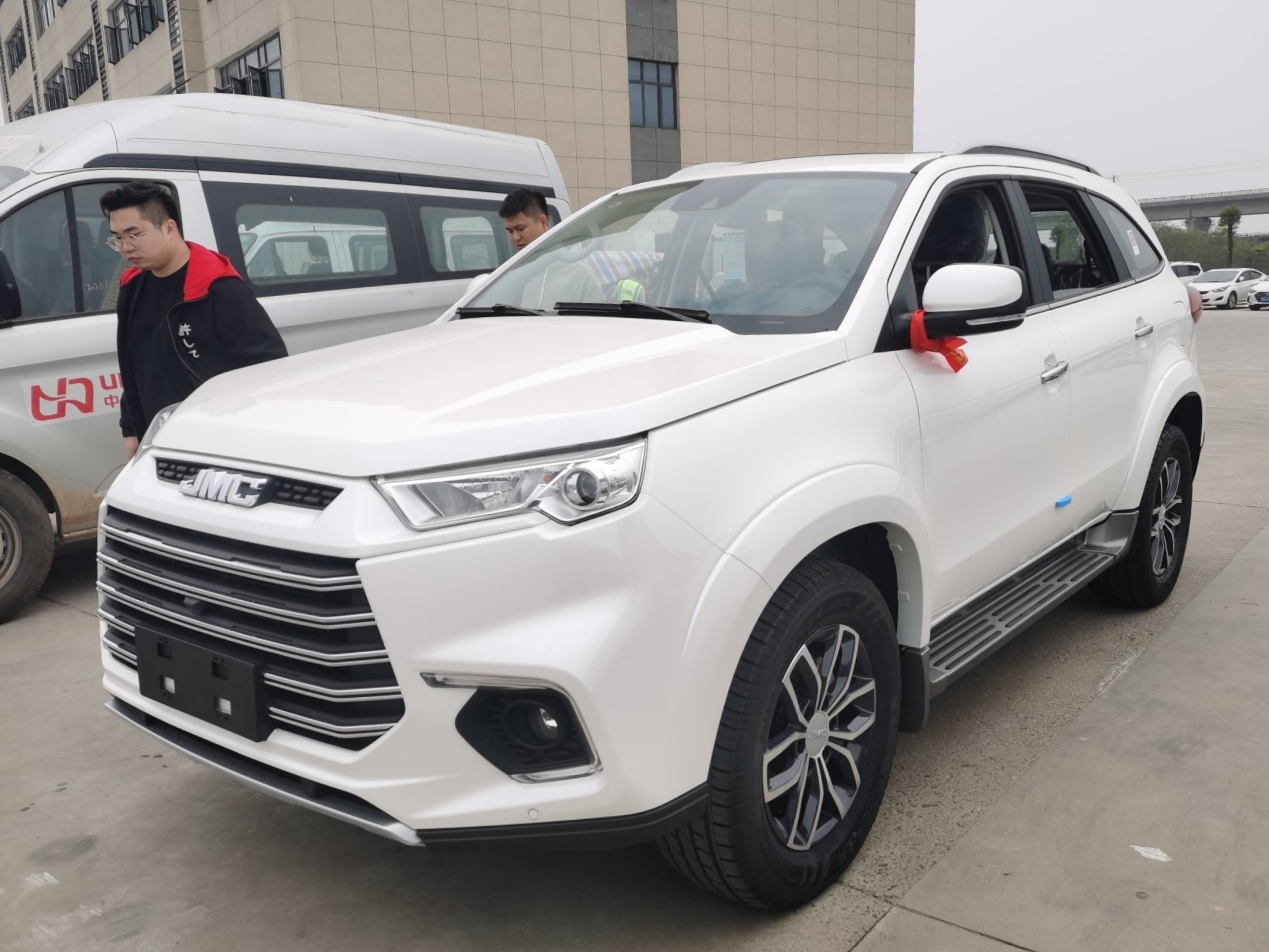
- Jiangling Yusheng S350 2020MY

Overview
- Manufacturer: JMC Yusheng; Bhamo Auto
- Also called: Yusheng N350; Bhamo Eagle (Myanmar); JMC Orion (Philippines)
- Production: 2010–2024
- Model years: 2011–2024
- Assembly: Nanchang, Jiangxi, China; Santa Rosa, Laguna, Philippines (Jiangling-DreamCo)
- Designer: ARRK Product Development Group (interior); Tesco TS S.p.A. (exterior)

Body and chassis
- Class: Mid-size SUV
- Body style: 5-door SUV
- Layout: Front-engine, four-wheel-drive
- Platform: N350 platform
- Related: JMC Yuhu

Powertrain
- Engine: 2.4 L 4G69 I4 (Petrol); 2.0 L 4G63T I4 (Petrol); 2.0 L JX4G20 I4 (Petrol); 2.4 L JX4D24 I4 (Diesel); 2.0 L JX4D20 Topanther I4 (Diesel)
- Transmission: 5-speed manual

Dimensions
- Wheelbase: 2,750 mm (108 in)
- Length: 4,798 mm (188.9 in) (2016–present); 4,775 mm (188.0 in) (2013–2015); 4,740 mm (187 in) (2011–2012)
- Width: 1,895 mm (74.6 in)
- Height: 1,852 mm (72.9 in) (2017–present); 1,840 mm (72 in) (2016); 1,862 mm (73.3 in) (2011–2015)
- Curb weight: 1,855 kg (4,090 lb)

Chronology
- Predecessor: JMC BaoWei

The Yusheng S350 is a mid-size crossover SUV produced by Yusheng (江铃驭胜), a sub-brand of Jiangling (JMC) since 2010.

== History ==
Originally simply called the JMC Yusheng before the name change and launch of other products under the Yusheng sub-brand, it is Jiangling's first entry into the crossover SUV market.

The engines of the Yusheng SUV is a 2.4-litre gasoline engine producing a maximum power output of 136hp and a 2.4-litre diesel engine producing a maximum power output of 122hp mated to a 5-speed manual transmission and a 6-speed automatic transmission by ZF.

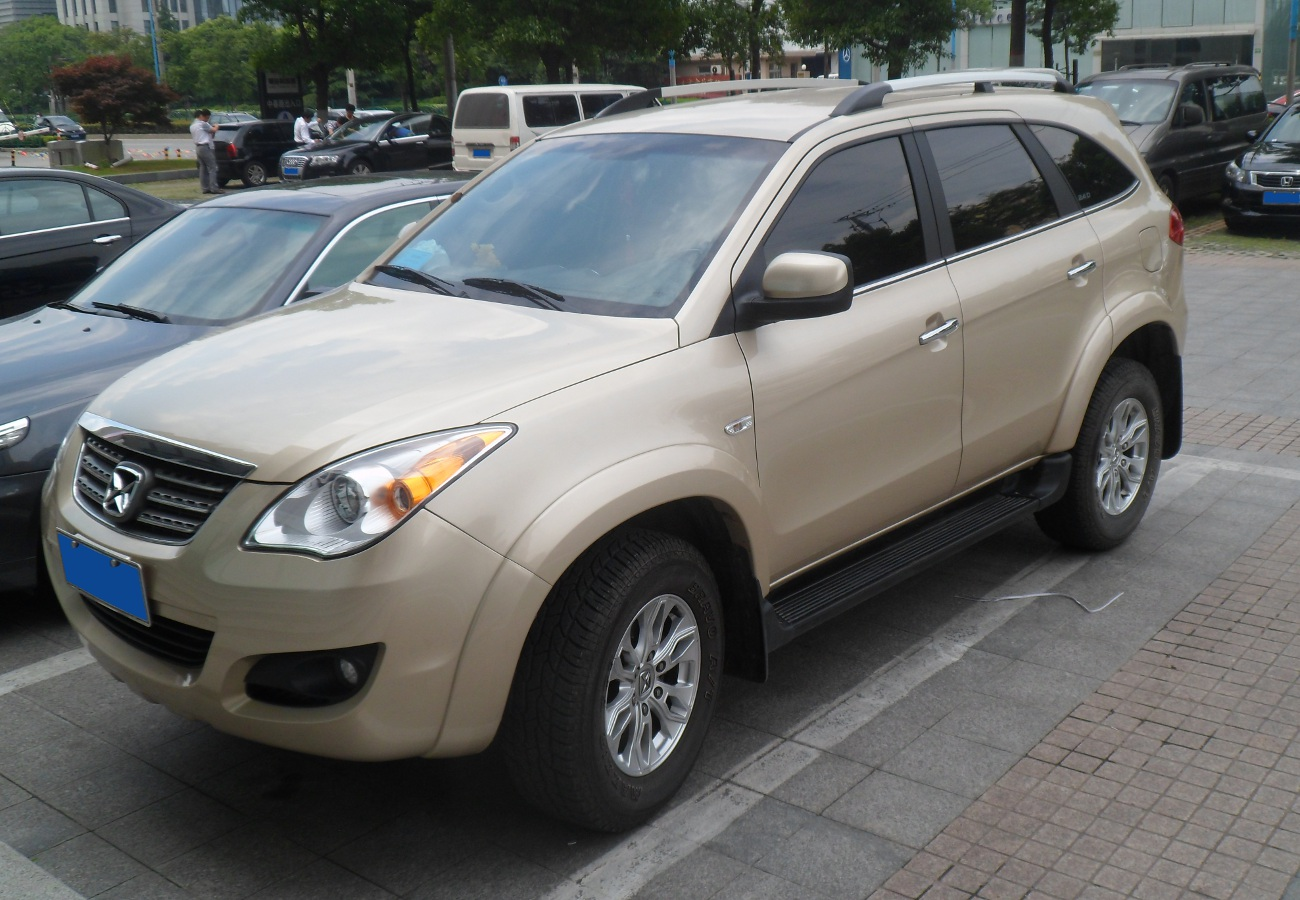
The front of the pre-facelift Yusheng (Before name change to S350)

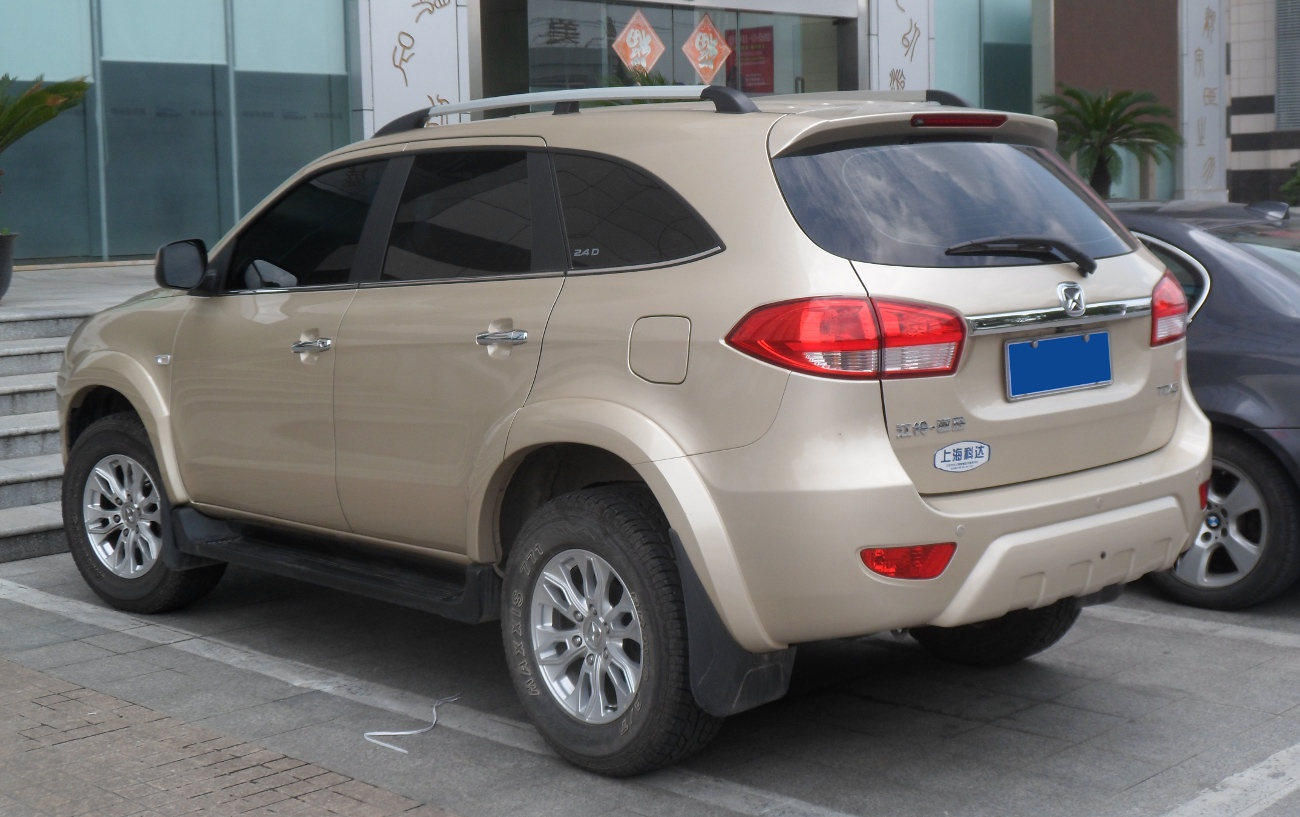
The back of the pre-facelift Yusheng (Before name change to S350)

The original JMC Yusheng received a facelift for the 2013 model year and was unveiled during the 2013 Shanghai Auto Show with the name change to Yusheng S350, officially expanding the Yusheng SUV into product series.

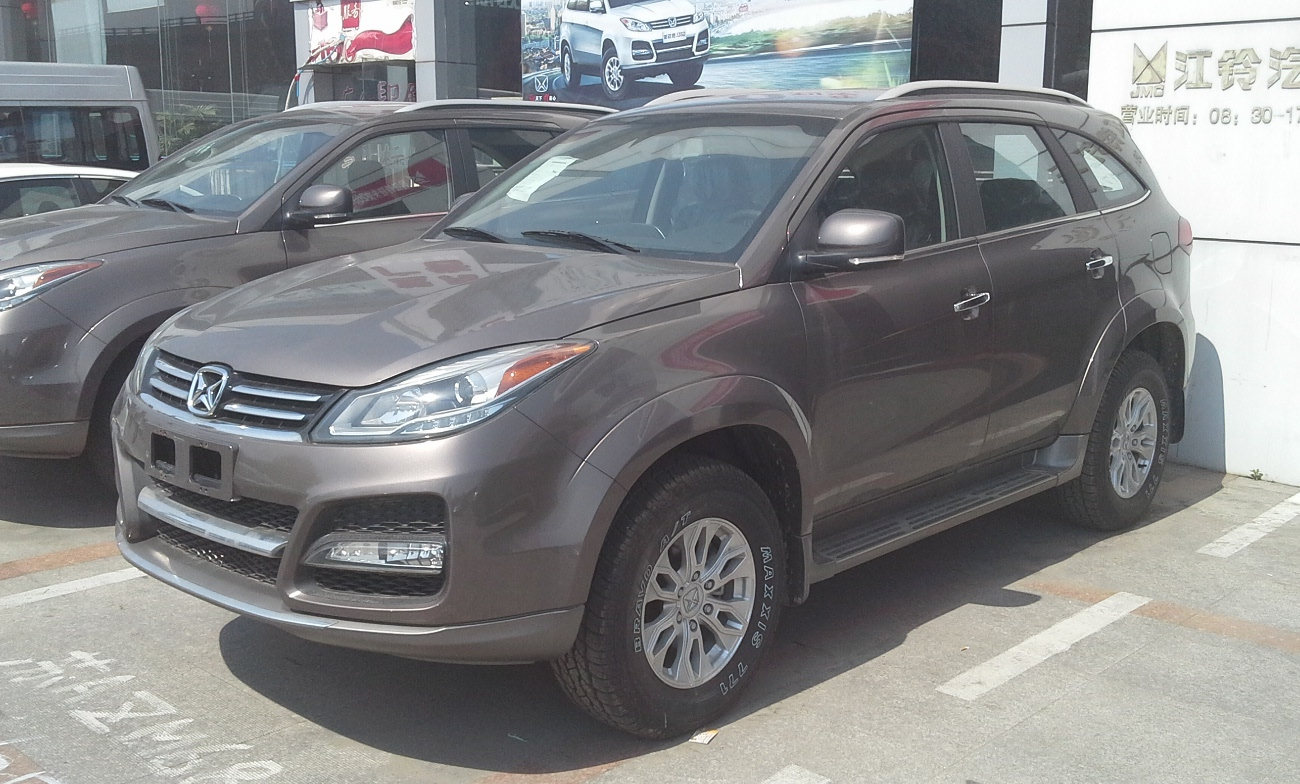
The front of the first facelift Yusheng S350

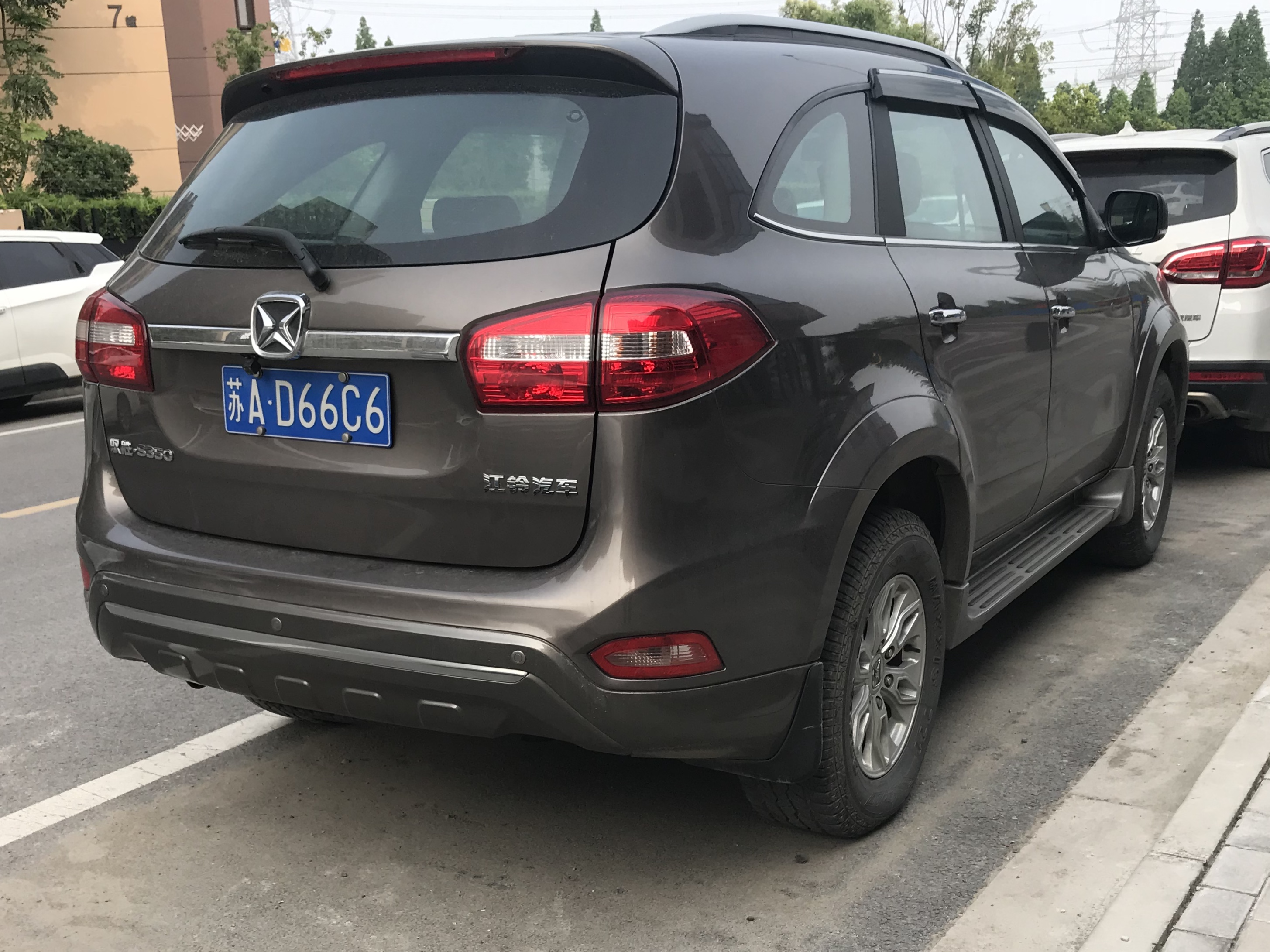
The rear of the first facelift Yusheng S350

The JMC Yusheng S350 received another facelift for the 2016 model year. While carrying over the original 2.0-litre diesel engine, an additional 2.0-litre GTDi gasoline engine was added to the lineup. The additional engine added for the 2016 model year was sourced from Ford and produced 205hp and 325N·m mated to a 6-speed automatic transmission.

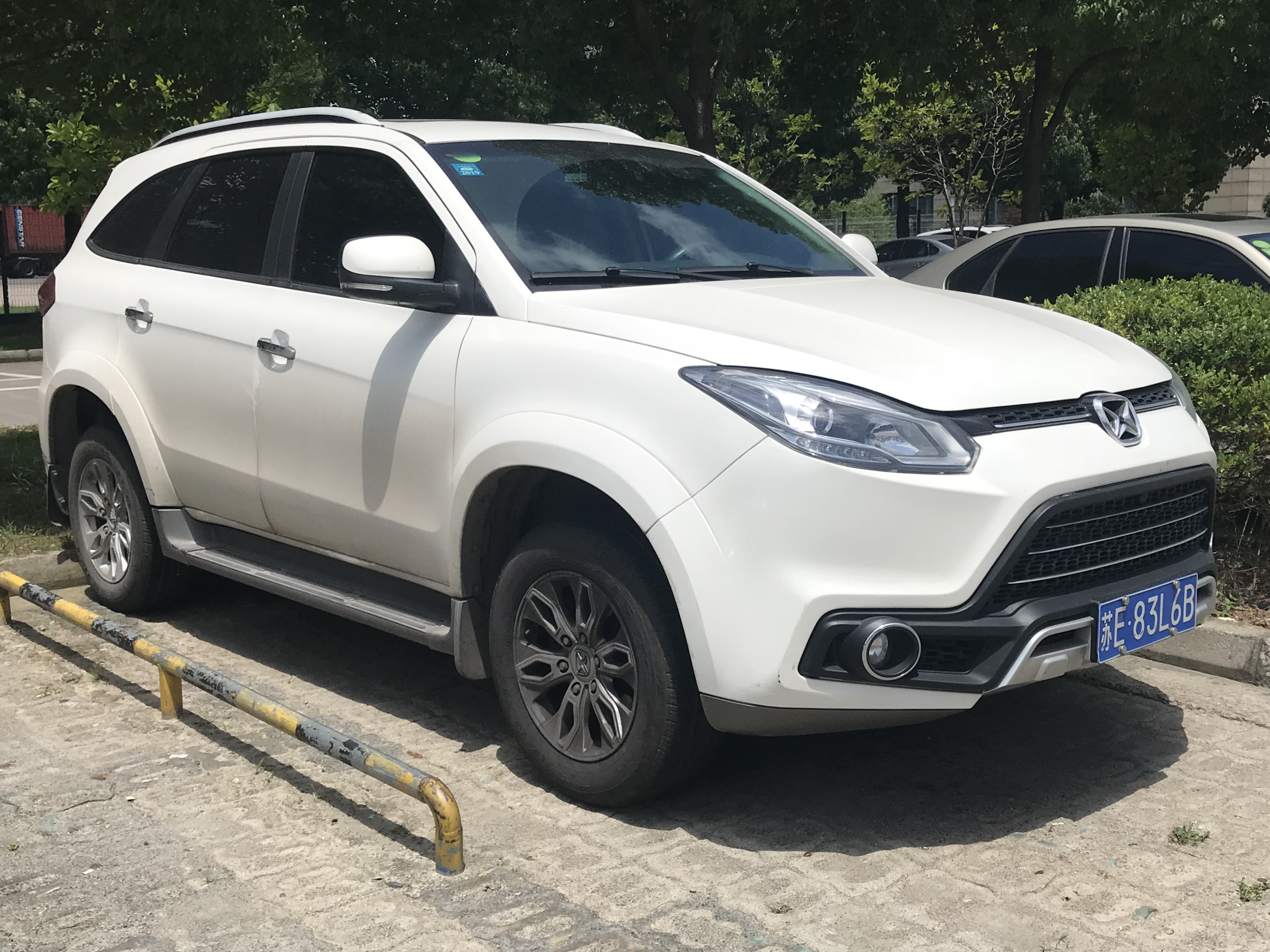
The front of the second facelift Yusheng S350

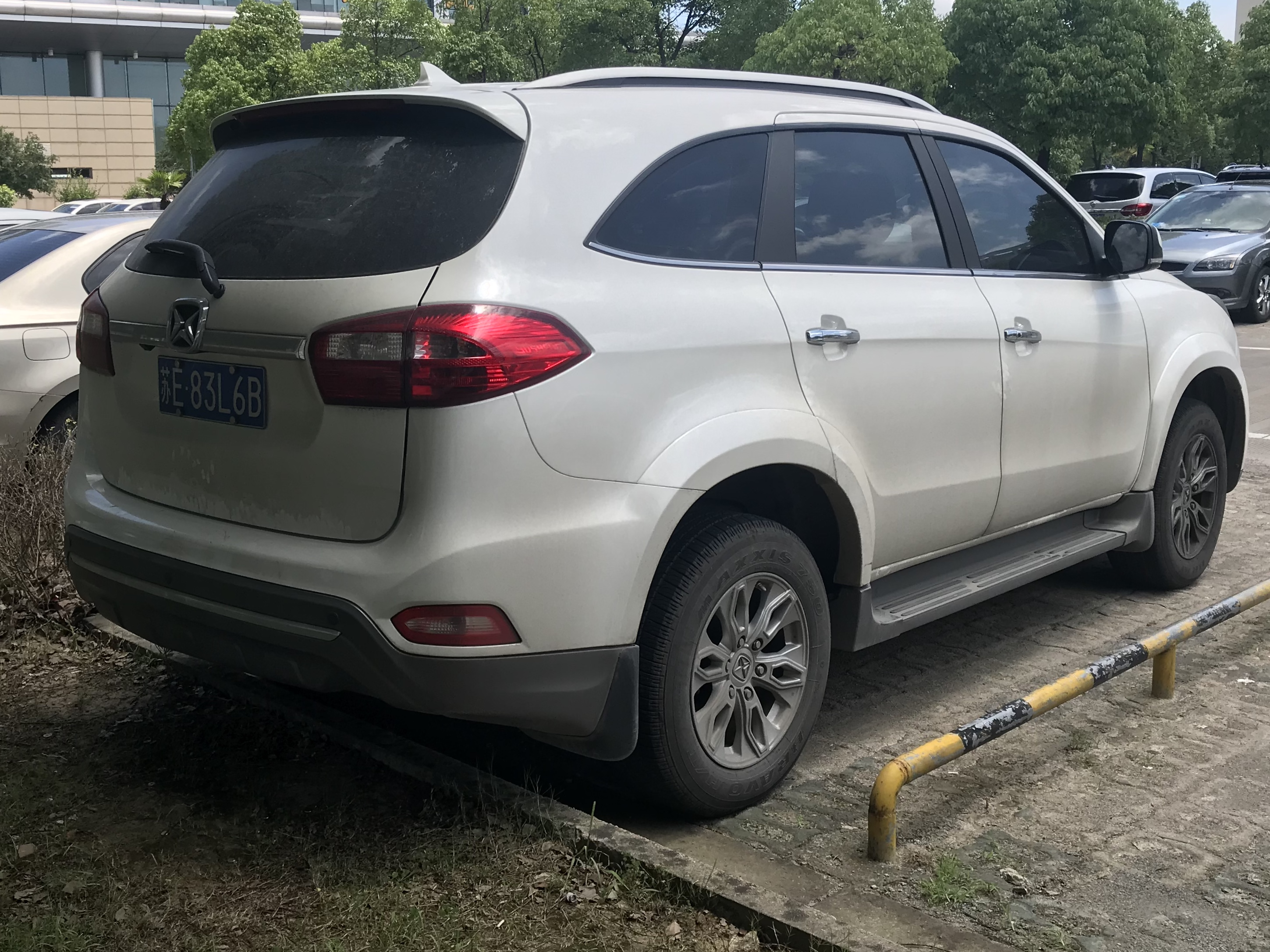
The rear of the second facelift Yusheng S350

The JMC Yusheng S350 received another facelift for the 2020 model year. Apart from the significant redesigns, the powertrain was also updated with the 2.0-litre gasoline engine now producing 220hp (162kW) and 350N·m while the 2.0-litre diesel engine produces 141hp (104kW)and 340N·m. Transmissions are a 6-speed manual transmission and a 8-speed automatic transmission.

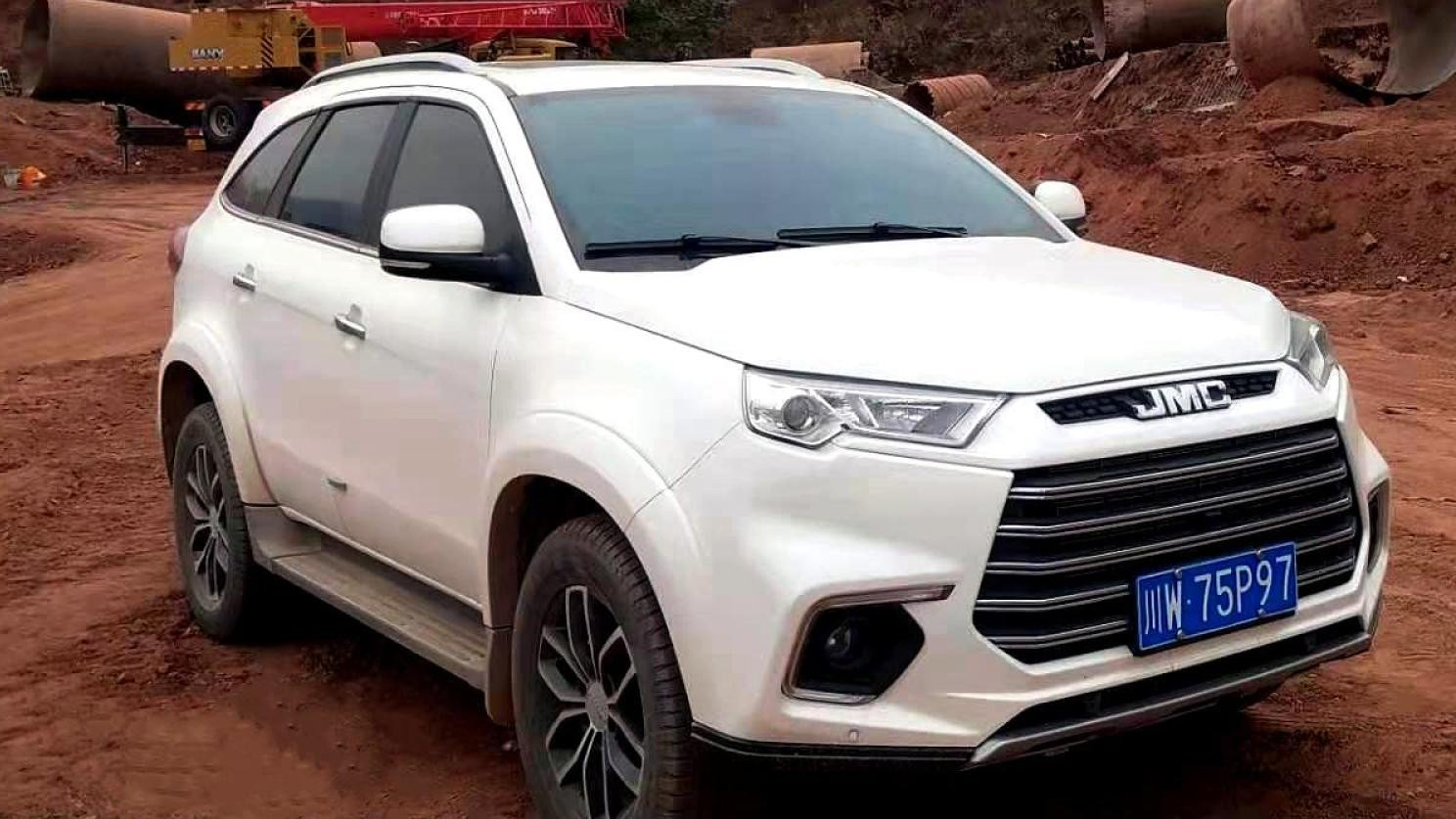
The front of the third facelift Yusheng S350

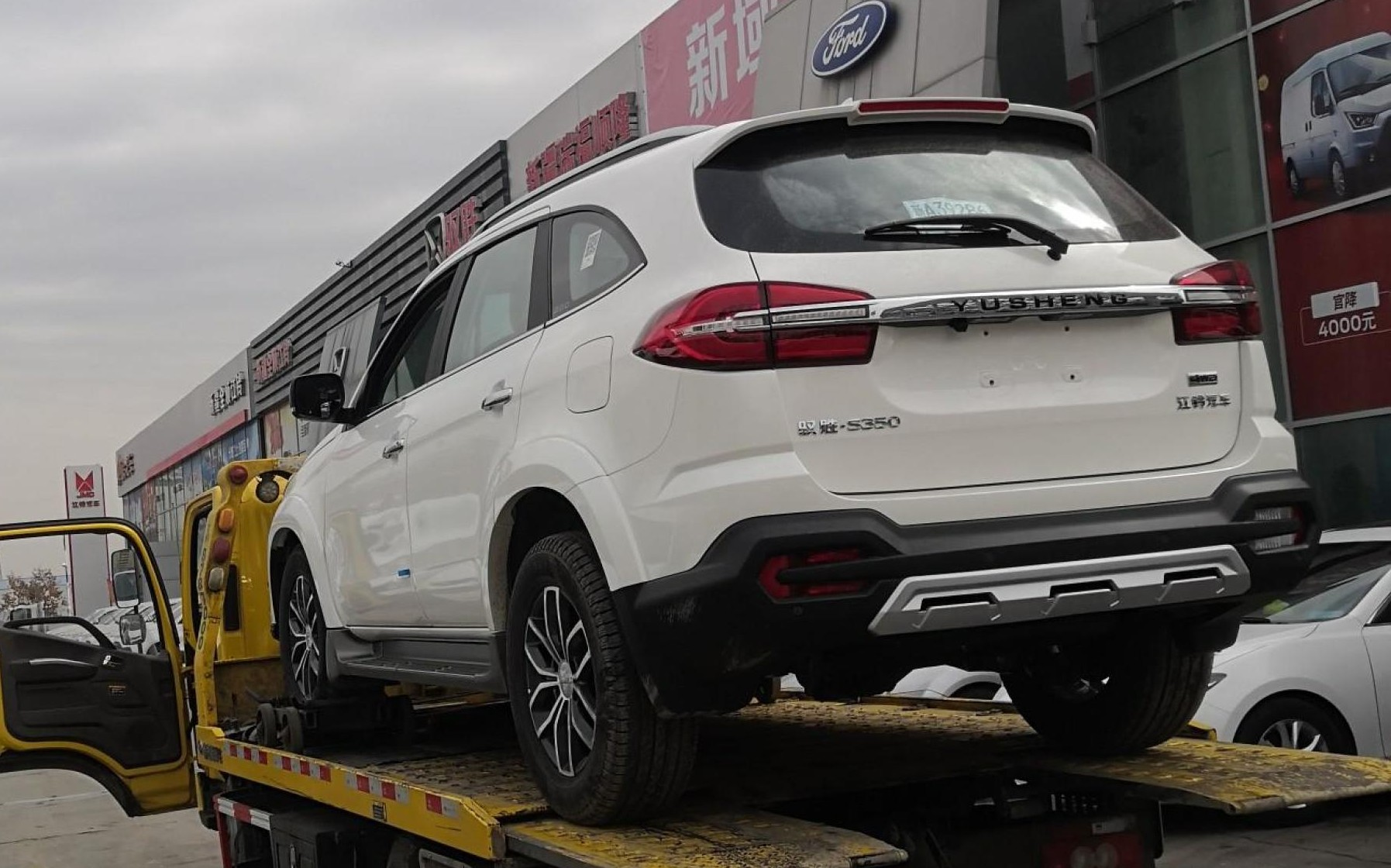
The rear of the third facelift Yusheng S350

== Yusheng N350 ==
The Yusheng S350 was renamed to N350 in Russia, Brazil, South Africa and some other countries. It was released in the October 2010 in foreign markets, and was the first model coming out of Jiangling Motors Co.’s (JMC’s) own passenger vehicle division.

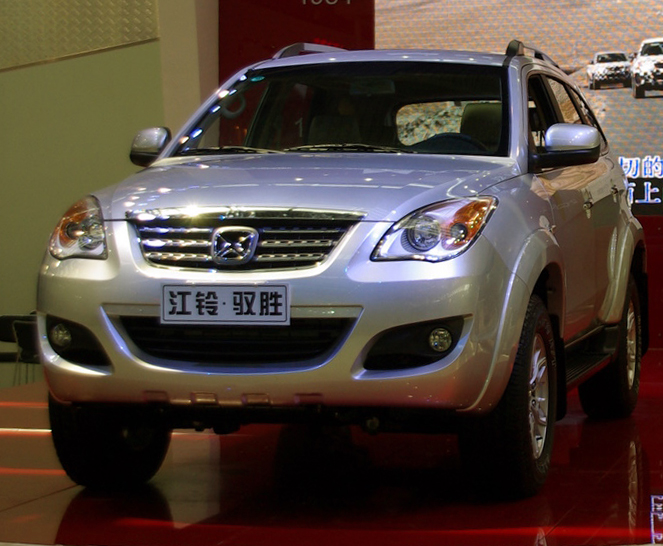
The front of the Yusheng N350

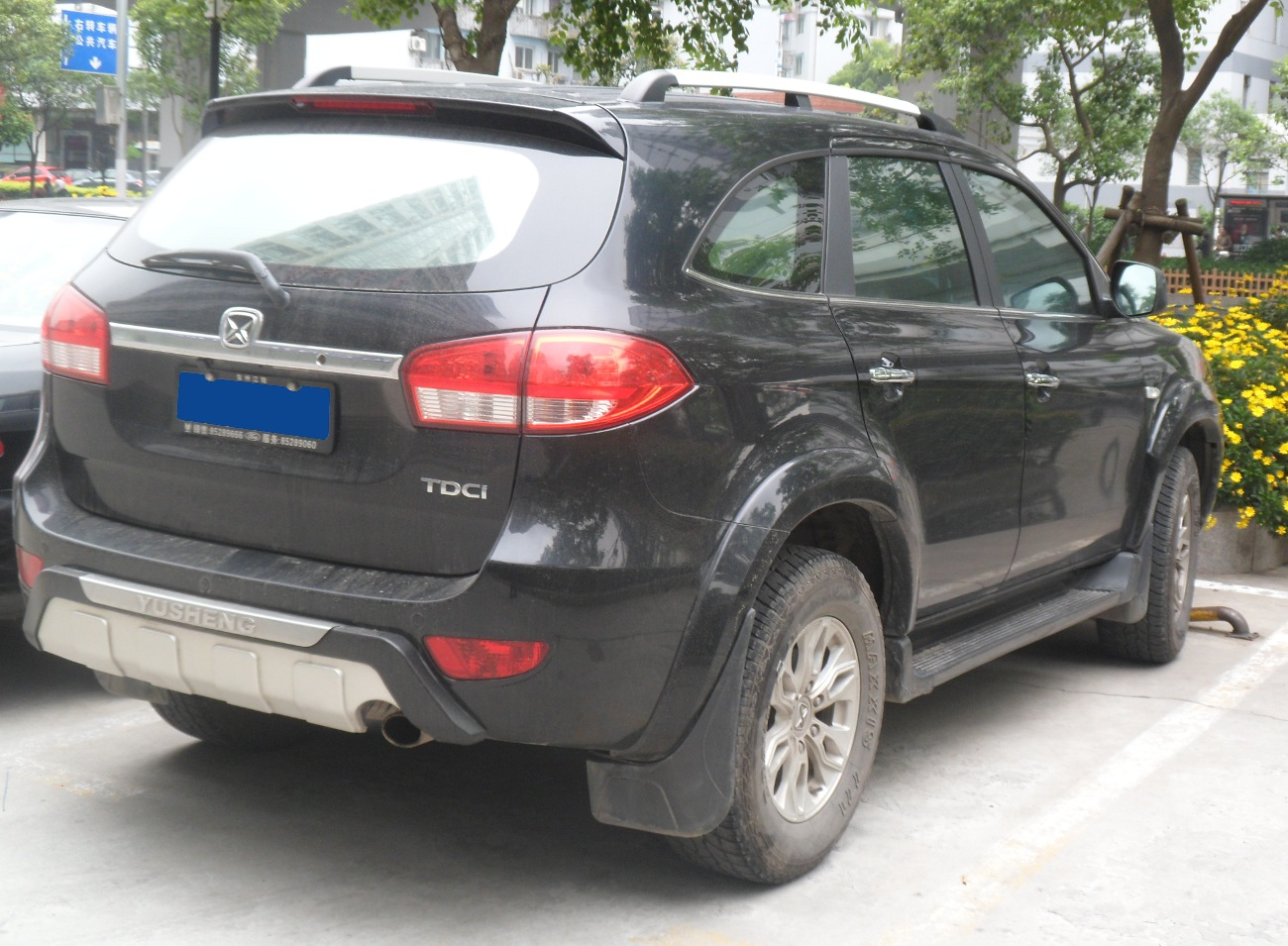
The rear of the Yusheng N350
