= Ford Vietnam =

Automobile manufacturer

Ford Vietnam Limited
- Type: Private joint venture
- Industry: Automotive
- Founded: 1995; 31 years ago
- Headquarters: Hà Nội, Vietnam
- Area served: Vietnam
- Key people: Ruchik Shah (general director)
- Products: Automobiles, pickup trucks, commercial vehicles
- Owner: Ford Motor Company (75%); DISOCO (25%)
- Website: ford.com.vn

Ford Vietnam Limited is the Vietnamese joint venture between Ford Motor Company (75%) and local Song Cong Diesel Company (25%), established in 1995. Ford's investment is credited with helping industrialize Vietnam. Ford Vietnam has its headquarters in Hanoi with an office in Ho Chi Minh City and an assembly plant located in Hai Duong province - 55 km (34 mi) east of Hanoi, with the capacity of 14,000 vehicles per year until a 2018 expansion.

In January 2020, Ford announced increased investment that would further expand capacity to 40,000 vehicles per year. As of 2023, Ford had acquired a 13.9% market share, making it the third-largest automobile company in Vietnam.

Ford Vietnam is the first automotive manufacturer in Vietnam receiving ISO 9001, ISO 14001 and QS9000 accreditation, ISO/TS16949 - 2002.
