= Landwind X6 =

Chinese mid-size SUV

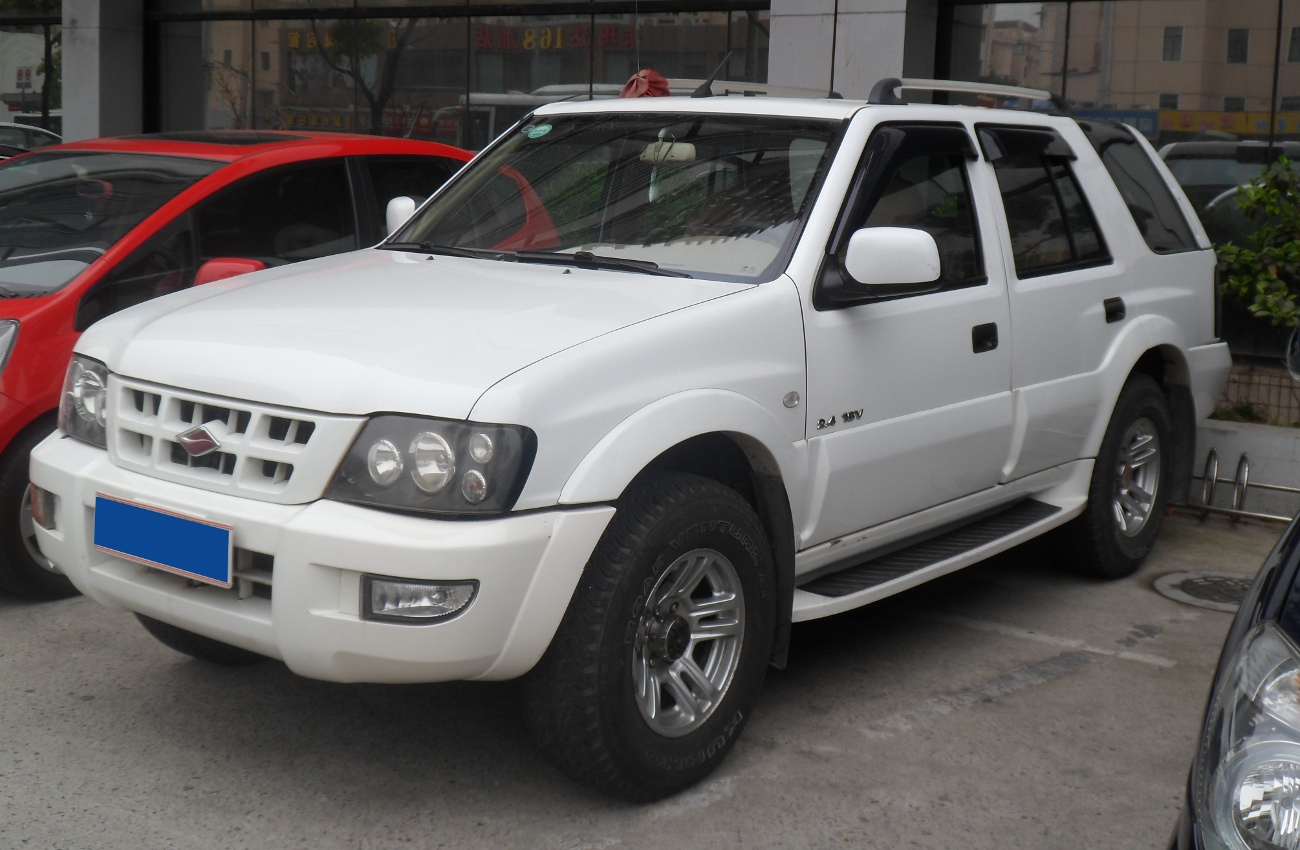
- Jiangling Landwind X6 in Shanghai

Overview
- Manufacturer: Landwind (Jiangling Motor Holding)
- Also called: Landwind X9 (3-door version); Landwind X-Pedition; Jiangling Baowei
- Production: 2001–2009 (Landwind); 2005–2016 (Jiangling); 2007–present (Philippines)
- Assembly: Nanchang, Jiangxi, China; Santa Rosa, Philippines (Jiangling-DreamCo)

Body and chassis
- Class: Mid-size SUV; Pickup truck (Jiangling Baodian/JMC Boarding/JMC Hunter)
- Body style: 3-door SUV (X9); 5-door SUV (X6); LWB 5-door SUV (JMC Baowei); 4-door Pick-up Truck (Jiangling Baodian/JMC Boarding/JMC Hunter)
- Layout: Front-engine, rear-wheel-drive Front-engine, four-wheel-drive
- Related: Isuzu MU (First generation); Jiangling Baodian; JMC Boarding

Powertrain
- Engine: 1.8 L 4G18 I4 petrol 2.0 L 4G63 I4 petrol 2.4 L 4G64 I4 petrol 2.4 L 4G69 I4 petrol 2.8 L 4JB1 I4 diesel 2.9 L JX4D30 I4 diesel
- Transmission: 5-speed manual 6-speed manual

Dimensions
- Wheelbase: 3,025 mm (119.1 in)–3,380 mm (133.1 in) (Baodian)
- Length: 5,050 mm (198.8 in)–5,405 mm (212.8 in) (Baodian); 5,115 mm (201.4 in) (Baowei)
- Width: 1,690 mm (66.5 in)–1,720 mm (67.7 in) (Baodian); 1,860 mm (73.2 in) (Baowei)
- Height: 1,645 mm (64.8 in)–1,710 mm (67.3 in) (Baodian); 1,795 mm (70.7 in) (Baowei)

Chronology
- Successor: Yusheng S350 (SUV); JMC Yuhu (Pickup)

The Landwind X6 is a mid-size SUV produced by Jiangling Motor Holding, a joint venture between Changan Auto and Jiangling Motors Corporation Group (JMCG).

== Overview ==
The Landwind X6 was originally known as the JMC Landwind, and the name changed to Landwind X6 when Landwind became an independent brand under JMC. Like some Chinese-made cars, the JMC Landwind is largely based on older imported technology and design, specifically the Isuzu Rodeo, which was sold from 1998 to 2004. Two SUVs are built on this platform: the 5-door Landwind X6 and the 3-door Landwind X9. The 3-door Landwind X9 was discontinued in 2016.

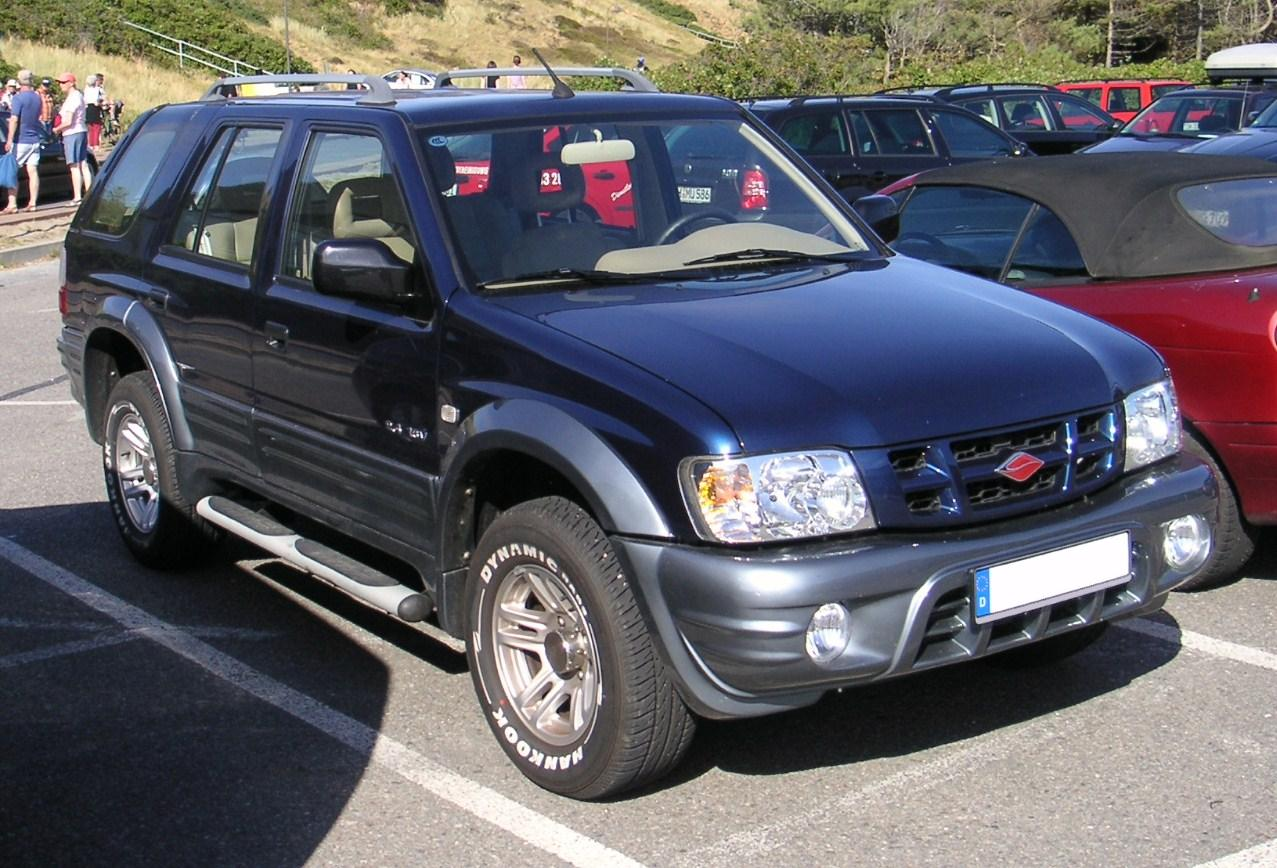
Landwind X6 pre-facelift

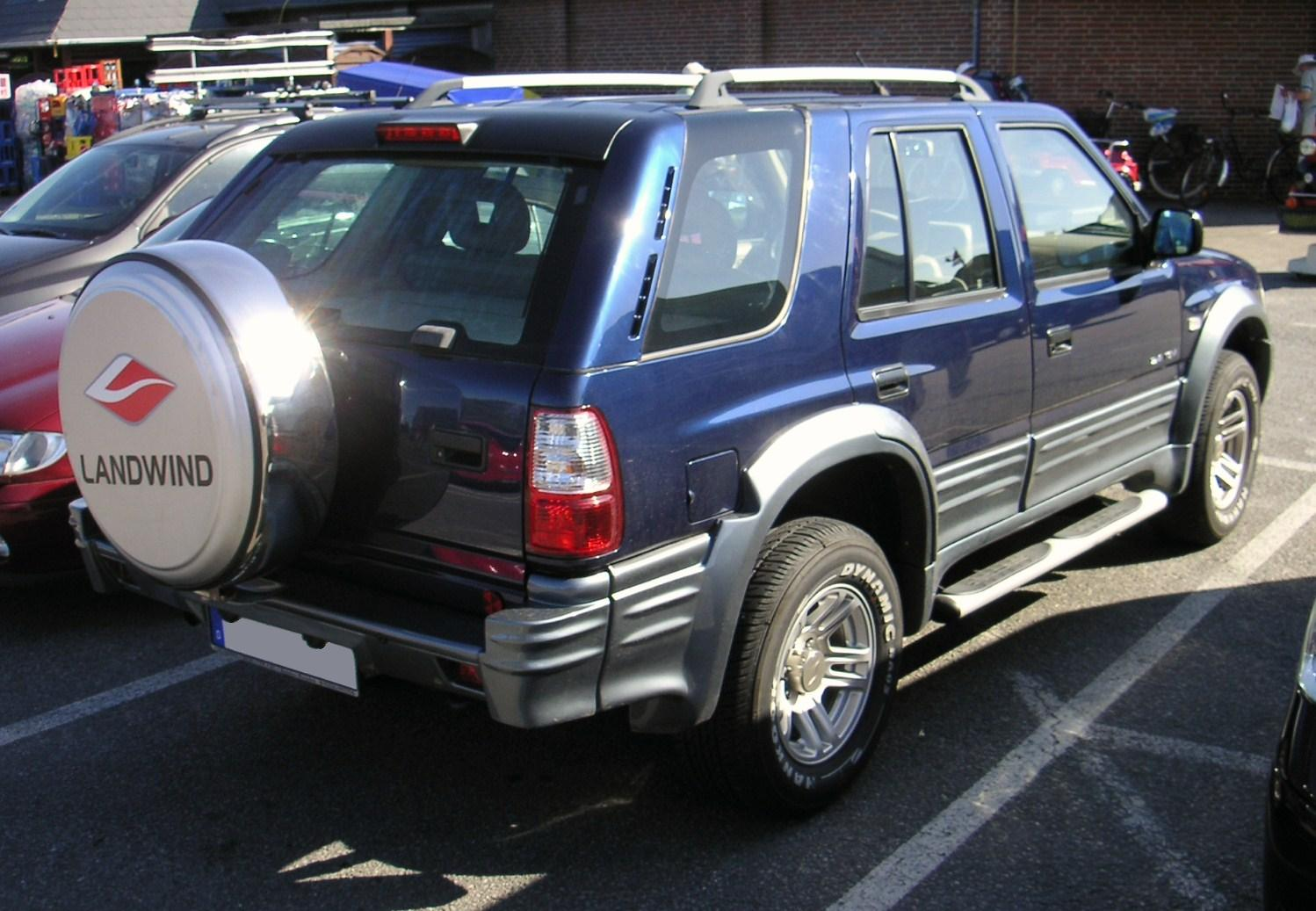
Landwind X6 pre-facelift rear

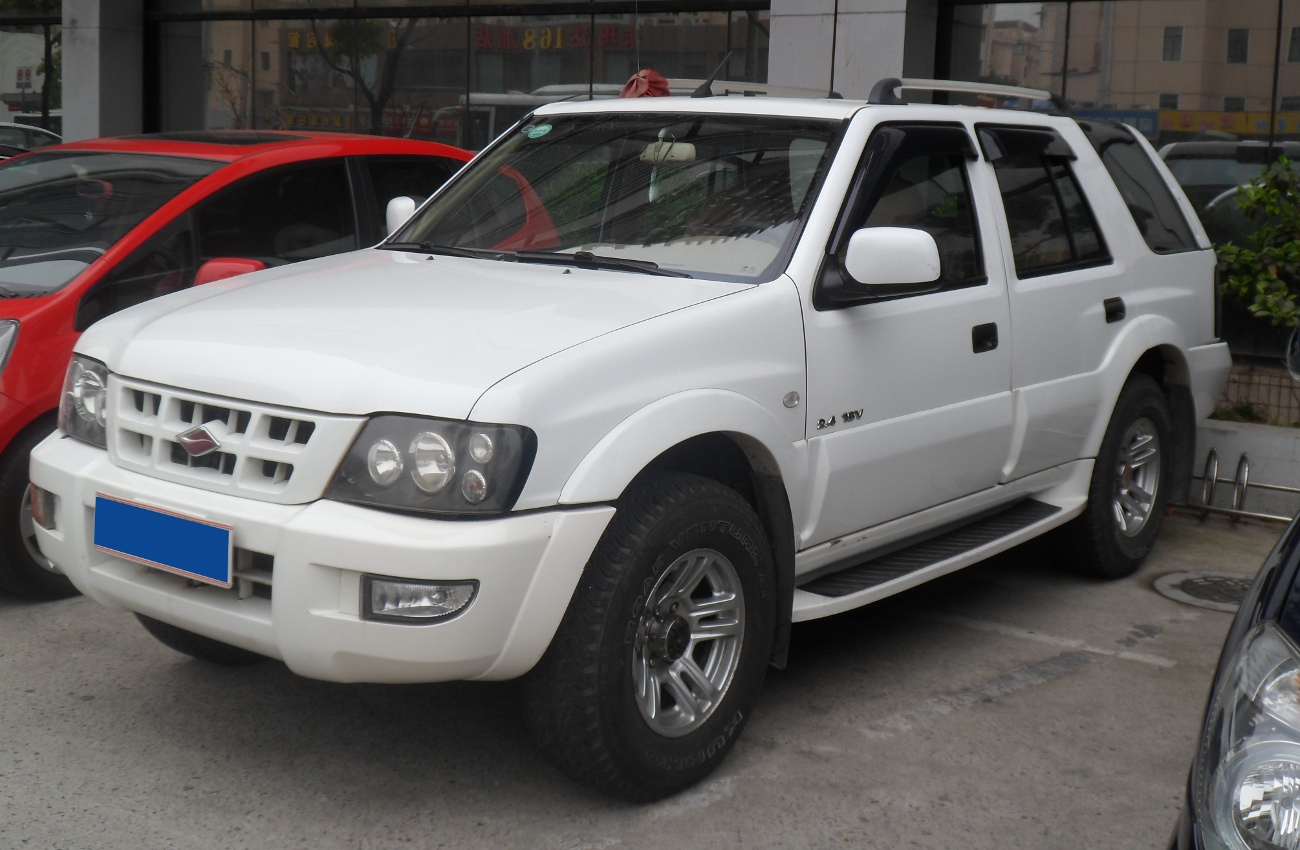
Landwind X6 post-facelift

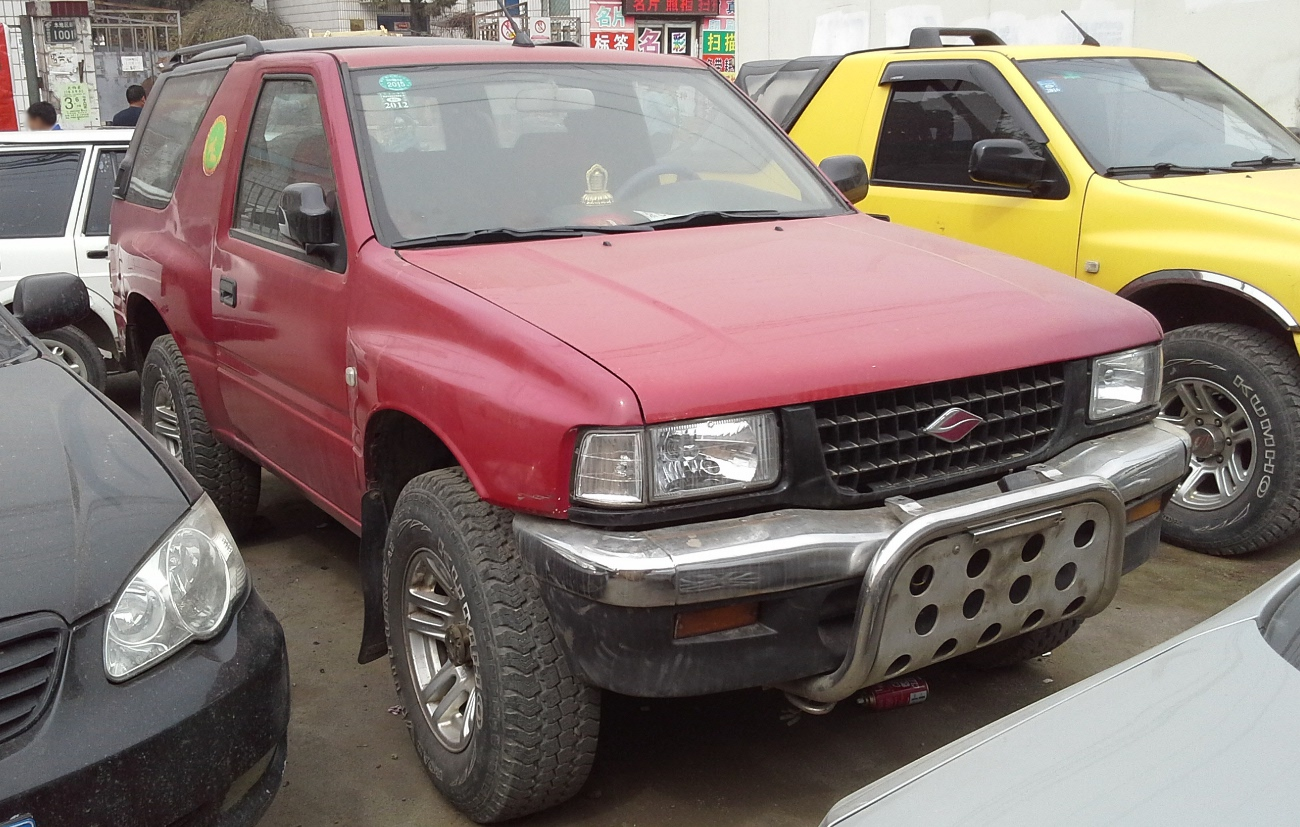
Landwind X9 pre-facelift

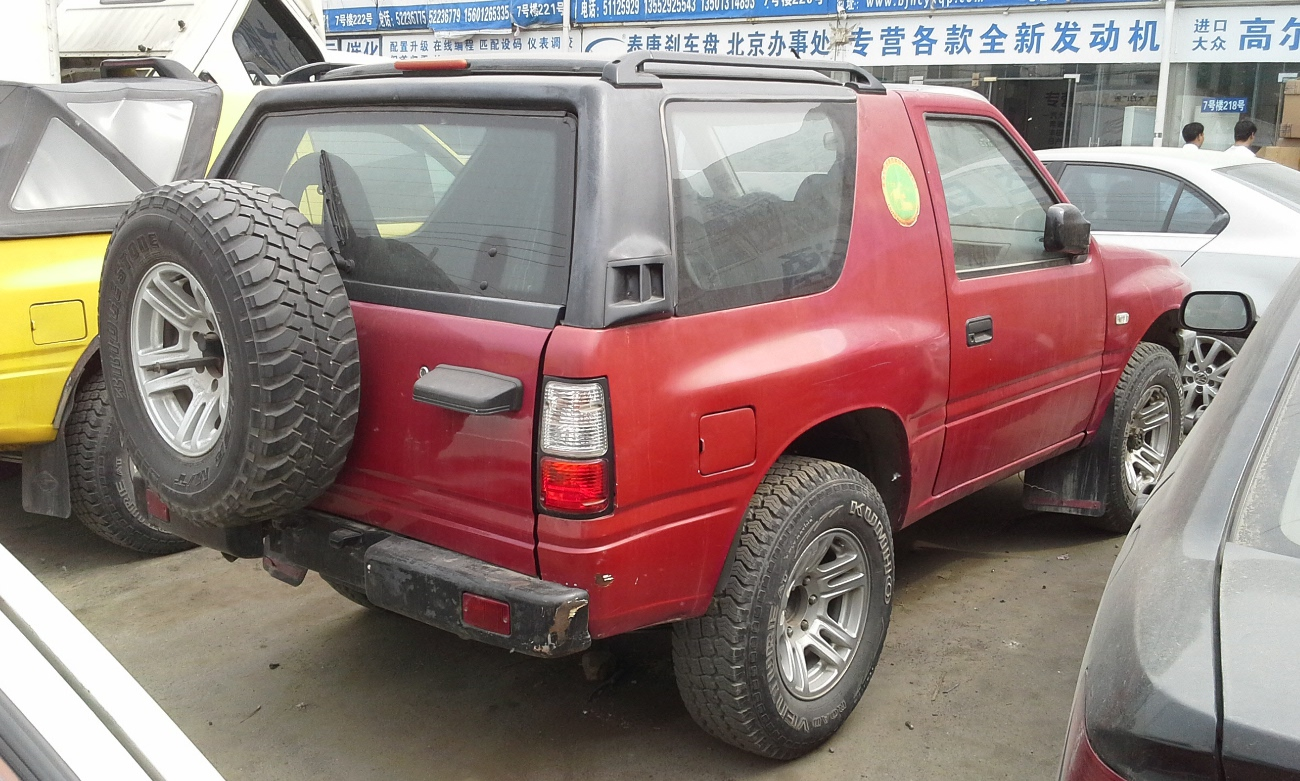
Landwind X9 pre-facelift rear

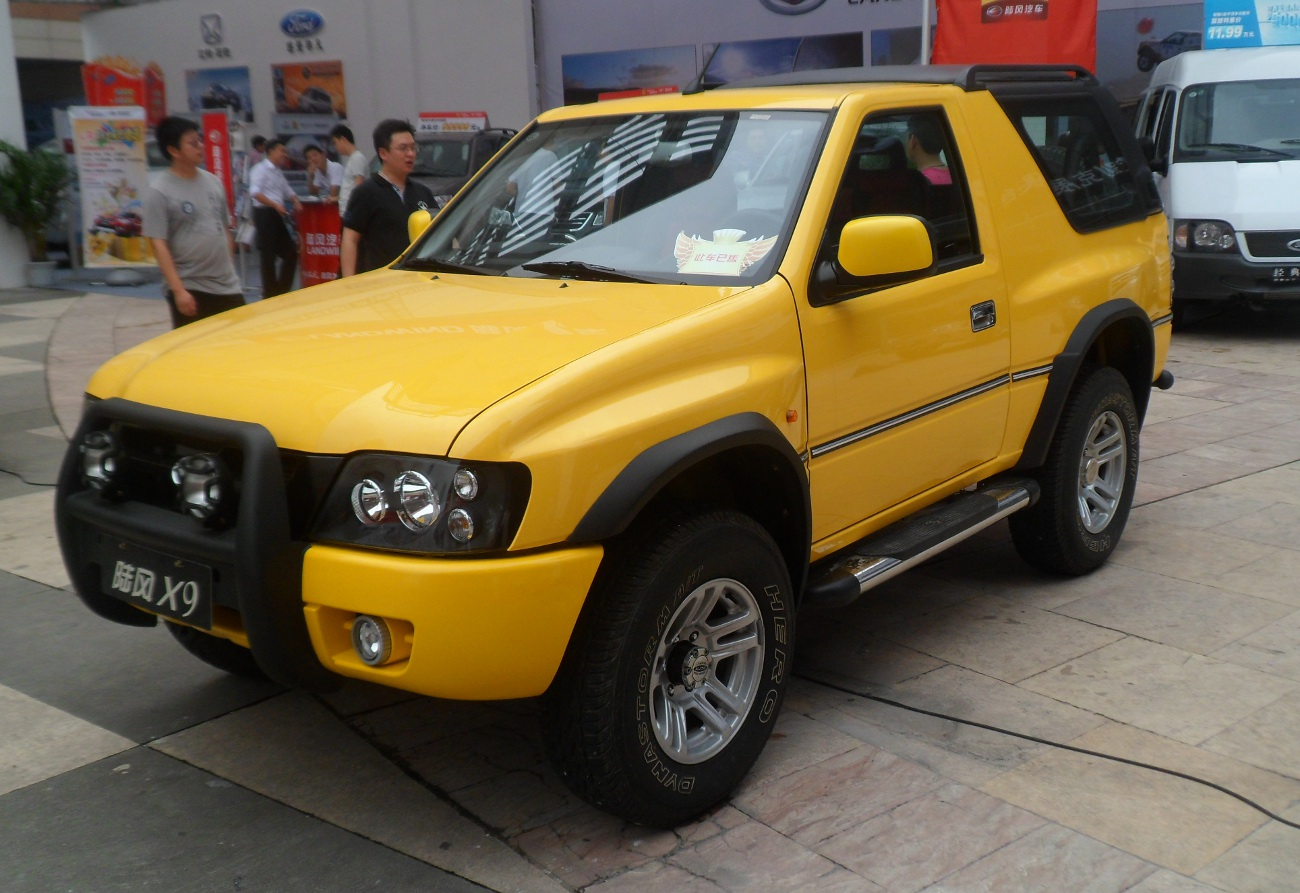
Landwind X9 post-facelift

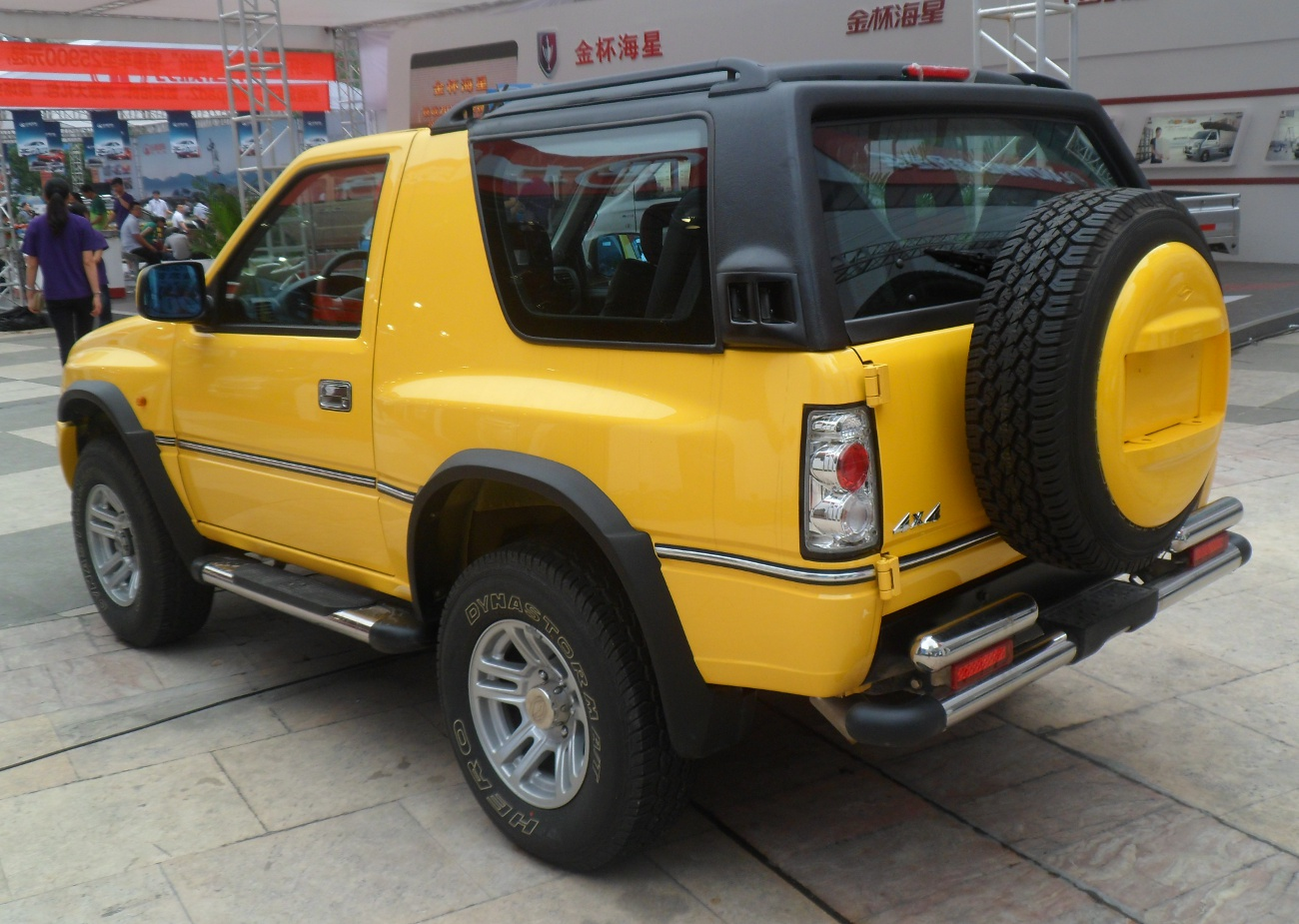
Landwind X9 post-facelift rear

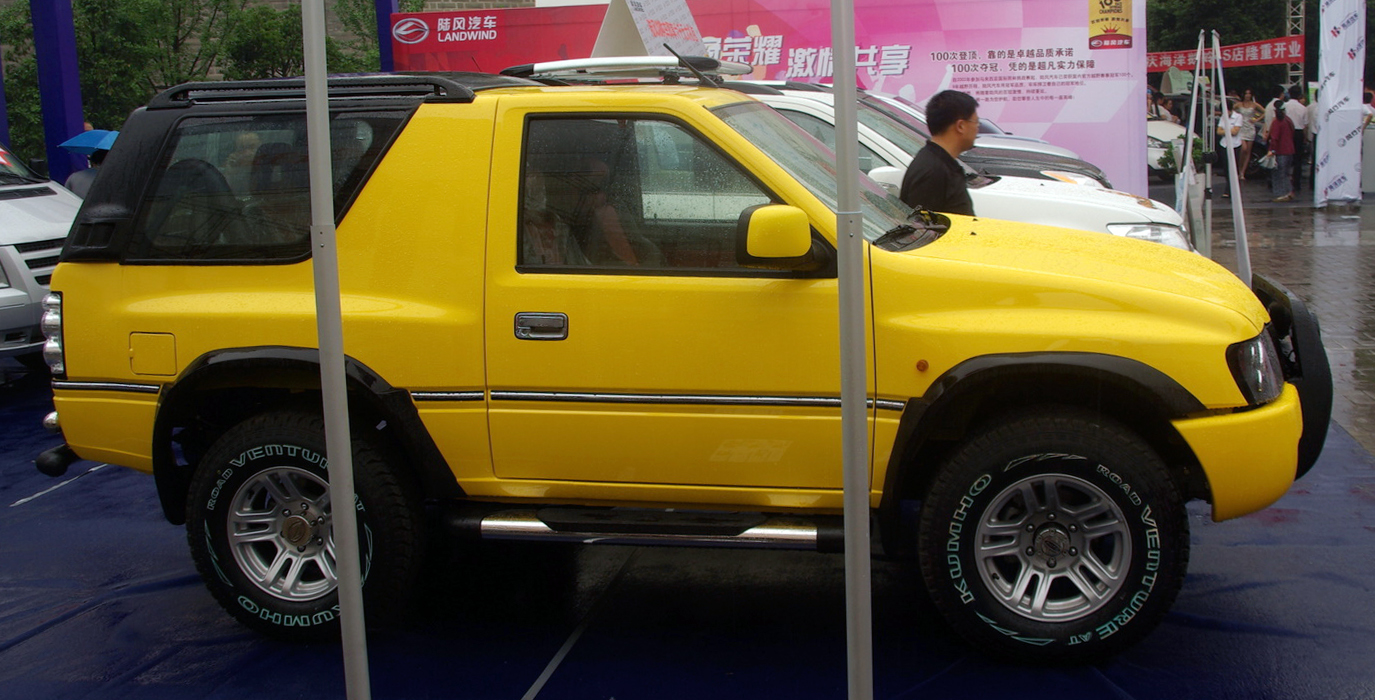
Landwind X9 post-facelift side

=== Engines ===
The European market Landwinds are available with two Mitsubishi-built gasoline-powered engines and one Isuzu-built diesel engine.

- 2.0 L - 115 hp (84 kW)
- 2.4 L - 125 hp (92 kW)
- 2.8 L diesel - 92 hp (68 kW)

The JMC Baodian uses the JX493ZLQ4F engine and the maximum output is 109 hp and the maximum torque is 245 N•m. The only transmission is a five-speed manual gearbox.

=== 2006 Paris Motor Show ===
At the 2006 Paris Motor Show, Landwind displayed an updated version of its SUV, called X-Pedition, as well as an MPV called the Fashion (Landwind CV9) that would compete in the same size class with MPVs such as the Kia Carens.

== JMC variants ==
In China a long wheelbase variant of the SUV is also sold under the name of JMC or Jiangling Baowei and it is also available as a pickup truck called the JMC Baodian.

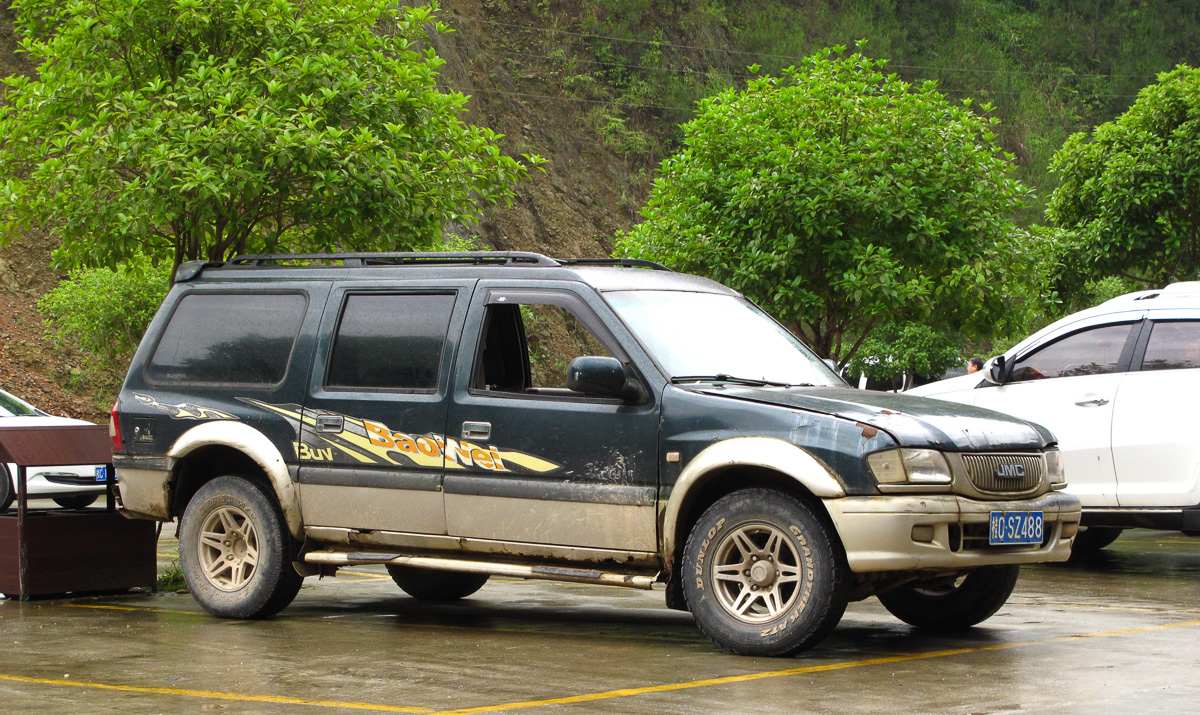
Original pre-facelift JMC Baowei

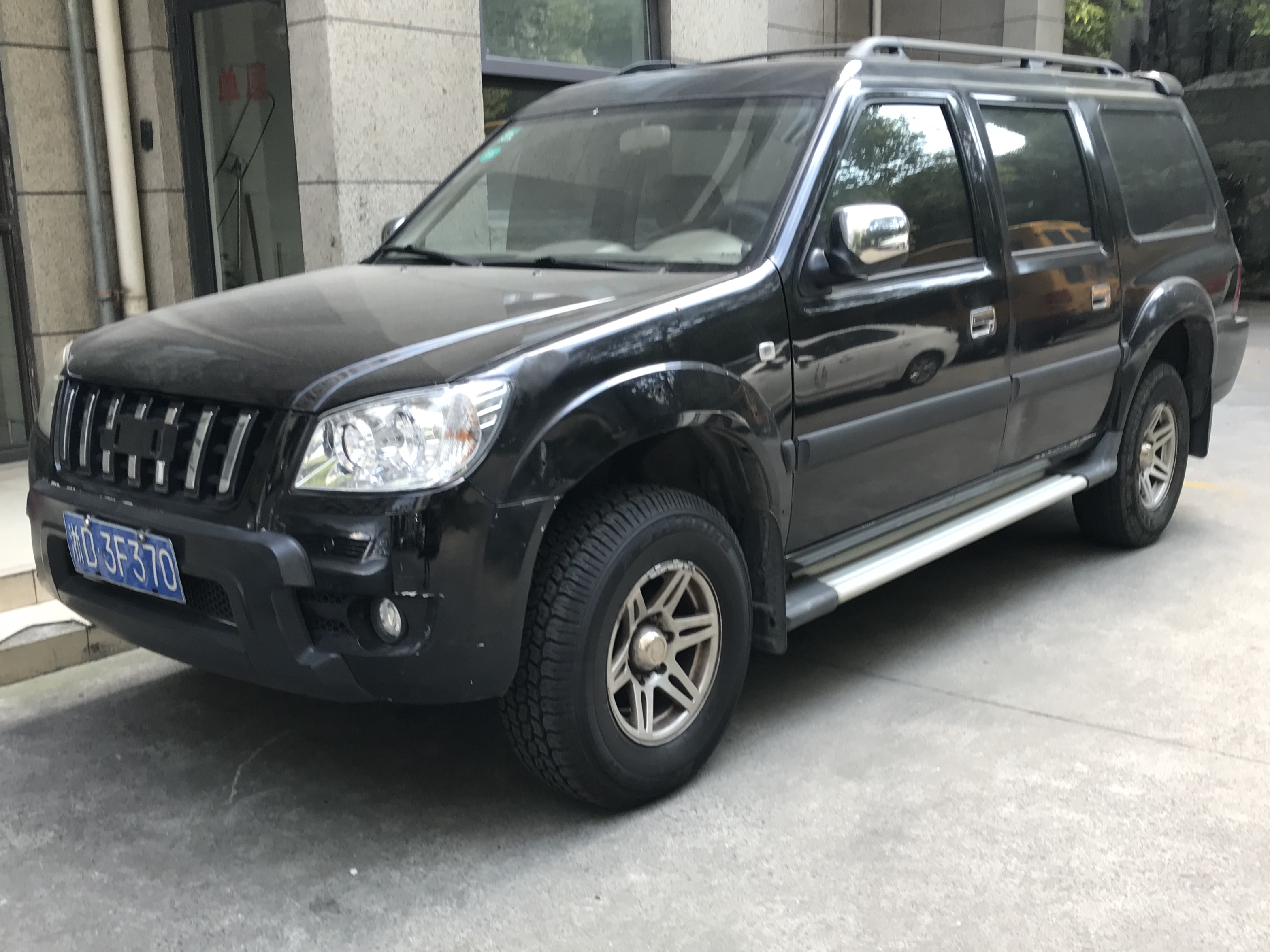
JMC Baowei facelift front

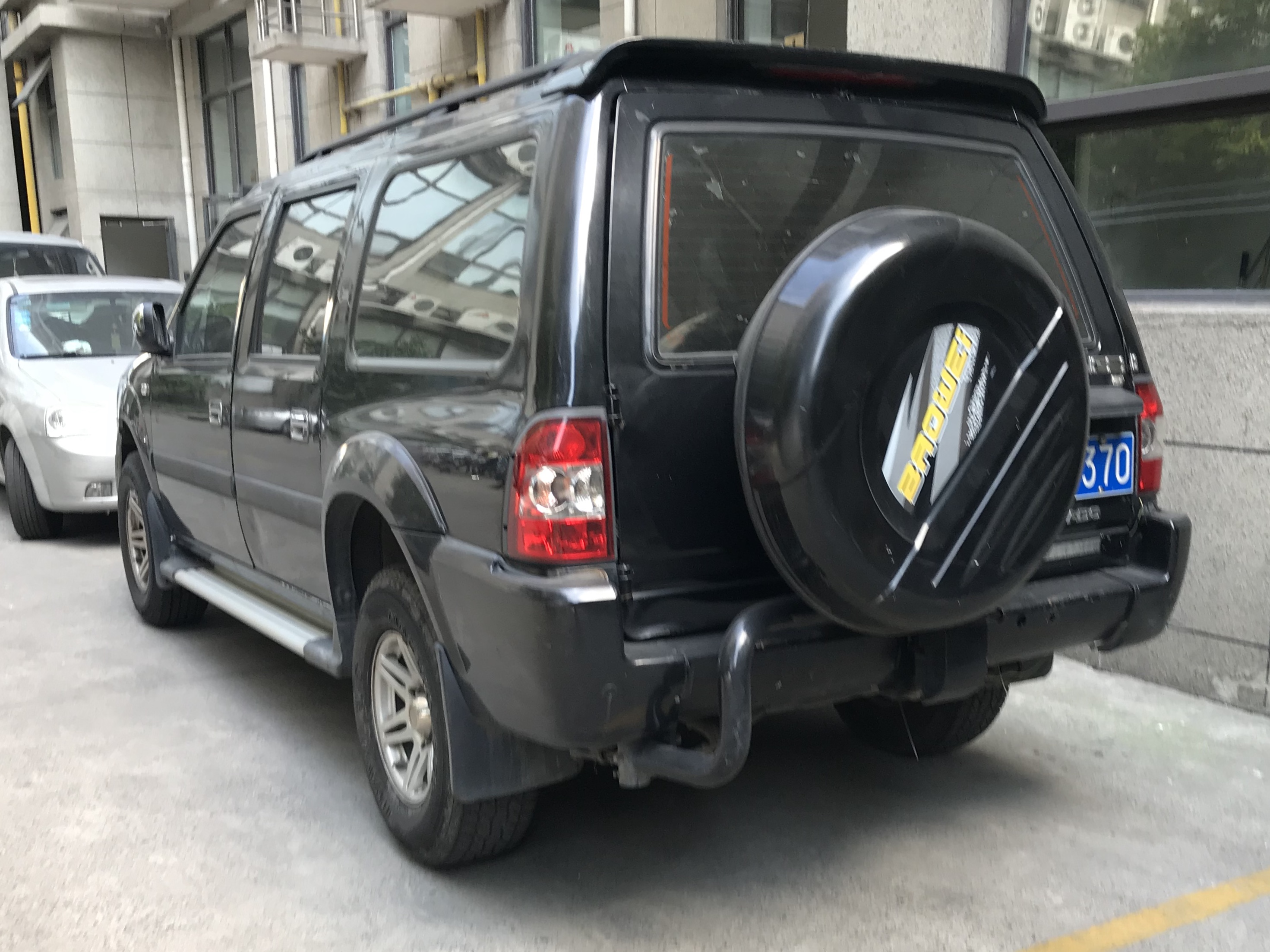
JMC Baowei facelift rear

== Controversy ==
The Landwind has attracted a controversy after a series of safety tests. The car made headlines after German car club ADAC showed in its crash test, carried out for Euro NCAP, that a driver of this vehicle would not survive a head-on collision at 64 km/h (40 MPH).

The Dutch importer of the Landwind called for a test by German safety monitoring agency TÜV to show that the car was in fact safe enough for European standards. These tests are similar to the Euro NCAP tests, but the collision speed is lower at 54 km/h (35 mph). Despite the worst crash results in decades TÜV subsequently confirmed that the Landwind met all mandatory safety criteria according to ECE R94.

The controversy did not end there. Opponents say the TÜV test is not enough to guarantee vehicle safety today. They claim that R94 is outdated and only guarantees that the driver will be alive after a crash, and that it does not take into account serious injuries such as severe crushing of the legs. R94 is also performed at a lower speed.

Ron Zwaans, general director of Landwind Europe, says his company is working together with ADAC to keep improving the Landwind's safety. He claims his goal is to ultimately pass the more rigorous Euro NCAP testing.
