= JMC Yuhu =

Pickup truck

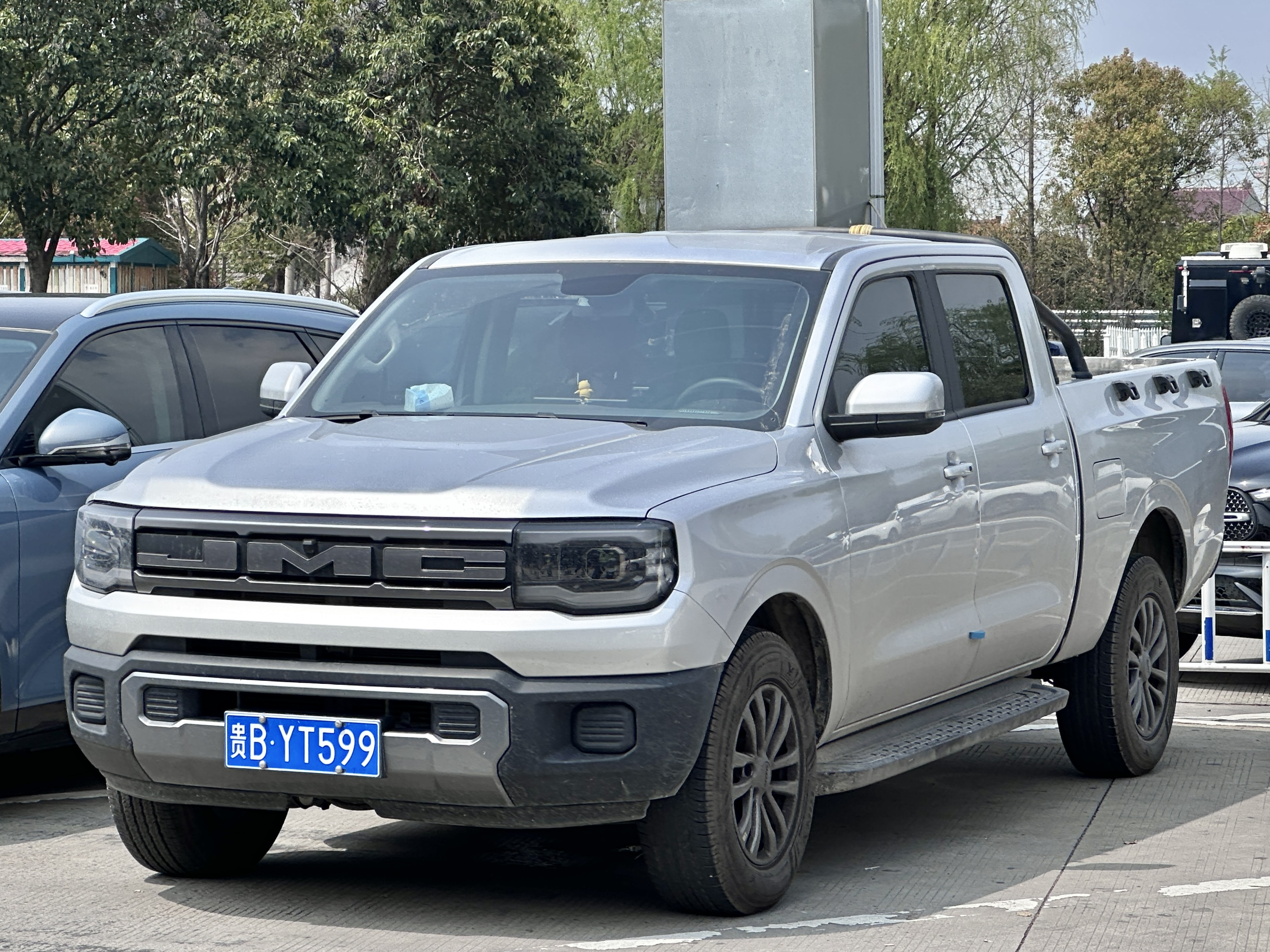

Overview
- Manufacturer: JMC
- Production: 2012–present

Body and chassis
- Class: Mid-size pickup truck
- Body style: 2-door single cab; 2-door extended cab; 4-door double cab
- Layout: Front-engine, rear-wheel drive/four-wheel drive

Chronology
- Predecessor: JMC Baodian (first generation)

The JMC Yuhu (江铃域虎) is a mid-size pickup truck produced by Jiangling Motors for the Chinese market. The model was also sold as the second generation Boarding or Baodian (宝典）in several markets and is also the successor of several variants of the JMC Baodian. The Yuhu later spawned a few variants that was sold alongside each other including the regular Baodian, the Yuhu 3 and Yuhu 5.

== First generation (2012) ==
JMC Yuhu 域虎
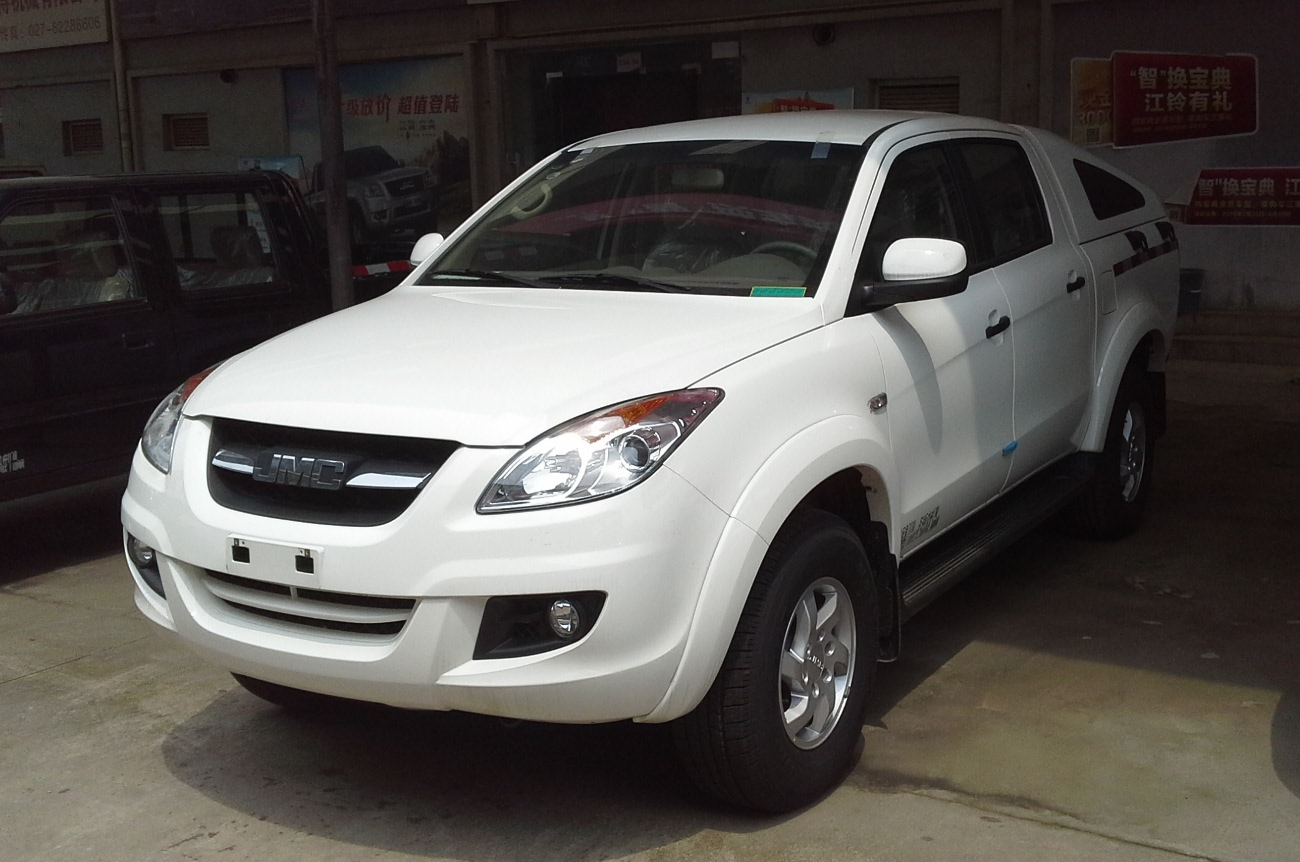

Overview
- Also called: JMC Vigus (Australia & Philippines); JMC Vigus Pro (Malaysia); JMC Boarding; JMC Vigor (Philippines, 2012–2018); AmberTruck Work (Russia)
- Production: 2012–present
- Assembly: China: Nanchang, Jiangxi; Philippines: Santa Rosa, Laguna (Jiangling-DreamCo)

Body and chassis
- Layout: Front-engine, rear-wheel-drive or four-wheel-drive
- Platform: N350 platform
- Related: Yusheng S350

Powertrain
- Engine: 2.0 L 4G20 turbo I4 (petrol); 2.4 L 4G69 I4 (petrol); 2.4 L 4D24 turbo I4 (diesel)
- Transmission: 6-speed manual 5-speed manual 6-speed automatic 8-speed automatic ZF 8HP

Dimensions
- Wheelbase: 3,085 mm (121.5 in)
- Length: 5,222 mm (205.6 in)
- Width: 1,828 mm (72.0 in)
- Height: 1,710 mm (67 in)
- Curb weight: 2,580 kg (5,688 lb)

The JMC Yuhu pickup shares similar exterior design elements with the Ford Ranger and Mazda BT-50, but it is built on Jiangling's own platform.

During the 2015 Shanghai Motor Show, Jiangling Motors showed off an off-road coupé utility concept version of the pickup with cooperation with Ford.

Jiangling entered the Australian market in 2016, and the truck is the first model sold under the name JMC Vigus. Jiangling left the Australian market in 2018 due to poor sales of the Vigus.

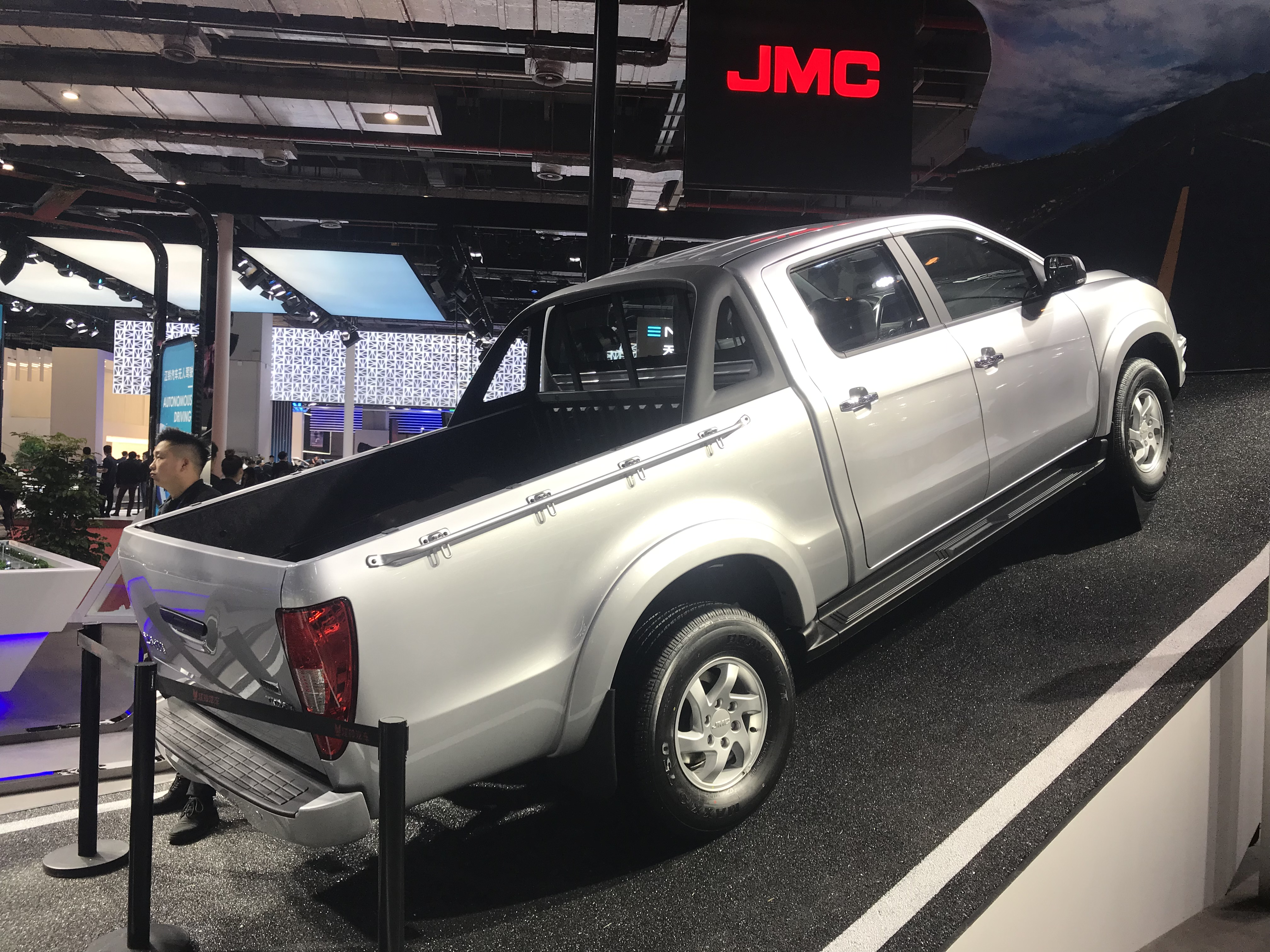
Rear view

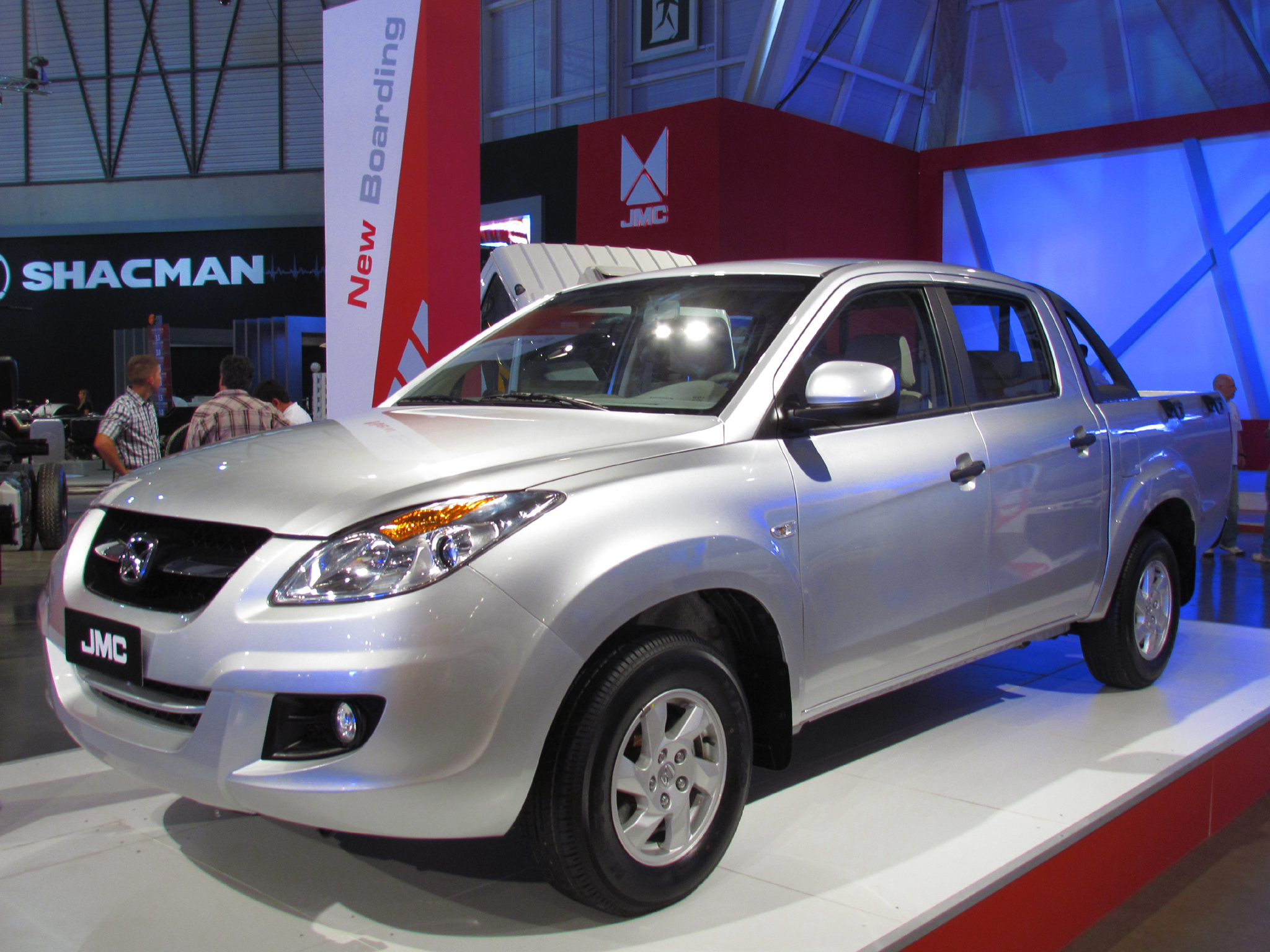
JMC Boarding in oversea markets

=== JMC Baodian ===
In August 2020, a Yuhu-based Baodian positioning as an entry-level model of the Yuhu range was launched and is aimed to replace the aging Baodian pickup. The model offers a selection of rear-wheel-drive and four-wheel-drive models with engine options of a 2.5-liter diesel turbo engine and a 1.8-liter petrol turbo engine. There are up to 16 trim levels available.

In January 2023, the Yuhu-based second generation Baodian received a facelift for the 2023 model year featuring a styling update, while the powertrain remains as the same 2.5-liter diesel turbo engine and a 1.8-liter petrol turbo engines.

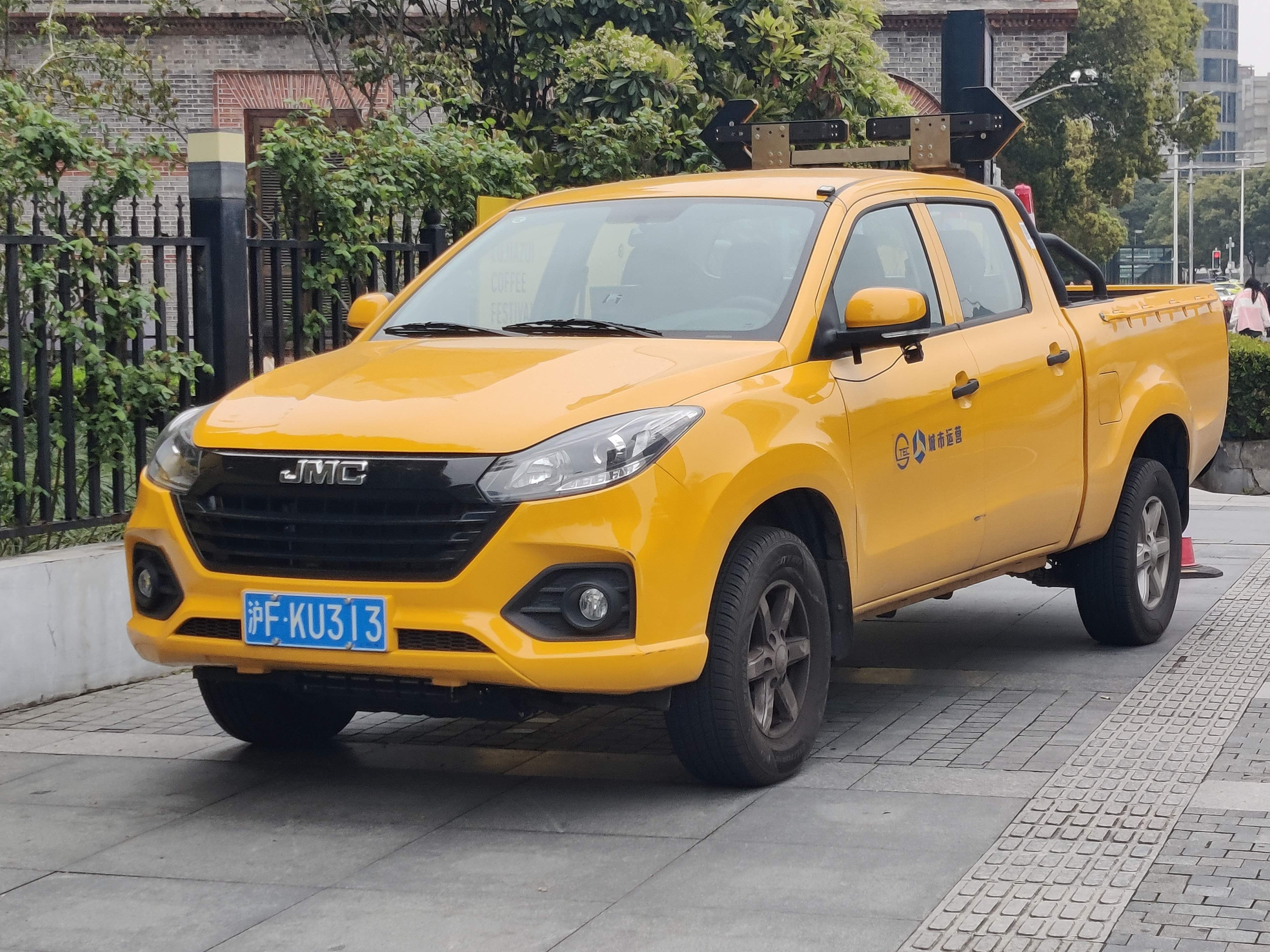
JMC Baodian II

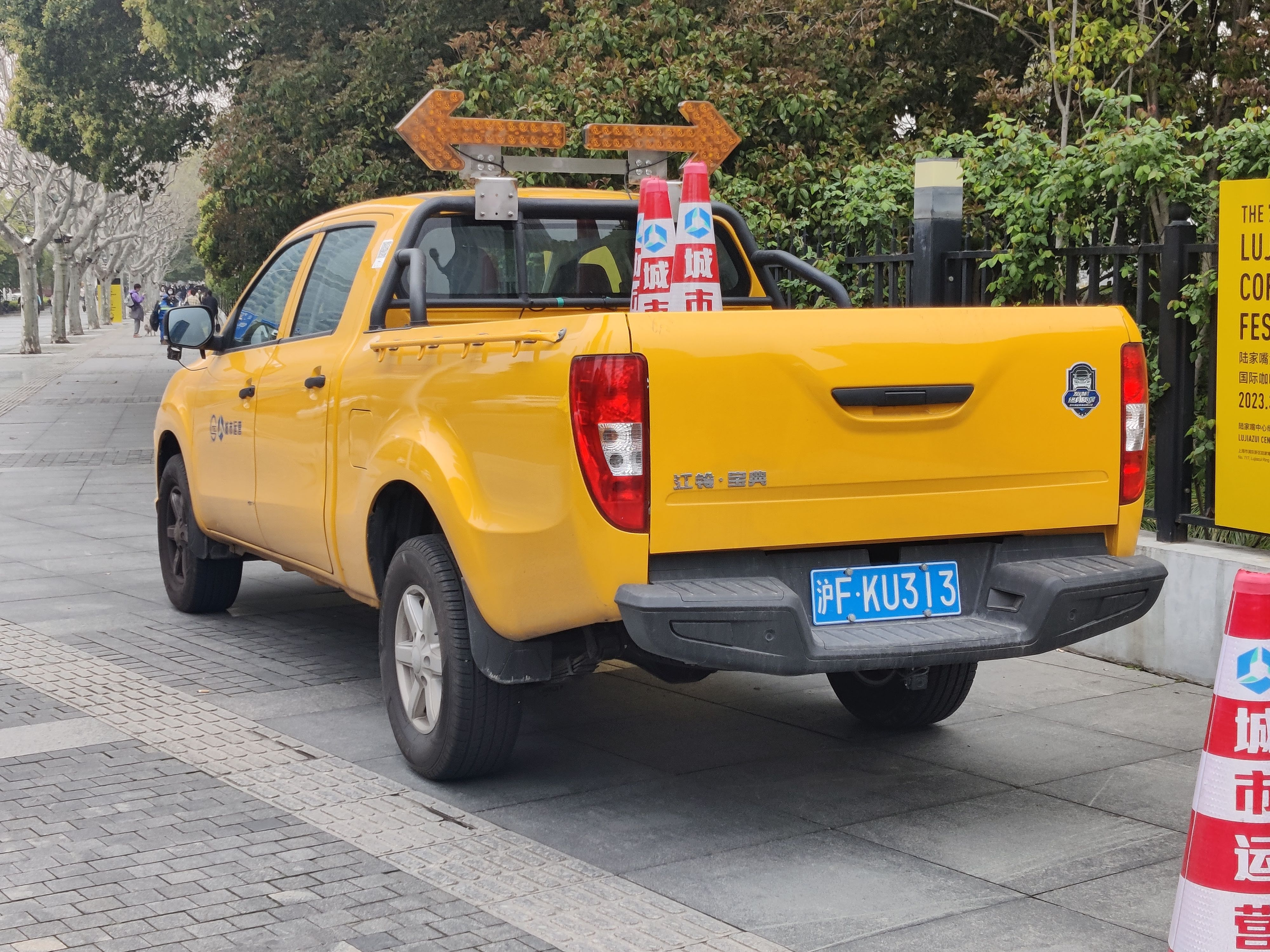
Rear view

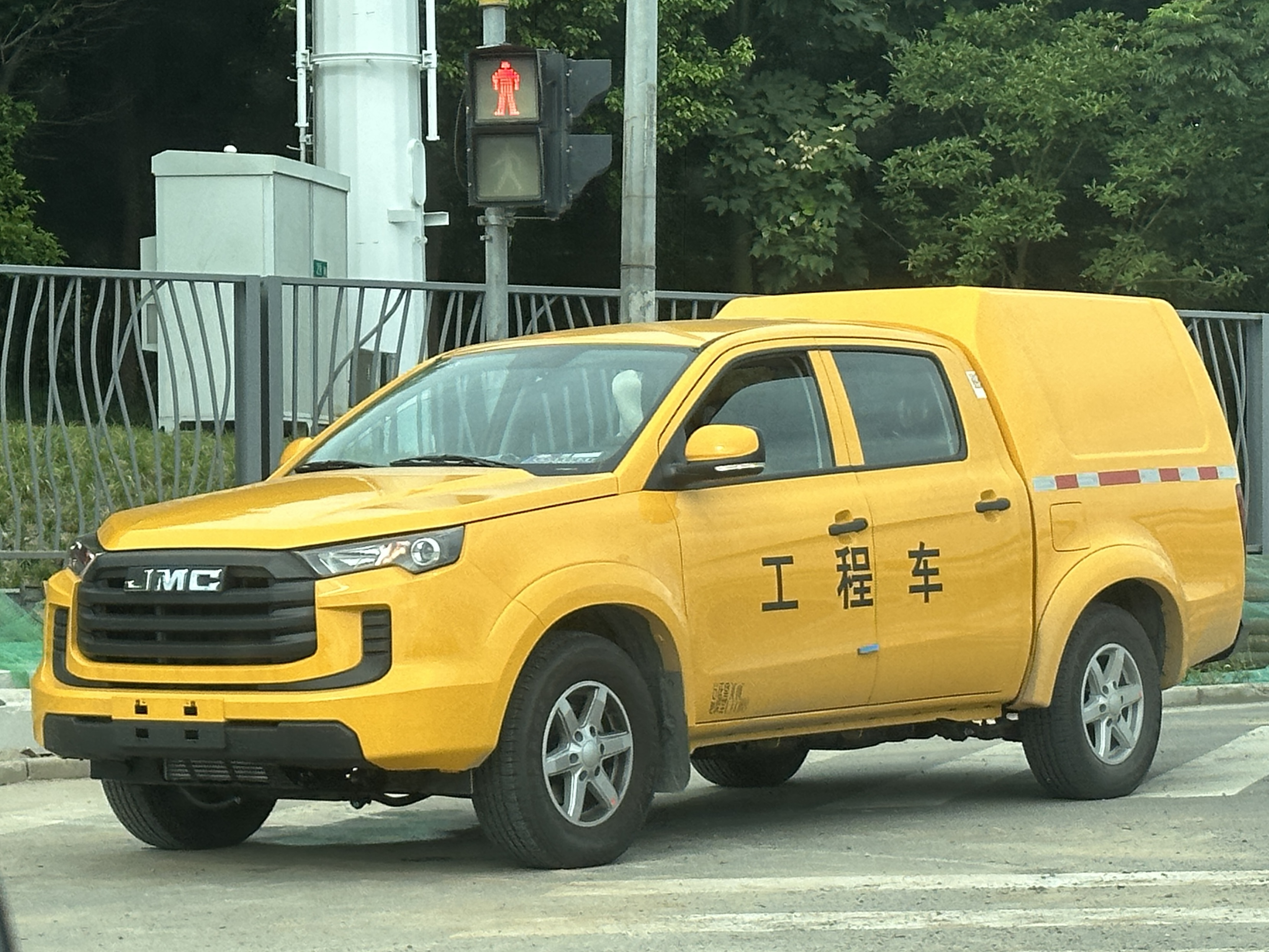
JMC Baodian II 2023MY

=== JMC Yuhu 3 and Yuhu 5 ===
The Yuhu 3 and Yuhu 5 are variants of the JMC Yuhu positioned under the more up market Yuhu 7 pickup. The Yuhu 3 and Yuhu 5 feature slightly different front bumper designs and are priced differently. The Yuhu 3 offer a selection of rear wheel drive and four wheel drive models with engine options of a 2.5 liter diesel turbo engine and a 1.8 liter petrol turbo engine, while the Yuhu 5 offer a selection of rear wheel drive and four wheel drive models with engine options of a 2.4 liter diesel turbo engine and a 2.0 liter diesel turbo engine.

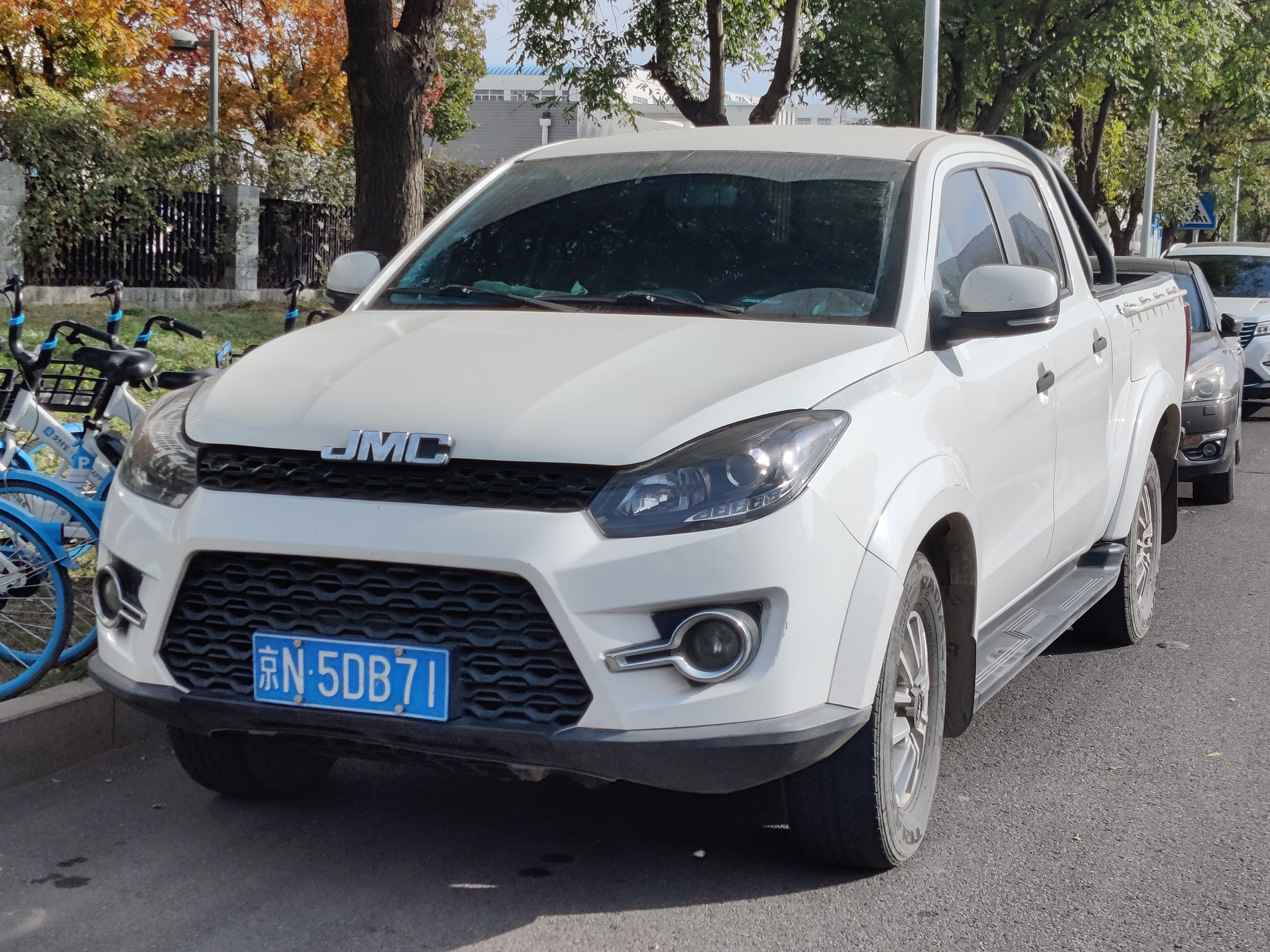
JMC Yuhu 3

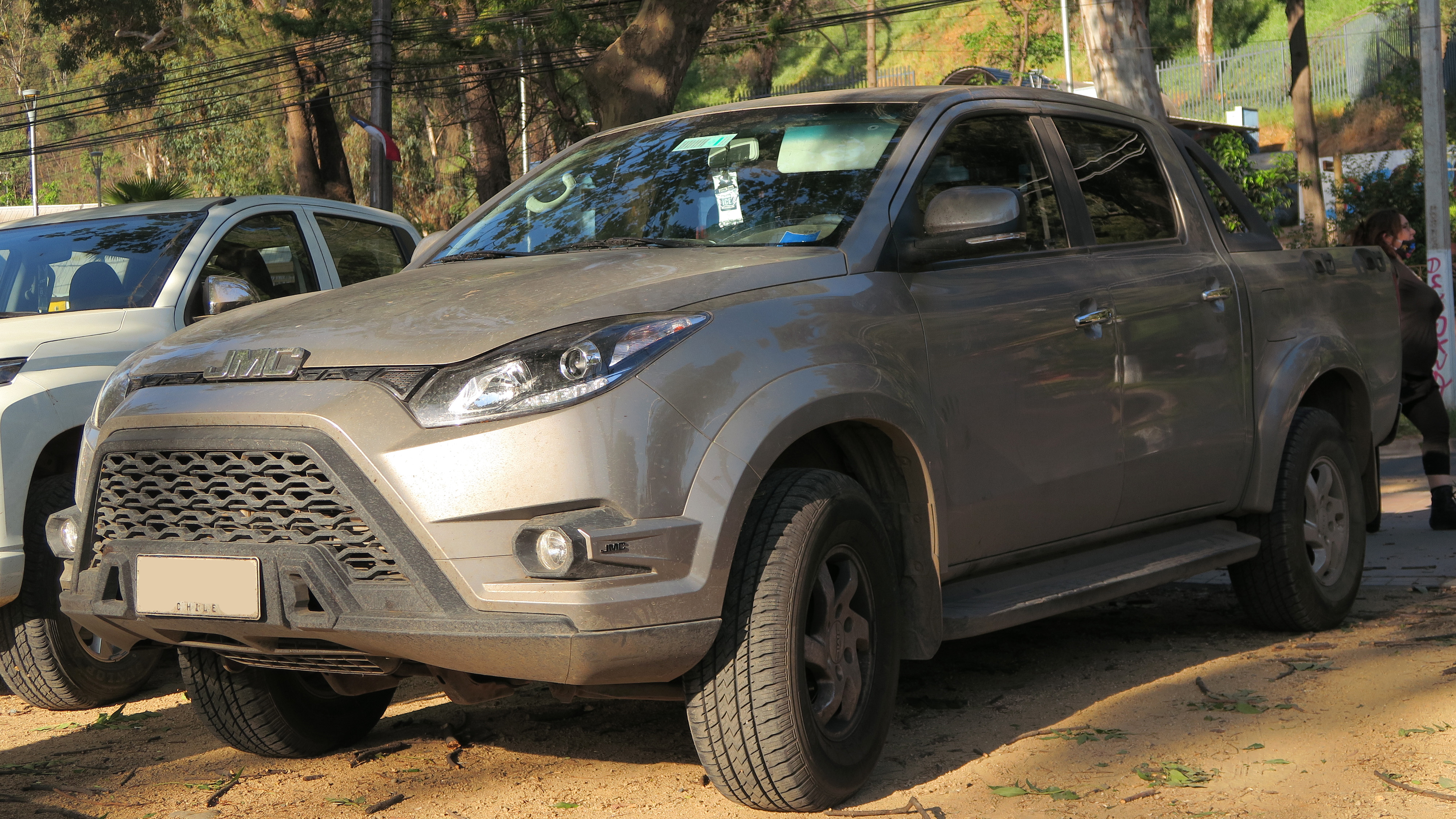
JMC Vigus (sold as the Yuhu 5 in China)

== Second generation (2025) ==
JMC Yuhu II
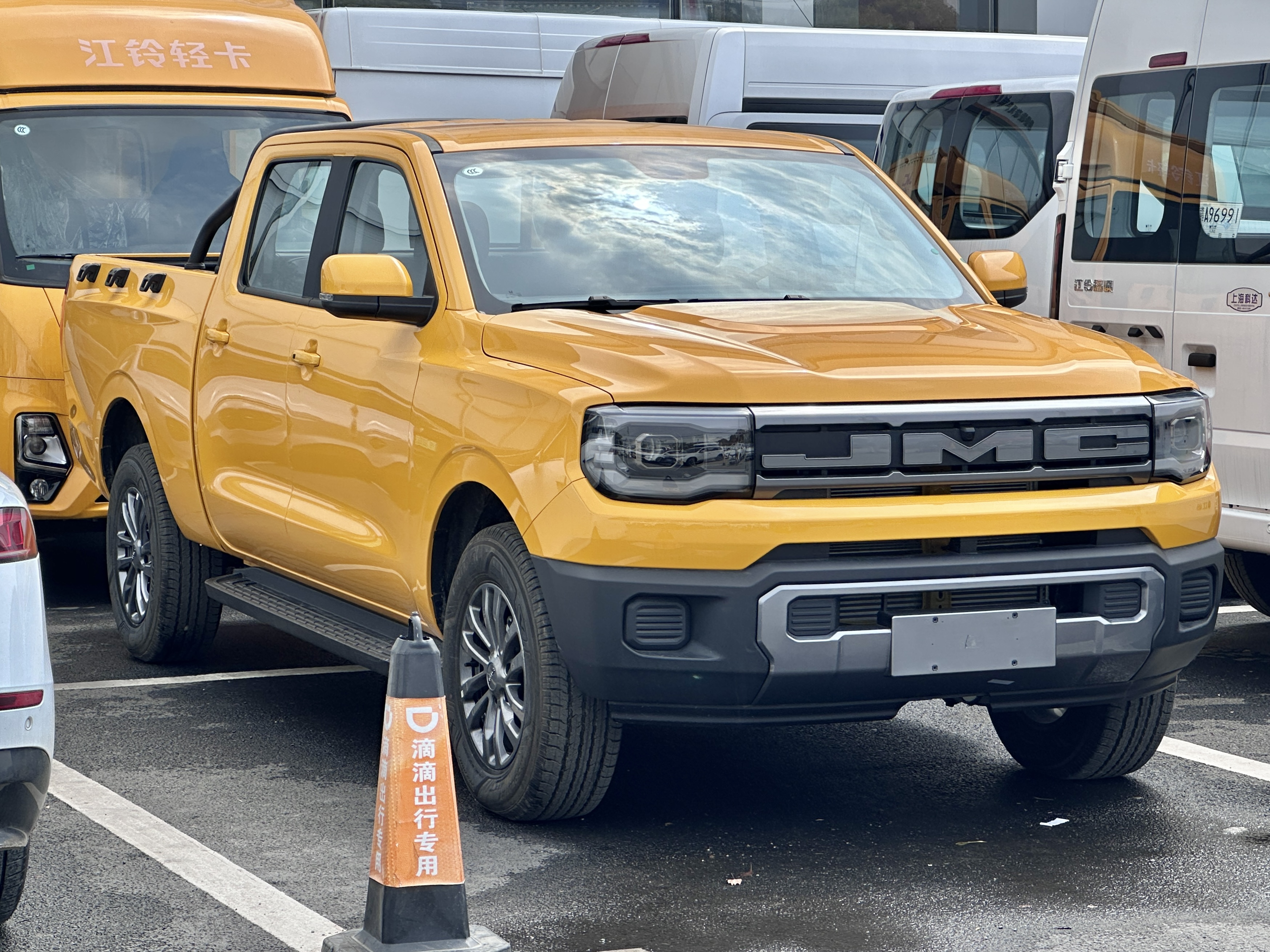

Overview
- Production: 2025–present
- Assembly: China: Nanchang, Jiangxi

Body and chassis
- Layout: Front-engine, rear-wheel-drive Front-engine, four-wheel-drive
- Related: JMC Baodian (third generation)

Powertrain
- Engine: Diesel: 2.5 L NB25A6L turbodiesel I4
- Transmission: 5-speed manual transmission 8-speed automatic transmission

Dimensions
- Wheelbase: 124 in (3,150 mm); 135 in (3,440 mm) (LWB)
- Length: 210 in (5,322 mm); 221 in (5,612 mm) (LWB)
- Width: 74 in (1,882 mm)
- Height: 73 in (1,852 mm)

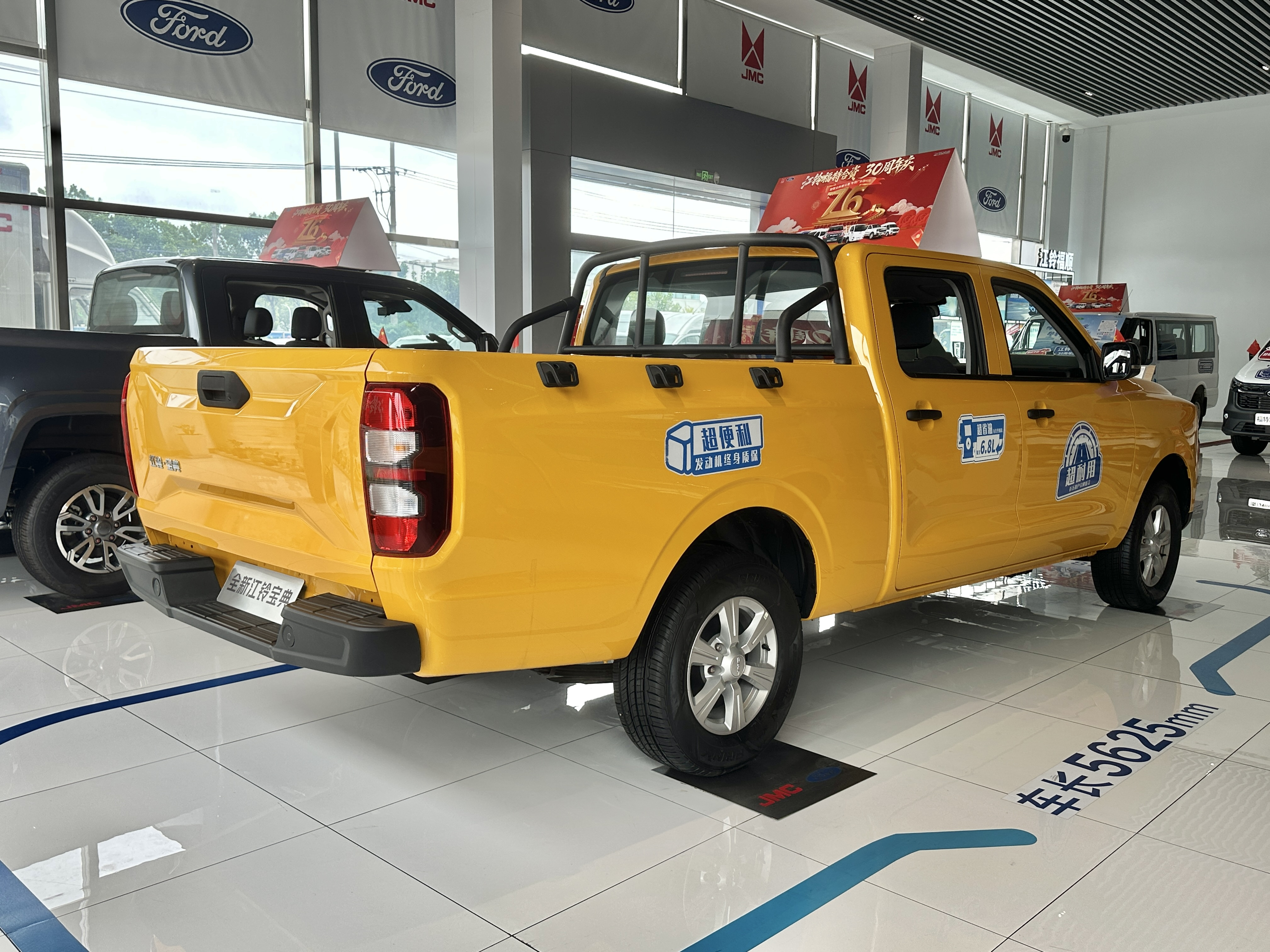
Rear view

A second generation JMC Yuhu was launched in May 2025 sharing the platform with the third generation JMC Baodian. Compared to the Baodian, the front end is restyled resulting in a shorter vehicle length. The Yuhu also features more premium options and resulting in a higher price tag positioned above the Baodian. The only engine option is the 2.5 liter turbo-diesel inline-4 shared with the third generation Yuhu, while transmission options are the same 5-speed manual transmission and 8-speed automatic transmission.
