= JMC Baodian =

Pickup truck

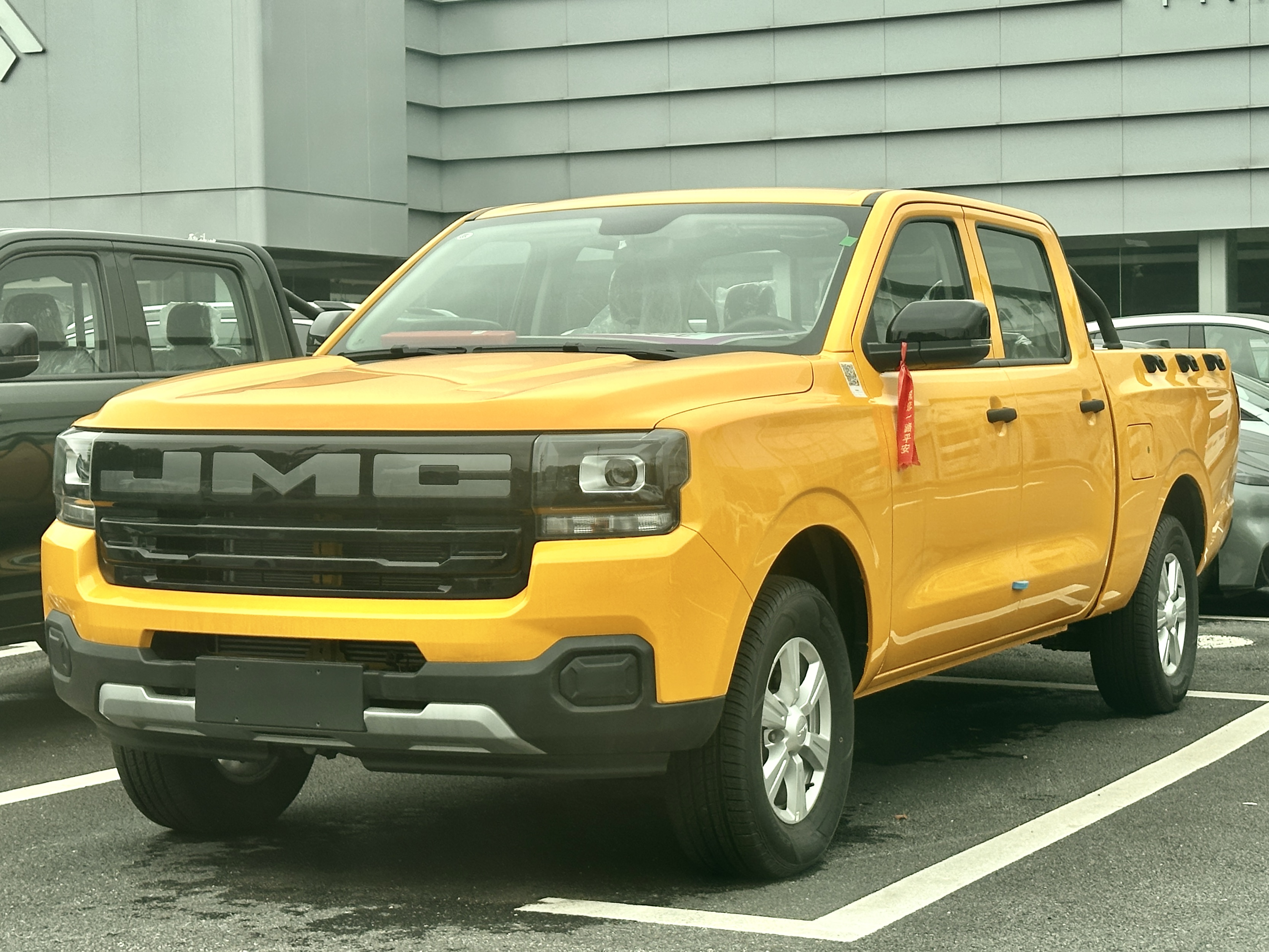

Overview
- Manufacturer: JMC
- Also called: JMC Boarding; JMC Hunter (Philippines)
- Production: 1993–present

Body and chassis
- Class: Compact pickup truck (1993–2016); Mid-size pickup truck (2020–)
- Body style: 4-door pickup truck
- Layout: Front-engine, rear-wheel-drive; Front-engine, four-wheel-drive
- Chassis: Body-on-frame

The JMC Baodian (Chinese: 宝典) is a nameplate used for JMC entry level pickup trucks. The original Baodian pickup is based on the platform of the Isuzu Faster, also known as the Rodeo or TF, a mid-size pickup truck. JMC began manufacturing this platform through a joint venture with Isuzu in 1993.

Over the years, the Baodian name was continued with updated models, and its lineage continues in some later vehicles. The JMC Yuhu, for example, is the successor to the Baodian, and for a time, a version of the Yuhu was also sold as a second-generation Baodian.

== First generation (1993–2016) ==
The first generation started out as a rebadged Isuzu Faster. The JMC Baodian uses the JX493ZLQ4F engine and the maximum output is 109 hp (81 kW) and the maximum torque is 245 N⋅m (181 lb⋅ft). The only transmission is a five-speed manual gearbox.

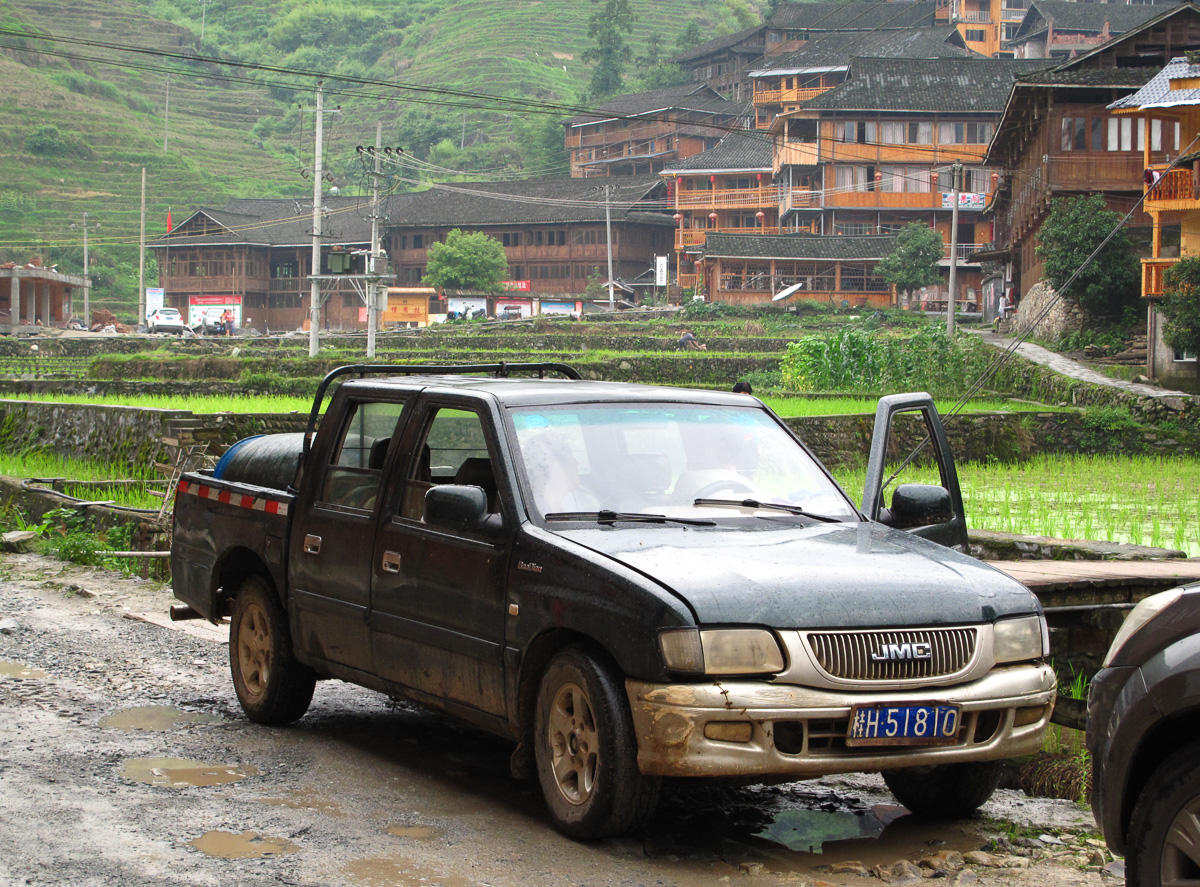
Original pre-facelift JMC Baodian

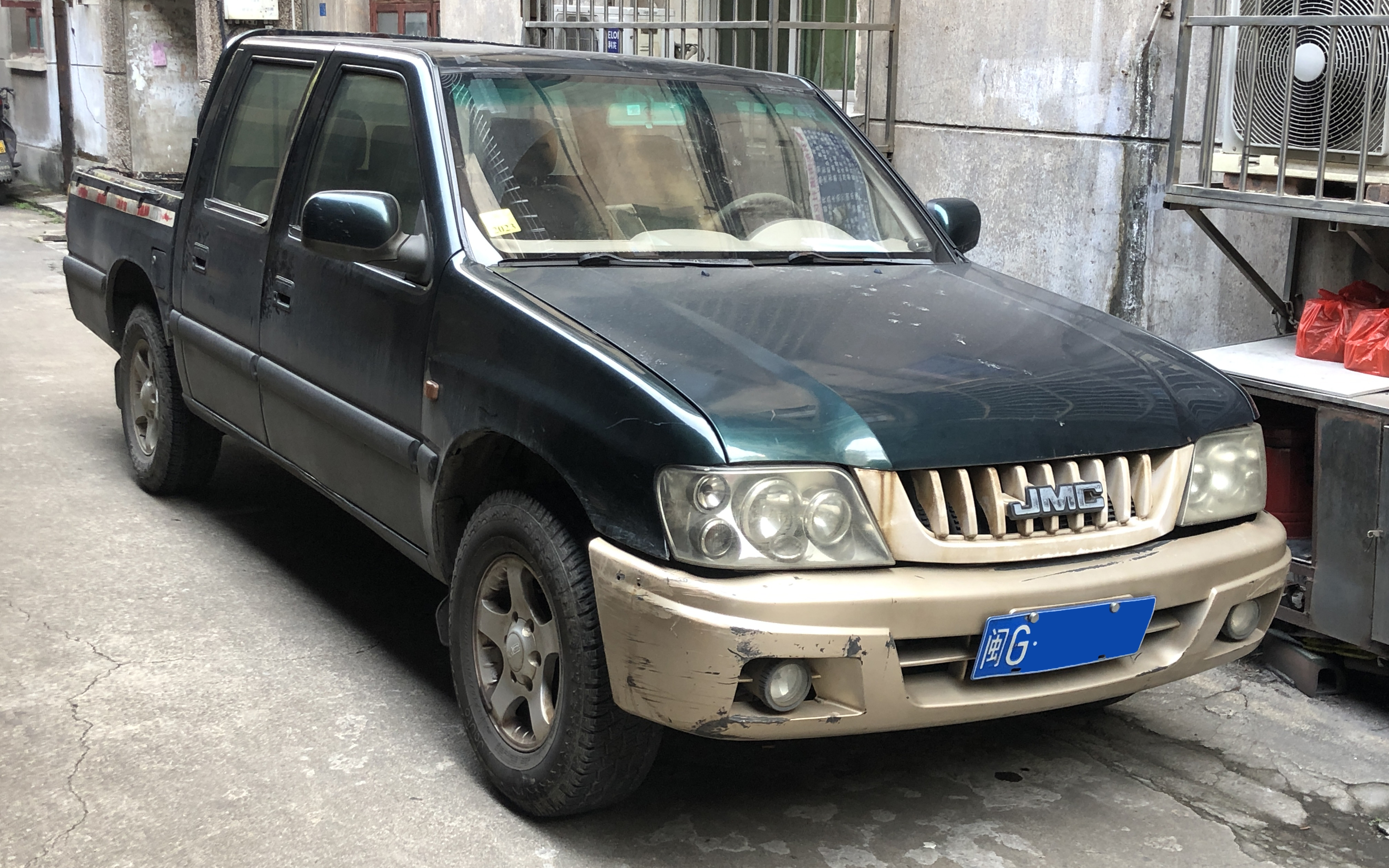
JMC Baodian first facelift (front)

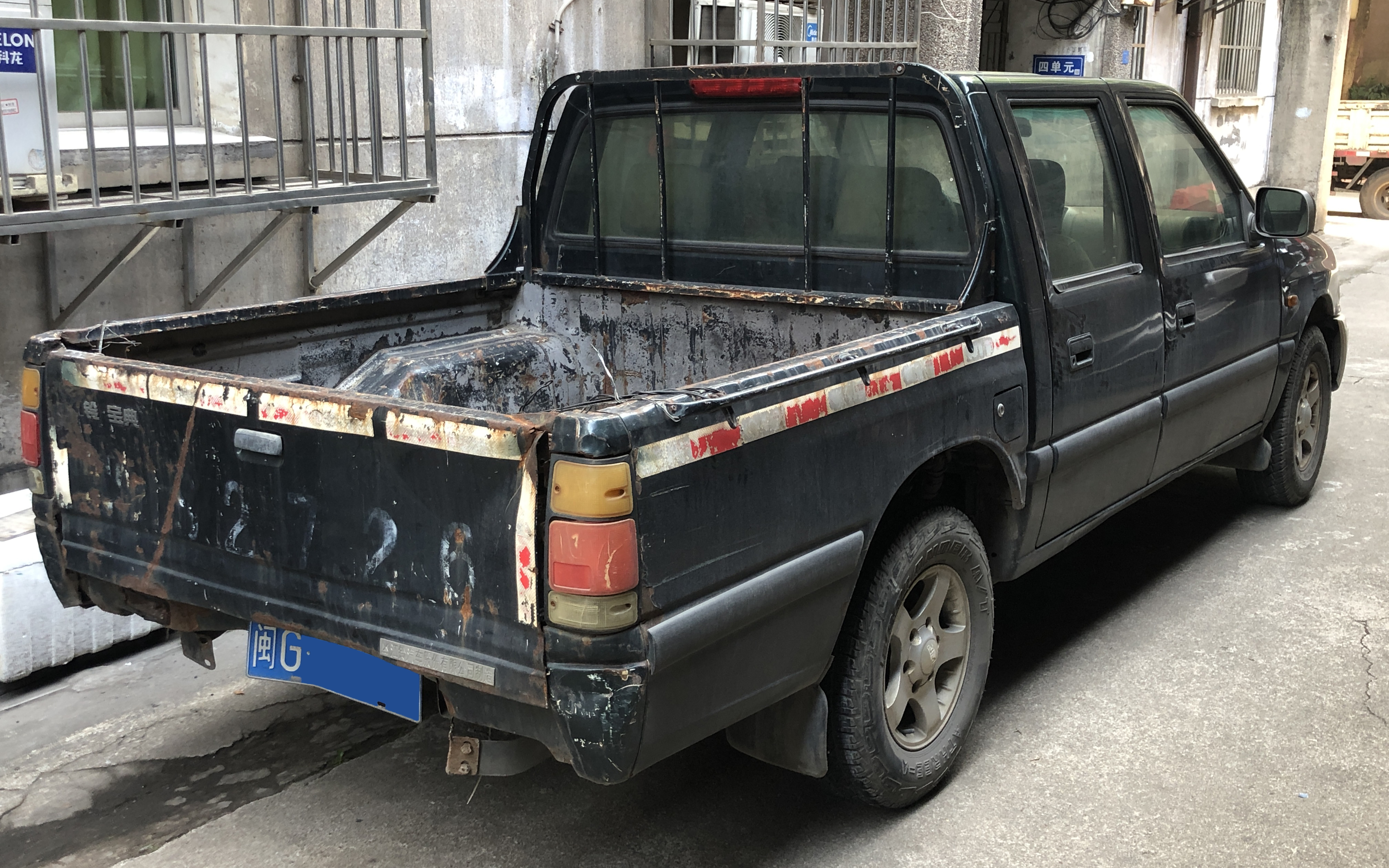
JMC Baodian first facelift (rear)

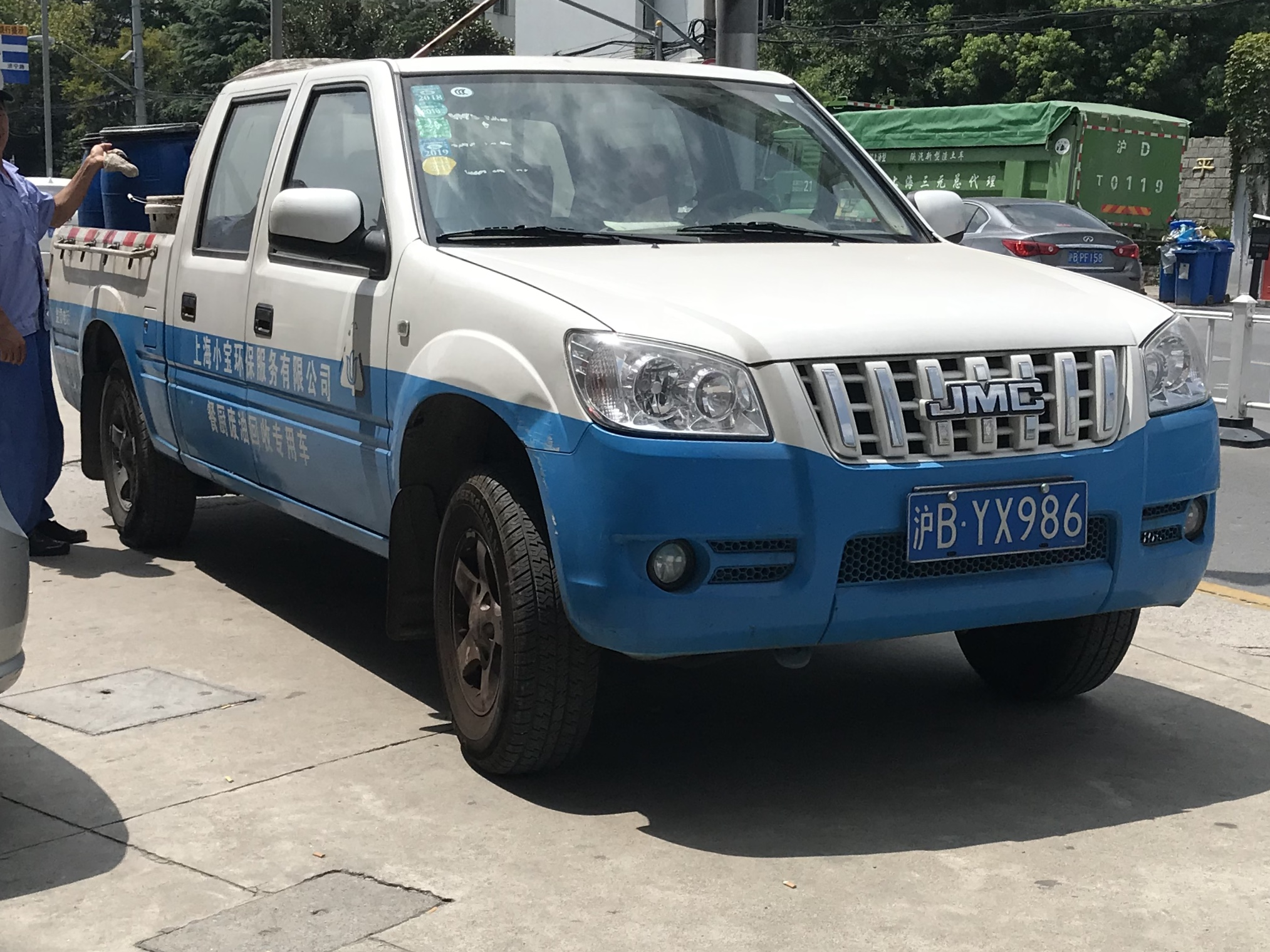
JMC Baodian second facelift (front)

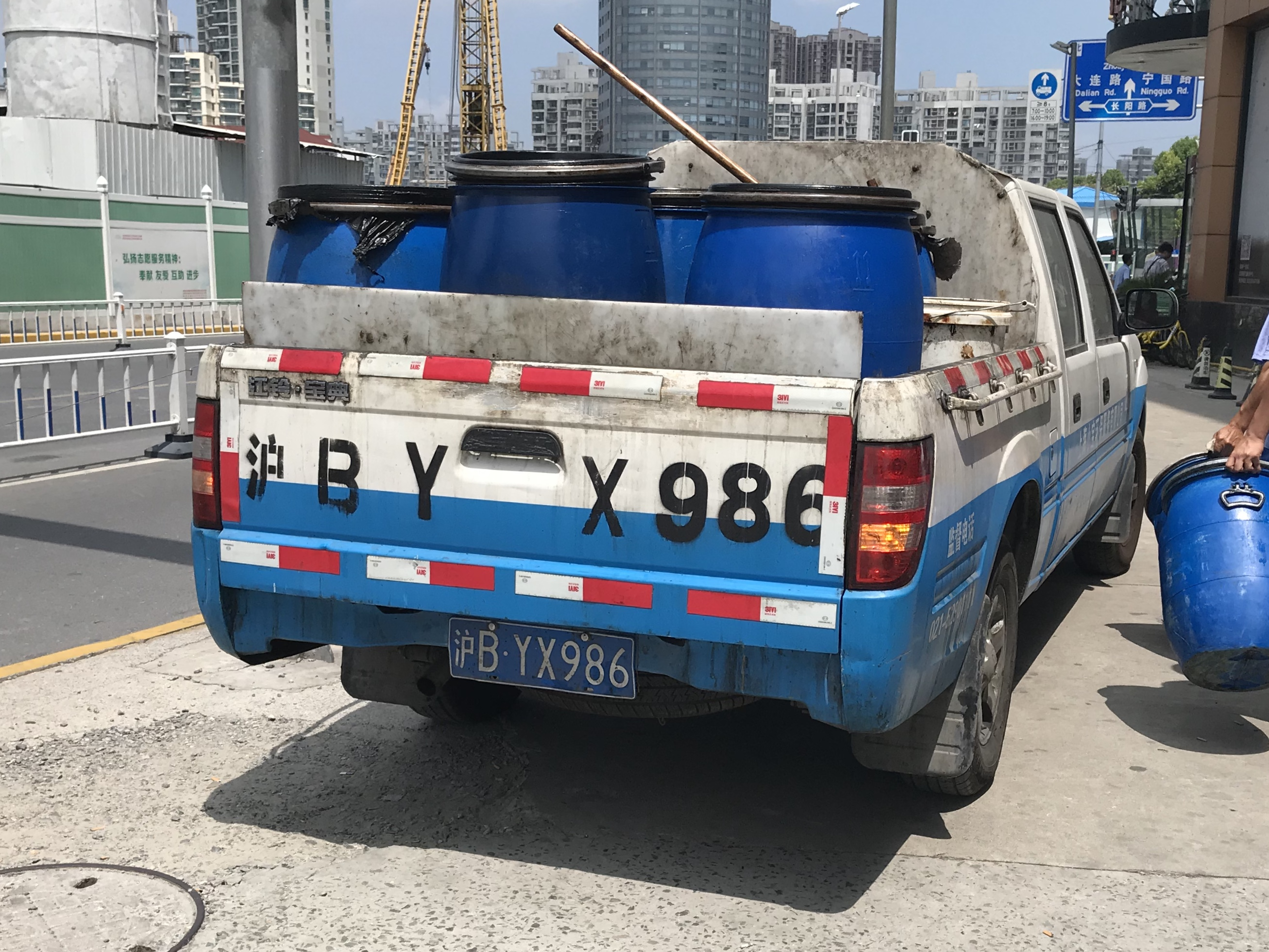
JMC Baodian second facelift (rear)

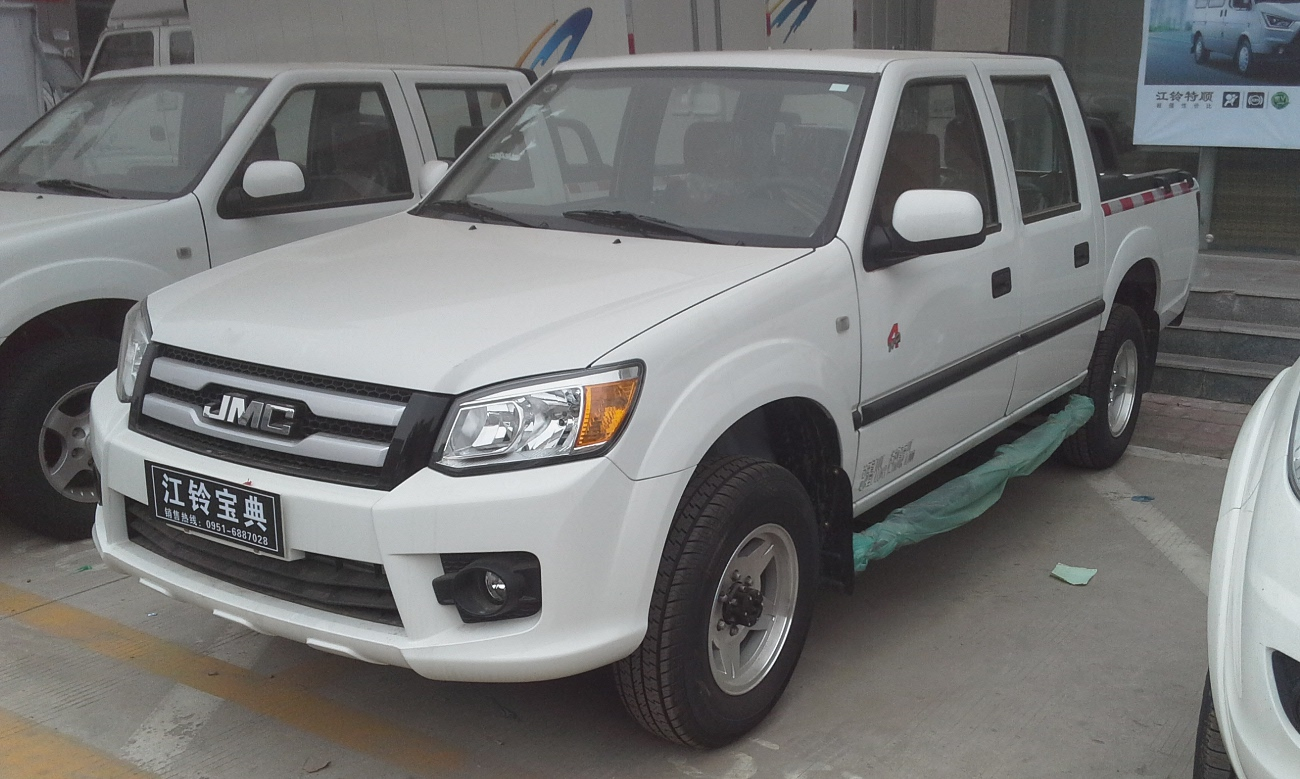
JMC Baodian third facelift

=== Overseas markets ===
The Baodian is exported as the JMC Boarding to Asian, South American, and African markets (amongst others).

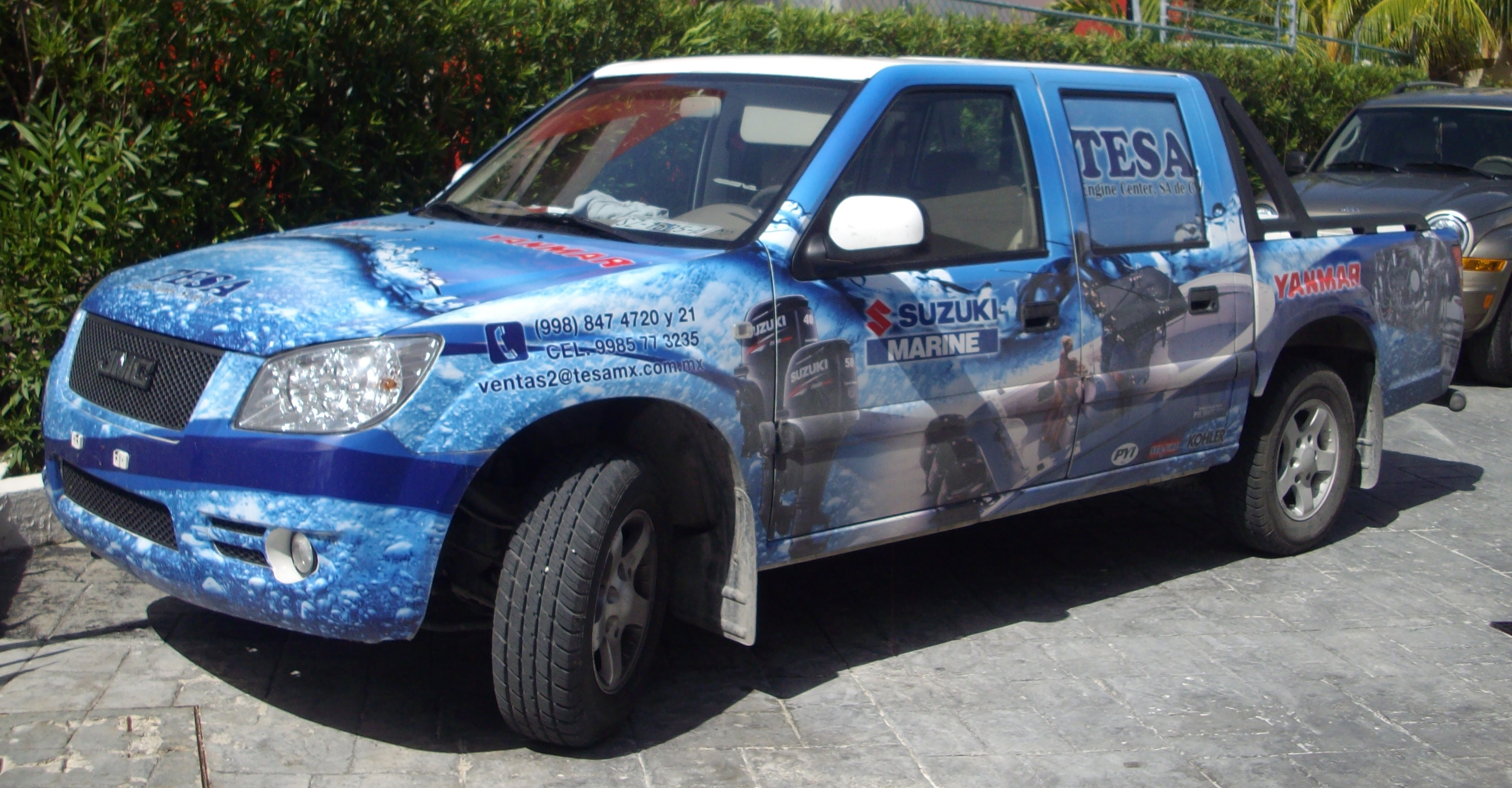
JMC Boarding

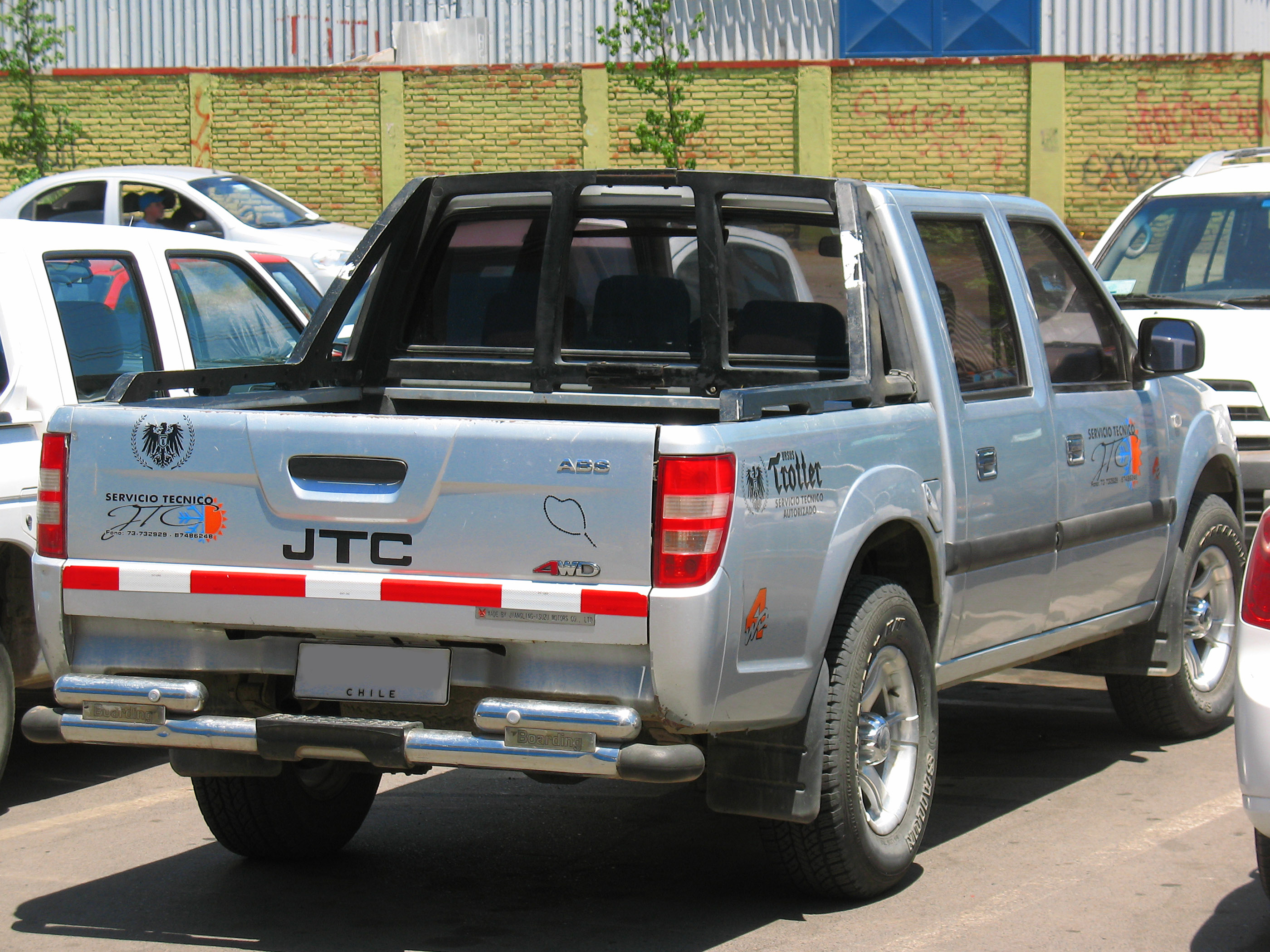
Rear view

== Second generation (2020–2023) ==
The second generation JMC Baodian is a rebadged JMC Yuhu. The updated Yuhu-based Baodian is positioned under the Yuhu range and is aimed to replace the aging Baodian pickup from August 2020. The model offers a selection of rear-wheel-drive and four-wheel-drive models with engine options of a 2.5-liter diesel turbo engine and a 1.8-liter petrol turbo engine. There are up to 16 trim levels available.

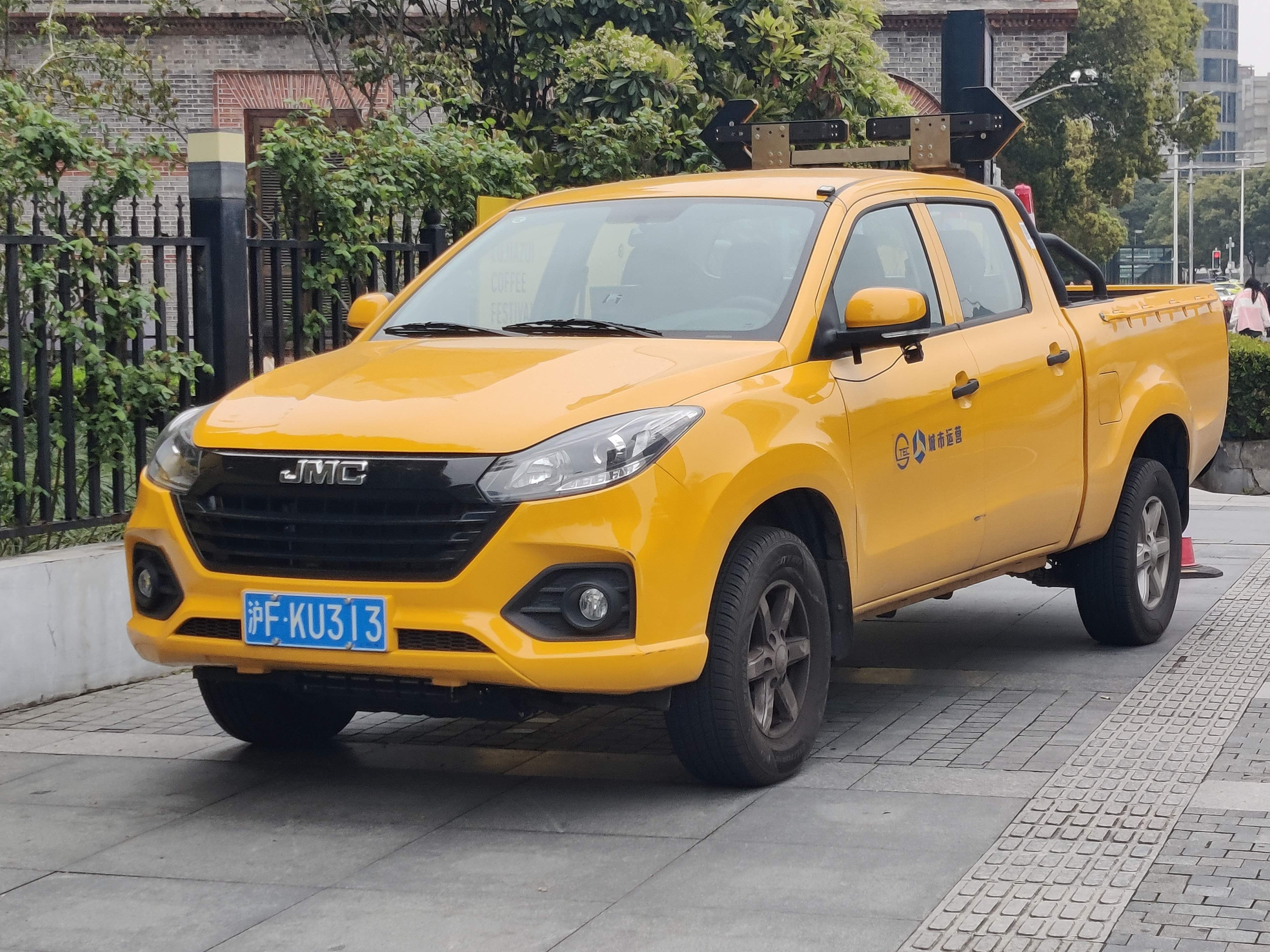
JMC Baodian II

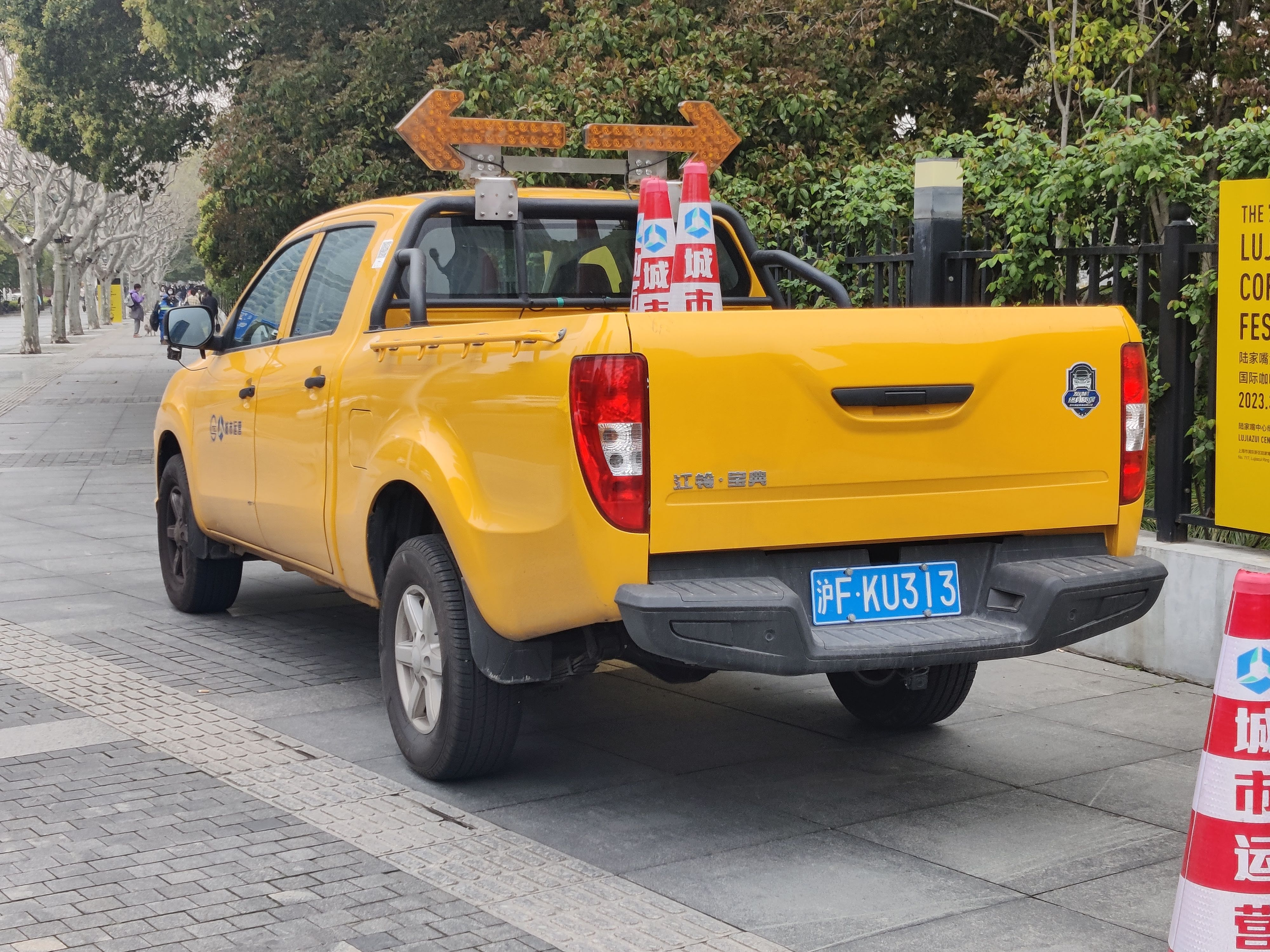
Rear view

In January 2023, the Yuhu-based second generation Baodian received a facelift for the 2023 model year featuring a styling update, while the powertrain remains as the same 2.5-liter diesel turbo engine and a 1.8-liter petrol turbo engines.

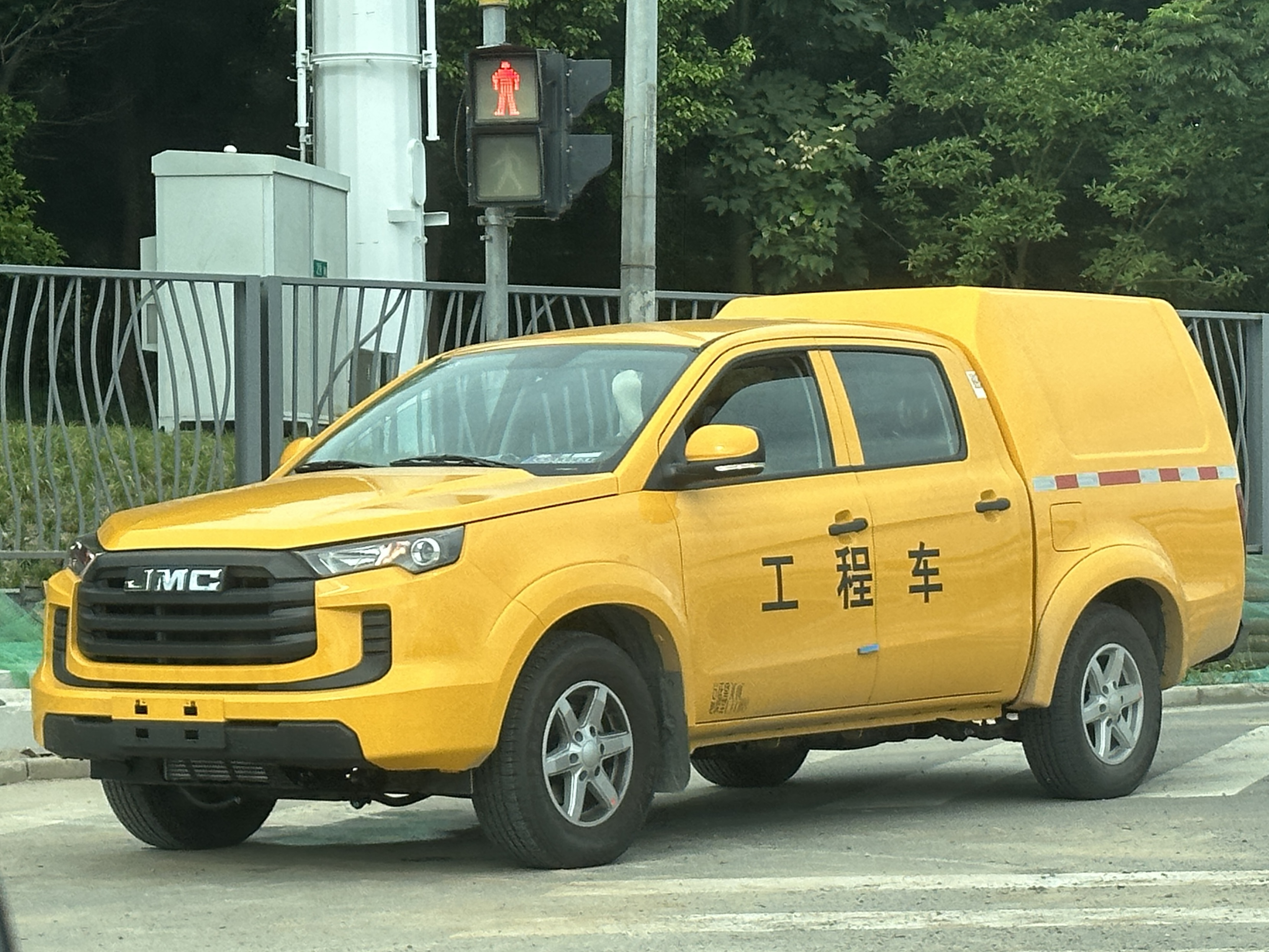
JMC Baodian II 2023MY

== Third generation (2025–) ==
JMC Baodian III
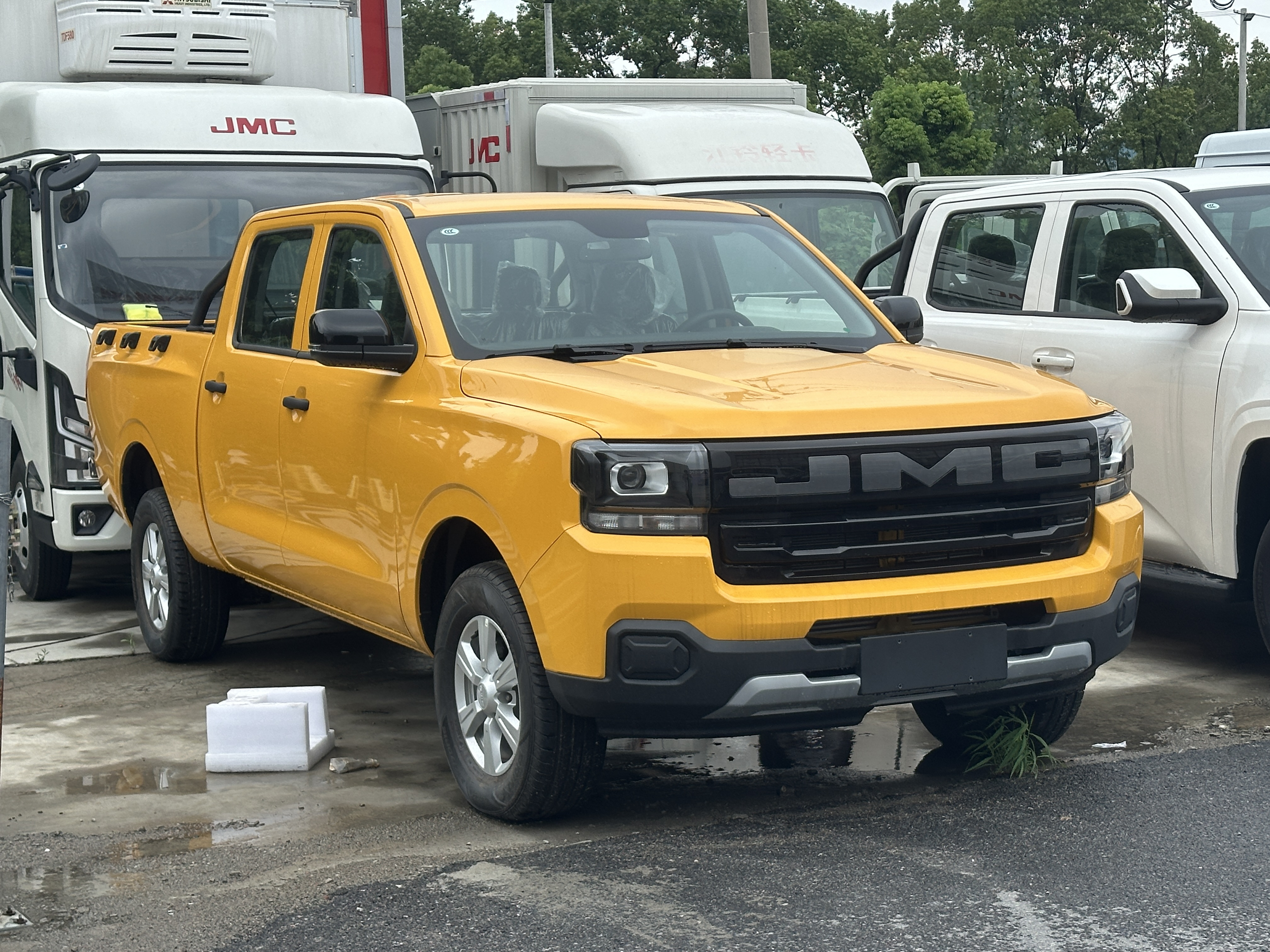

Overview
- Also called: JMC Vigus; JMC Vigus Plus
- Production: 2025–present
- Assembly: China: Nanchang, Jiangxi

Body and chassis
- Layout: Front-engine, rear-wheel-drive Front-engine, four-wheel-drive
- Related: JMC Yuhu (second generation)

Powertrain
- Engine: Gasoline: 2.0 L N20TG Turbo I4; Diesel: 2.5 L NB25A6L turbodiesel I4
- Transmission: 5-speed manual transmission 8-speed automatic transmission

Dimensions
- Wheelbase: 124 in (3,150 mm); 135 in (3,440 mm) (LWB)
- Length: 210 in (5,335 mm); 221 in (5,625 mm) (LWB)
- Width: 74 in (1,882 mm)
- Height: 71 in (1,792 mm)

The third generation Baodian is the first independent model featuring brand new design all around. It was first launched in March 2025, and is available as a long wheelbase model. Previous powertrains have been carried over with an additional 2.5 liter turbo diesel engine available producing a maximum output of 118 kW (158 hp) and 410 N⋅m (302 lb⋅ft) paired with a 5-speed manual transmission or an 8-speed automatic transmission.

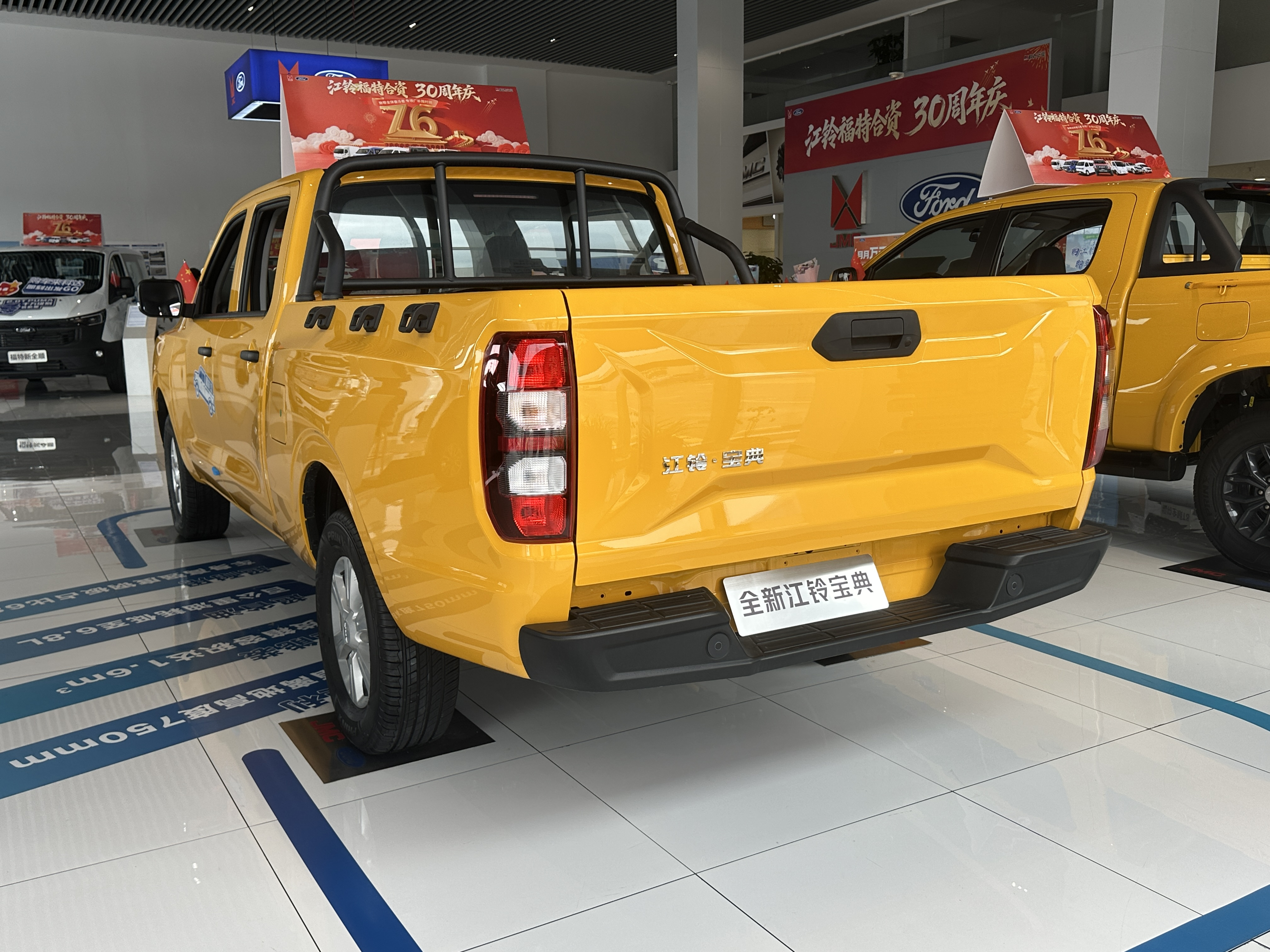
Rear view

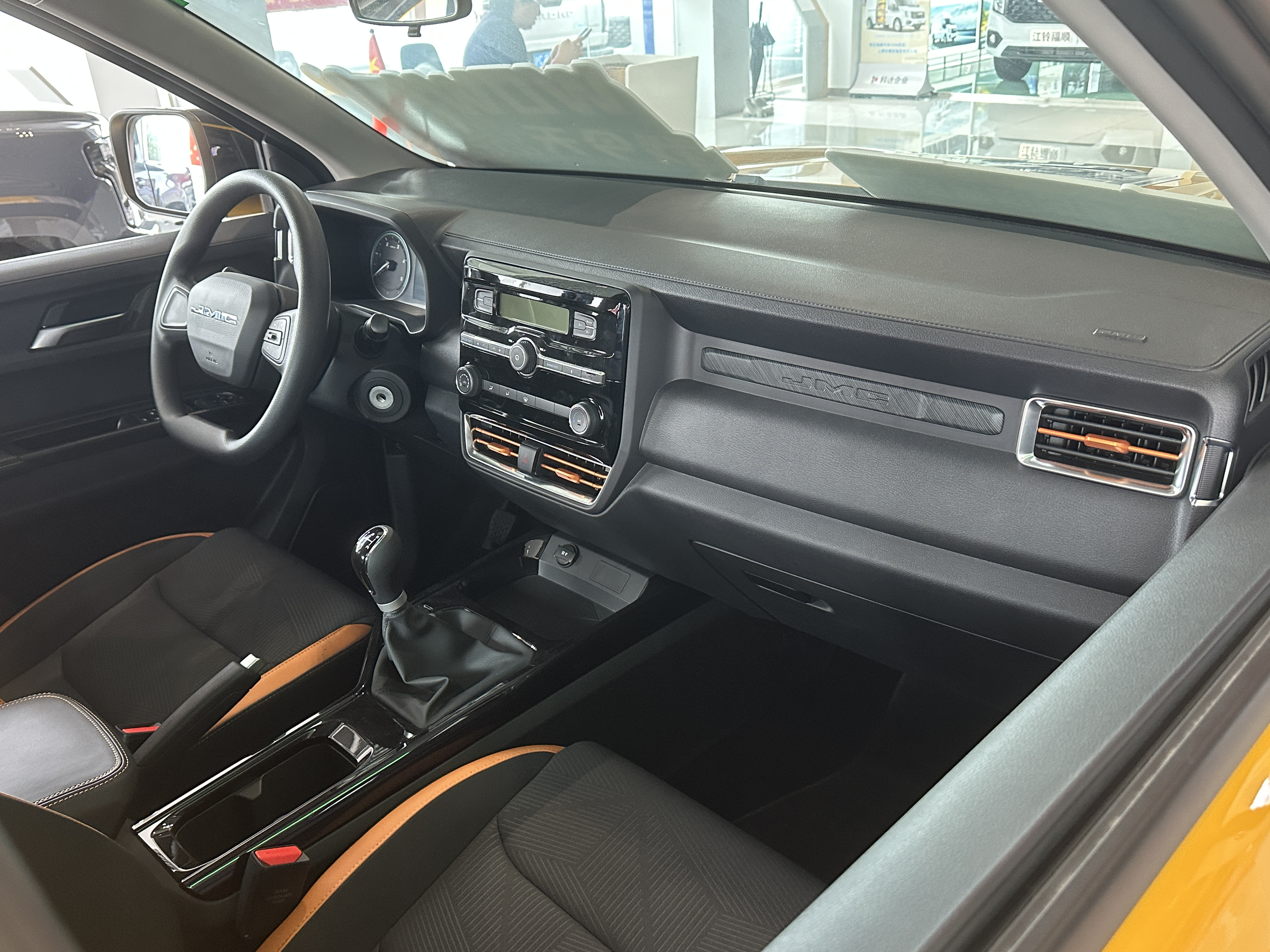
Interior
