= Ford Transit City =

Battery electric van

Overview
- Manufacturer: Ford
- Production: August 2026 – present
- Assembly: China: Nanchang (Jiangling Motors)

Body and chassis
- Class: Light commercial vehicle
- Body style: 5-door van; 2-door chassis cab
- Layout: Front-motor, front-wheel-drive
- Related: JMC E-Fushun

Powertrain
- Battery: 56 kWh LFP
- Range: 254 km (157.8 mi) (WLTP)

The Ford Transit City is a battery electric van jointly developed by Ford of Europe and Jiangling Motors (JMC) and marketed by Ford since 2026.

== Overview ==
The Transit City was revealed on 26 March 2026. It is positioned between the Transit Courier and Transit Custom in Ford's European van lineup. Built on the same platform as the Chinese-developed JMC E-Fushun, it is built in JMC's plant in Nanchang. Ford China announced that the first Transit Citys rolled off the production line on 31 August 2026, with the first batch of exports expected reach 1,000 units.

It is available in only one trim that also covers features such as adaptive cruise control, lane keeping assist, front and rear parking sensors, a rear-view camera and a heated steering wheel. The dashboard includes a 12.3-inch touchscreen running Ford's Sync infotainment system supporting wireless CarPlay and Android Auto, a digital instrument cluster and some storage compartments.

It is powered by a front motor outputting 147 horsepower (110 kW; 149 PS). It has a maximum payload capacity of 1,600 kilograms (3,500 lb) and a cargo volume of 6.5 cubic metres (230 cu ft; 6,500 L).

== Markets ==
=== Europe ===
The Transit City became available to order from August 2026, before production commenced in China for export to Europe.

=== South America ===
In July 2026, Ford announced the Transit City would enter Brazil and other South American markets by the second half of the year.

=== Australia and New Zealand ===
In September, Ford Australia announced it would launch the Transit City in Australia and New Zealand in November, starting at AU$50,000.
