= Ford Bronco Basecamp =

Mid-size crossover SUV

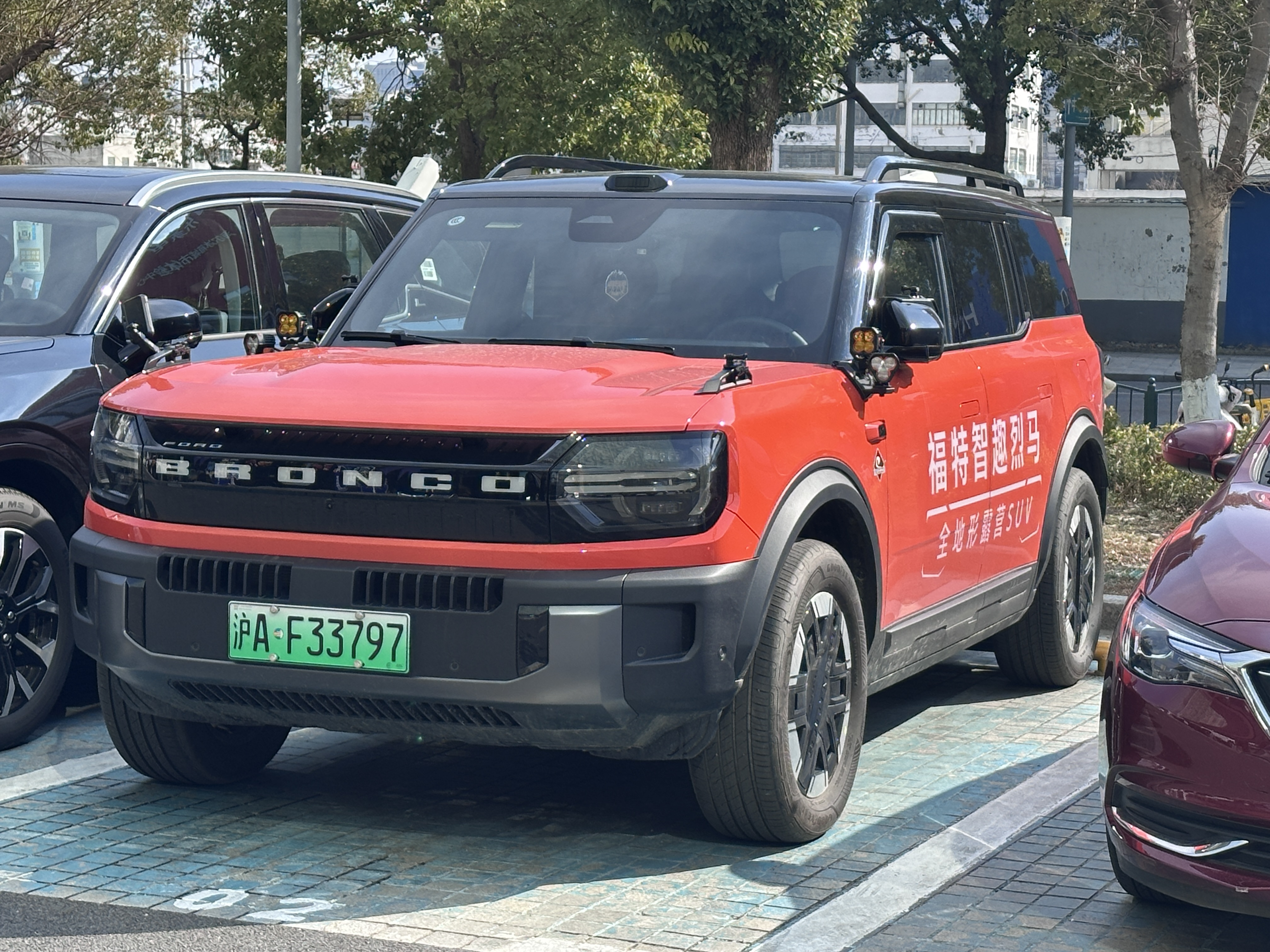

Overview
- Manufacturer: Ford
- Model code: CX835
- Also called: Ford Bronco New Energy (China)
- Production: December 2025 – present
- Assembly: China: Nanchang (Jiangling Ford Auto)

Body and chassis
- Class: Mid-size crossover SUV
- Body style: 5-door SUV
- Layout: Dual-motor, all-wheel-drive (EV); Front-engine, dual-motor, all-wheel-drive (EREV)
- Chassis: Unibody

Powertrain
- Engine: Gasoline range extender: 1.5 L GE15A6L turbo I4
- Electric motor: 2× permanent magnet Synchronus Motors
- Power output: 415–445 hp (309–332 kW; 421–451 PS)
- Hybrid drivetrain: Series hybrid
- Battery: 105.4 kWh LFP Blade FinDreams (EV); 43.7 kWh LFP Blade FinDreams (EREV)
- Range: CLTC: 1,220 km (758 mi) (EREV); NEDC: 1,150 km (715 mi) (EREV)
- Electric range: CLTC: 650 km (404 mi) (EV); 220 km (137 mi) (EREV); NEDC: 610 km (379 mi) (EV); 180 km (112 mi) (EREV)

Dimensions
- Wheelbase: 2,950 mm (116.1 in)
- Length: 5,025 mm (197.8 in)
- Width: 1,960 mm (77.2 in)
- Height: 1,815 mm (71.5 in)
- Curb weight: 2,510–2,630 kg (5,534–5,798 lb)

The Ford Bronco Basecamp (Chinese: 福特智趣烈马; pinyin: Fútè Zhìqùlièmǎ) is a battery electric and range extender mid-size crossover SUV manufactured by Ford's joint venture with Jiangling Motors using the Bronco nameplate.

== Overview ==
The Bronco Basecamp is Ford first extended-range EV, but is also offered in a battery electric version. Although its wheelbase is the same as the regular four-door Bronco, it is 8 inches (200 mm) longer.

It is not mechanically related to either the Bronco or the Bronco Sport, the latter of which is unavailable in China.

Production began at the Nanchang factory on 12 December 2025. One of the very first examples of the Bronco Basecamp to be produced also happened to be the 200,000th SUV produced by the Nanchang factory.

Ford Bronco Basecamp Outer Banks EV

Rear view

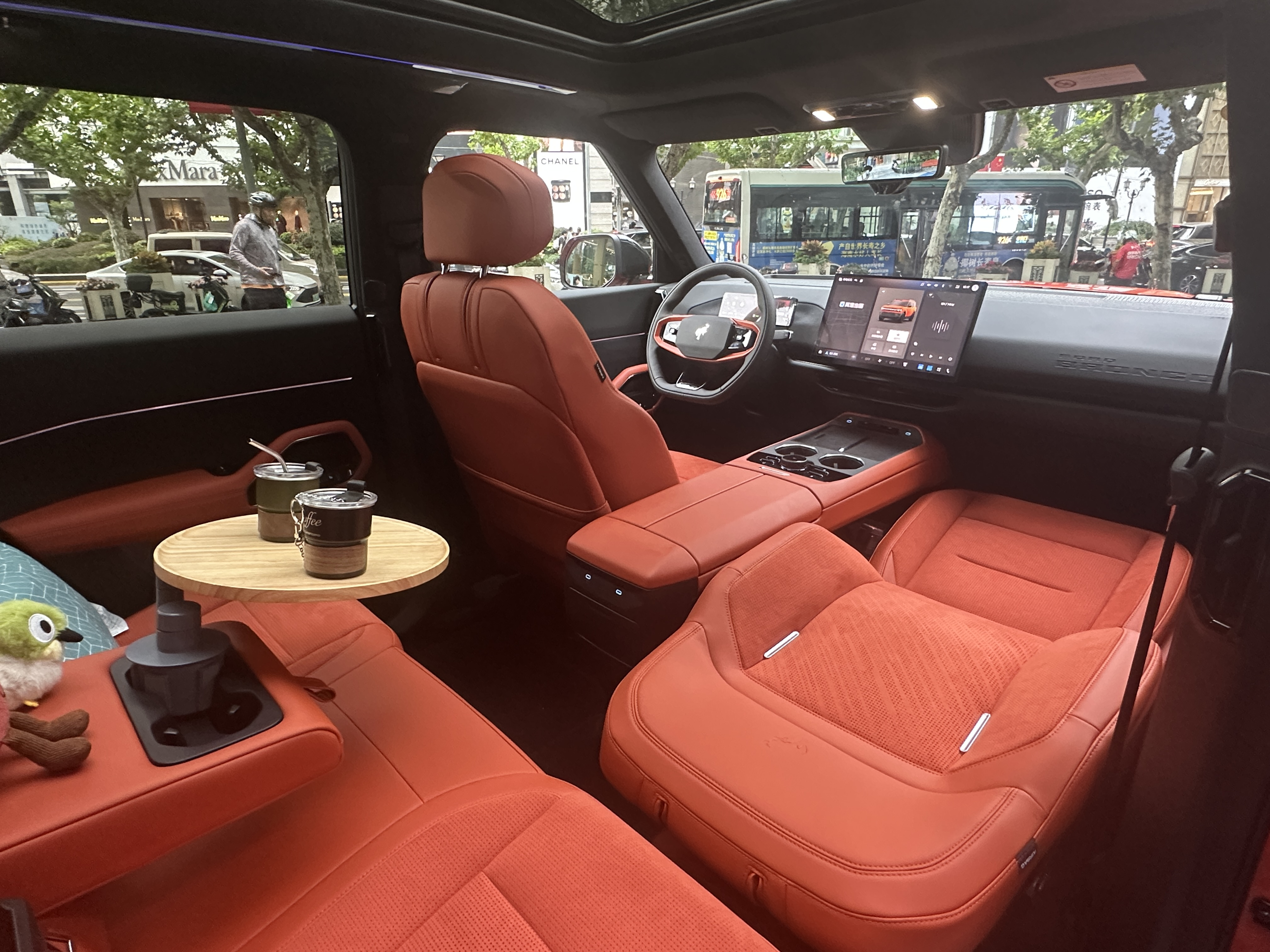
Interior

Ford Bronco Basecamp and Bronco (China)

=== Design and equipment ===
The Bronco Basecamp shares design cues with both Bronco and Bronco Sport models, sharing the headlight design with the regular Bronco and the plastic cladding of the Bronco Sport. The Bronco Basecamp also inherits the swinging rear tailgate and the rear-mounted spare tire from the regular Bronco.

The Bronco Basecamp is equipped with an ADAS system with a sensor suite that includes 30 sensors, including a LiDAR sensor mounted above the windshield.

The Bronco Basecamp comes with a 15.6-inch central touchscreen and an optional 70-inch heads-up display.

== Special version ==
At the 2025 Chengdu Auto Show, the Ford was presented a special version as the Ford Bronco Basecamp. It features a factory pop-up roof that adds 36 centimeters (11.8 inches) of headroom and a "Nap Mode" that folds the front headrests and reclines the rear seats. A refrigerator and curtain are also available as options. The Bronco Basecamp also features a 6 kW external power supply and a modular tailgate with an integrated induction cooktop, table, magnetic attachments, and a spice rack built in.

Pre-sales of the Bronco Basecamp began on 2nd October 2025. Customers can get ¥12,000 ($1,685) in free equipment by placing a ¥1,000 ($140) deposit on the Bronco Basecamp. In December, it was reported that the vehicle would get exported to Australia, Southeast Asia, the Middle East and South America. It is scheduled to release in Australia in the second half of 2027, in the EREV grade.

== Powertrain ==
The Bronco Basecamp is available with either pure electric or extended-range (EREV) powertrains which both have all-wheel-drive as standard. Electric models pair a 174 hp (130 kW; 176 PS) front motor with a 271 hp (202 kW; 275 PS) rear motor for a total of 445 horsepower (332 kW; 451 PS), while EREV models use the same front motor with a 241 hp (180 kW; 244 PS) rear motor for a total of 416 horsepower (310 kW; 422 PS).

Both versions use LFP battery packs supplied by BYD's FinDreams division. Electric models have a 105.4 kWh pack providing 650 kilometres (404 mi) of range on the CLTC cycle, while EREV models use a 43.7 kWh battery providing 220 kilometres (137 mi) of range. EREV models are also equipped with a 147 horsepower (110 kW; 149 PS) 1.5-liter turbocharged four-cylinder petrol engine generator that is not mechanically connected to the wheels that can provide a combined range of 1,220 kilometres (758 mi).

Variant	Battery	Power				Range (CLTC)		Weight	Top speed
Variant	Battery	Engine	Front	Rear	Total	EV	Total	Weight	Top speed
EREV	43.7 kWh LFP Blade FinDreams	147 hp (110 kW; 149 PS)	130 kW (170 hp; 180 PS)	180 kW (241 hp; 245 PS)	416 hp (310 kW; 422 PS)	220 km (137 mi)	1,220 km (758 mi)	2,510 kg (5,534 lb)	170 km/h (106 mph)
EV	105.4 LFP Blade Findreams	—	130 kW (170 hp; 180 PS)	202 kW (271 hp; 275 PS)	445 hp (332 kW; 451 PS)	650 km (404 mi)		2,630 kg (5,798 lb)	170 km/h (106 mph)

== Sales ==
Year	China		
Year	EREV	EV	Total
2025	478	47	525
