= JMC Yuhu 7 =

Mid-sized pickup truck

JMC Yuhu 7 (域虎7)
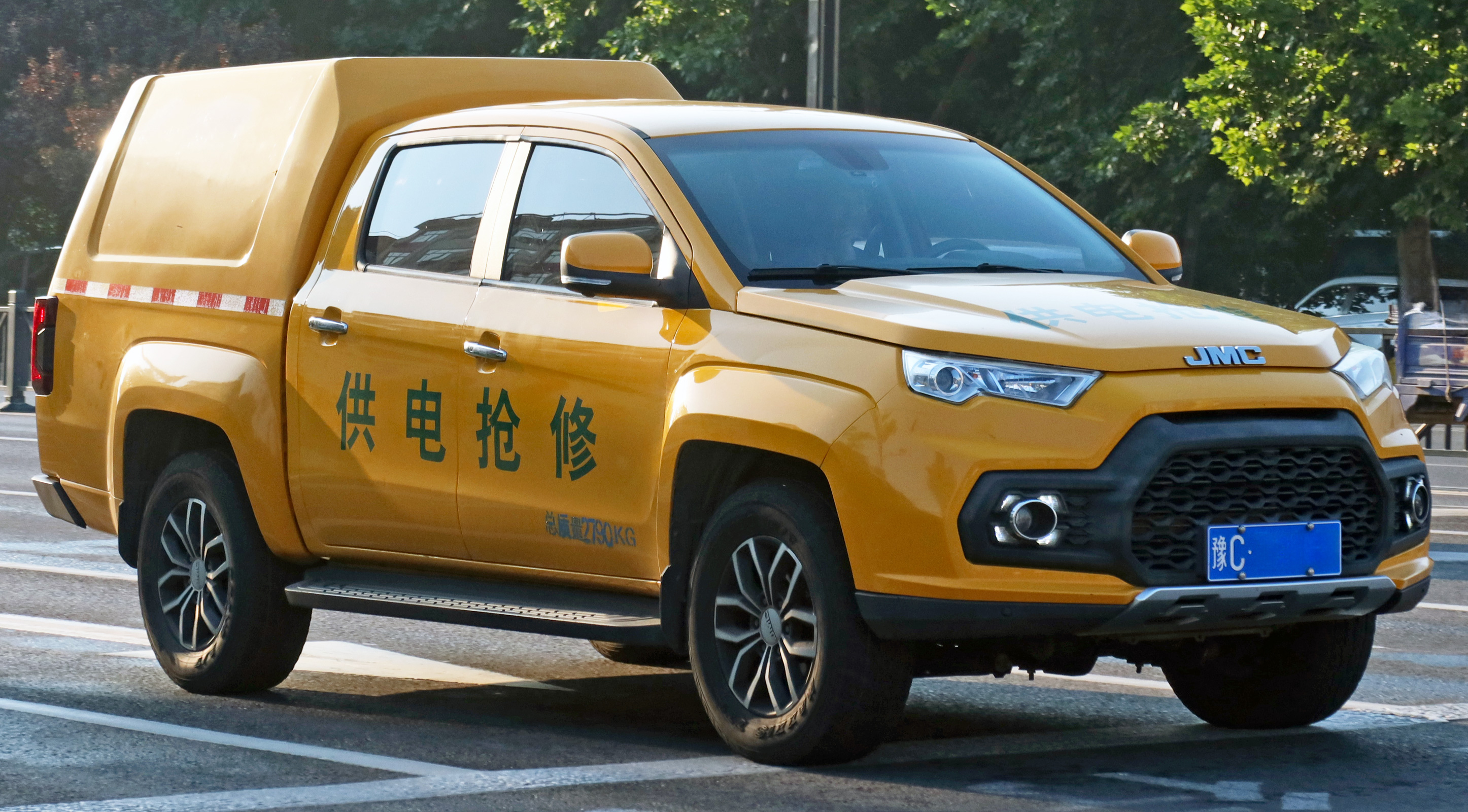

Overview
- Manufacturer: JMC
- Also called: JMC Yuhu EV (electric version)
- Production: 2017–present
- Assembly: China: Nanchang, Jiangxi

Body and chassis
- Class: Mid-size pickup truck
- Body style: 4-door double cab
- Layout: Front-engine, rear-wheel-drive or four-wheel-drive
- Platform: N350 platform
- Related: JMC Yuhu; Yusheng S350; Ford Ranger (T6); Mazda BT-50; Troller T4

Powertrain
- Engine: Petrol: 2.0 L JX4G20A5L turbo I4; Diesel: 2.4 L JX4D20A5L turbo I4
- Electric motor: Permanent magnet synchronous motor (EV)
- Power output: 153 kW (205 hp; 208 PS) (JX4G20A5L); 78 kW (104 hp; 105 PS) (JX4D20A5L); 120 kW (161 hp; 163 PS) (EV)
- Transmission: 6-speed manual 6-speed automatic 1-speed direct-drive (EV)
- Battery: Li-ion battery
- Electric range: 320 km (199 mi) (standard range); 335 km (208 mi) (extended range)

Dimensions
- Wheelbase: 3,085 mm (121.5 in)
- Length: 5,375 mm (211.6 in)
- Width: 1,905 mm (75.0 in)
- Height: 1,760 mm (69 in)

Chronology
- Predecessor: JMC Yuhu

The JMC Yuhu 7 (江铃域虎7) is a mid-size pickup truck produced by Jiangling Motors for the Chinese market.

== Overview ==
During the 2015 Shanghai Motor Show, Jiangling Motors showed off a concept called the Jiangling Yuhu concept that previewed the JMC Yuhu 7 pickup.

The JMC Yuhu 7 pickup shares similar exterior design elements with the JMC Yuhu due to it being built on the same Jiangling platform. The Yuhu 7 is essentially an upgraded and restyled Yuhu, with the front and rear being the main difference. The Yuhu 7 is the second JMC vehicle to use the new JMC family front fascia that started with the JMC Teshun.

The engine options of the Yuhu 7 includes a 2.0 liter turbo gasoline engine producing 205 horsepower and 325 N-m and a 2.4 liter turbo diesel engine producing 140 horsepower and 375 N-m. The cargo bed size of the Yuhu 7 is 1475mm/1475mm/500mm.

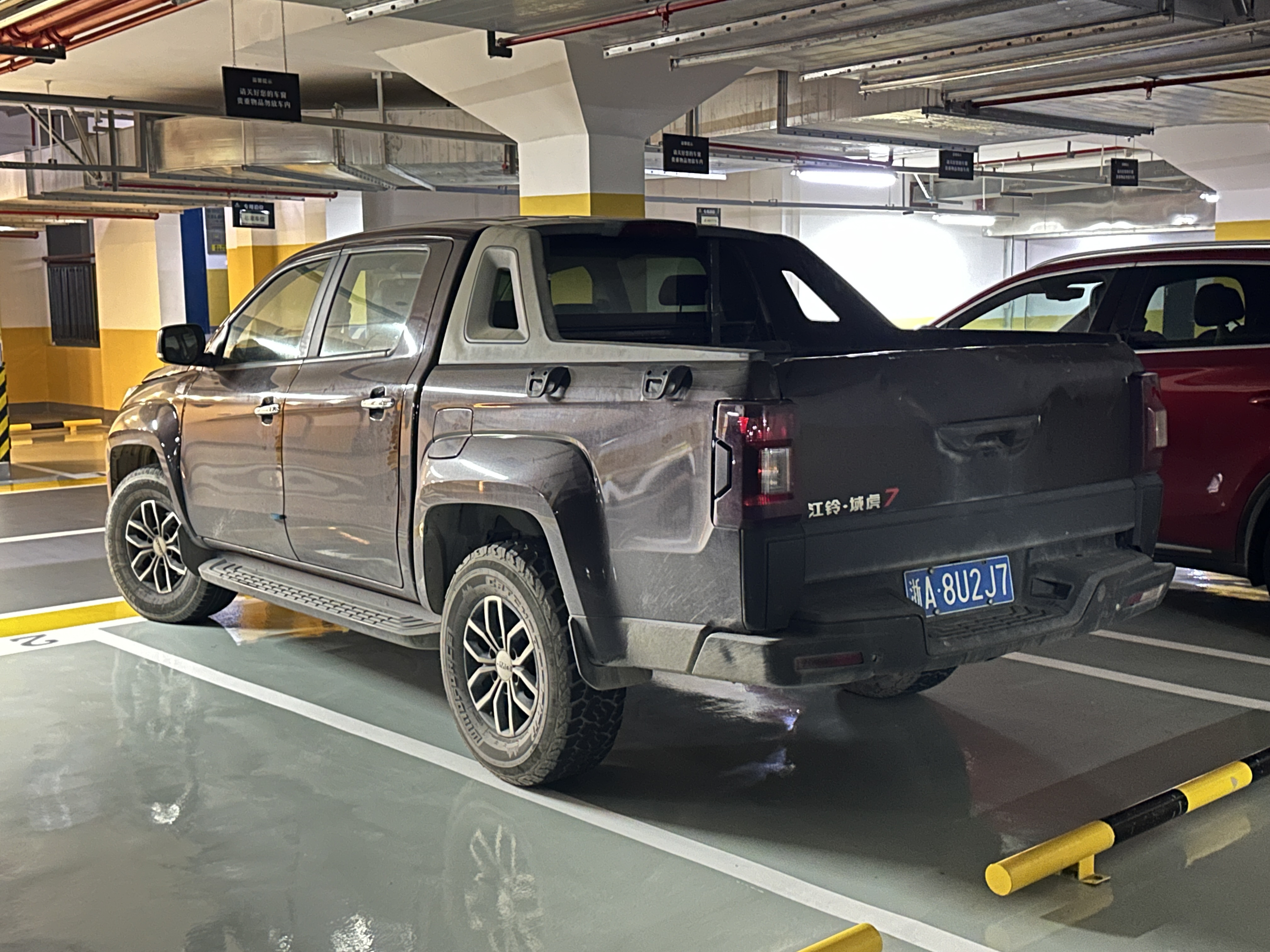
Rear view

=== 2022 Facelift ===
The Yuhu 7 received a facelift in November 2021 for the 2022 model year. The updated Yuhu 7 features a restyled front end and the powertrain is a Ecoboost 2.0 GTDi engine developing 220hp and 350N·m with the diesel version being powered by a Ford Puma 2.0 liter Turbo engine developing 141hp and 350N·m. The transmission is a 6-speed manual gearbox or a 8-speed automatic gearbox.

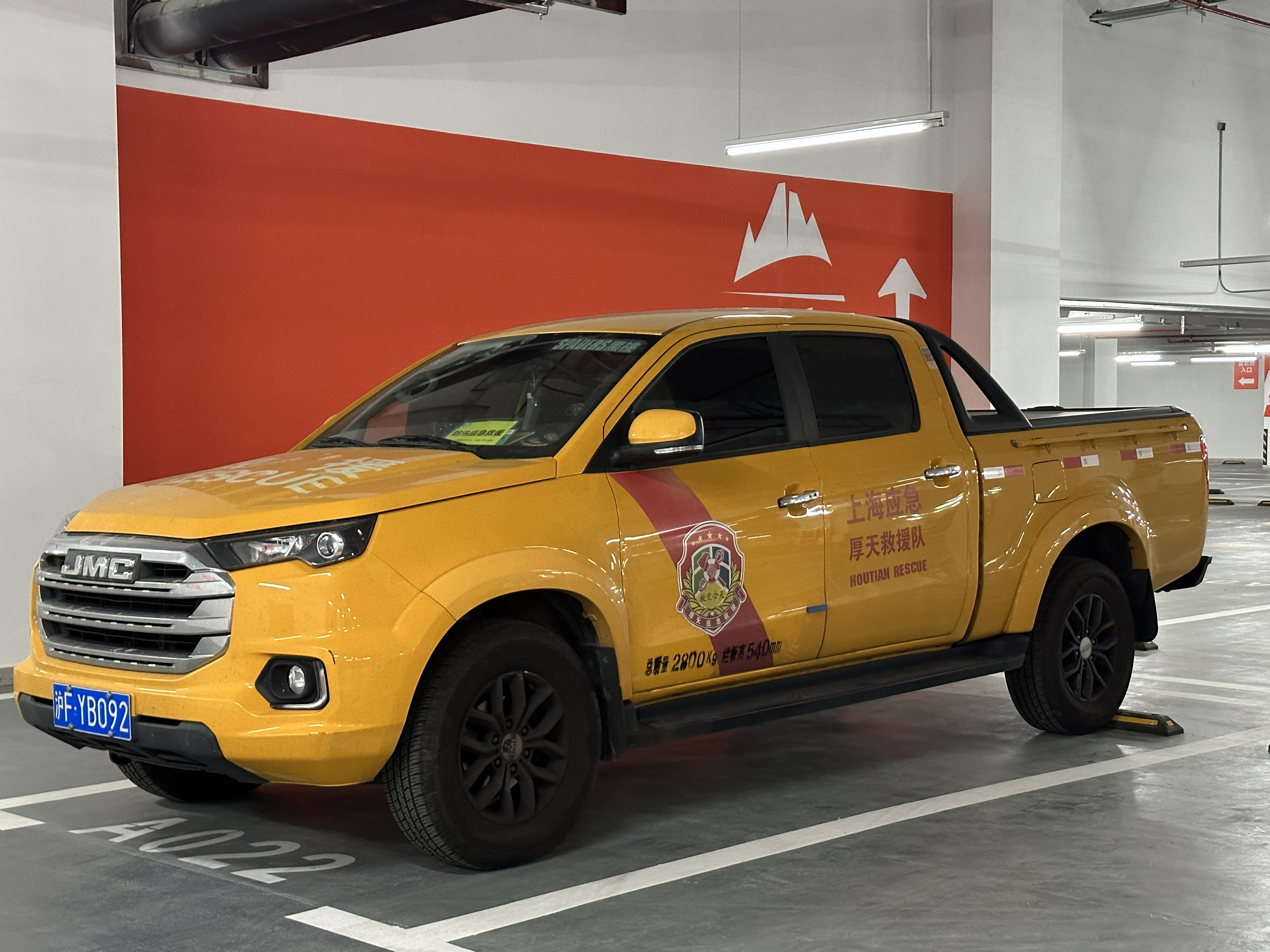
JMC Yuhu 7 MY2022

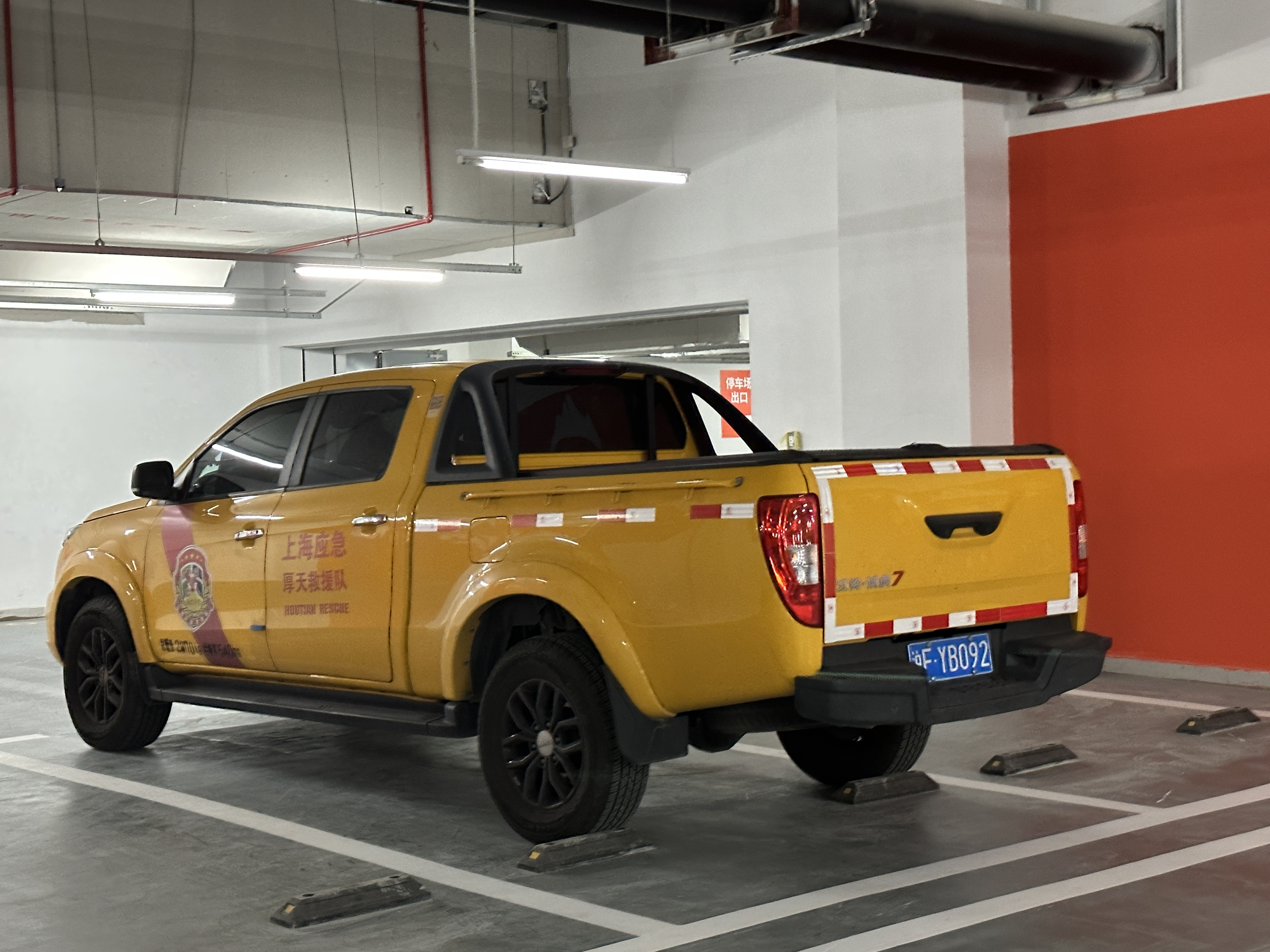
JMC Yuhu 7 MY2022 (rear)

== JMC Yuhu 7 Fishing ==
The Yuhu 7 Fishing version is equipped with a deflector and a luggage rack, and is features LED light strips in the front. The rear part of the vehicle is refitted into a closed camper cabin, and the roof is integrated with a 2-meter-long and 1.2-meter-wide raised tent.

== JMC Yuhu 7 Parent-child version ==
Similar to Yuhu 7 Fishing but focus more on family camping experience.

== JMC Yuhu EV ==
An electric version of the Yuhu pickup was built based on the same design as the Yuhu 7 pickup called the T500EV or Yuhu EV. The Yuhu EV debuted during the 2019 Shanghai Auto Show in April 2019.

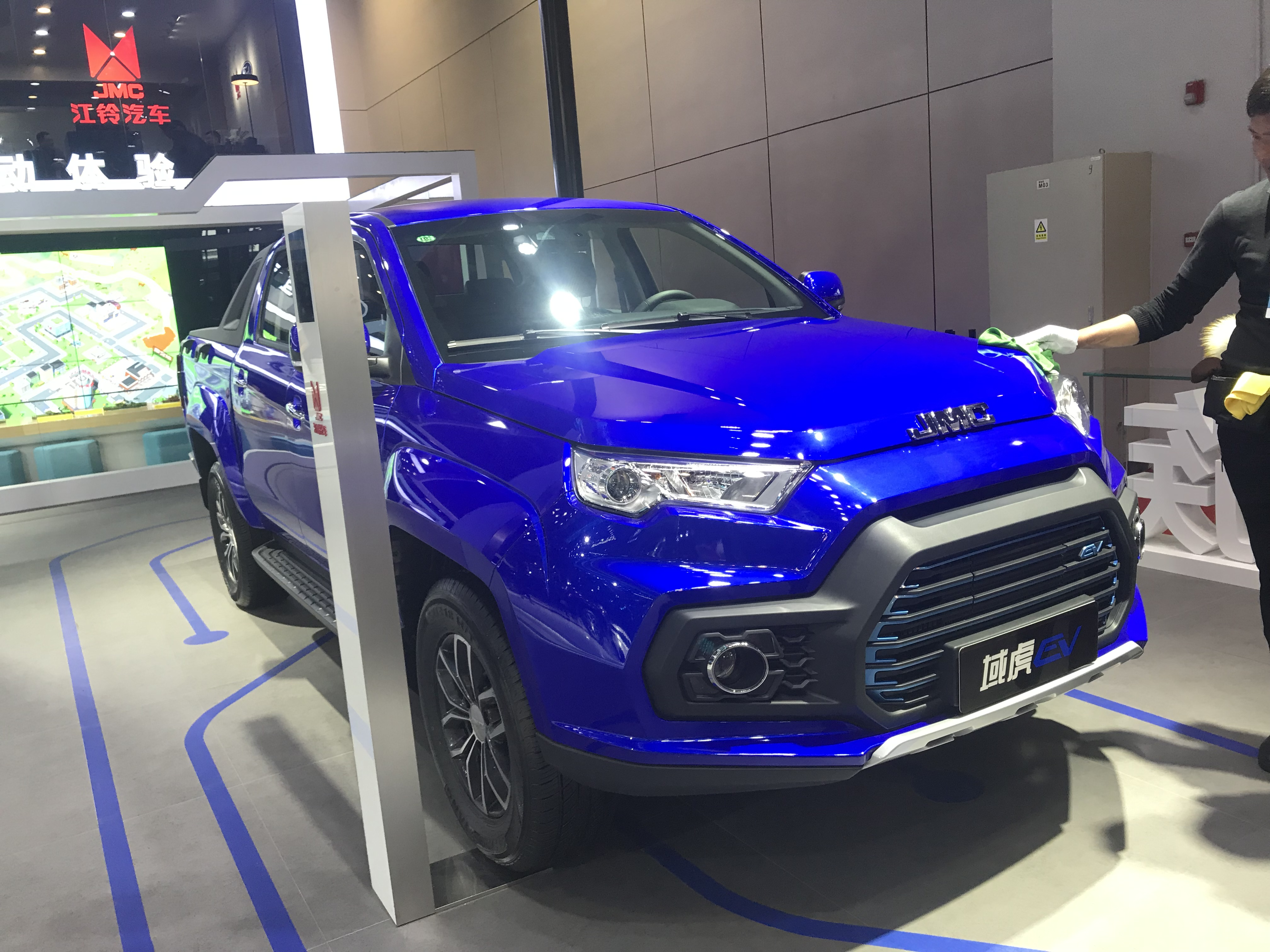
JMC Yuhu EV rear (Based on the same body as the Yuhu 7

=== Specifications ===
The Yuhu EV sports a ground clearance of 225mm and a wheelbase of 3085m. The approach angle and the departure angle are both 28.5°. The electric motor of the Yuhu EV produces 120 kW and 800N·m, and supports fast charging to have the vehicle charged within 1.5 hours. Two versions are available including a 320 km range version and a 335 km range extended version.

== JMC Yuhu 9 ==
The Yuhu 9 debuted during the 2019 Shanghai Auto Show in April 2019. The Yuhu 9 is essentially an upgraded and restyled Yuhu 7, with the front end being the main difference. The lone engine option of the Yuhu 9 is a 2.0 liter turbo gasoline engine producing 205 horsepower and 325 N-m.

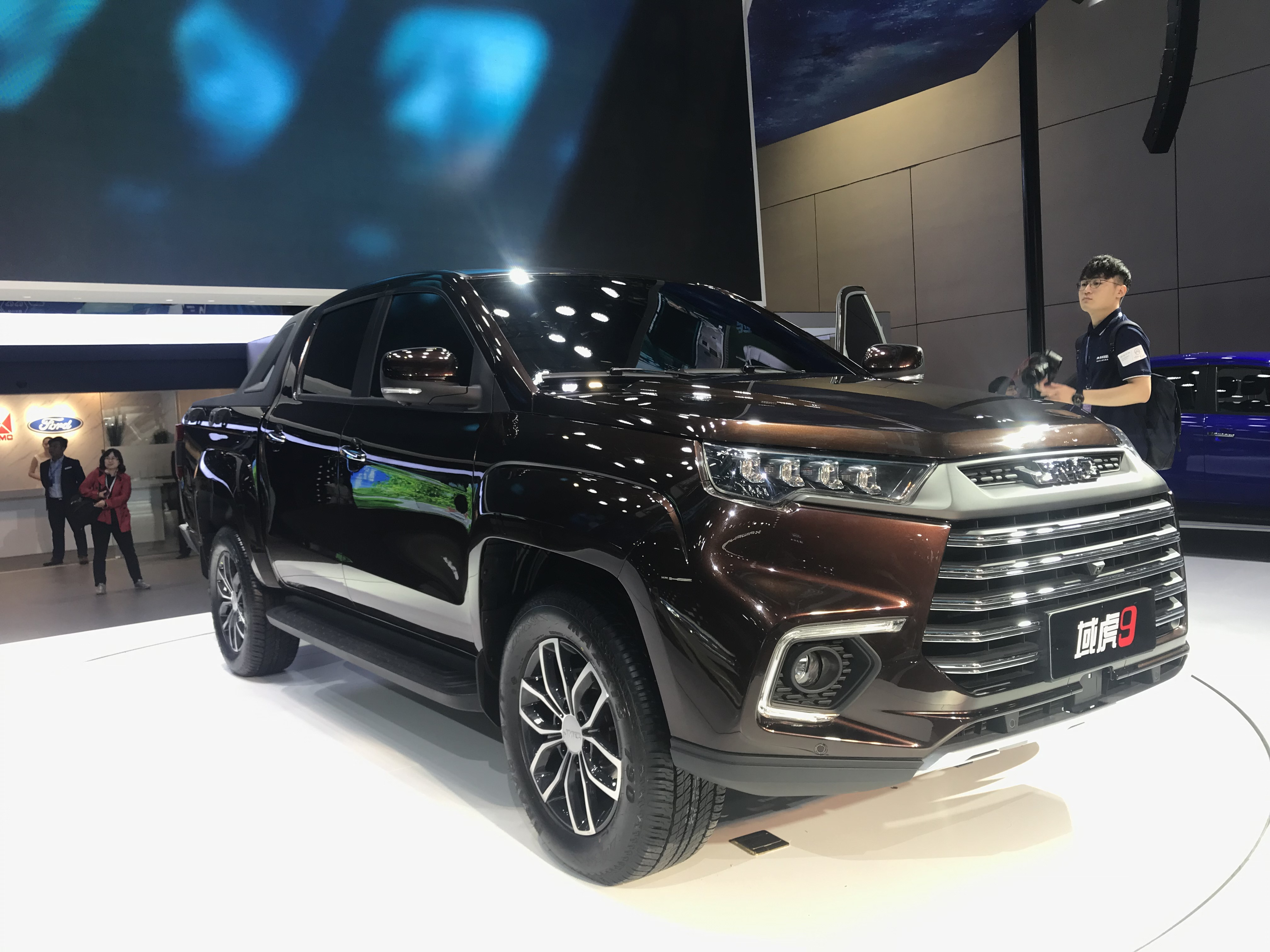
JMC Yuhu 9

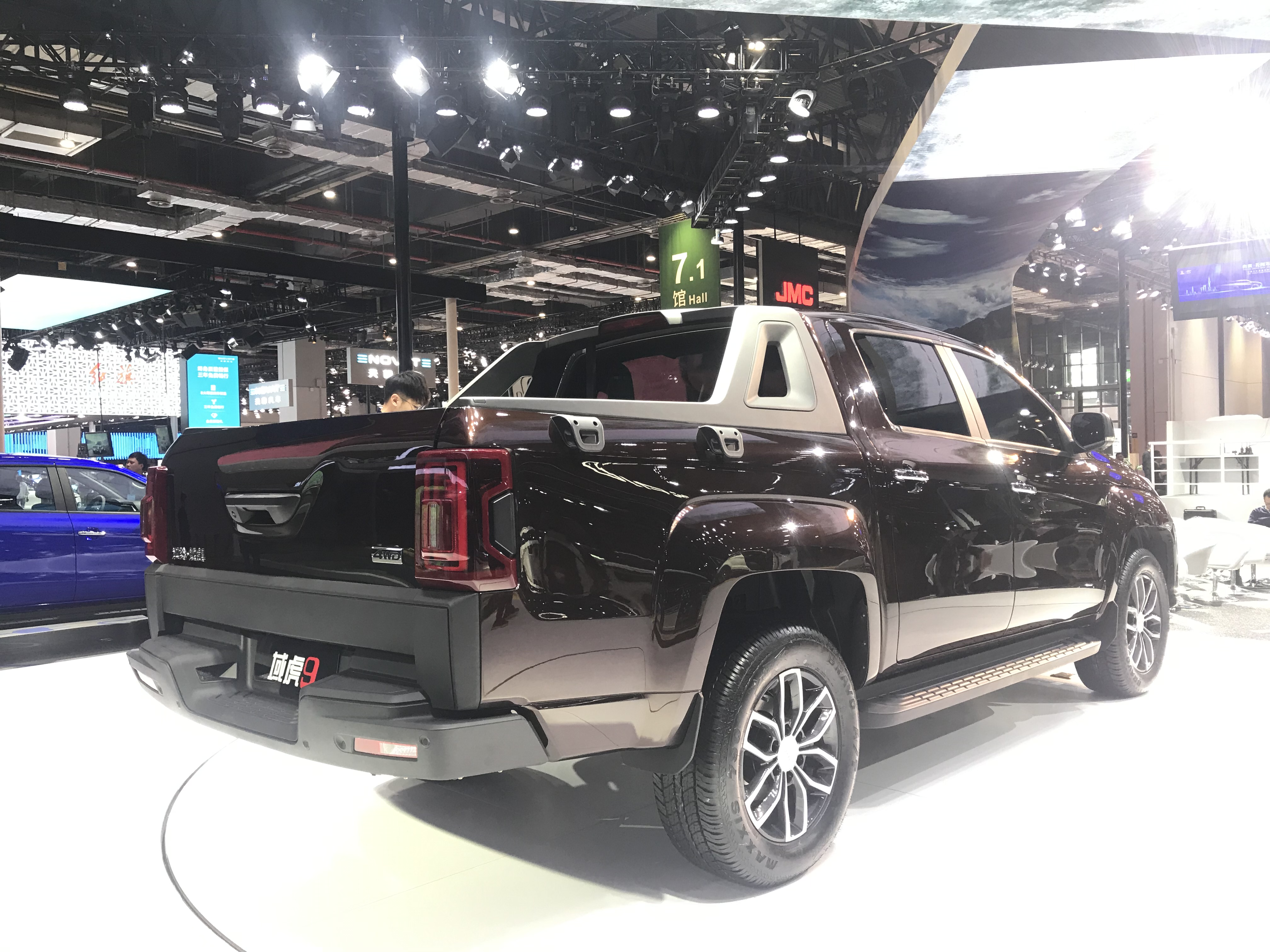
JMC Yuhu 9 (rear)
