= Jenhoo EV48 =

Battery electric van

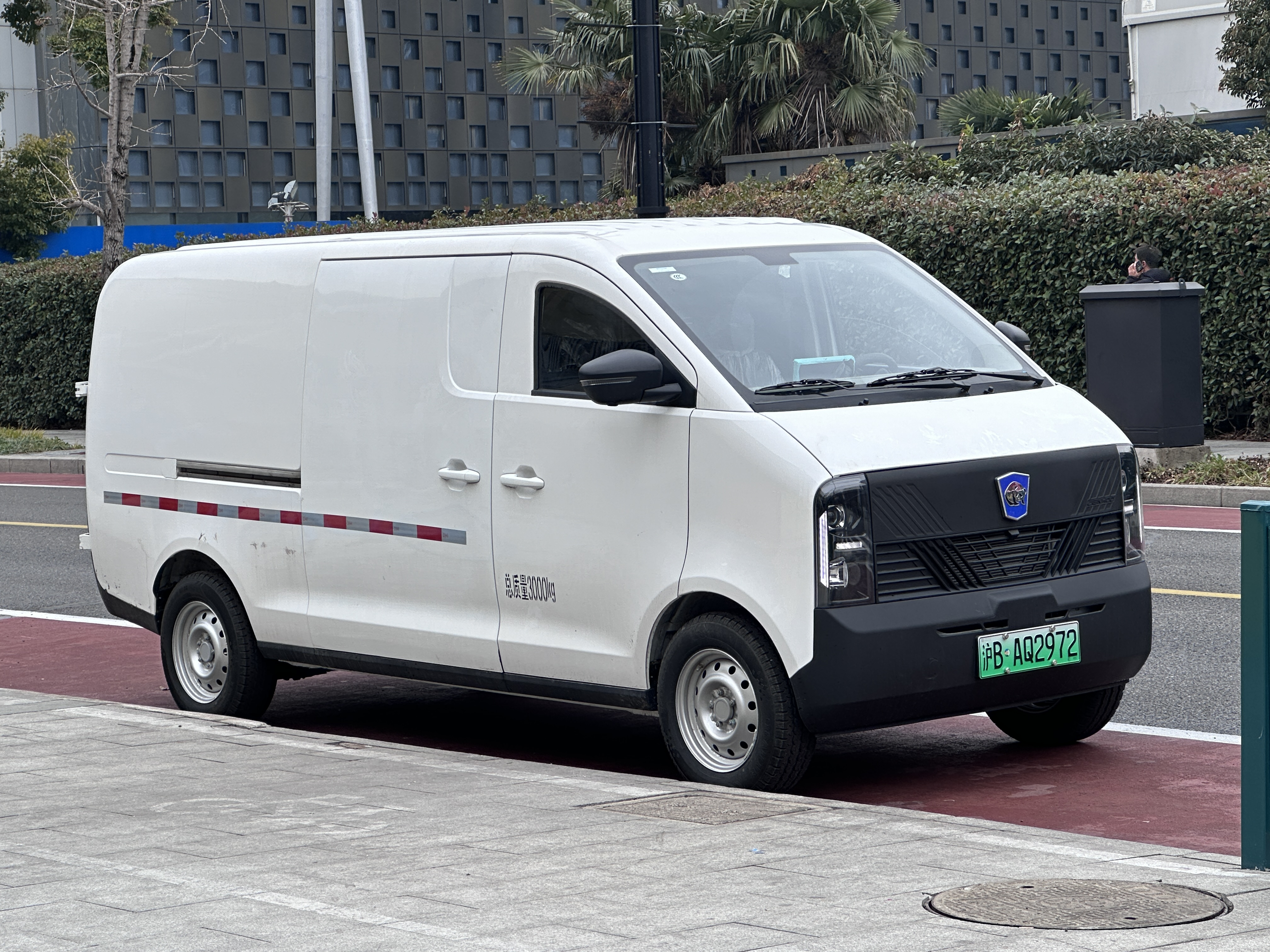

Overview
- Manufacturer: Jenhoo Auto
- Also called: Jinhu EV48; Gecko EV48; Qingling EV NANO; JMC E-Lushun V6; ElBlesk EV48 (Czech Republic); SENA EV300 (Georgia and Armenia); Tavet Vant (Nigeria); TUDOR TV-30e (Romania)
- Production: 2022–present
- Assembly: China: Nanchang (Jiangling Motors)

Body and chassis
- Class: Light commercial vehicle
- Body style: 5-door van

Powertrain
- Electric motor: TZ180XS000 electric motor from Inovance Automotive
- Battery: LFP made by CATL

Dimensions
- Wheelbase: 3,160 mm (124.4 in)
- Length: 4,860 mm (191.3 in)
- Width: 1,750 mm (68.9 in)
- Height: 1,990 mm (78.3 in)

The Jenhoo EV48 is a battery electric van being the first vehicle from the Chinese startup, Jenhoo (金琥). Jenhoo is a Chinese startup launched in December 2020, focusing on building new energy logistics vehicles.

== Overview ==
The Jenhoo EV48 is equipped with a CATL supplied battery and a TZ180XS000 electric motor from Inovance Automotive with 60 kW (82 hp), allowing the van to accelerate to a top speed of 100 km/h.

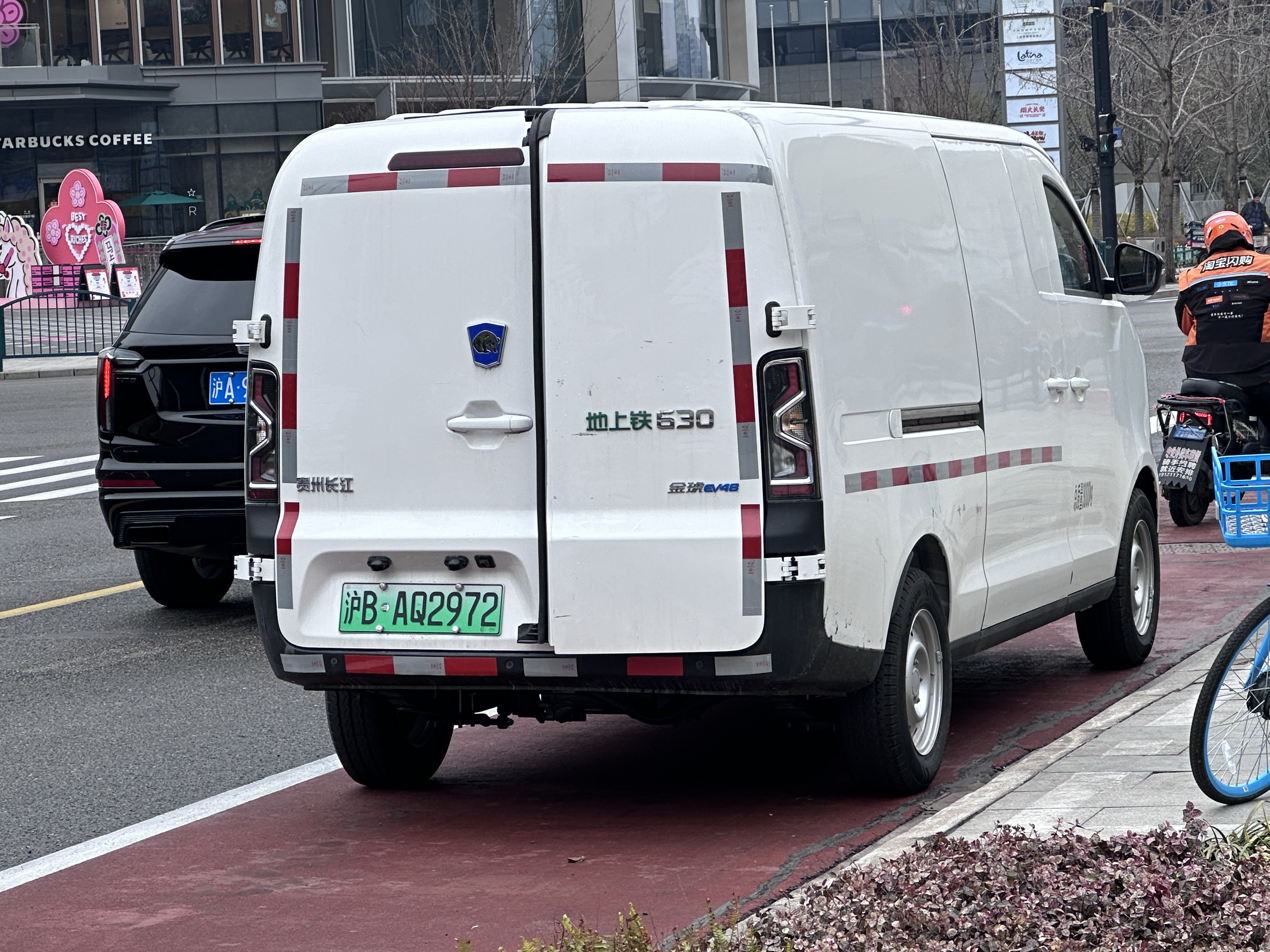
Rear view

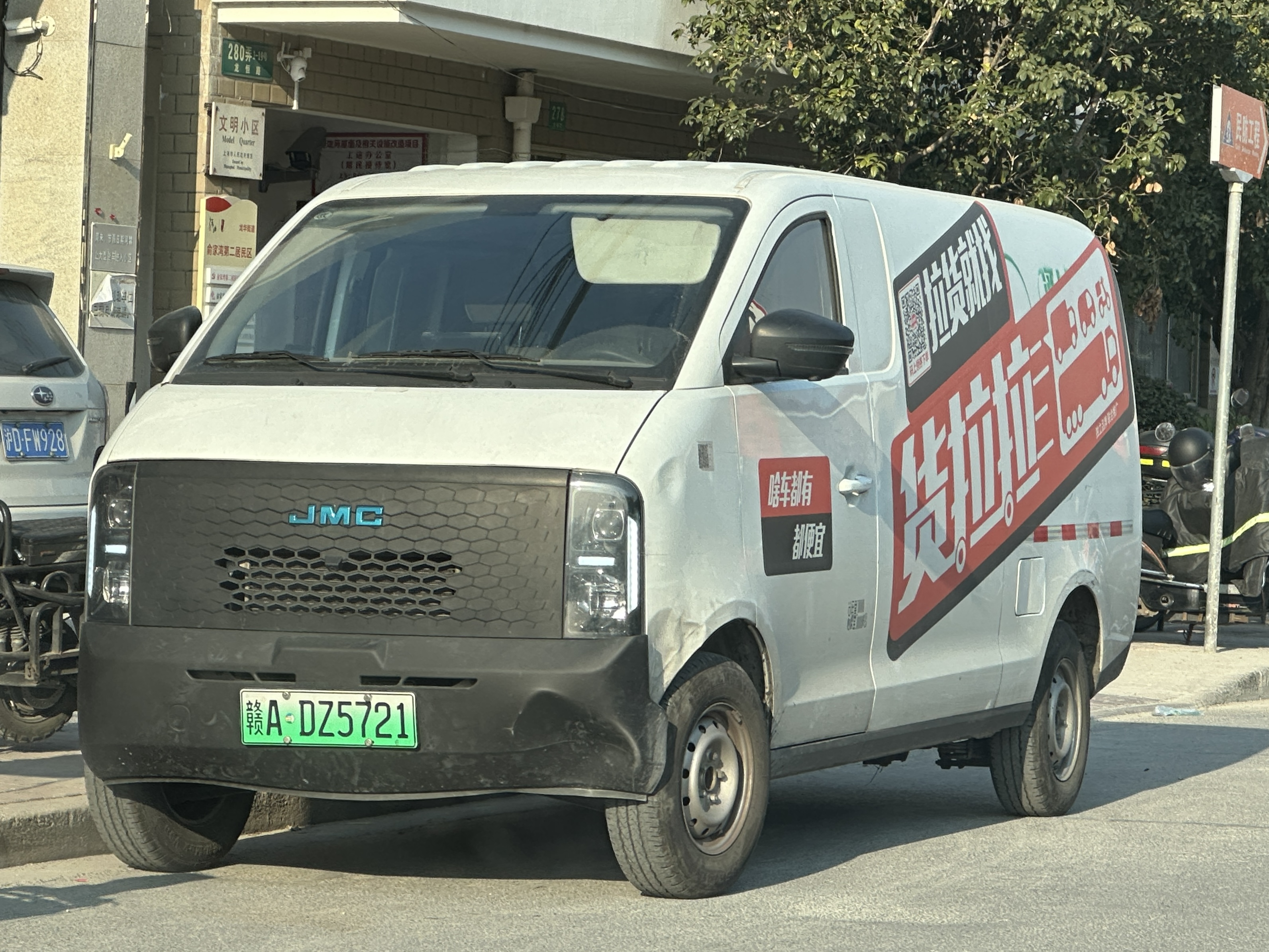
JMC E-Lushun V6
