= JMC E-Fushun =

Battery electric van

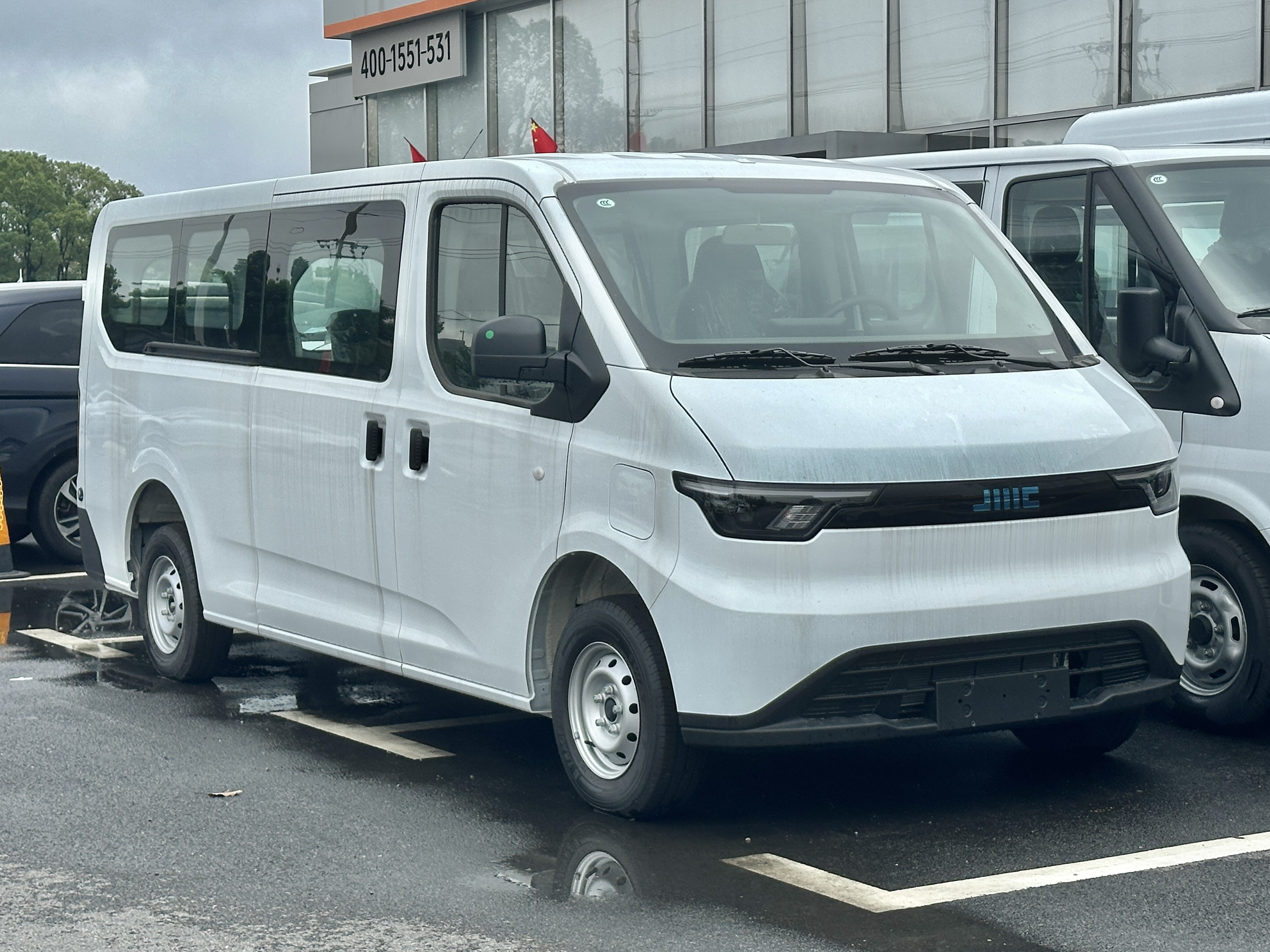
- The JMC E-Fushun in Shanghai.

Overview
- Manufacturer: JMC
- Also called: JMC Touring EV; Jenhoo EV80
- Production: 2025–present
- Assembly: China: Nanchang (Jiangling Motors)

Body and chassis
- Class: Light commercial vehicle
- Body style: 5-door van; 2-door chassis cab
- Layout: Front-motor, front-wheel-drive
- Related: Ford Transit City

Powertrain
- Electric motor: 60 kW permanent magnet synchronous
- Battery: 41.5 kWh LFP CATL; 41.86 kWh LFP CATL; 50.38 kWh LFP CATL; 53.38 kWh LFP CATL
- Electric range: 260–350 km (162–217 mi) (CLTC)

Dimensions
- Wheelbase: 3,060 mm (120.5 in) (SWB); 3,360 mm (132.3 in) (LWB)
- Length: 4,885 mm (192.3 in) (SWB); 5,185 mm (204.1 in) (LWB)
- Width: 1,890 mm (74.4 in)
- Height: 1,985 mm (78.1 in); 2,280 mm (89.8 in) (high roof)

The JMC E-Fushun (Chinese: E福顺) is a battery electric van designed and produced by the Chinese automaker JMC since 2025. It was developed on JMC’s new pure electric commercial vehicle platform and was designed for urban distribution in the commercial logistics industry.

== Overview ==
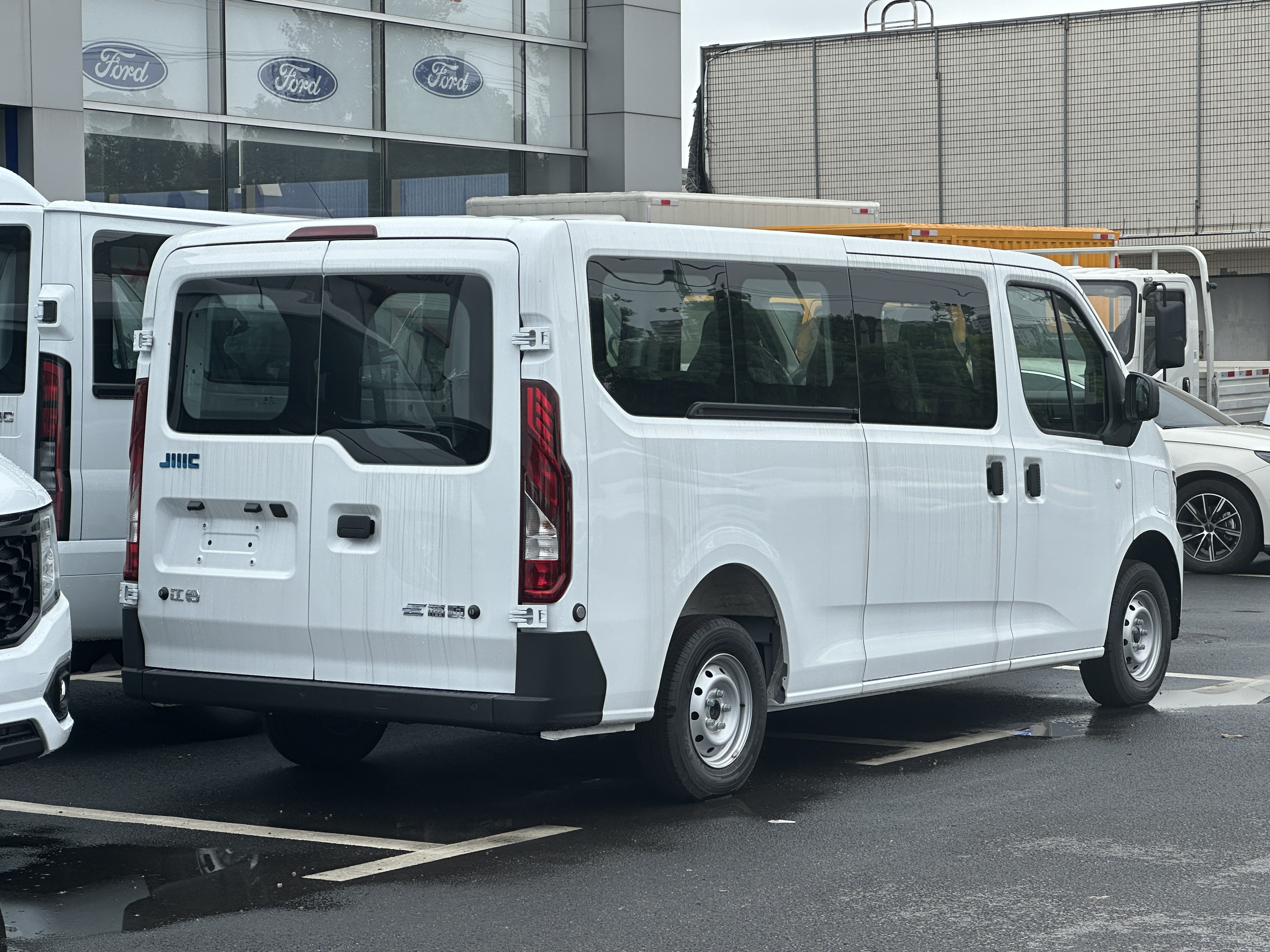
Rear view

First introduced during the 2024 Guangzhou Auto Show in November 2024, the E-Fushun is available in both long and short wheelbase models with standard and tall roof variants. Among them, the 7-seater passenger variants feature a 3+2+2 seating layout. The powertrain of the E-Fushun utilizes a rear electric drive axle layout, while featuring MacPherson strut suspensions in the front and leaf spring suspensions in the rear. The electric motors are supplied by Inovance United Power, with a maximum power output of 60 kW (80 hp; 82 PS) and a maximum speed of 100 km/h (62 mph). Batteries are 41.5 kWh, 41.86 kWh, 50.38 kWh, and 53.58 kWh lithium iron phosphate batteries supplied by CATL. Depending on the model and variants, the CLTC range is expected to go from 260 to 350 km (162 to 217 mi).
