= Jiangling Motors =

Chinese automobile manufacturer

Jiangling Motors Corporation Limited
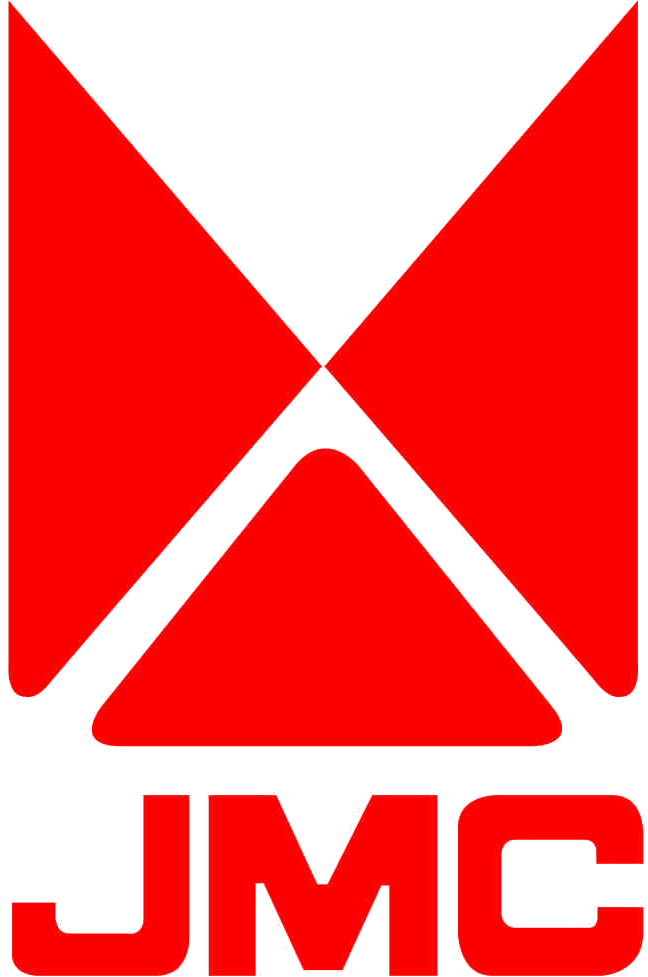
- Type: Public
- Traded as: SZSE: 000550
- Industry: Automotive
- Predecessor: JMCG truck production division
- Founded: 1993; 33 years ago
- Headquarters: Nanchang, Jiangxi, China
- Key people: Tiangao Qiu (chairman); Chunying Xiong (president)
- Products: Automobiles
- Production output: ▼281,594 (2022)
- Revenue: ▼CN¥30.10 billion (2022)
- Operating income: ▲CN¥0.90 billion (2022)
- Net income: ▲CN¥0.86 billion (2022)
- Total assets: ▲CN¥27.47 billion (2022)
- Total equity: ▲CN¥9.24 billion (2022)
- Owners: Nanchang Jiangling Investment Co., Ltd. (41.03%) (Note: Jiangling Investment is an equally-owned holding whose ultimate controllers are the Nanchang State-owned Assets Supervision and Administration Committee and the SASAC.); Ford Motor Company (32%)
- Number of employees: 12,339 (December 2022)
- Divisions: JMC Yusheng; JMC New Energy
- Subsidiaries: JMC Heavy Duty Vehicle (dormant); Jiangling Ford Motor Technology (Shanghai) Company (51%)

Chinese name
- Simplified Chinese: 江铃汽车股份有限公司
- Traditional Chinese: 江鈴汽車股份有限公司
Transcriptions
Standard Mandarin
- Hanyu Pinyin: Jiānglíng Qìchē Gǔfèn Yǒuxiàn Gōngsī
- Website: jmc.com.cn

Jiangling Motors Corporation Limited, abbreviated JMC, is a Chinese automobile manufacturer. According to company and press reports, the largest shareholder of JMC is Jiangling Investment, a company controlled equally by the state-owned enterprises Changan and Jiangling Motors Corporation Group (JMCG).

== History ==
The history of Jiangling Motors Corporation (JMC) can be traced to a truck repair shop opened in Nanchang in 1947 which operated under the name Nanchang Motors Repair Factory. A JMC predecessor started assembling vehicles in 1968. The company was granted the approval of Jiangxi Province Economic Restructuring Commission to be reorganized to establish a joint stock limited company on February 20, 1993. JMC A shares and B shares were listed on Shenzhen Stock Exchange on December 1, 1993, and September 29, 1995, respectively.

In the 1990s, Ford lost a bid against American rival General Motors for getting a joint venture deal with the Chinese manufacturer SAIC Motor. In 1995, as part of its push for getting new Chinese partners, Ford acquired B shares equivalent to a 20% equity in JMC, becoming the second-largest shareholder. In 1996, JMC began selling its products in overseas markets, initially Egypt and the Middle East. As of 2021, the largest overseas market by volume for JMC is Chile. In 1997, JMC and Ford started the production of their first joint product, the Ford Transit, with JMC supplying various key components (as engines and axles) and Ford the design. In 1998, after JMC issued additional B shares, Ford upped its stake to 30%. In 2013, Ford purchased more B shares, increasing its stake to over 30%.

In late 2010, Jiangling released the first passenger vehicle of JMC under the newly launched JMC Yusheng sub-brand, the Yusheng S350 SUV.

In 2013, JMC reorganized the heavy truck manufacturer Changan Taiyuan as a wholly owned subsidiary named JMC Heavy Duty Vehicle. In mid-2021, JMC Heavy Duty Vehicle was sold to Volvo Trucks. Volvo Trucks later terminated the acquisition agreement, leaving JMC Heavy Duty Vehicle as a JMC subsidiary. As of May 2023, JMC Heavy Duty Vehicle production and sales are suspended.

In December 2021, JMC and Ford established a Shanghai-based joint venture focused on the production of passenger cars. The venture is called Jiangling Ford Motor Technology (Shanghai) Company (Jiangling Ford). JMC owns a 51% and Ford a 49% of its stake.

== Corporate Leadership ==
=== Chairmen ===
- Wang Xigao (2010–2017)
- Qiu Tiangao (2017–present)

=== Chief Executive Officers/CEOs ===
- Sun Min (1993–2003)
- Yuan-Ching Chen (2005–2019)
- Wen Tao Wang (2019)
- Wong Manto (2019–2021)
- Xiong Chunying (2021–present)

== Products ==
=== JMC (Jiangling) ===
The JMC brand mainly for commercial vehicles

Vans:

- JMC E-Lushun – electric van (for logistics)
- JMC E-Lushun V6 – electric van
- JMC E-Fushun electric van
- JMC Fushun – van
- JMC Teshun – van
- JMC Yunba – commercial van
- Jiangling CV9 – minivan

Pickups (JMC pickup):

- JMC Baodian
- JMC Grand Avenue (rebadged Dadao)
- JMC Yuhu
- JMC Yuhu 3
- JMC Yuhu 5
- JMC Yuhu 7
- JMC Yuhu 9
- JMC Yuhu EV

SUVs:

- JMC BaoWei – mid-size SUV

Light trucks (JMC Qingka, Jiangling Light Truck) up to 6 tons:

- JMC Conquer (Kairui and Kairui 800)
- JMC Carrying (Kaiyun)
- JMC Shunda
- JMC Shunda EV

Medium-duty trucks (up to 14 ton):

- JMC Convey (Kaiwei)
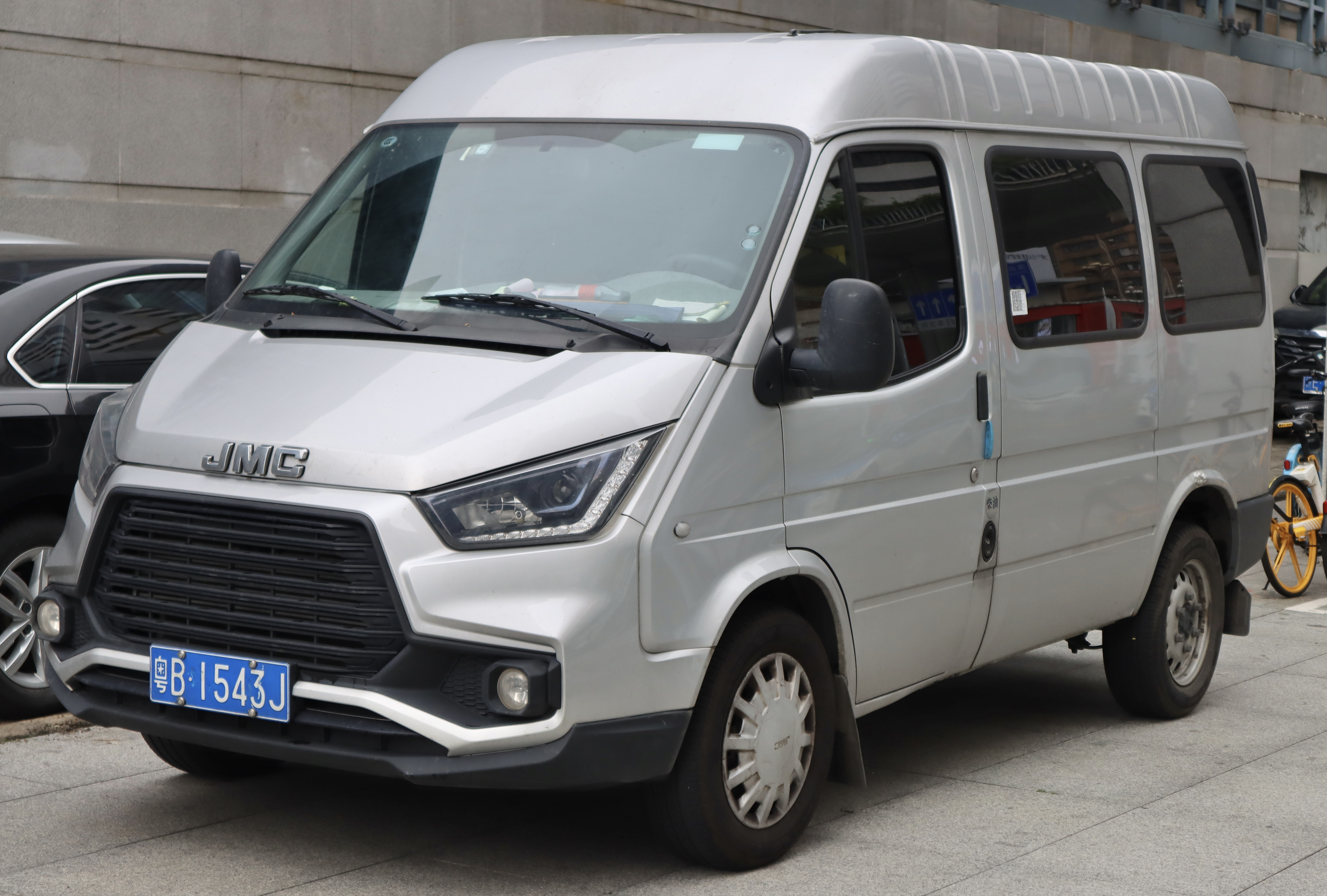
JMC Teshun

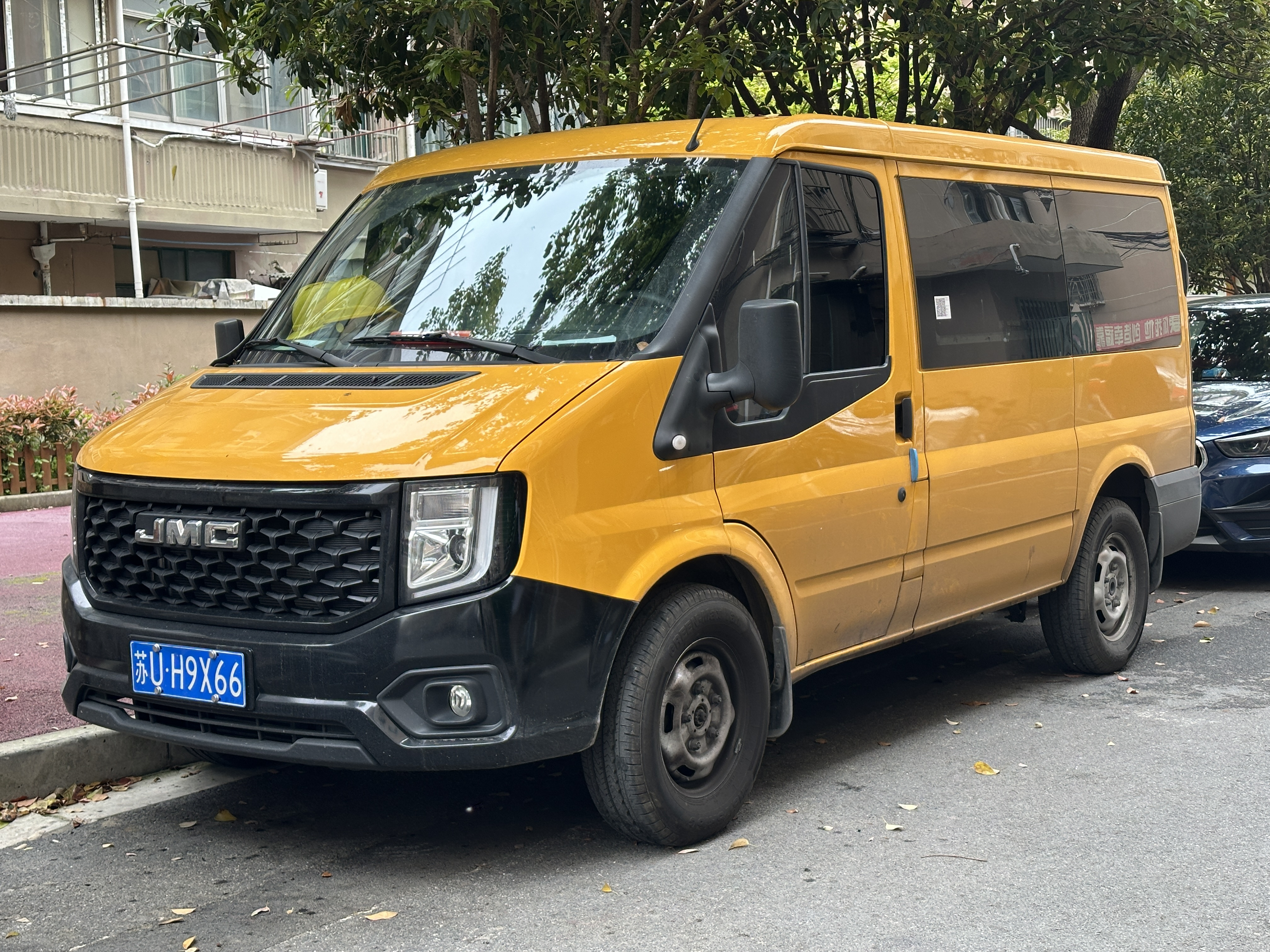
JMC Fushun

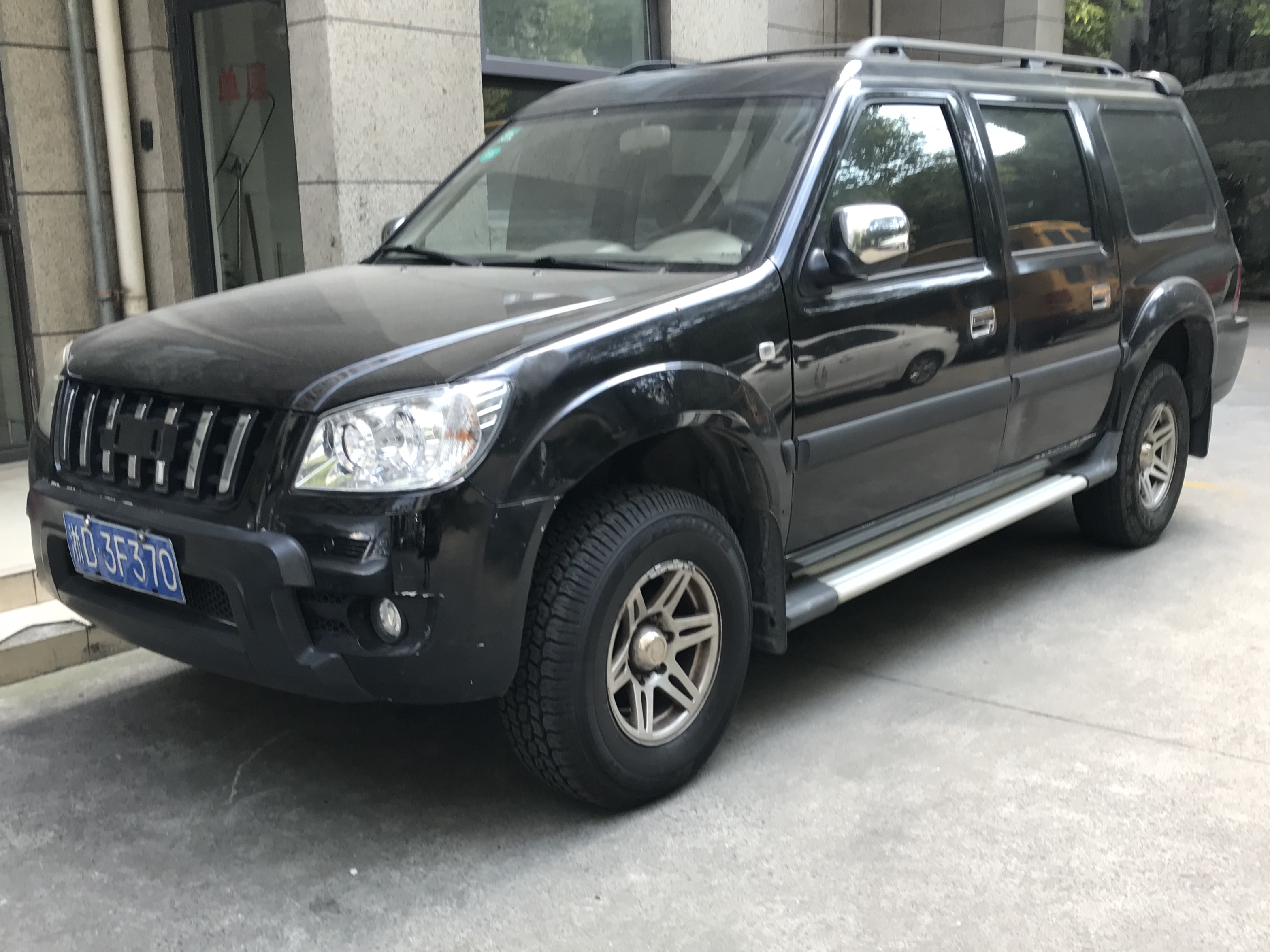
JMC Baowei

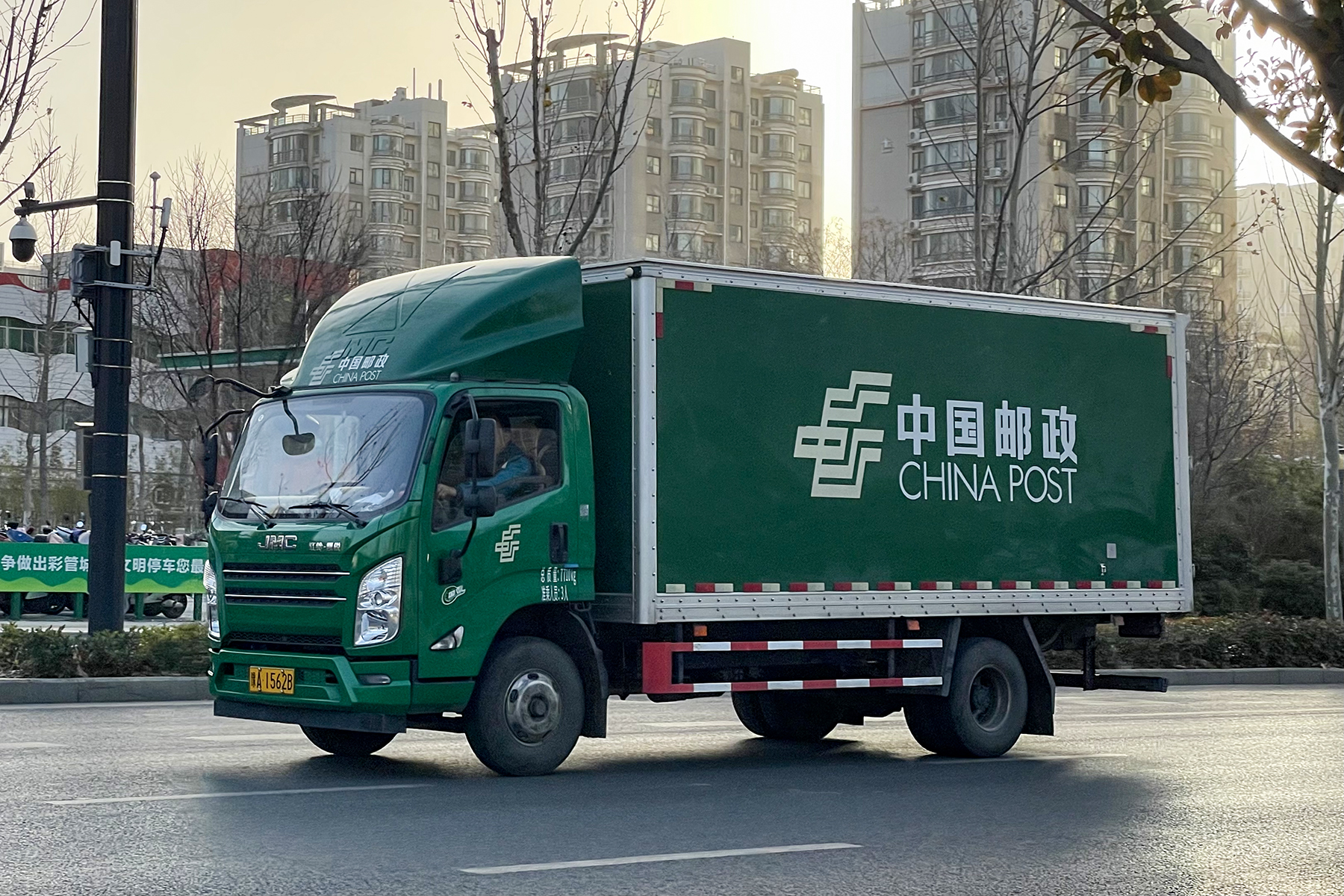
JMC Kairui

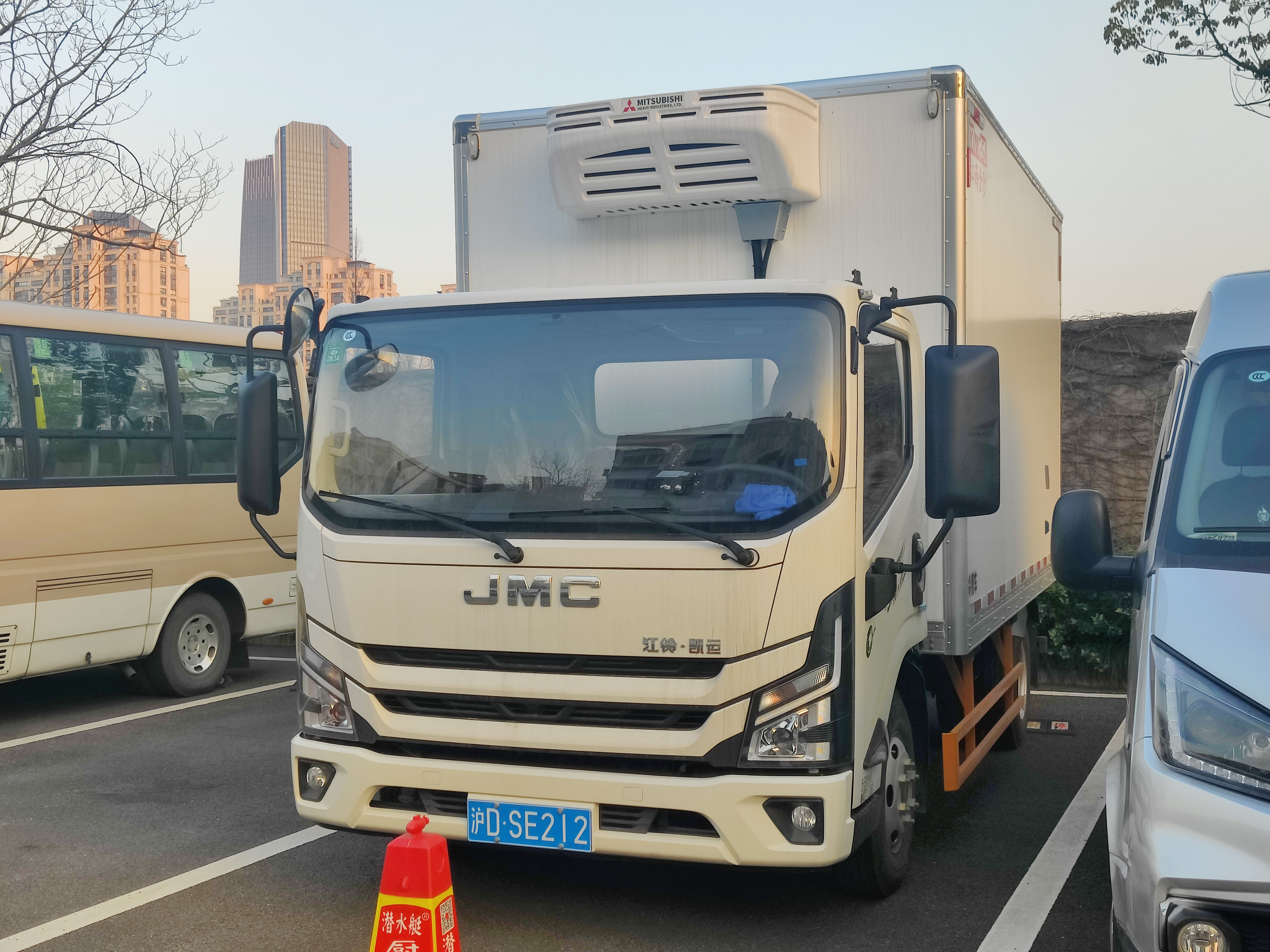
JMC Kaiyun

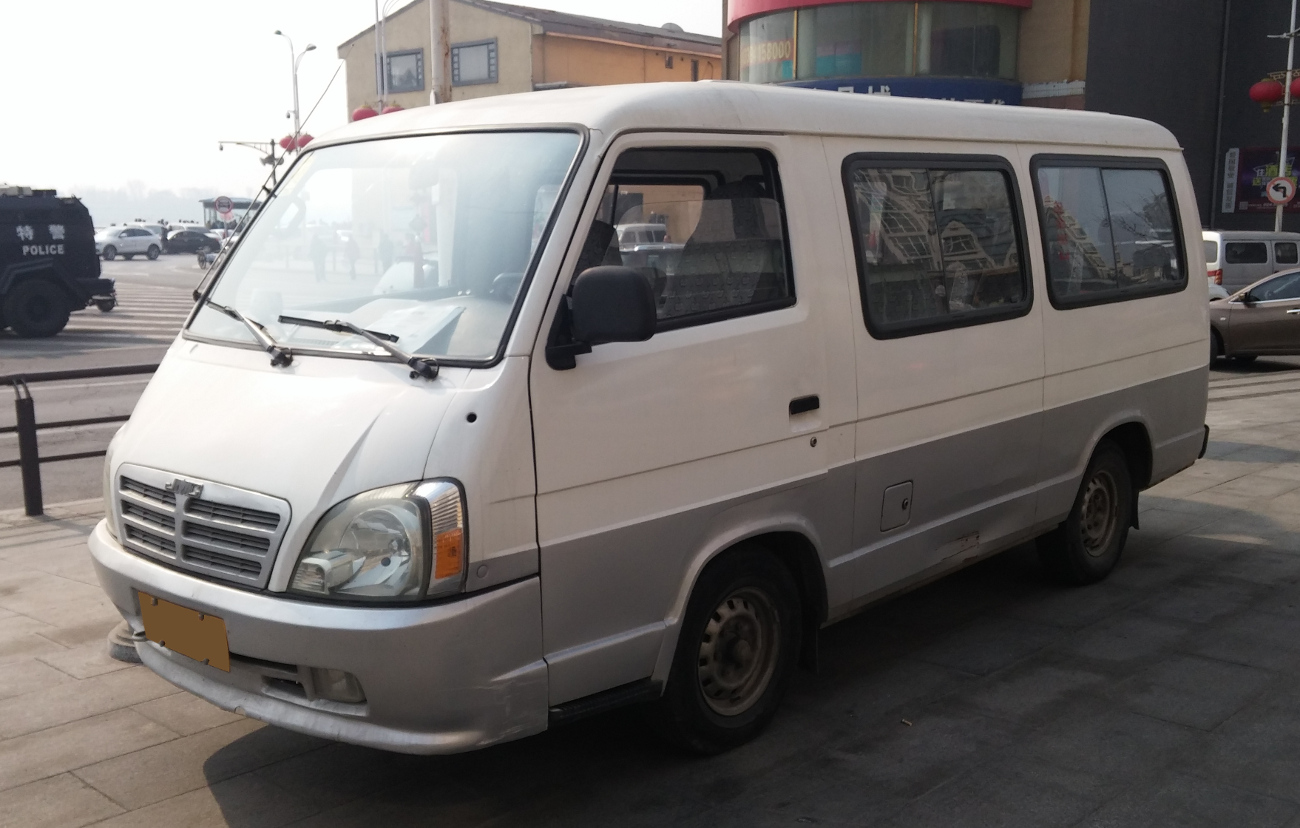
JMC Yunba

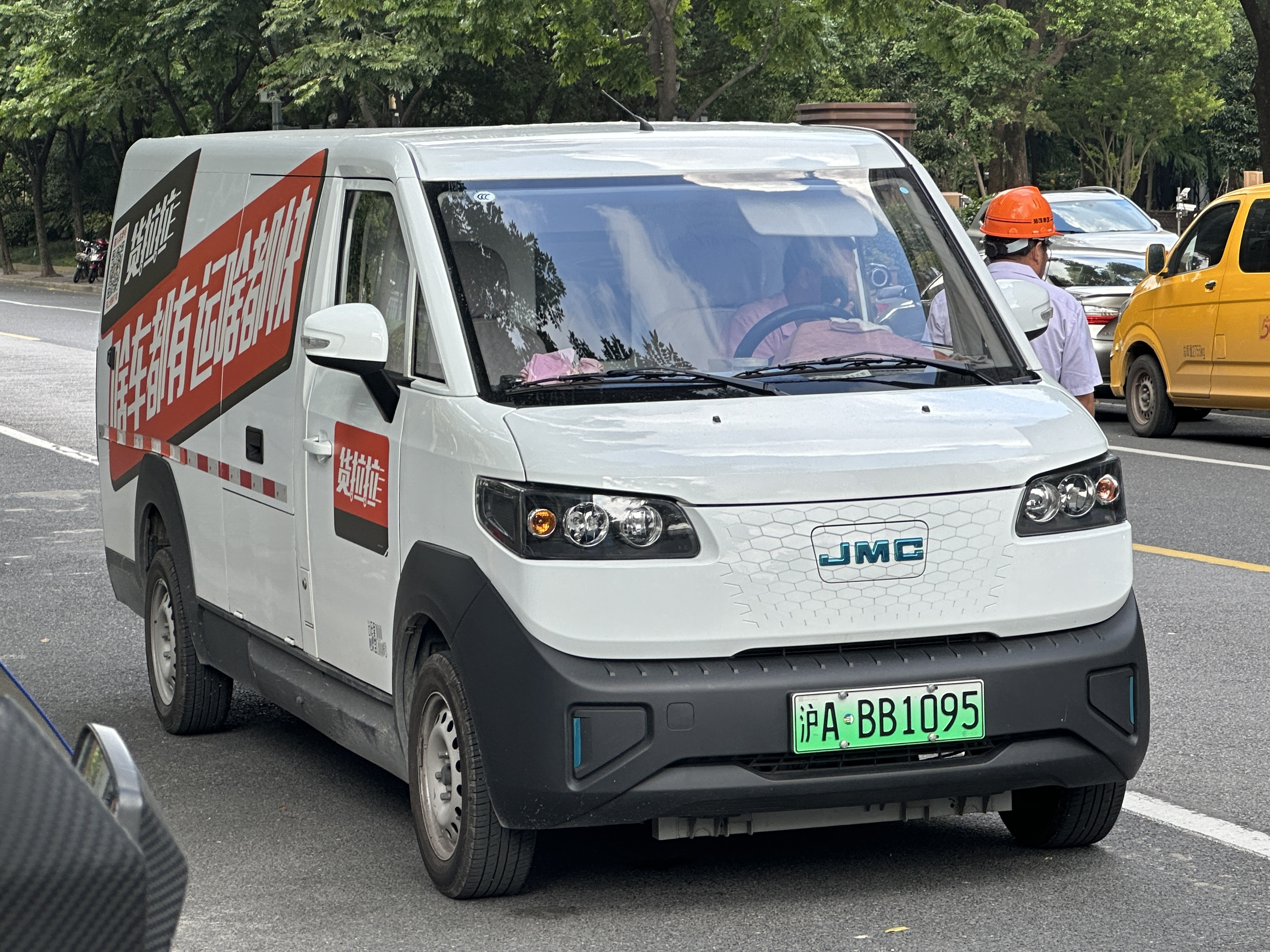
JMC E-Lushun

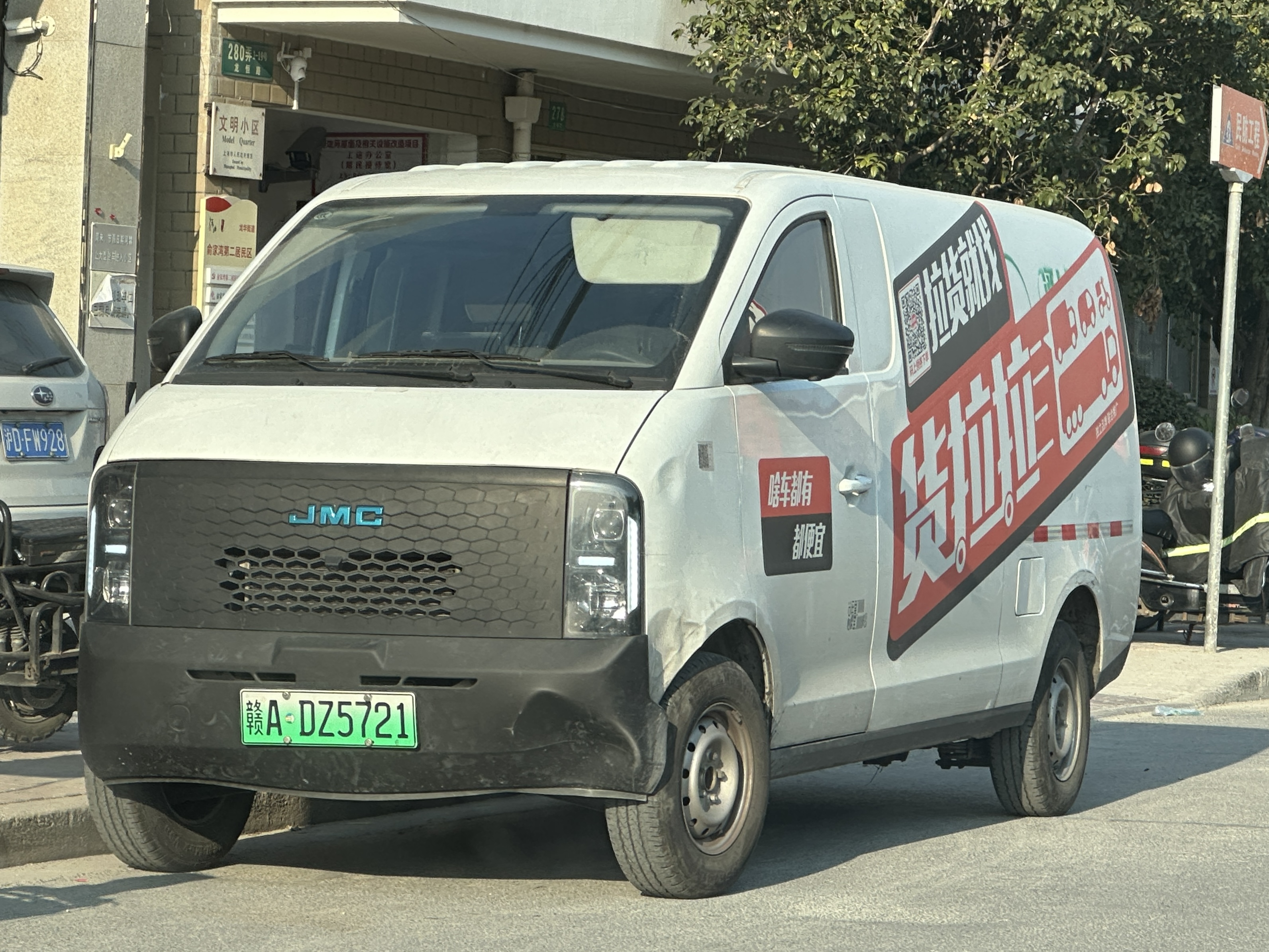
JMC E-Lushun V6

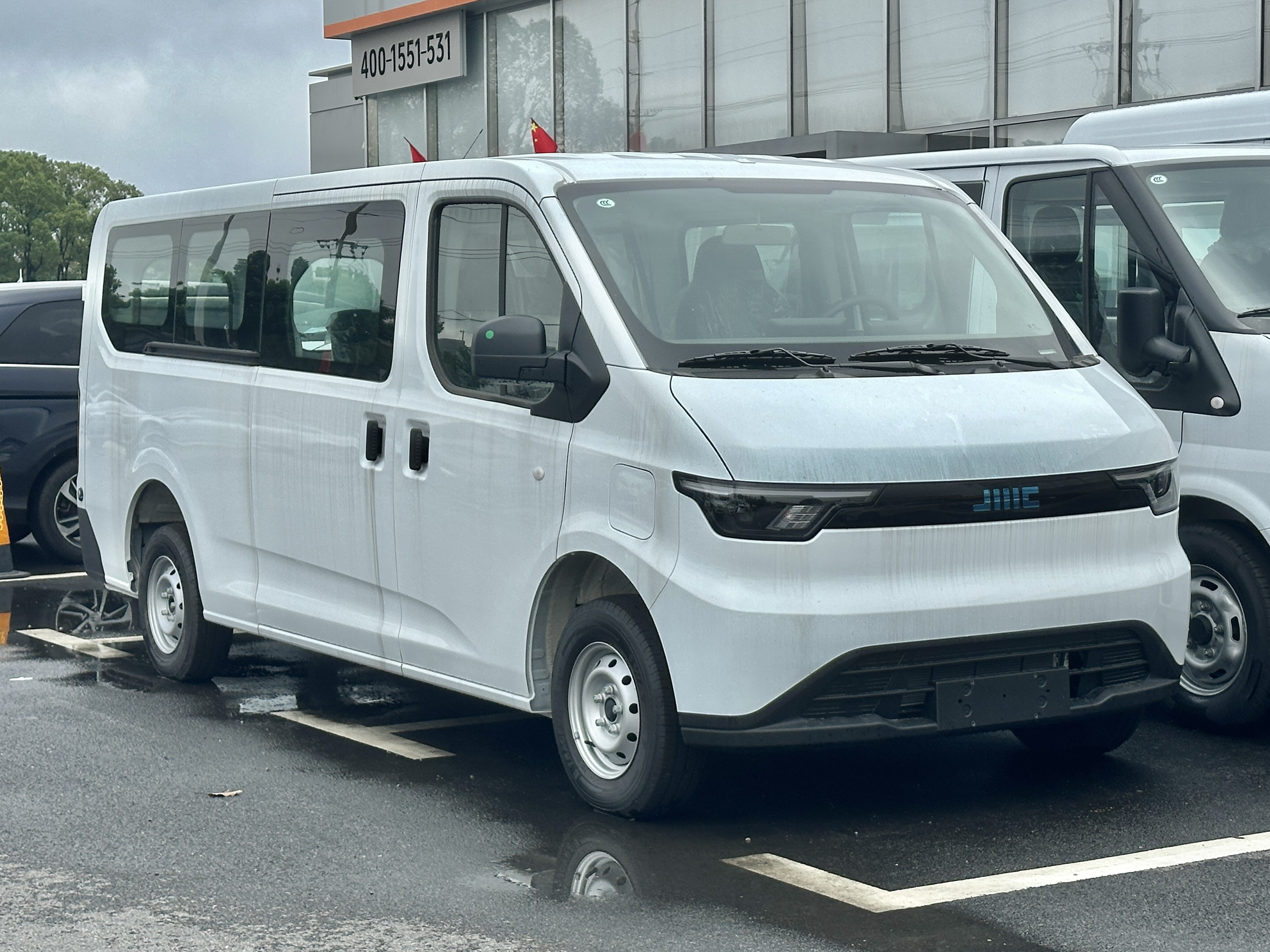
JMC E-Fushun

=== Yusheng ===
Yusheng is a brand for passenger vehicles.

- Yusheng S330 – compact crossover
- Yusheng S350 – mid-size crossover
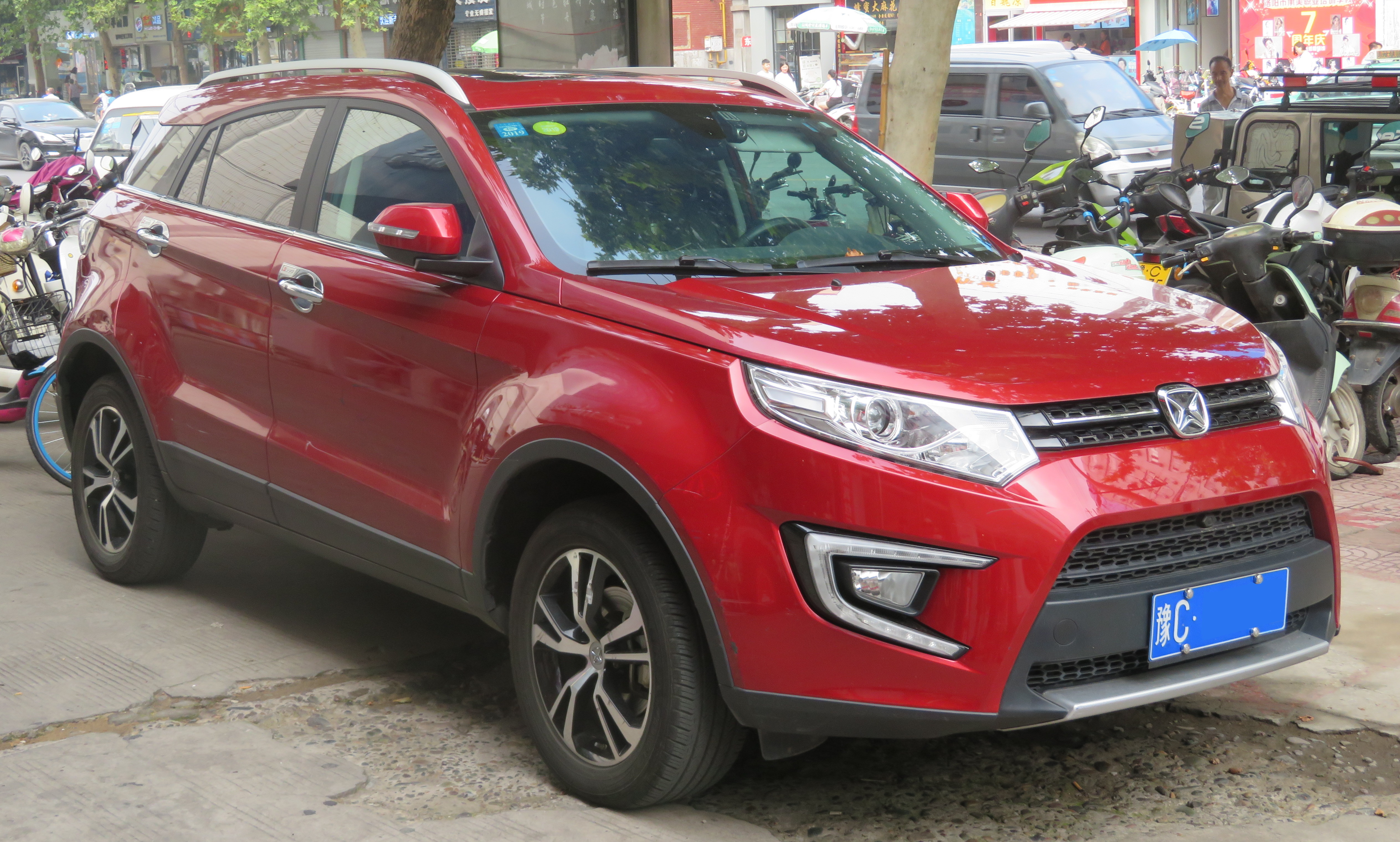
Yusheng S330

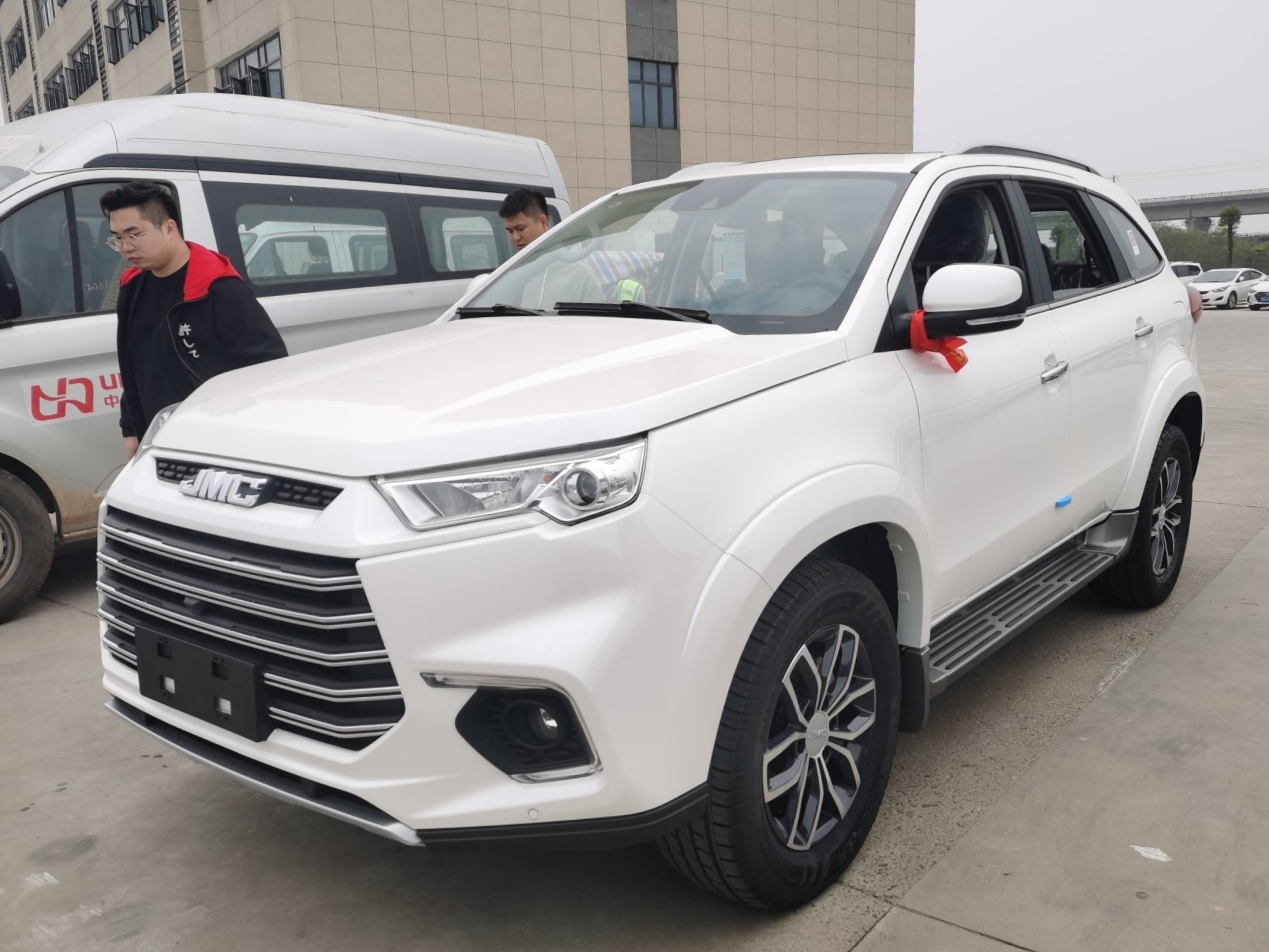
Yusheng S350

=== Lexing ===
In June 2023, JMC unveiled Lexing (Chinese: 乐行; pinyin: Lèxíng; lit. 'Happy travel'), its first sub-brand aimed to only be used on new energy vehicles, and presented its first model, an electric light truck.

- Lexing E-Road
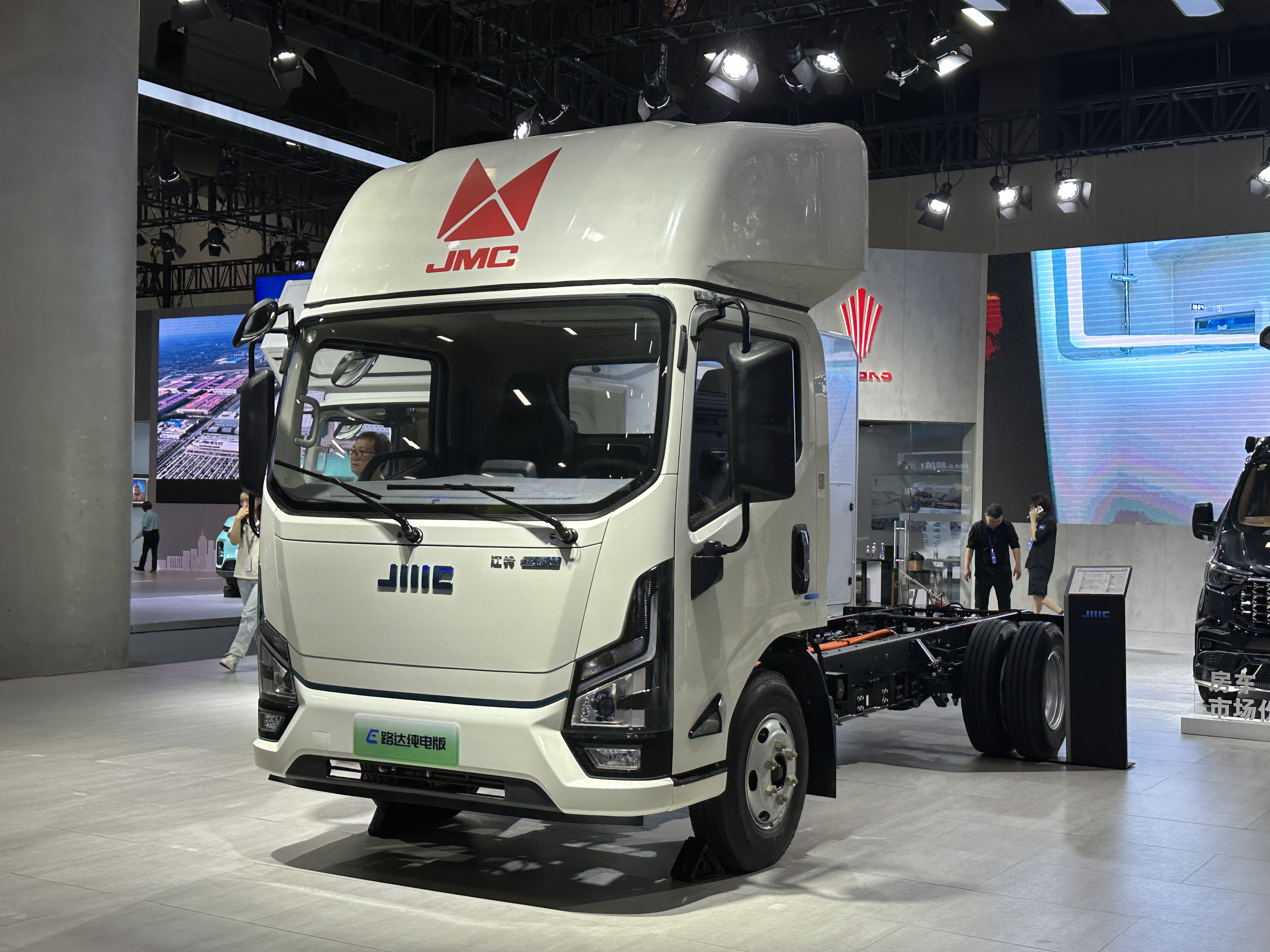
Lexing E-Road

=== Dadao ===
Dadao (Chinese: 大道; pinyin: Dàdào; lit. 'Big road') is a brand for pickup trucks and SUVs. Launched in 2023.

- Dadao Mohe – pickup truck
- Dadao EV – electric pickup truck
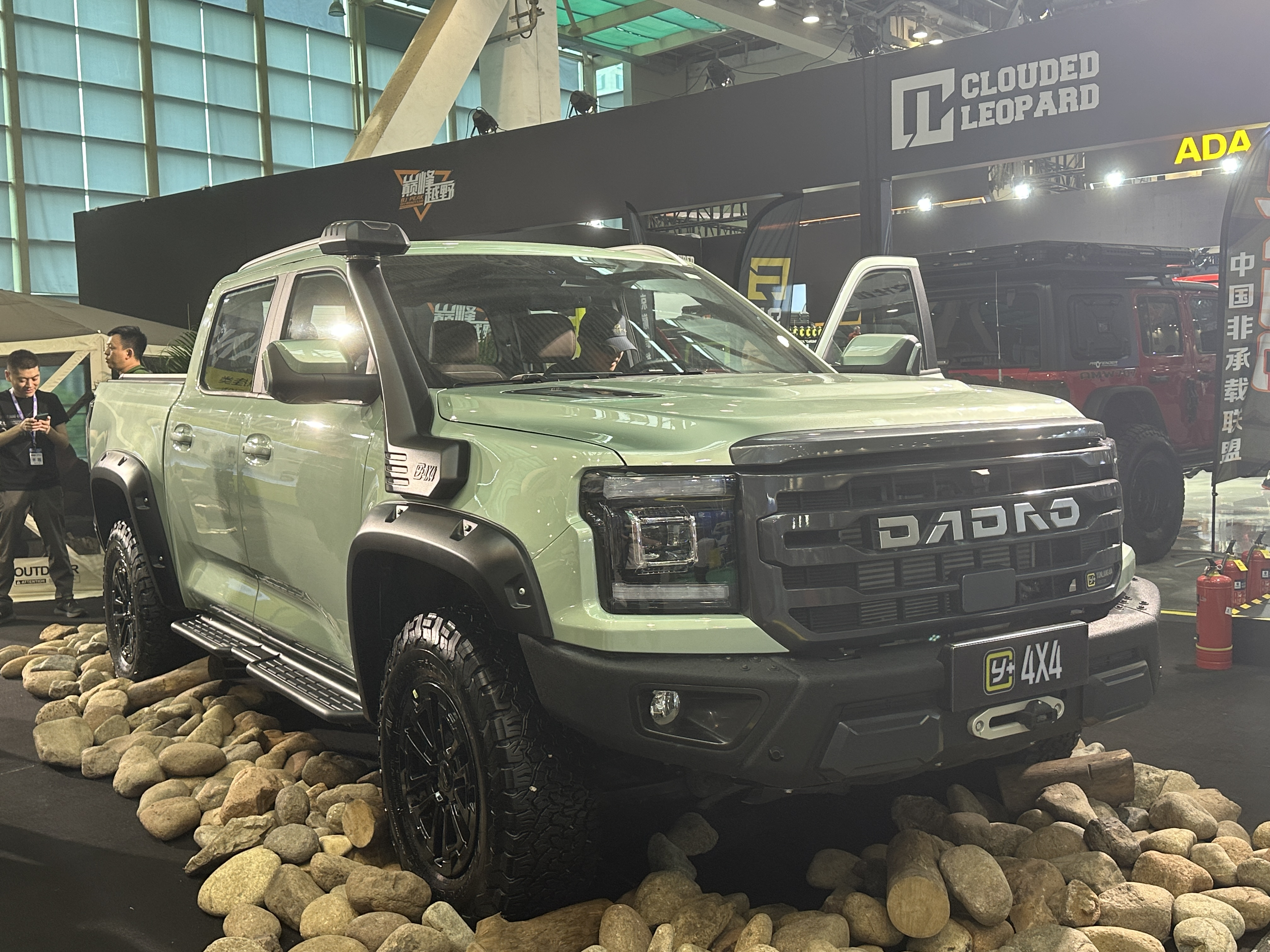
Dadao Mohe

=== Ford ===
- JMC Transit – minibus (developed by Ford and JMC jointly)
- JMC E-series SVO – based on Ford E-series vans:
  - E350 Communication/Command Vehicle
  - E250 Luxury Business Vehicle
  - E350 Investigation Vehicle
  - E350 Anti-riot Assault Vehicle
- Ford Equator – mid-size crossover
- Ford Equator Sport – compact crossover
- Ford Everest – mid-size SUV (Discontinued)
- Ford Bronco New Energy – mid-size crossover
- Ford Territory – compact crossover (Export)
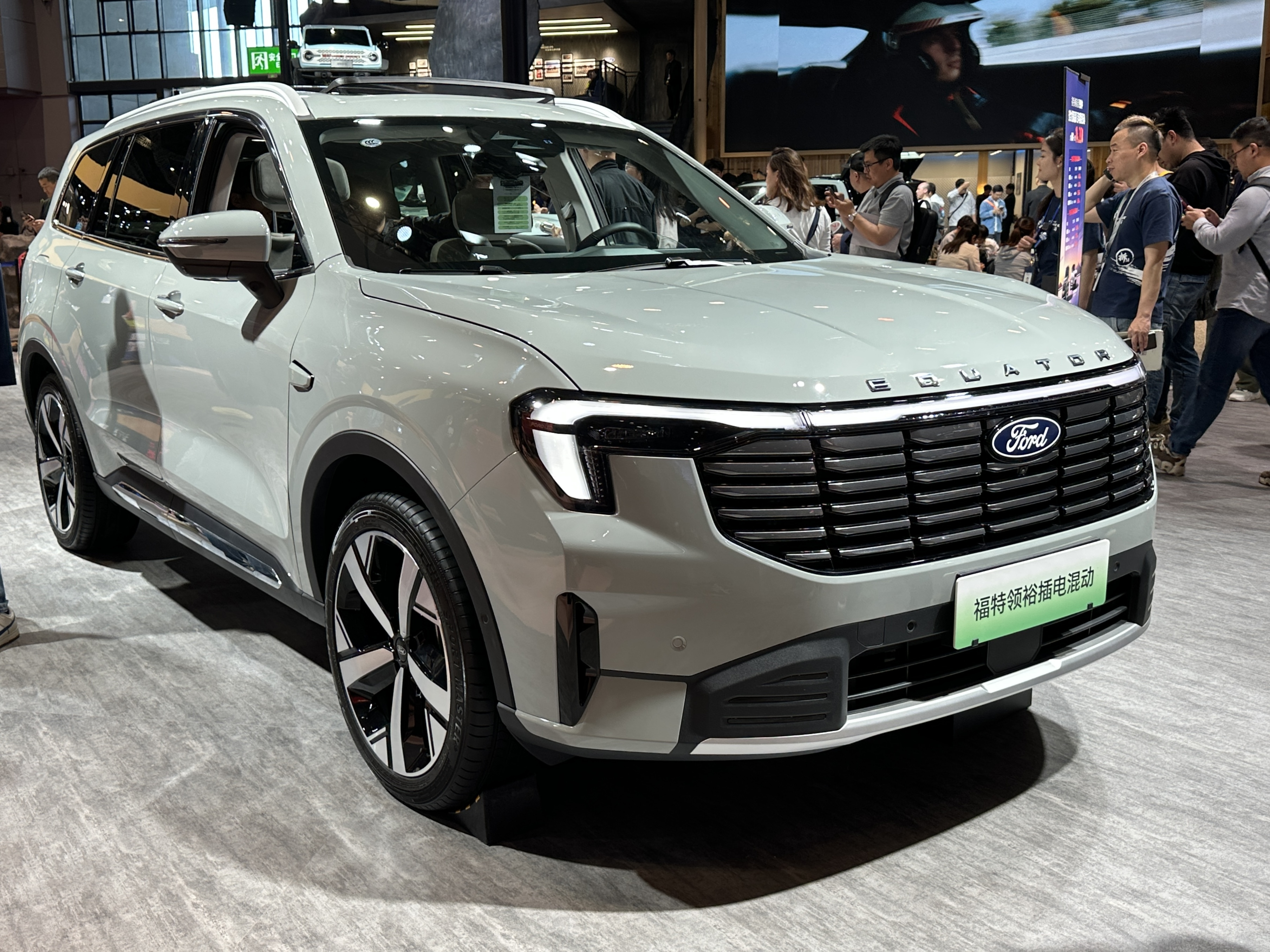
Ford Equator

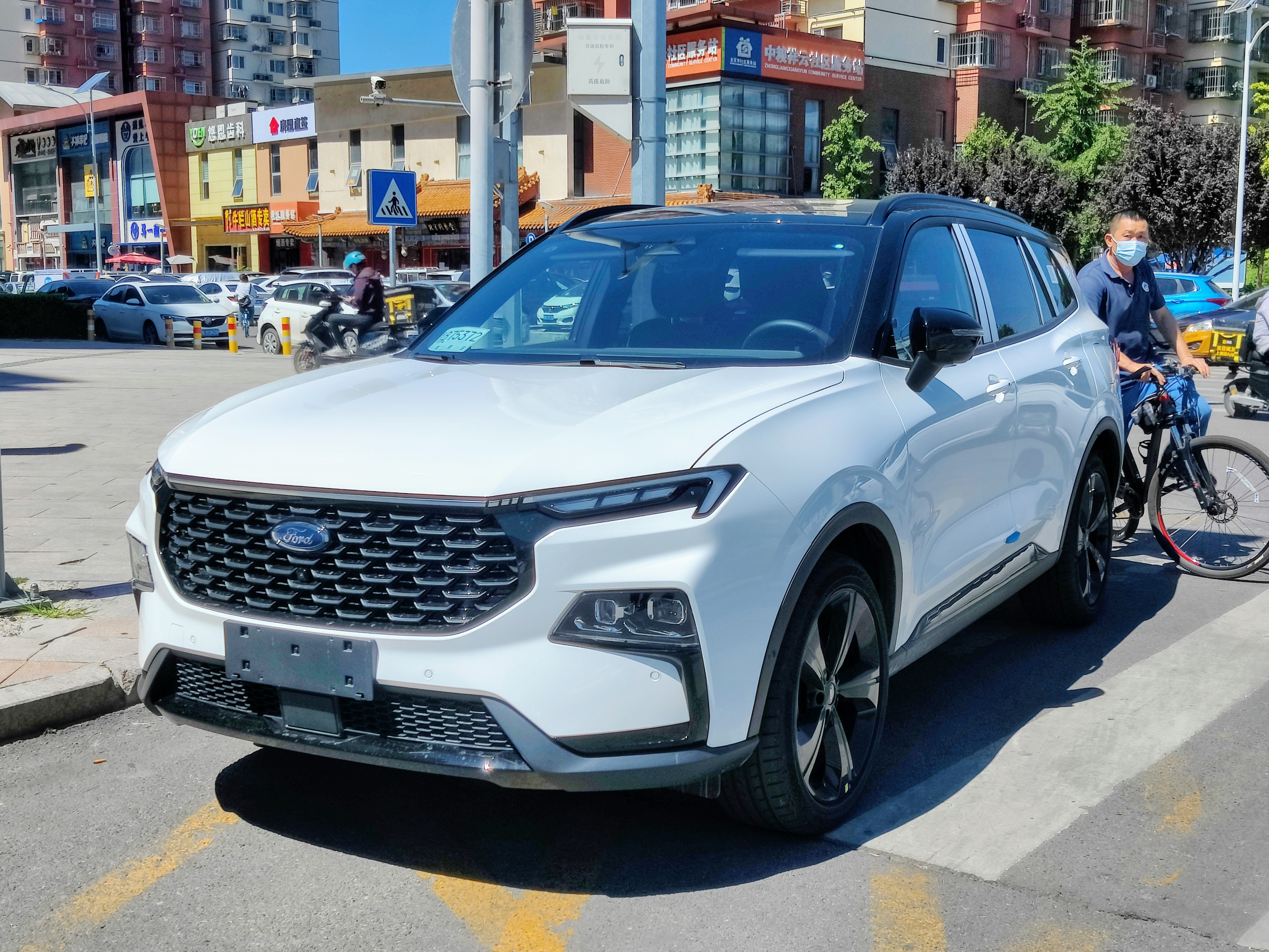
Ford Equator Sport

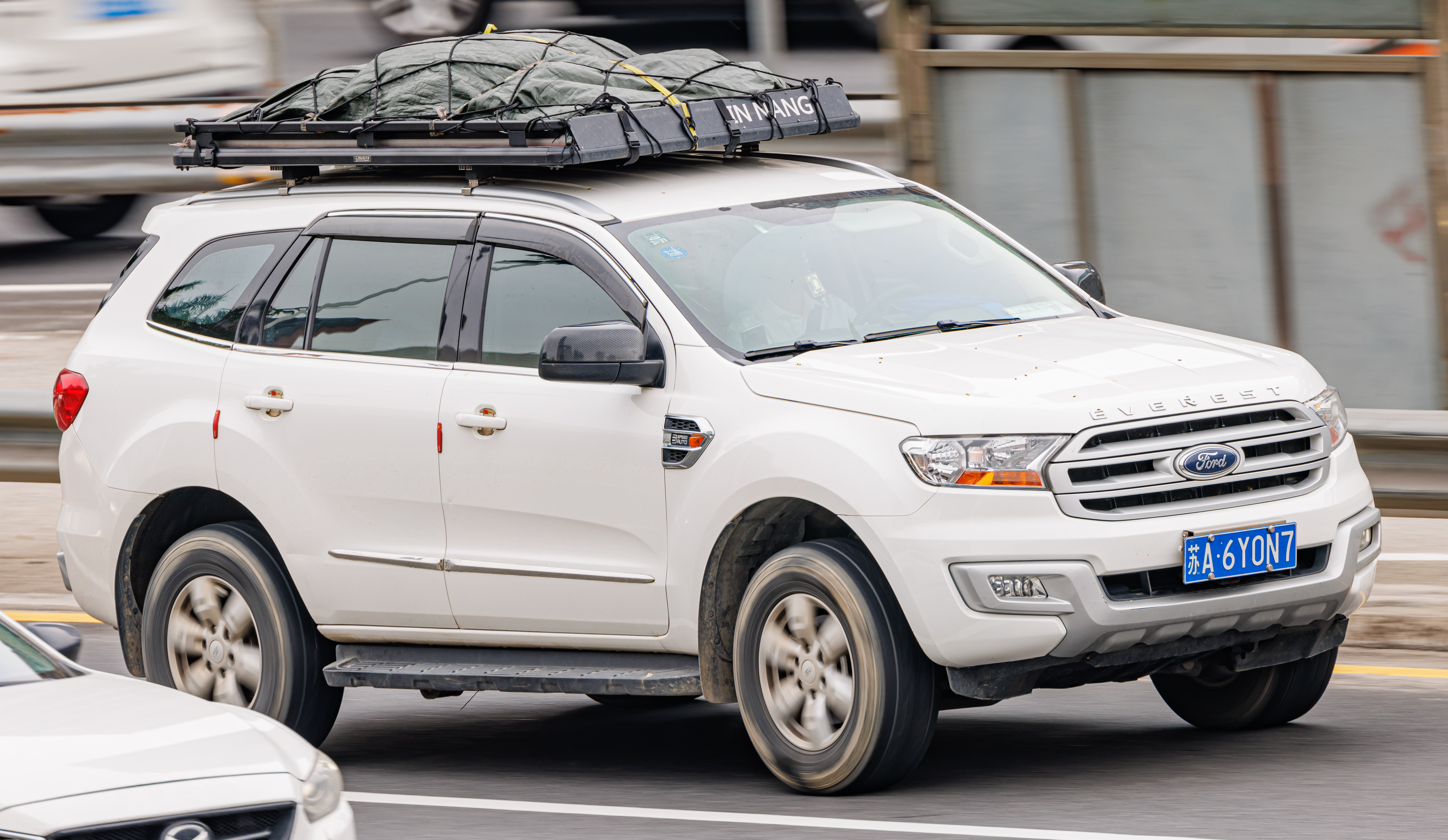
Ford Everest

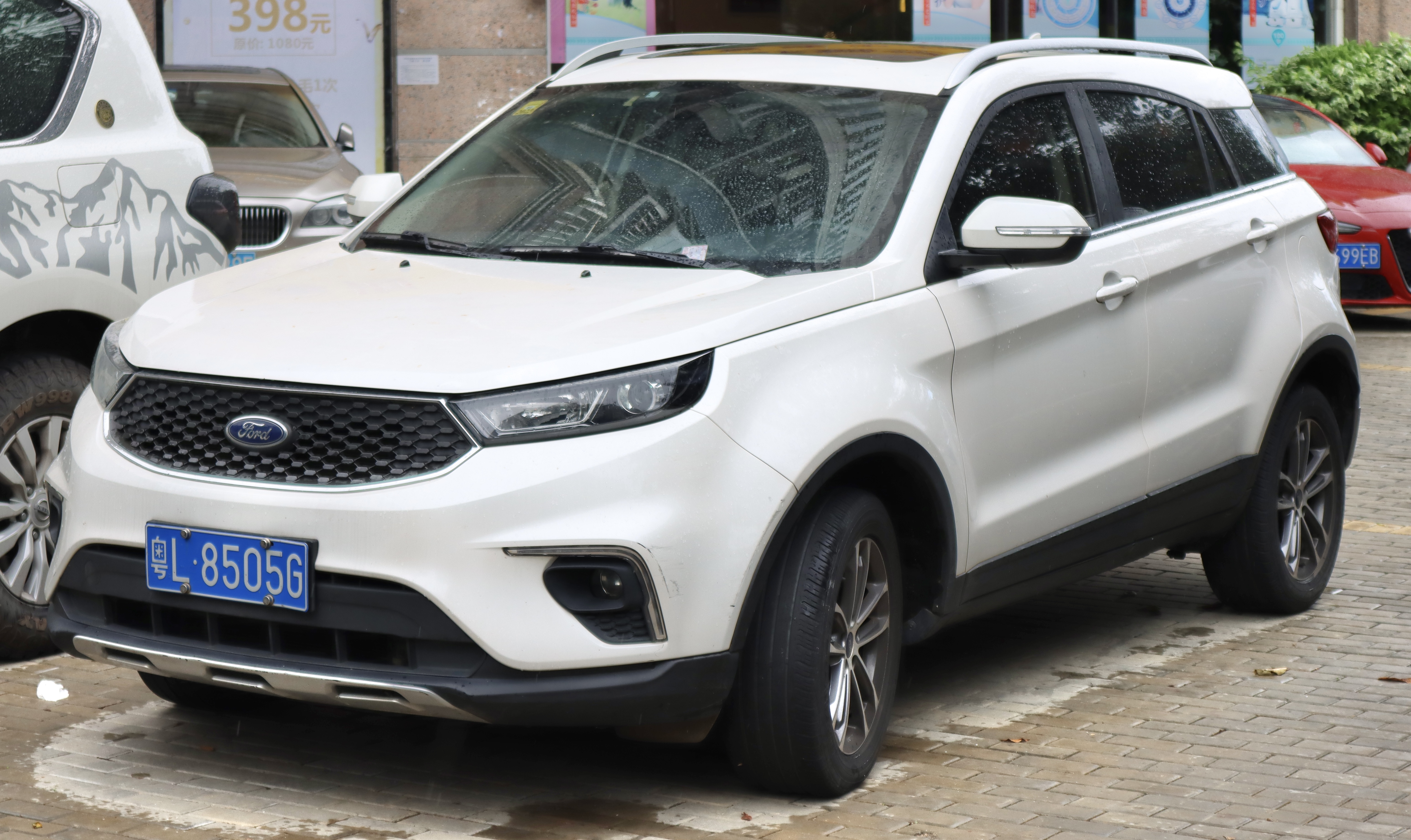
Ford Territory

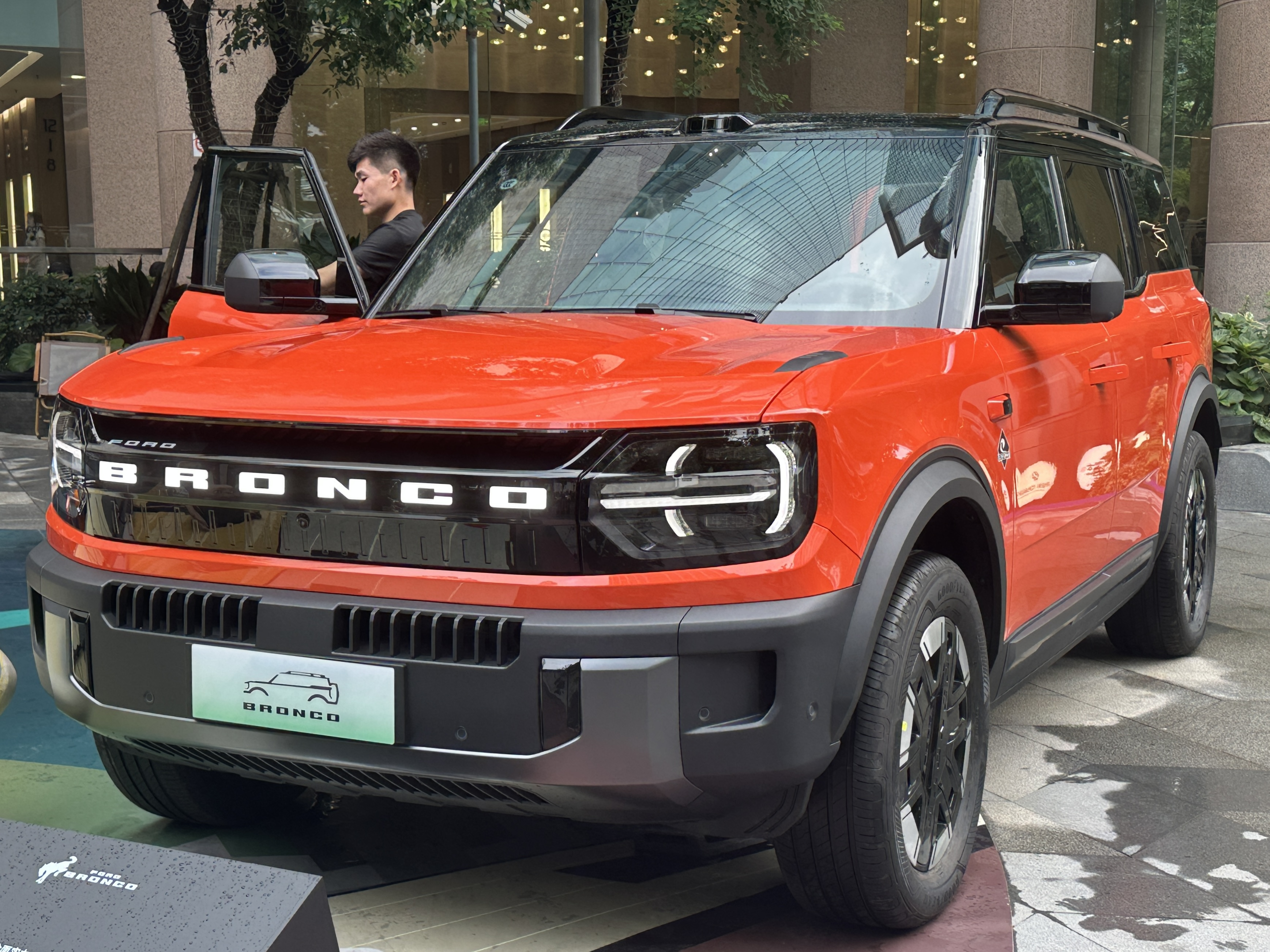
Ford Bronco New Energy

== Former joint venture ==
The logo of Ford Beyond

In January 2022, Ford and JMC announced the establishment of Jiangling Ford (江铃福特) Automobile Technology (Shanghai) Co., Ltd, a 49:51 joint venture to distribute Ford brand's passenger vehicle in China under Ford Beyond (福特纵横) brand. Since Ford Motor Company holds a 32% stake in JMC, the controlling shareholder of the joint venture, after equity piercing, Ford actually holds 65.32% of the company's shares, making it a substantially foreign-controlled enterprise.

The Ford Beyond is merely a distribution channel brand, its product are sourced from JMC or directly imported.

On April 16, 2026, Jiangling Motors officially confirmed that Jiangling Ford Automobile Technology has completely ceased operations and has begun liquidation and deregistration, becoming the shortest-lived foreign-invested joint venture in the history of China's automotive industry.

=== Ford Beyond product ===
- Ford Ranger
- Ford Bronco
- Ford Bronco New Energy
- Ford Equator
- Ford Equator Sport/Territory
- Ford Raptor (imported)

== Production ==
JMC produces vehicles under the JMC, JMC Yusheng, Ford and other brands and sub-brands. It has assembly plants around Nanchang (at Qingyunpu and the Xiaolan Economic Zone). JMC also has a new energy vehicle plant (the Fushan plant) in the Xiaolan Economic Zone.

== Sales ==
The following table includes a list of annual sales according to company's data.

Sales of Jiangling Motors
Year	Total	JMC	Yusheng	JMC Heavy Duty	Ford
2010	178,999	126,641	-	-	52,358
2011	194,588	135,993	-	-	58,595
2012	200,008	134,485	8,346	-	57,177
2013	230,006	148,061	14,160	392	67,785
2014	275,858	177,036	26,708	38	72,076
2015	262,756	165,512	19,651	33	77,560
2016	281,019	163,219	37,346	52	80,402
2017	310,028	211,672	29,151	636	68,569
2018	285,066	218,257	6,892	1,516	58,401
2019	290,058	189,317	1,551	1,080	98,110
2020	331,098	undisclosed			
2021	341,008	undisclosed			
2022	282,008	undisclosed			
2023	310,008	undisclosed			
2024	341,208	undisclosed			
2025	377,253	undisclosed			

Although Jiangling Motor is a public-listed company in which Ford Motor Company only holds a minority stake, the former's sales volume is consolidated into the latter's.

== See also ==
- List of Chinese auto companies
