= JMC Shunda =

Series of light trucks by JMC

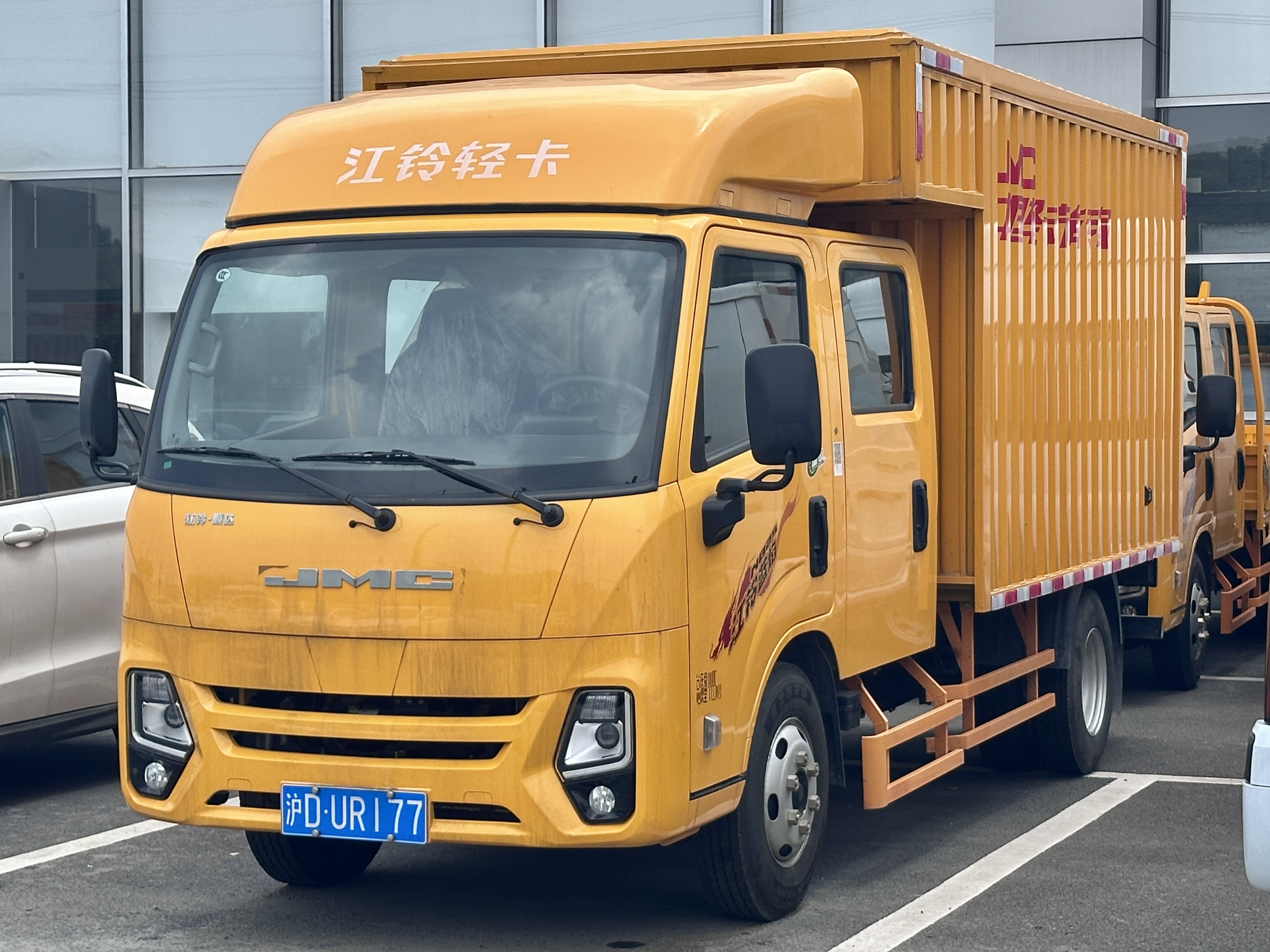

Overview
- Manufacturer: JMC
- Production: 1997–present

Body and chassis
- Class: Light commercial truck
- Body style: Cab-over truck (single and double cab; flatbed/box variants)
- Related: JMC Kaiyun; JMC Kairui

The JMC Shunda (Chinese: 江铃顺达) is a series of light commercial trucks produced by JMC since 1997. It serves as JMC’s entry-level light-duty truck line, positioned below the JMC Kaiyun and JMC Kairui models. Designed for urban logistics, small-scale transport, and construction utility, the Shunda has evolved through four generations with incremental increases in size, power, and refinement.

== First generation (1997–2004) ==
First generation
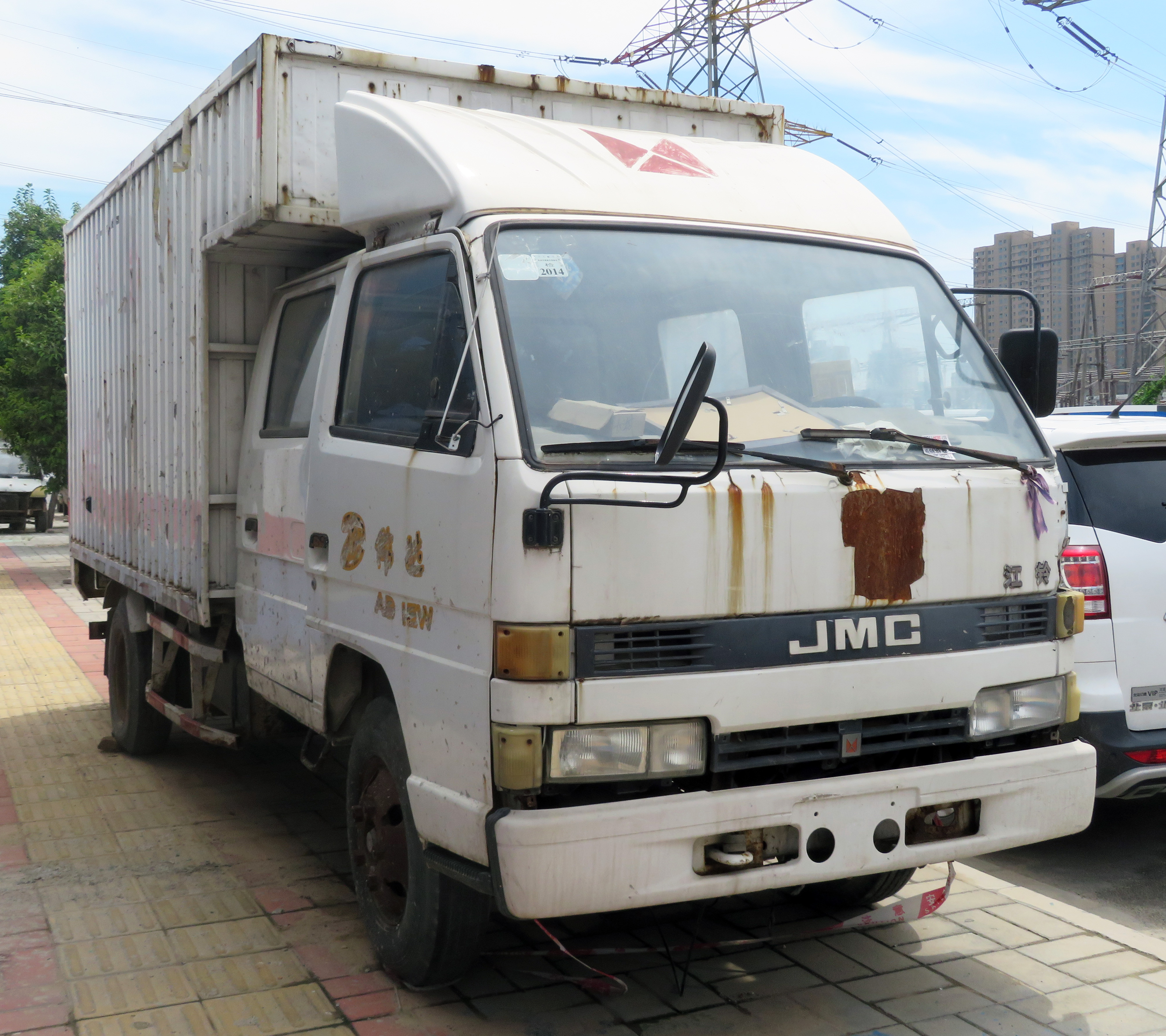

Overview
- Production: 1997–2004
- Assembly: China: Nanchang, Jiangxi

Body and chassis
- Body style: Cab-over light truck
- Layout: Front-engine, rear-wheel drive

Powertrain
- Engine: 2.8 L JX493 diesel
- Transmission: 5-speed manual

Dimensions
- Wheelbase: 2,810 mm
- Length: 5,080 mm
- Width: 1,745 mm
- Height: 2,040 mm
- Curb weight: 2,300 kg (GVW)

The first-generation Shunda was launched in 1997 as JMC’s first independently developed light truck. Mechanically derived from older Isuzu-based chassis technology, it featured the in-house JX493 2.8-litre diesel engine paired with a five-speed manual transmission. The cab’s upright design maximised cargo length while maintaining a compact footprint for narrow urban streets. The truck quickly became popular among domestic delivery operators for its reliability and low operating costs.

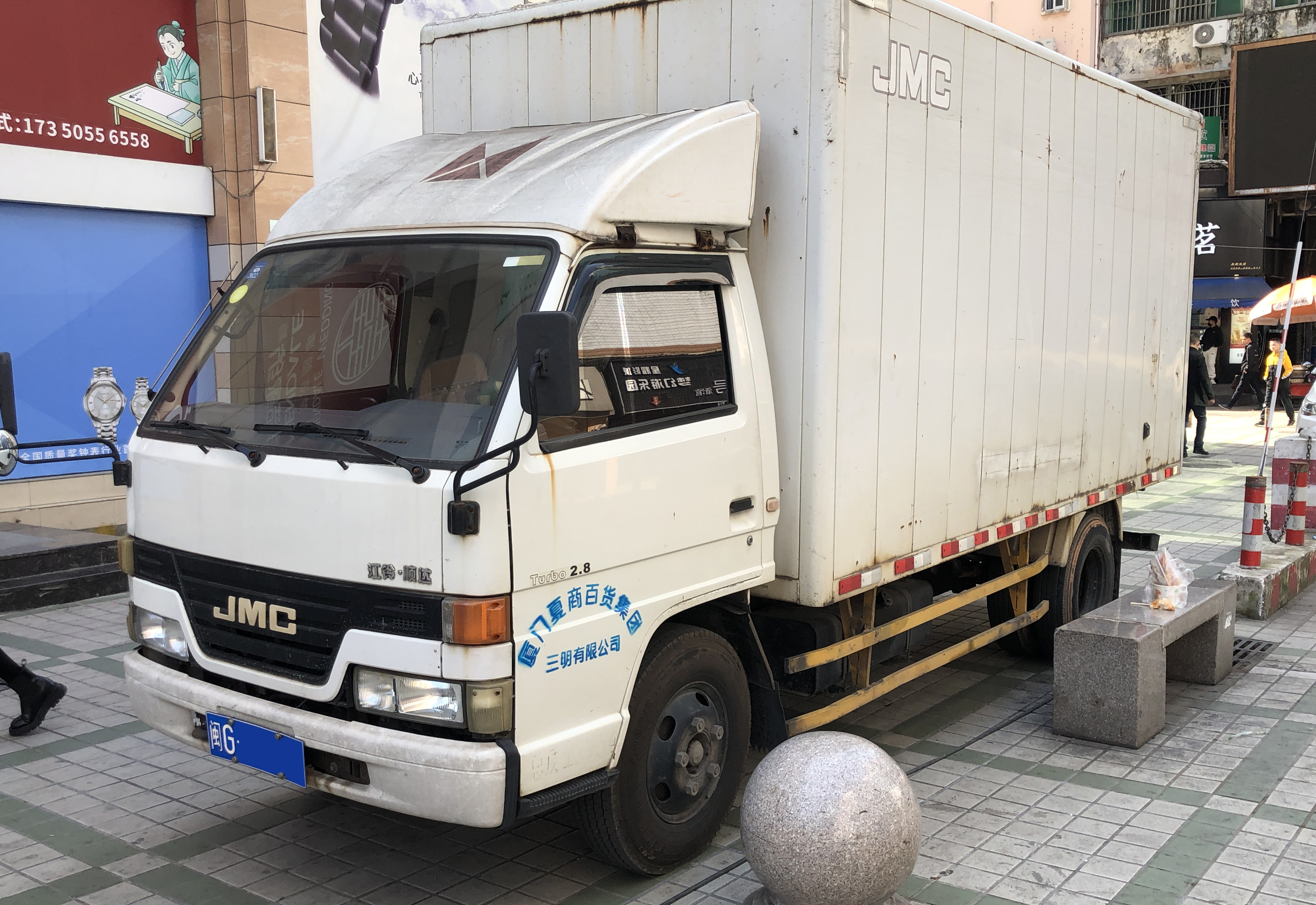
First generation JMC Shunda (facelift)

== Second generation (2004–2010) ==
Second generation
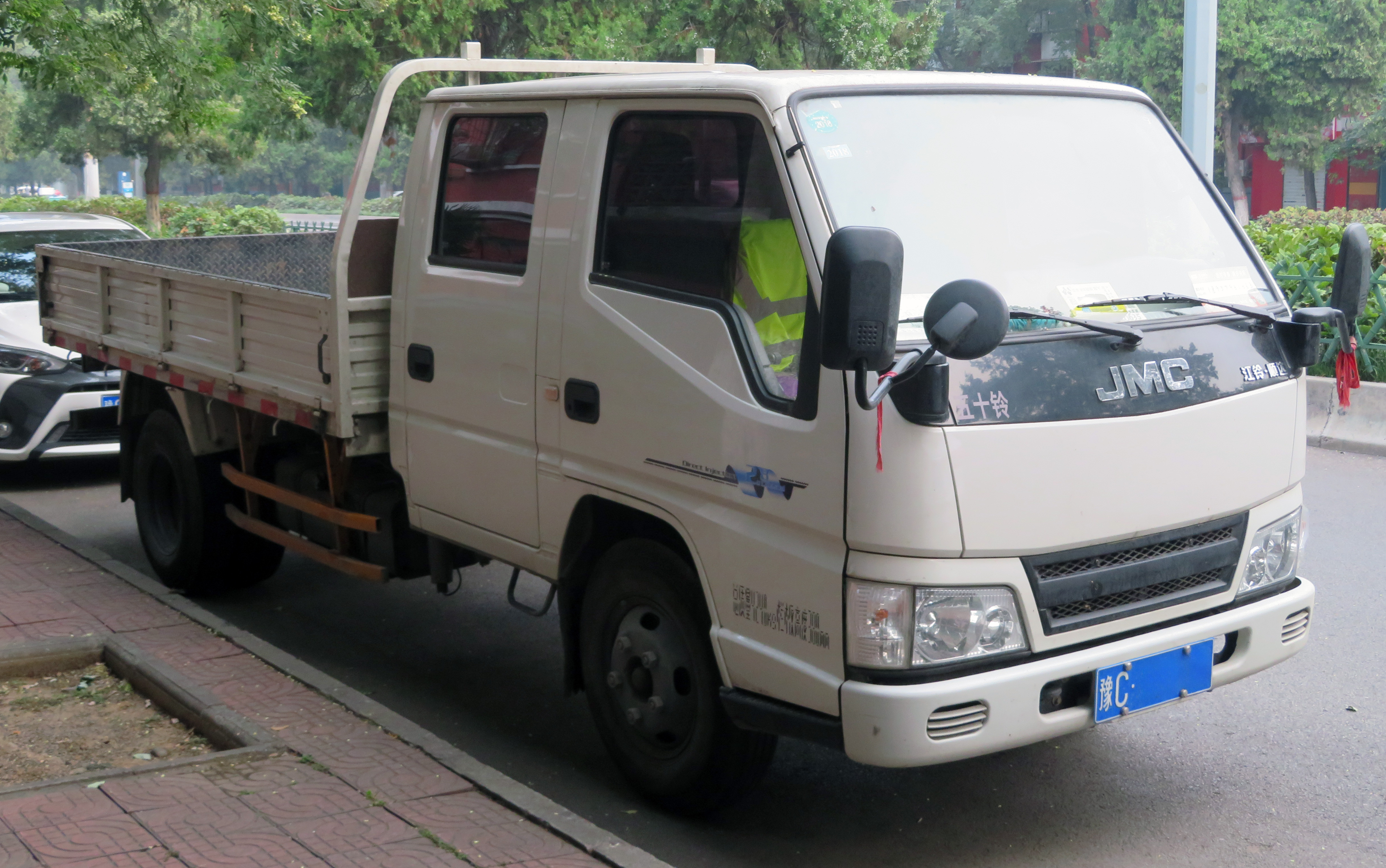

Overview
- Production: 2004–2010
- Assembly: China: Nanchang, Jiangxi

Body and chassis
- Body style: Cab-over light truck
- Layout: Front-engine, rear-wheel drive

Powertrain
- Engine: 2.8 L JX493ZLQ3 diesel
- Transmission: 5-speed manual

Dimensions
- Wheelbase: 2,850–2,900 mm
- Length: 5,180–5,380 mm
- Width: 1,785 mm
- Height: 2,070 mm
- Curb weight: 2,600–2,800 kg (GVW)

The 2004 redesign introduced a new front fascia and reinforced ladder frame while retaining the proven drivetrain. Improvements in cab aerodynamics and visibility were reported by contemporary reviews. This generation also introduced optional air-conditioning and hydraulic power steering in higher trims, broadening the truck’s appeal among urban operators.

== Third generation (2010–2016) ==
Third generation
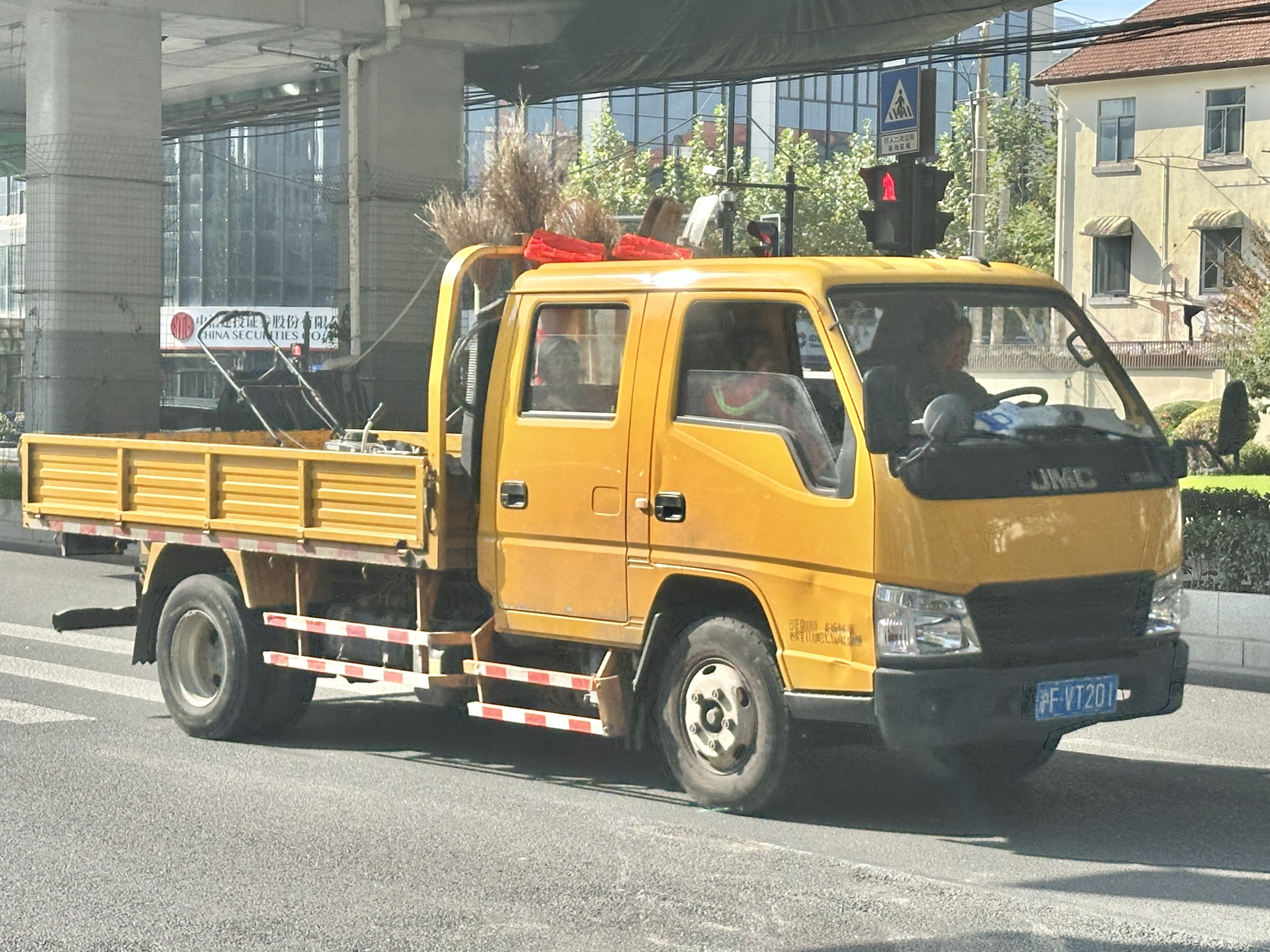

Overview
- Production: 2010–2016
- Assembly: China: Nanchang, Jiangxi

Body and chassis
- Body style: Cab-over light truck
- Layout: Front-engine, rear-wheel drive

Powertrain
- Engine: 2.8/2.9 L Ford Duratorq diesel
- Transmission: 5-speed manual

Dimensions
- Wheelbase: 2,900–3,360 mm
- Length: 5,280–5,450 mm
- Width: 1,845 mm
- Height: 2,150 mm
- Curb weight: 2,900–3,300 kg (GVW)

For 2010 the Shunda received an all-new wide cab and a shift to Ford-derived Duratorq diesel engines. The wider cabin improved shoulder room and noise insulation, and independent test reports noted better refinement and lower emissions. The new front fascia brought the model’s styling closer to the mid-range JMC Kaiyun.

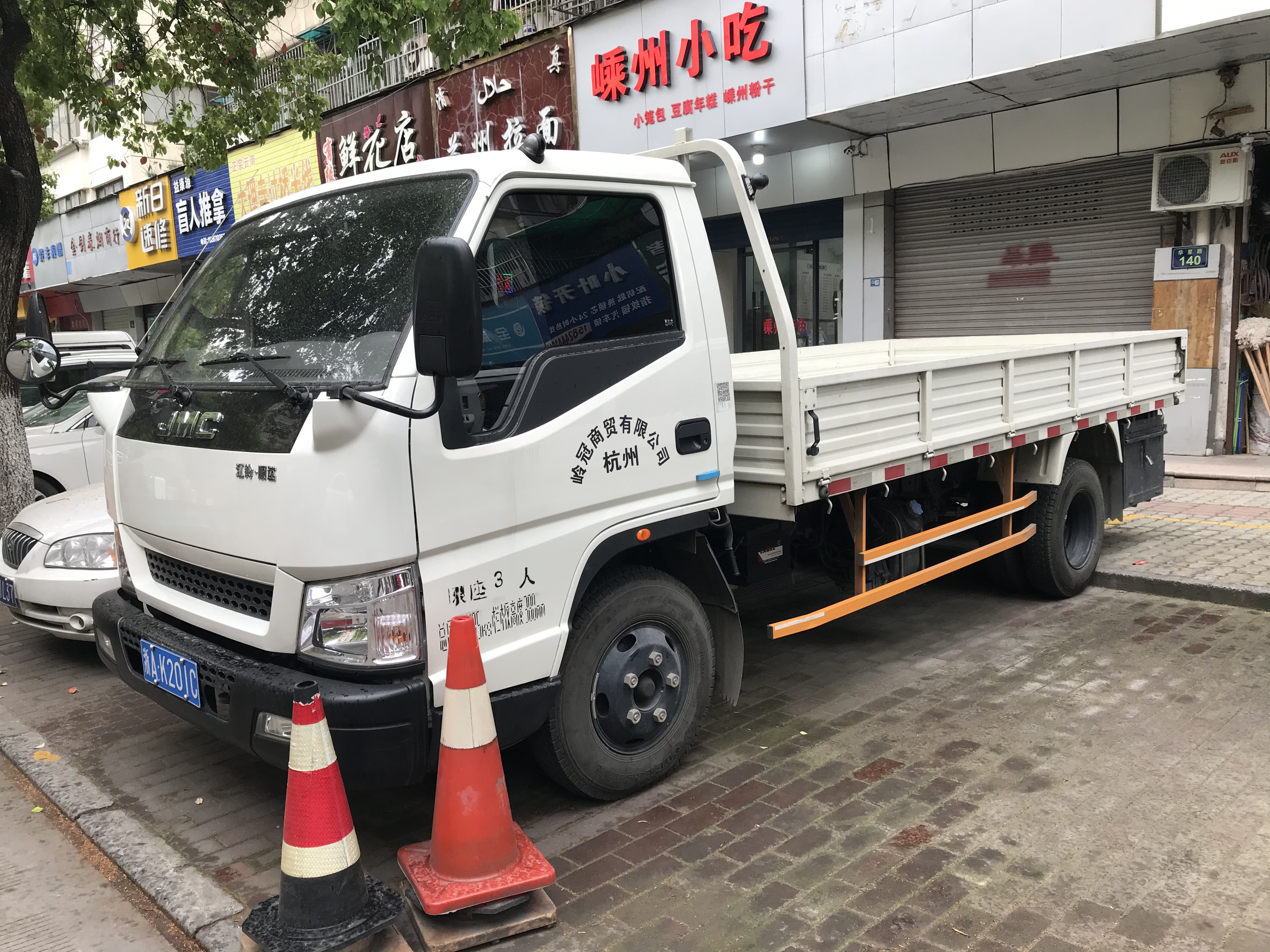
Third generation JMC Shunda single cab pickup

== Fourth generation (2016–present) ==
Fourth generation
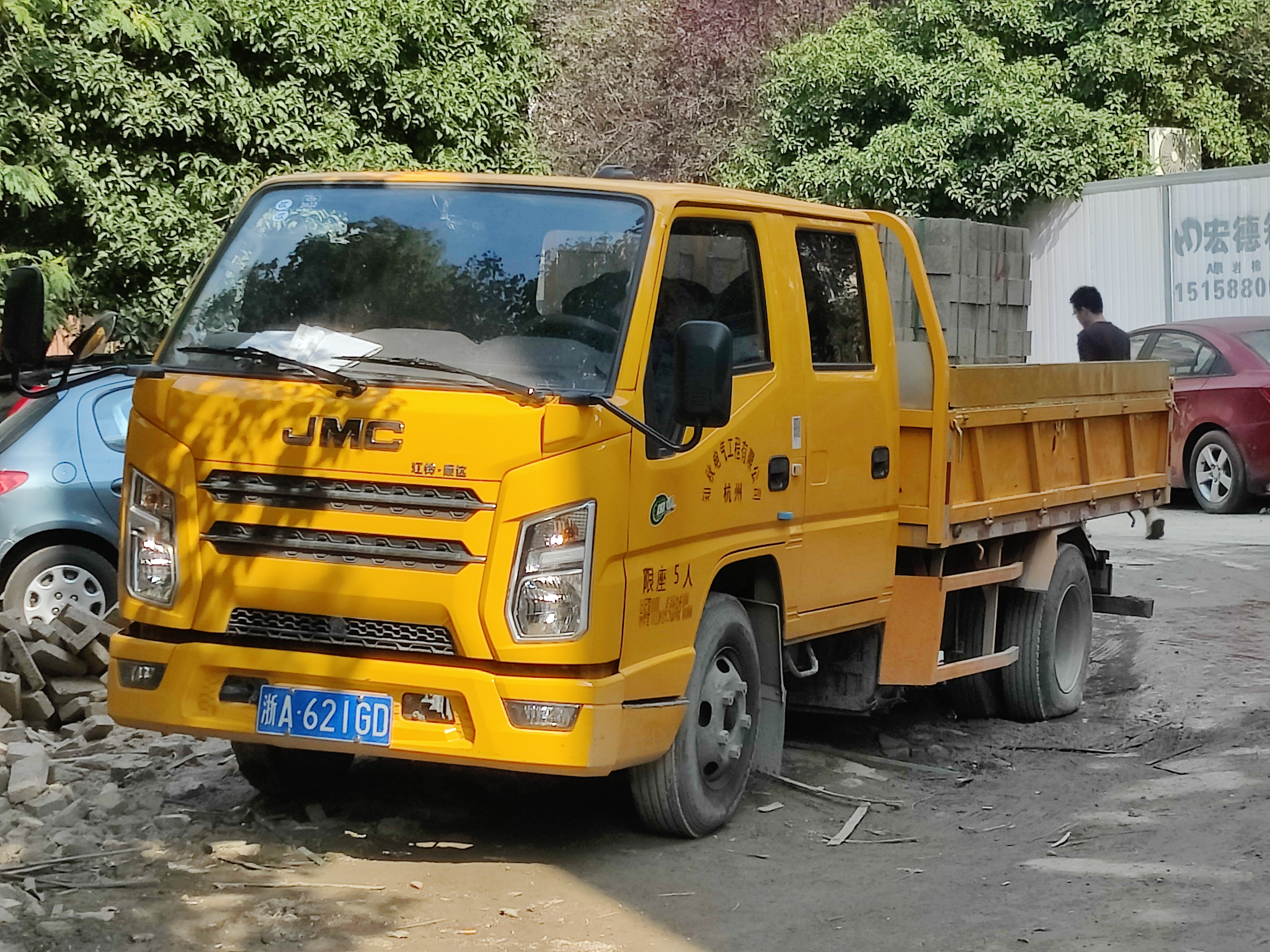

Overview
- Production: 2016–present
- Assembly: China: Nanchang, Jiangxi

Body and chassis
- Body style: Cab-over light truck
- Layout: Front-engine, rear-wheel drive

Powertrain
- Engine: 2.9 L Duratorq diesel / electric (EV variant)
- Transmission: 5-speed or 6-speed manual

Dimensions
- Wheelbase: 3,300–3,650 mm
- Length: 5,500–5,850 mm
- Width: 1,885 mm
- Height: 2,230 mm
- Curb weight: 3,200–4,000 kg (GVW)

The fourth-generation Shunda introduced in 2016 brought a restyled front design, new safety reinforcements and improved interior trim. It remains in production as of 2025 with incremental facelifts and powertrain updates, including electric variants offered for selected domestic logistics fleets. Trade reports confirm the continued sale of internal combustion and BEV Shunda trucks in 2024–2025.

== Fifth generation (2025–present: New Shunda) ==
Fifth/New generation
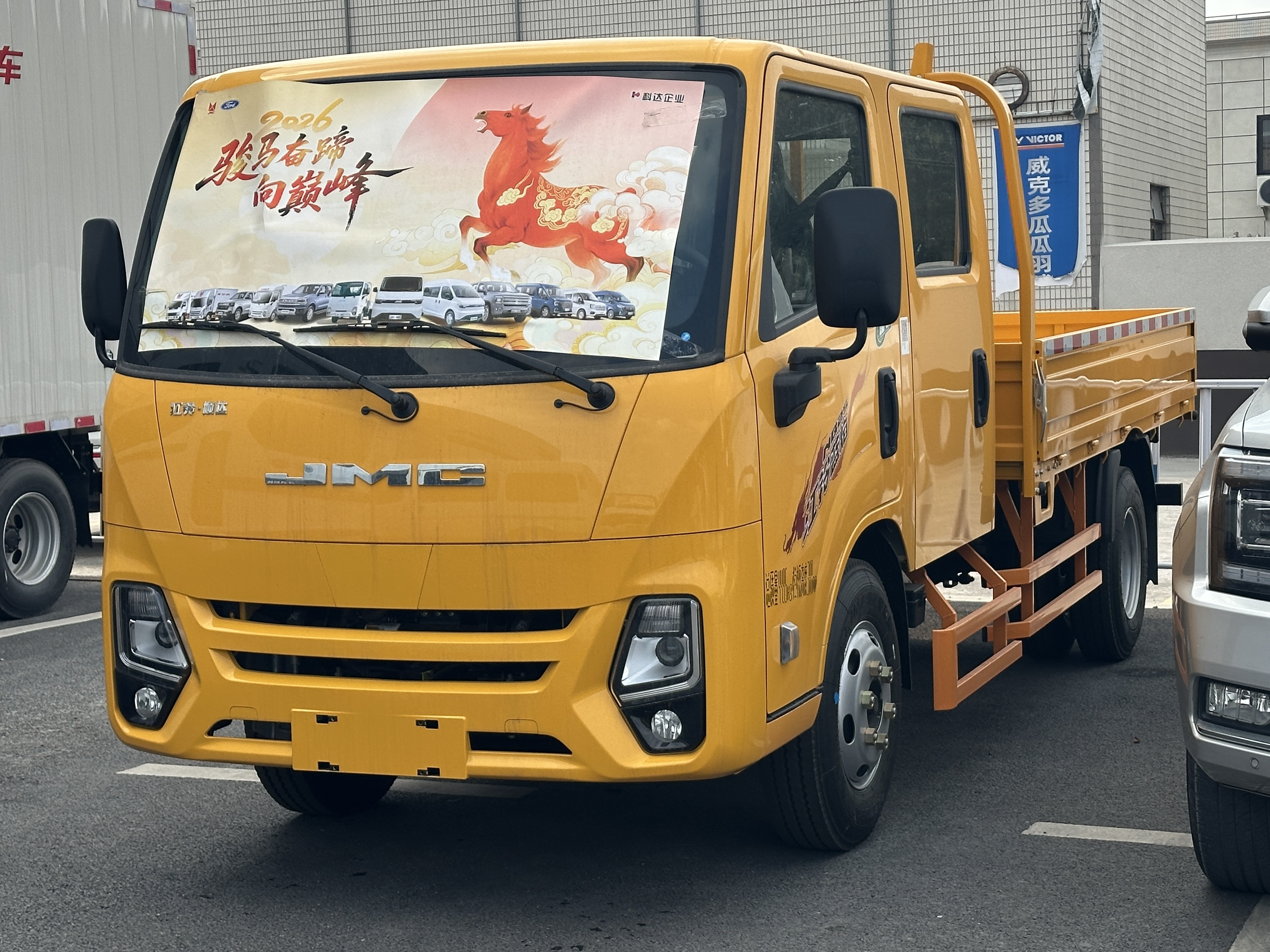

Overview
- Production: 2025–present
- Assembly: China: Nanchang, Jiangxi

Body and chassis
- Body style: Cab-over light truck (ICE and EV)
- Layout: Front-engine, rear-wheel drive

Powertrain
- Engine: 2.8/2.9 L diesel (ICE variants) + electric motor versions
- Transmission: 5/6-speed manual (ICE) / single-speed reduction (EV)

Dimensions
- Length: 5,465 - 5,995 mm
- Width: 1,930 - 1,995 mm
- Height: 2,170 - 2,985 mm
- Curb weight: 2.22 - 2.615 ton

In 2025, JMC launched a new generation Shunda, described in state media as integrating both internal combustion and electric powertrain options. This generation is designed to “embrace dual-energy modes” (双能源模式), offering customers the choice of conventional diesel engines or fully electric variants.

In terms of styling, the new Shunda retains the familiar cab-over layout but with modernized exterior styling, a redesigned front fascia, improved aerodynamics, and upgraded driver comfort features. The vehicle is positioned to serve both traditional customers in commercial transport as well as operators transitioning to electric mobility in urban environments.

The diesel variants continues to be equipped with the 2.8/2.9 L JMC / Duratorq engines, and for the EV models to adopt battery packs suited to city distributions in the 1.5–3 ton class.

This new dual-energy approach marks a significant evolution beyond a pure electric variant, and the fifth-generation Shunda should be treated as a major new model step rather than a simple facelift or trim extension.

JMC Shunda (regular cab)

=== JMC E-Shunda (Shunda EV) ===
The JMC E-Shunda or Shunda EV was launched in November 2024 alongside the E-Fushun van series. Being based on the regular ICE Shunda with a sealed front end design, the E-Shunda has an energy consumption of 18.5 kWh per 100 kilometers.

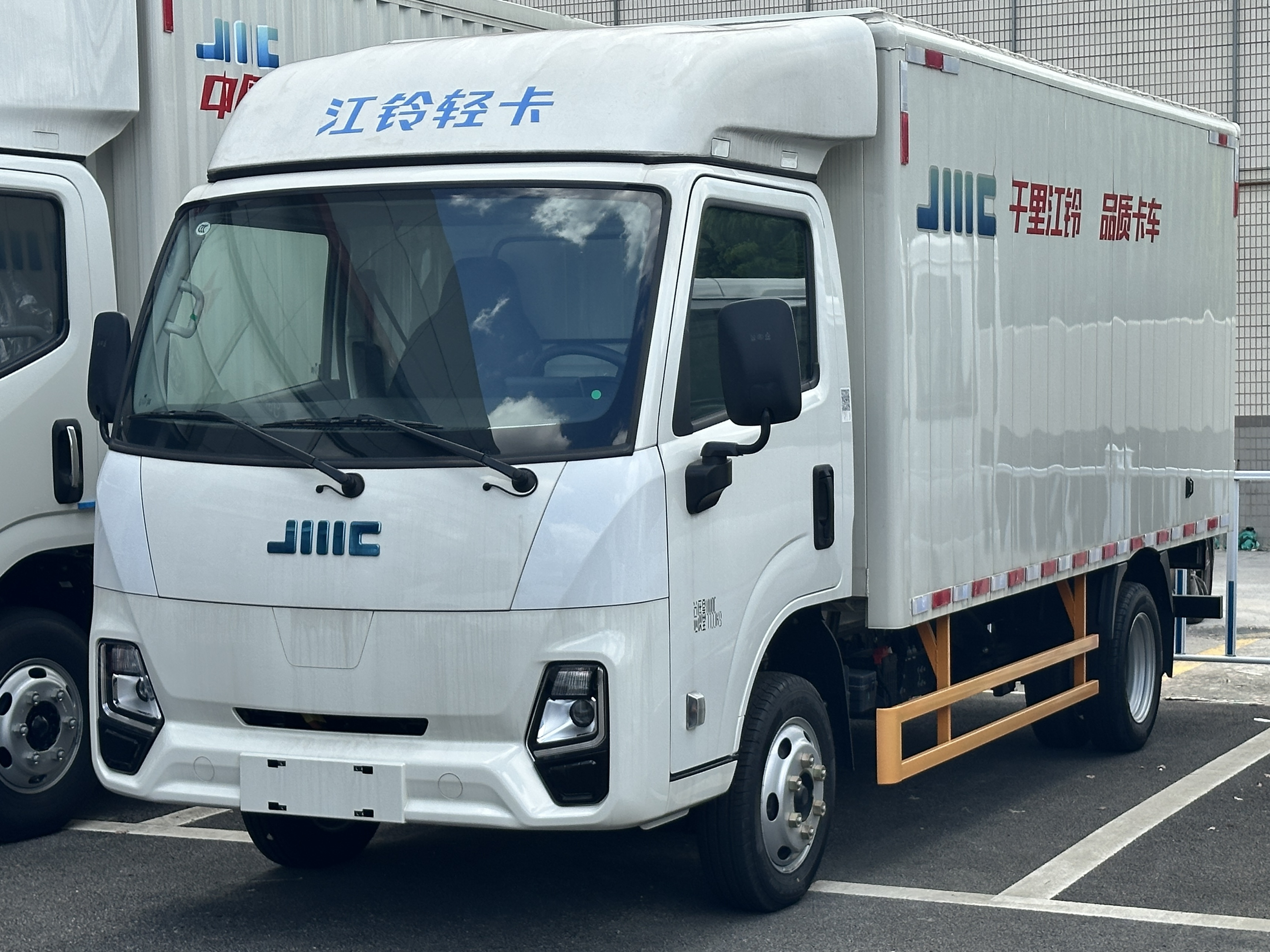
JMC E-Shunda (E顺达)

== Export and JMC Convey designation ==
Several independent export listings identify the JMC Convey as a light truck matching the Shunda’s specifications, suggesting that “Convey” serves as an export-market name for some Shunda-derived models. Distributor documents from Peru’s Pandero group and international listings on trade portals such as Alibaba present vehicles of identical wheelbase and JX493 or Duratorq engines under the Convey name. Because these are distributor-level sources rather than manufacturer statements, “Convey” is best regarded as a regional export designation rather than a formal global name.

== Relationship with other JMC light trucks ==
The Shunda shares core architecture with the JMC Kaiyun and JMC Kairui lines, representing the lightest-duty configuration in JMC’s ladder-frame truck hierarchy. The Kaiyun adds upgraded interiors and optional comfort features for mid-range operators, while the Kairui extends the platform into heavier payload categories. Component commonality across these models simplifies servicing within JMC’s dealership network.
