= JMC Kaiyun =

Series of light trucks by JMC

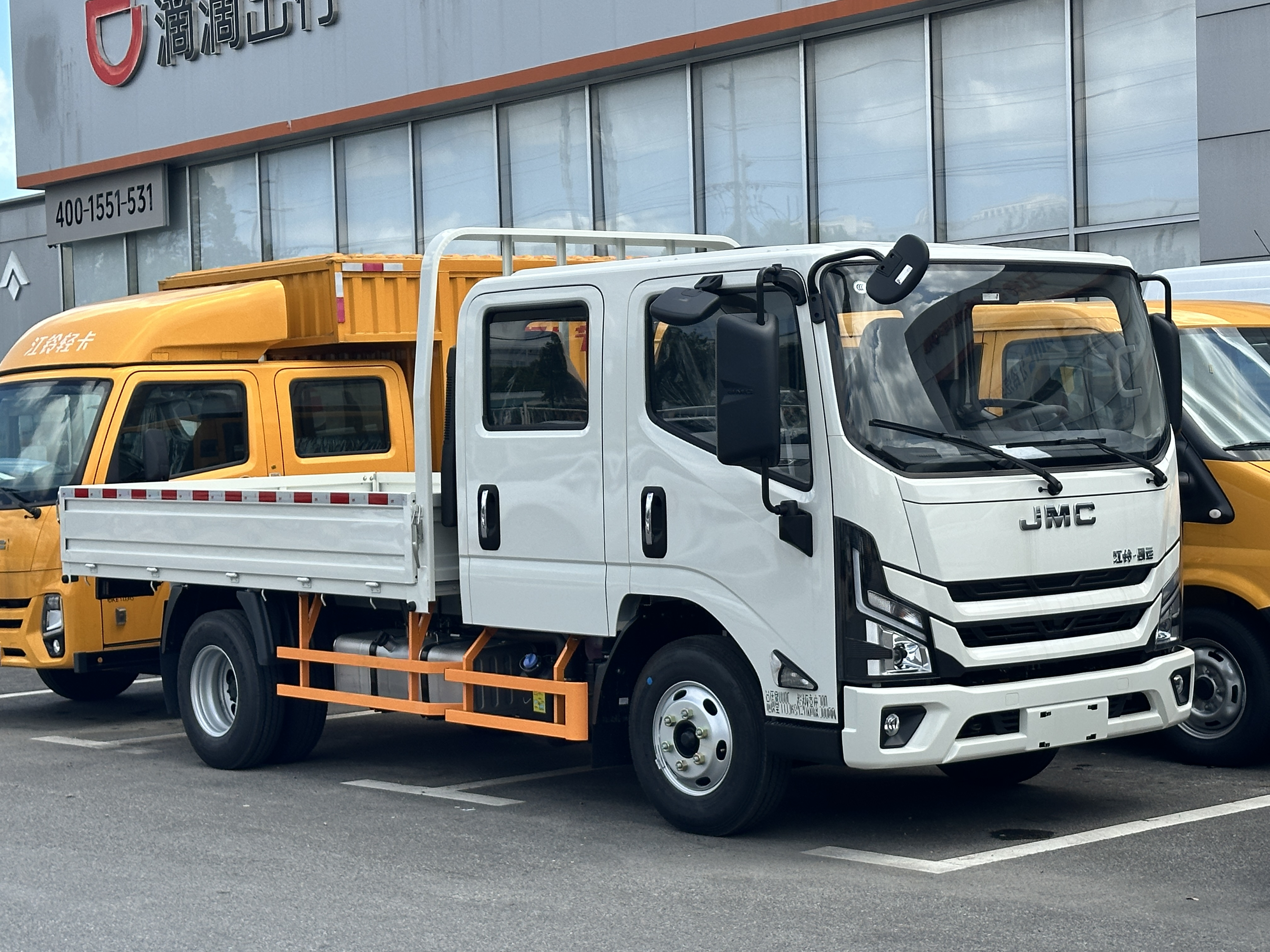

Overview
- Manufacturer: JMC
- Production: 2004–present

Body and chassis
- Class: Light truck
- Body style: Cab-over
- Related: JMC Shunda

Powertrain
- Engine: Inline-4 diesel
- Transmission: 5/6/8-speed manual

The JMC Kaiyun (Chinese: 凯运) is a series of light-duty trucks produced by JMC since 2004. Over four generations, the Kaiyun evolved from an Isuzu-derived platform to an independently developed line of trucks with modernized chassis, diesel engines, and driver-oriented cabins. The model line remains a key product for JMC in domestic and export markets.

Developed initially with technical roots in JMC’s cooperation with Isuzu, the Kaiyun line was intended to serve China’s growing small logistics and light construction sectors. Across successive generations, JMC transitioned from semi-licensed engineering to fully self-developed powertrains and platforms.

== First generation (2004–2013) ==
First generation
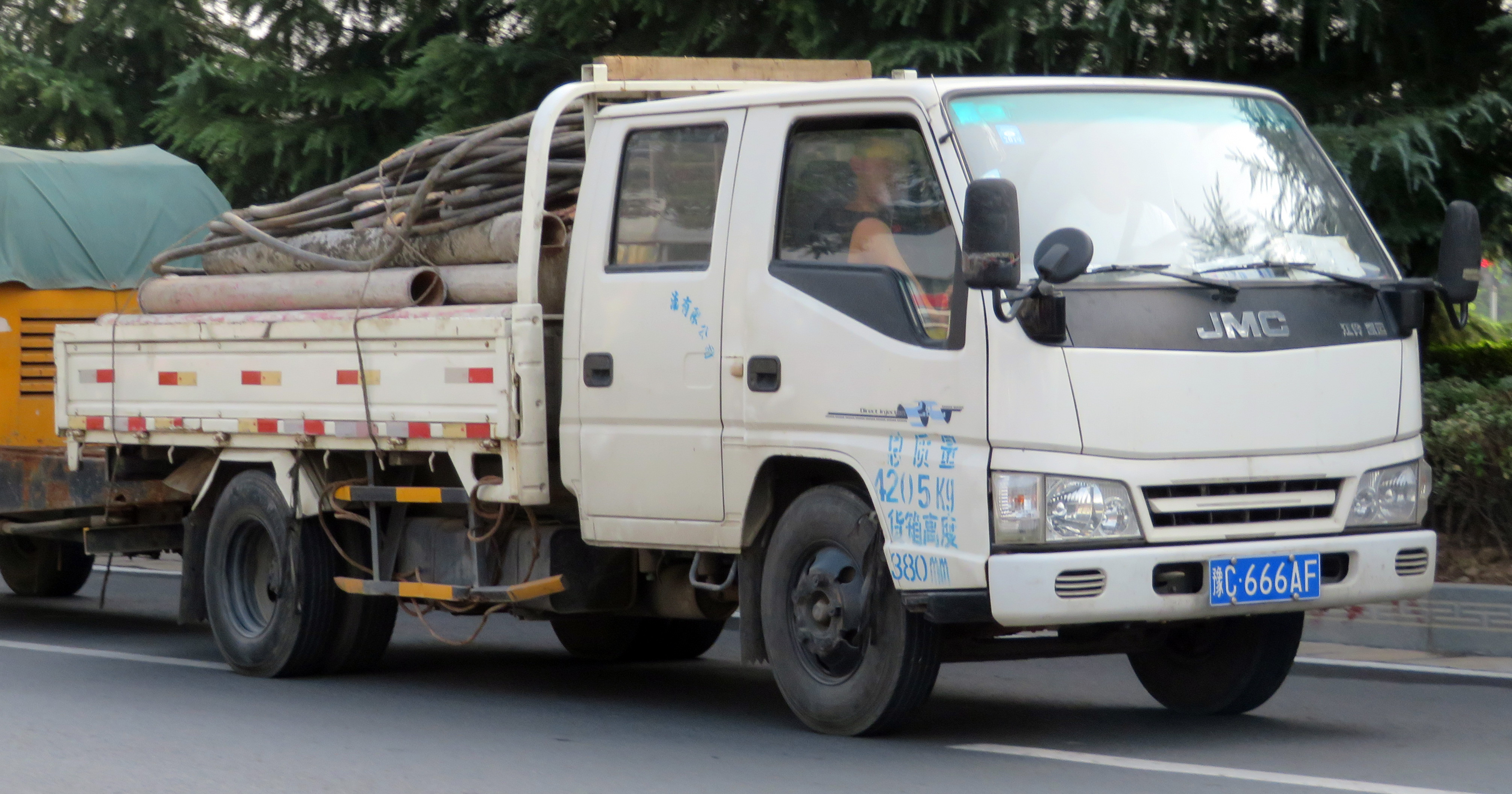

Overview
- Production: 2004–2013
- Assembly: China: Nanchang, Jiangxi

Body and chassis
- Body style: Cab-over (single / double cab)
- Layout: Front-engine, rear-wheel drive
- Related: Isuzu Elf (license influence)

Powertrain
- Engine: JX493 / JX104 diesel I4 (2.8–3.0 L)
- Power output: 92–115 hp
- Transmission: 5-speed manual

Dimensions
- Wheelbase: 2,800–3,360 mm
- Length: 5,350–6,200 mm
- Width: 1,830–1,950 mm
- Height: 2,120–2,310 mm

The first-generation Kaiyun was unveiled in 2004 as JMC’s first primarily self-engineered light truck. Retaining the Isuzu-style cab-over form, it used durable ladder-frame construction and JX-series diesel engines with JX493 and JX104 diesel engines developing 92 to 115 hp. The gearbox is a 5-speed manual transmission and the payload is 3 tons. Emission standards of the first generation Kaiyun is China II–III emission compliance.

== Second generation (2013–2019) ==
Second generation
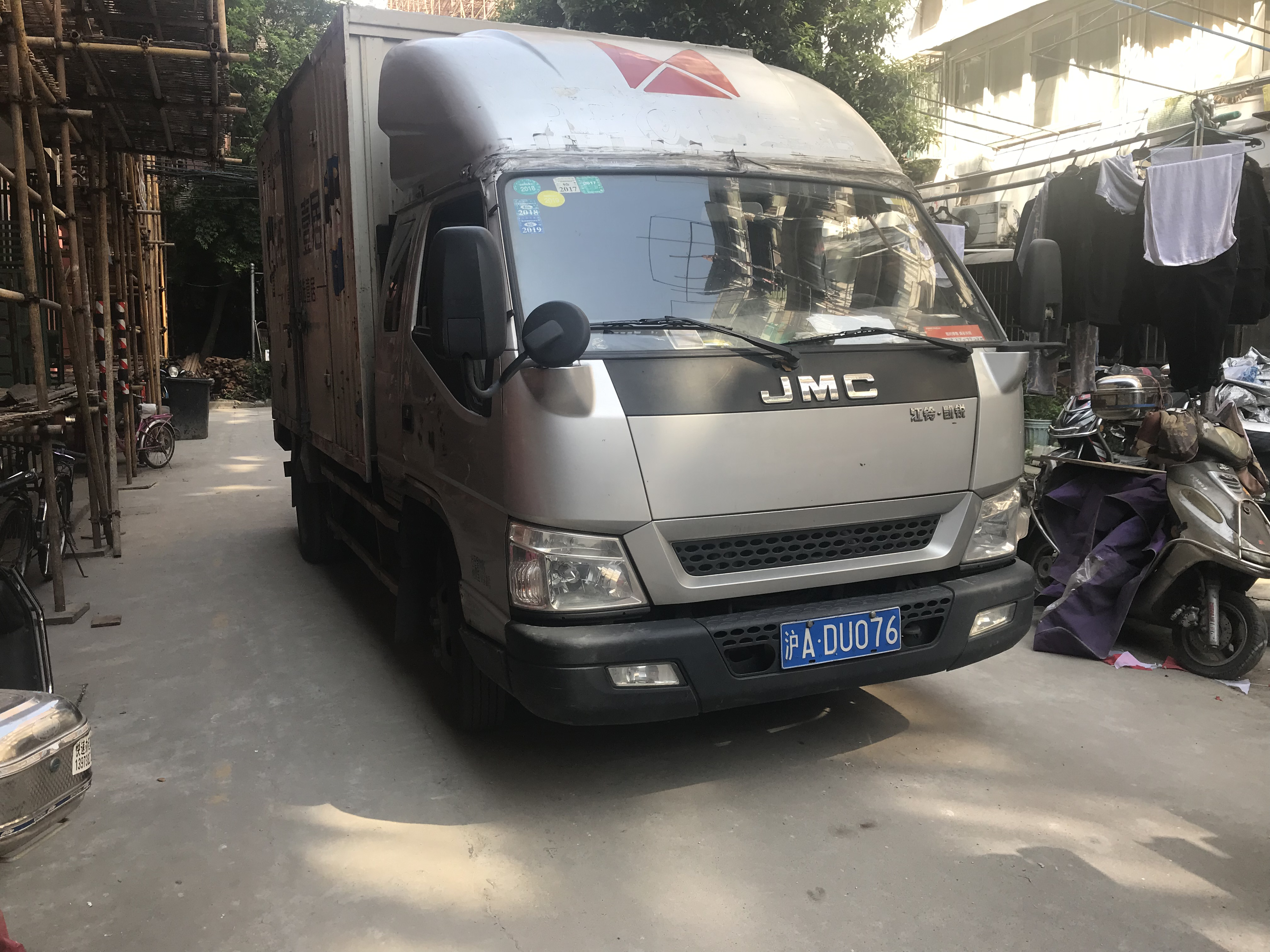

Overview
- Also called: JMC Carrying (export market); JMC Kairui (凯锐, better equipped variant for the second generation model); JMC Conquer (export name for Kairui)
- Production: 2013–2019
- Assembly: China: Nanchang, Jiangxi

Body and chassis
- Body style: Cab-over
- Layout: Front-engine, rear-wheel drive

Powertrain
- Engine: 4JB1, JX493 diesel I4
- Power output: 120 hp
- Transmission: 5/6-speed manual

Dimensions
- Wheelbase: 2,800–3,360 mm
- Length: 5,450–6,200 mm
- Width: 1,860–1,960 mm
- Height: 2,150–2,300 mm

The second generation, launched in 2013, featured a redesigned cab with better visibility, improved ergonomics, and new diesel calibrations. The engine is a 4JB1, JX493 diesel inline-4 engine. Power steering and optional ABS is now available and the payload is 3.5 tons maximum. The “Kaiyun Upgraded” (凯运升级版) name was used for facelift versions introduced around 2016.

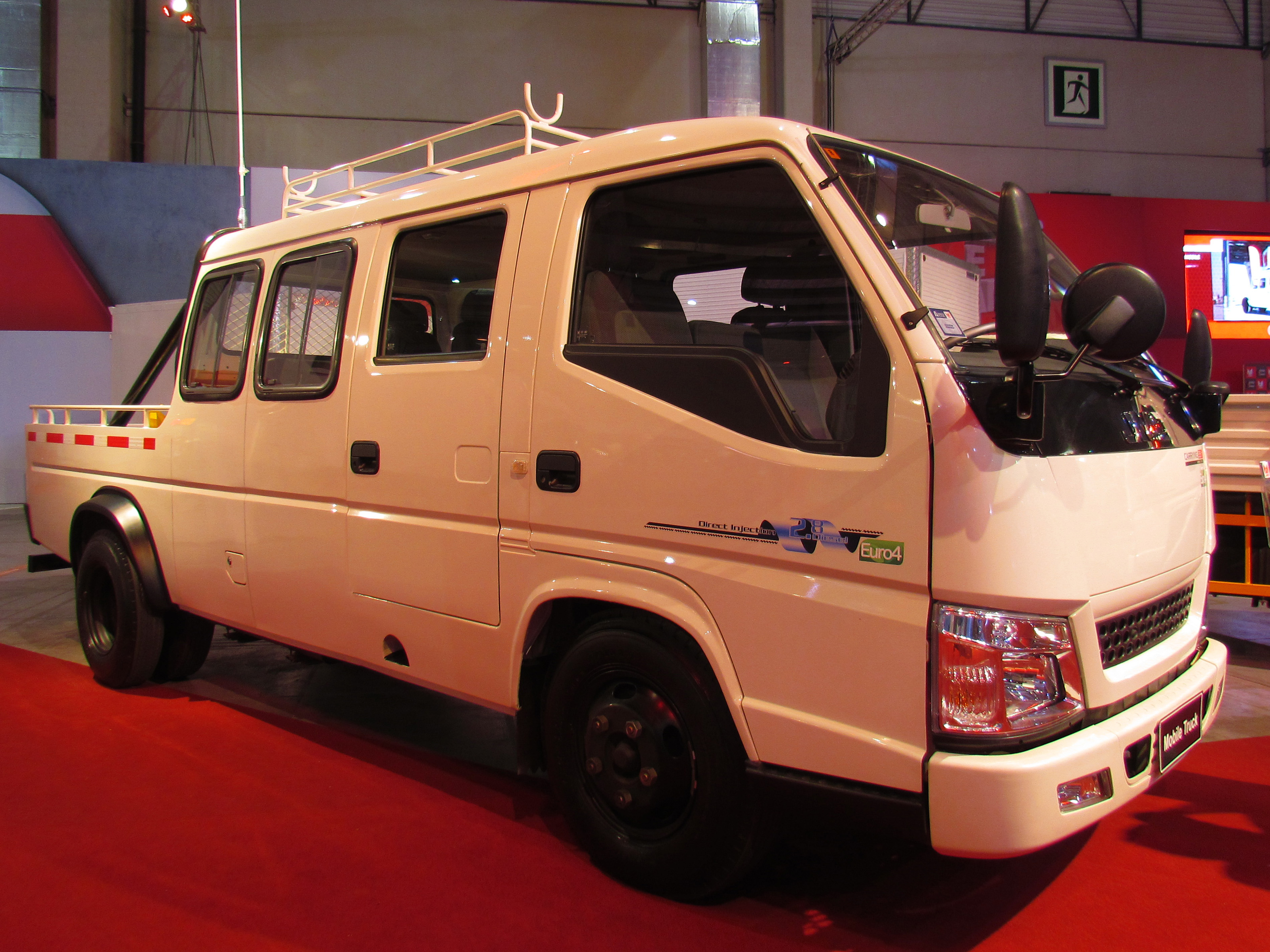
JMC Carrying 3.5T Mobile Truck

== Third generation (2019–2022) ==
Third generation
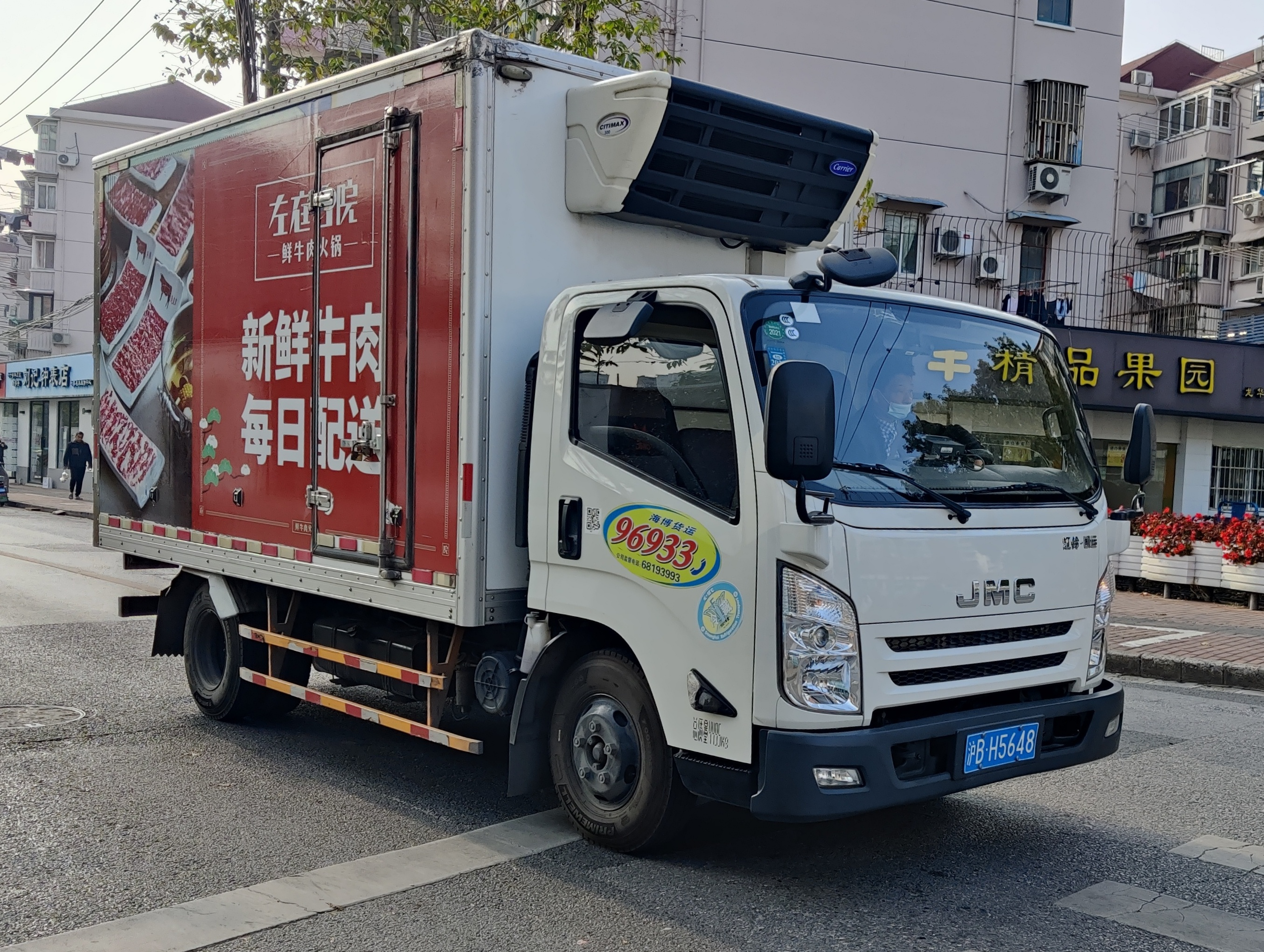

Overview
- Also called: JMC Carrying (export market); JMC Kairui (凯锐, better equipped variant for the third generation model); JMC Conquer (export name for Kairui)
- Production: 2019–2022
- Assembly: China: Nanchang, Jiangxi

Body and chassis
- Body style: Cab-over
- Layout: Front-engine, rear-wheel drive

Powertrain
- Engine: 4D25 diesel I4 (2.5 L)
- Power output: 130 hp/320 Nm
- Transmission: 5/6-speed manual

Dimensions
- Wheelbase: 2,800–3,360 mm
- Length: 5,450–6,200 mm
- Width: 1,880–1,970 mm
- Height: 2,150–2,340 mm

The third-generation Kaiyun arrived in 2019 with major styling and structural changes. It introduced China VI engines, a wider grille, improved aerodynamics, and upgraded cabin NVH insulation. The power comes from a 2.5 liter 4D25 diesel engine developing 130 hp, while the body features a wider cab and aerodynamic front fascia.

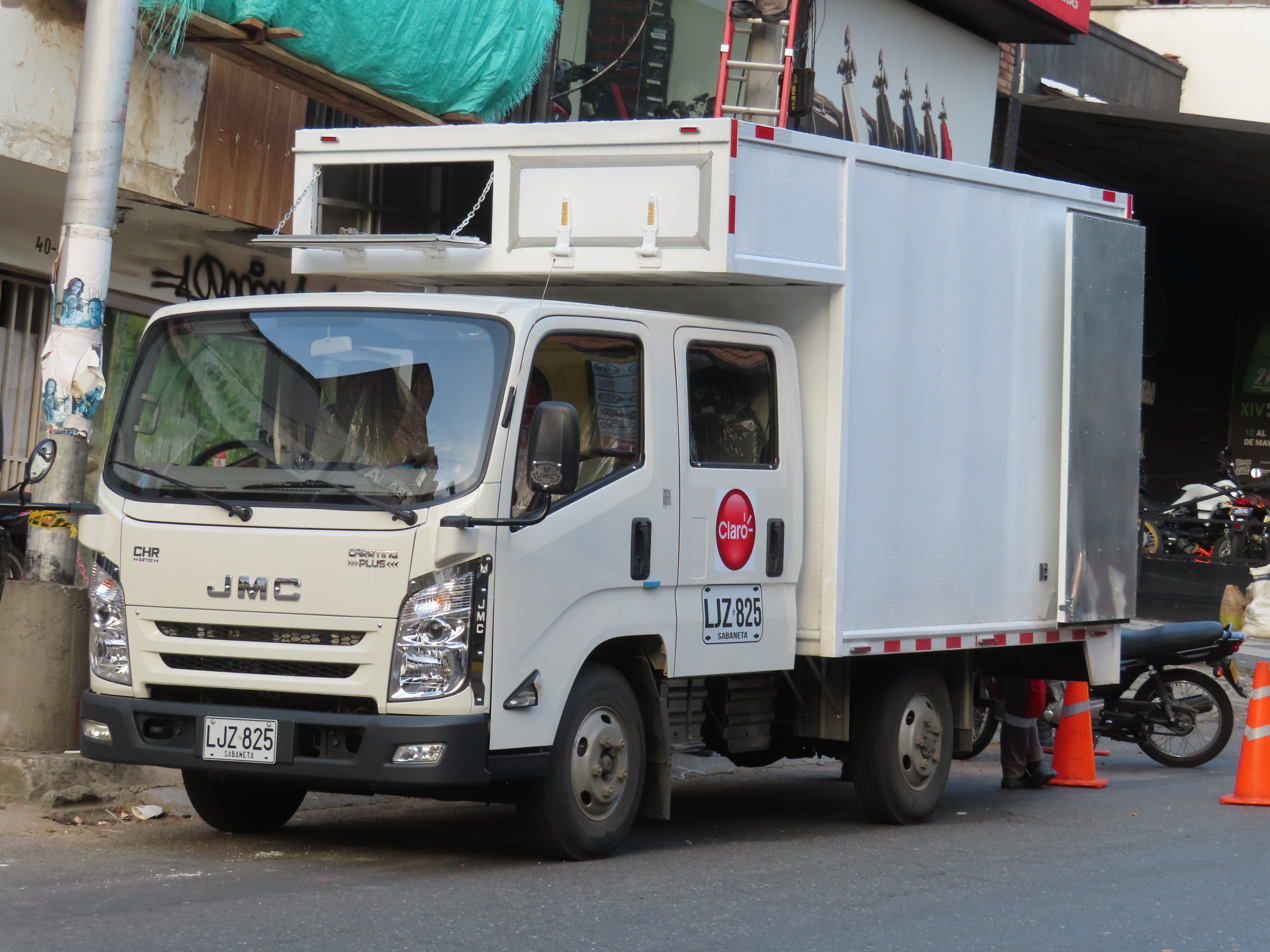
JMC Carrying Plus crew cab

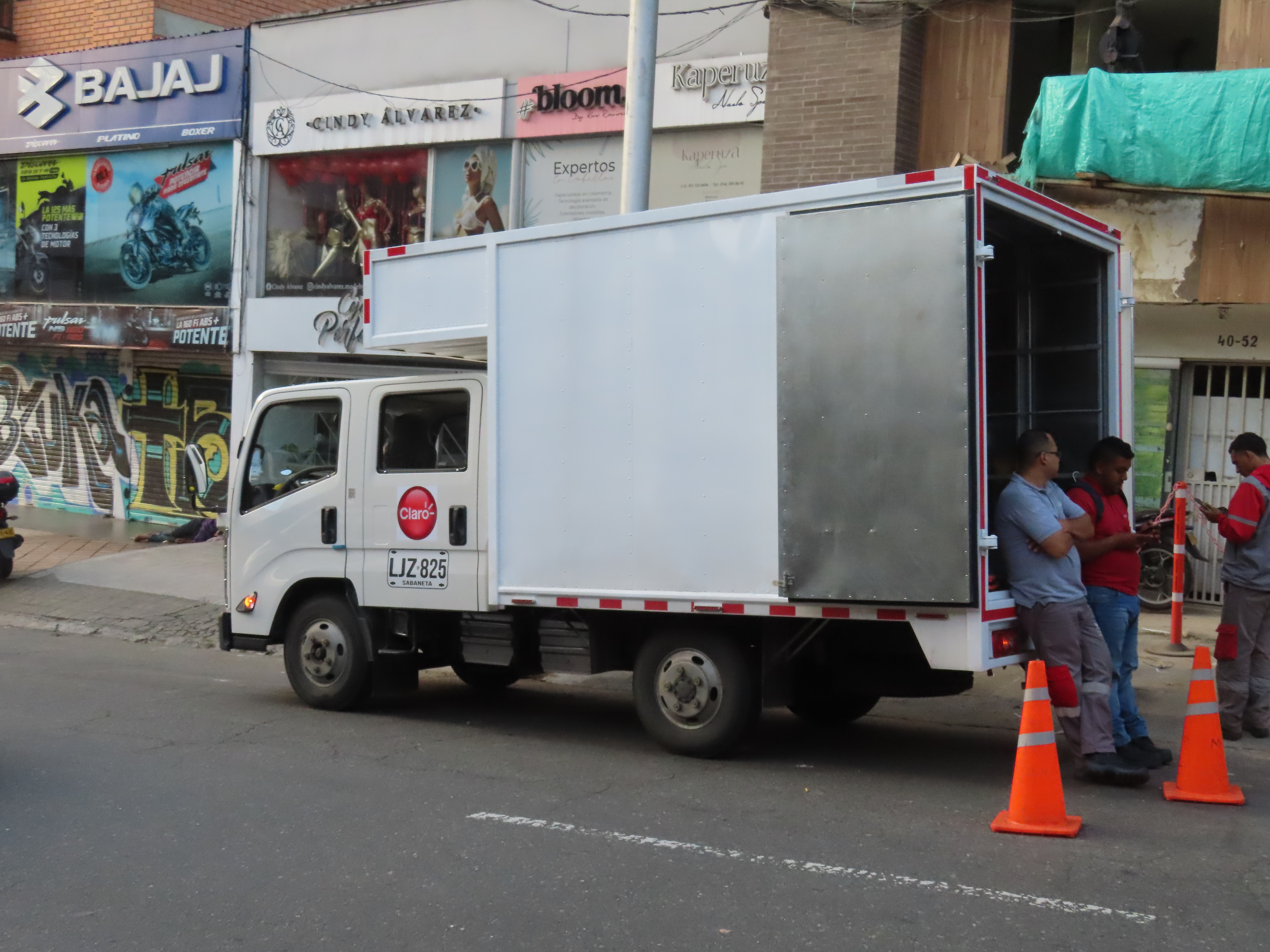
Rear view

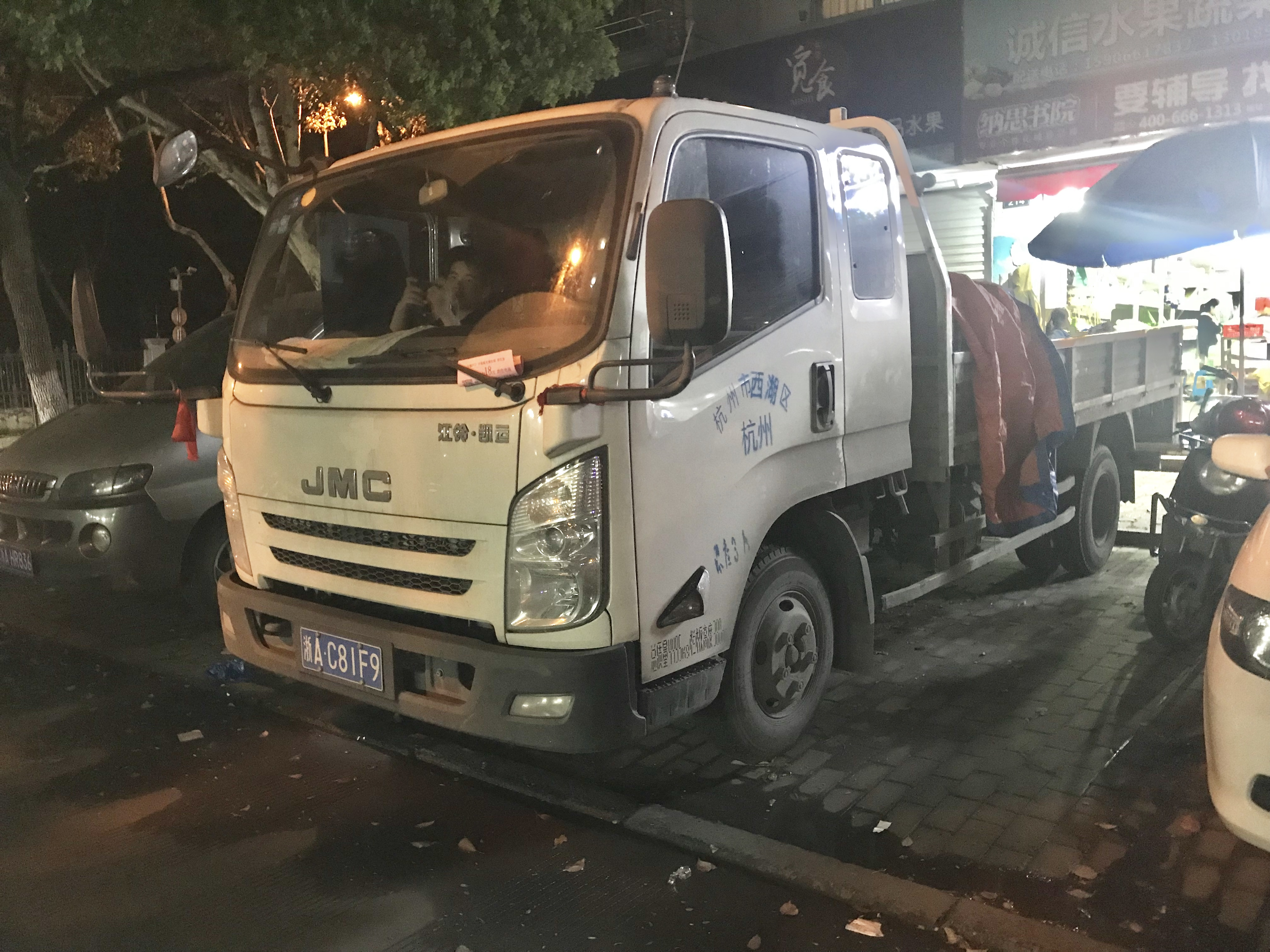
JMC Kaiyun extended cab

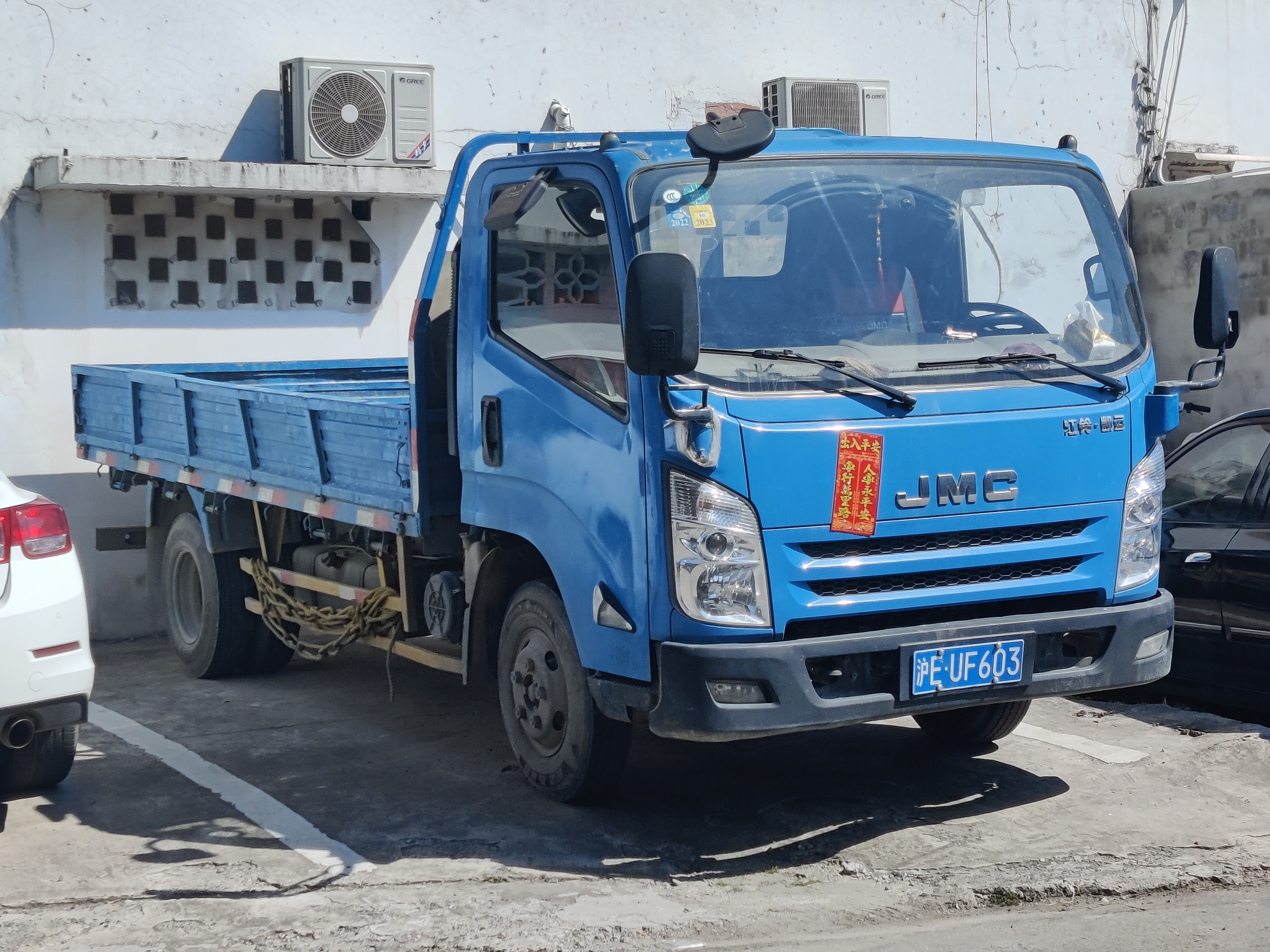
JMC Kaiyun standard pickup

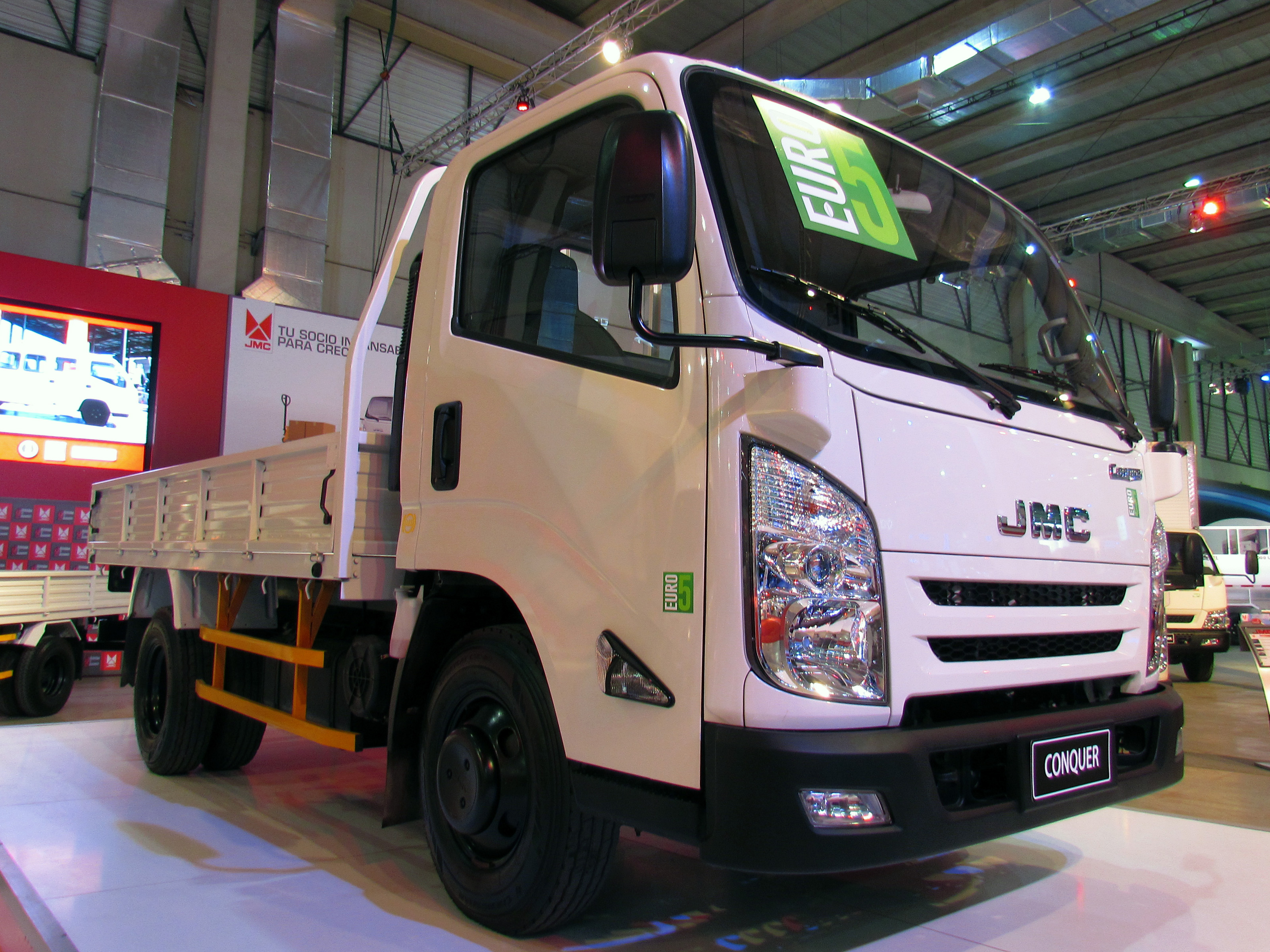
JMC Conquer

== Fourth generation (2022–present: Kaiyun+) ==
Fourth generation
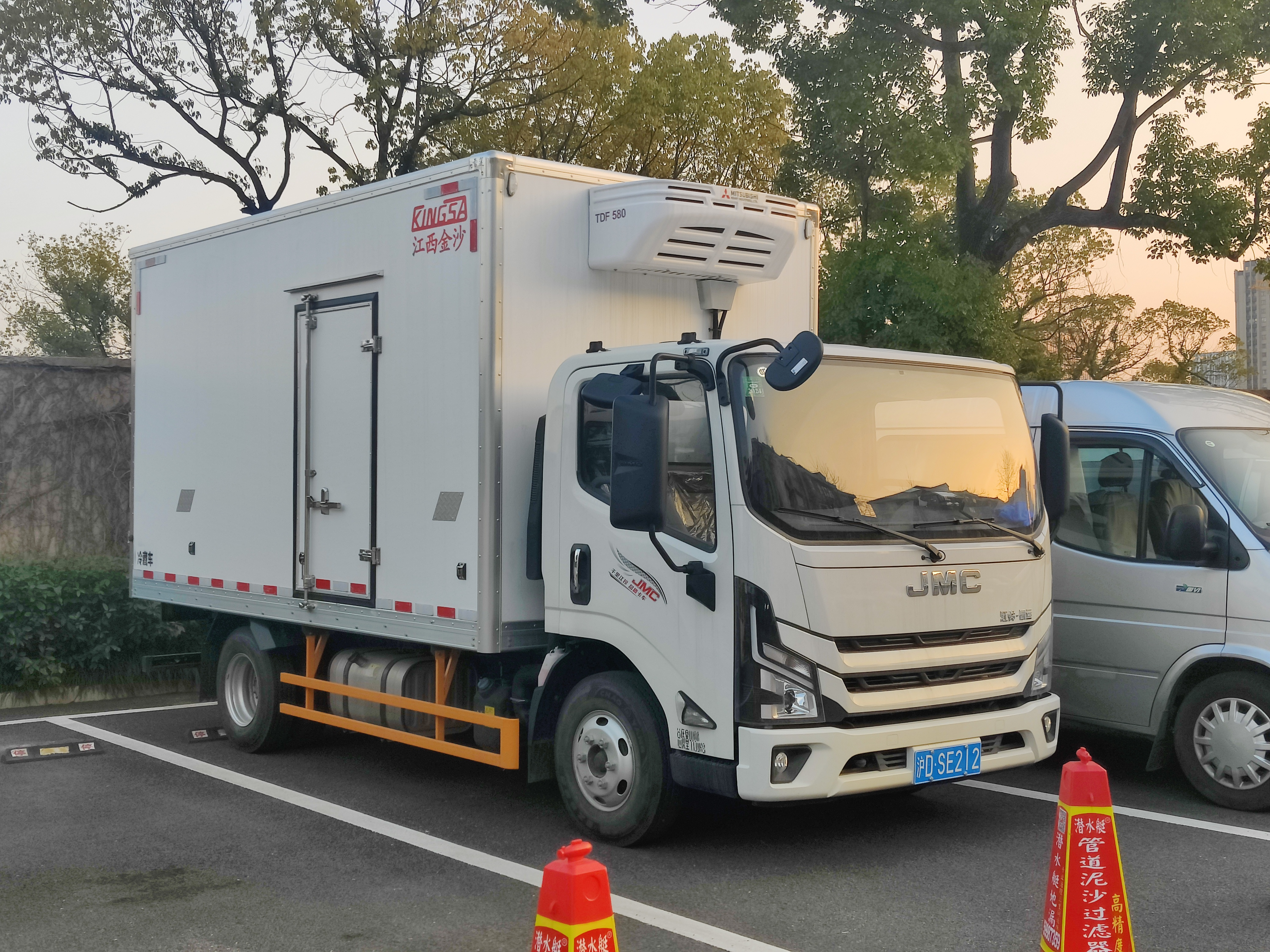

Overview
- Also called: JMC Lexing E-Luda (乐行E路达, Lexing E-Road) (electric variant); Tirsam 3.5 Tonnes (Algeria)
- Production: 2022–present
- Assembly: China: Nanchang, Jiangxi

Body and chassis
- Body style: Single / double cab, flatbed or box
- Layout: Front-engine, rear-wheel drive

Powertrain
- Engine: 4D25, 4D30, JX493 diesel I4 (100–150 hp)
- Transmission: 5/6/8-speed manual

Dimensions
- Wheelbase: 2,800–3,360 mm
- Length: 5,550–6,400 mm
- Width: 1,950–2,030 mm
- Height: 2,220–2,400 mm

The fourth generation, branded as the Kaiyun+, debuted in late 2022 as a fully redesigned platform. It features an all-new aerodynamic cab, lightweight frame, and upgraded interior comfort, and was sold alongside the previous generation, now dubbed as the Classic Kaiyun. The diesel engines produces 100 to 150 hp and is mated to a choice of 5-, 6-, or 8-speed manual transmission. The payload is 3.5 to 6 tons depending on the model. Interior reviews highlight improved ergonomics, seat comfort, and NVH refinement.

=== JMC Lexing E-Road/ E-Road Max ===
The JMC Lexing E-Road or JMC Lexing E-Luda (乐行 E路达) is the electric variant of the fourth generation JMC Kaiyun. The JMC Lexing E-Road utilize J-Blue, Jiangling's new energy system, which features high-torque flat-wire motors, SiC (silicon carbide) multi-in-one controllers, and EHB (electronic hydraulic brake) energy recovery technology. It was unveiled on June 19, 2023.

The Lexing E-Road Max is a variant launched in January 2026. The Max features a restyled front end and a longer range with an option of 100/120/140/165kWh batteries that covers a range from 309 to 500km. Under 2C fast charging, 30% to 80% SoC takes 15 minutes.

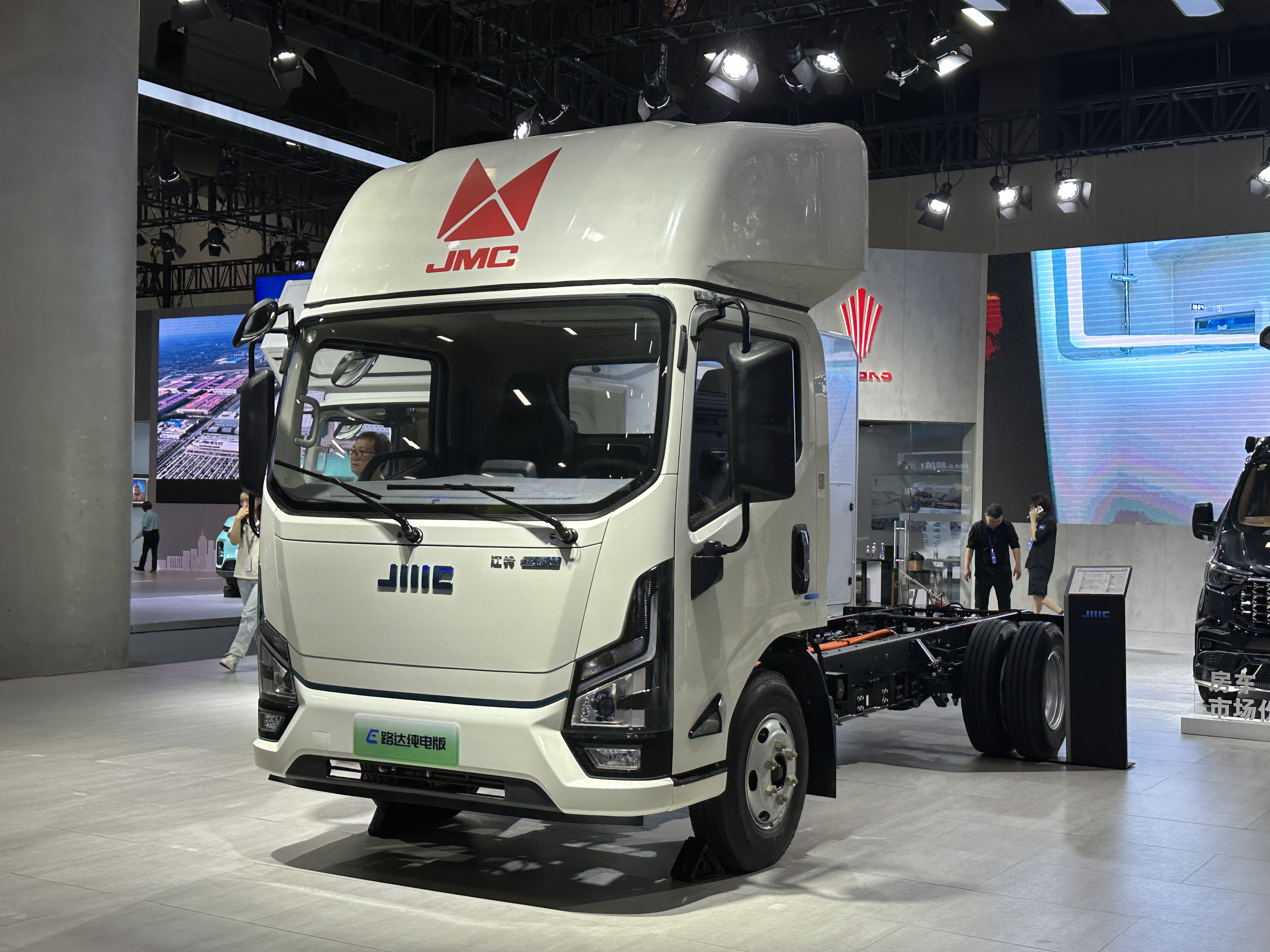
JMC Lexing E-Luda (乐行 E路达) / Lexing E-Road, electric variant chassis cab

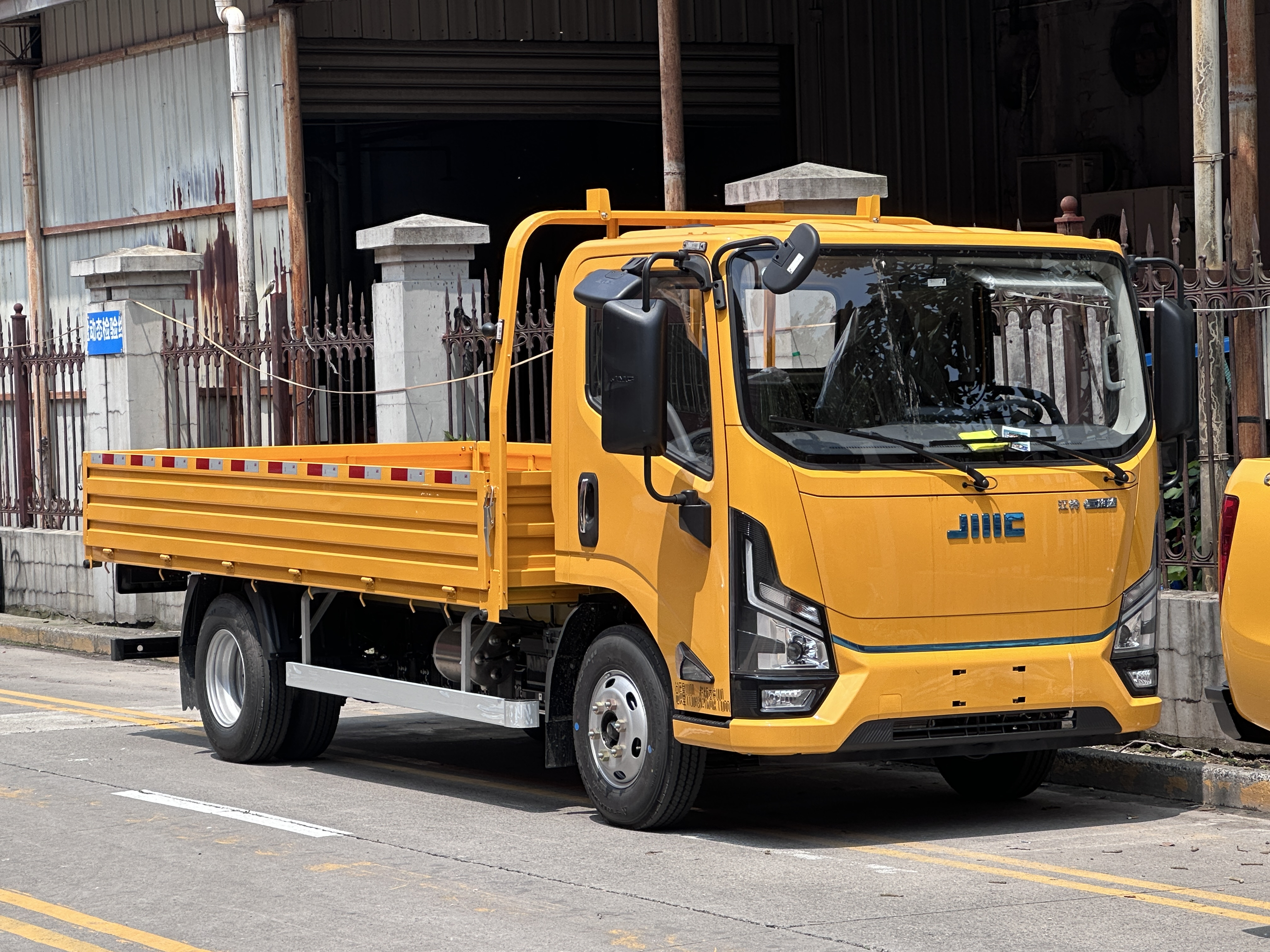
JMC Lexing E-Road pickup

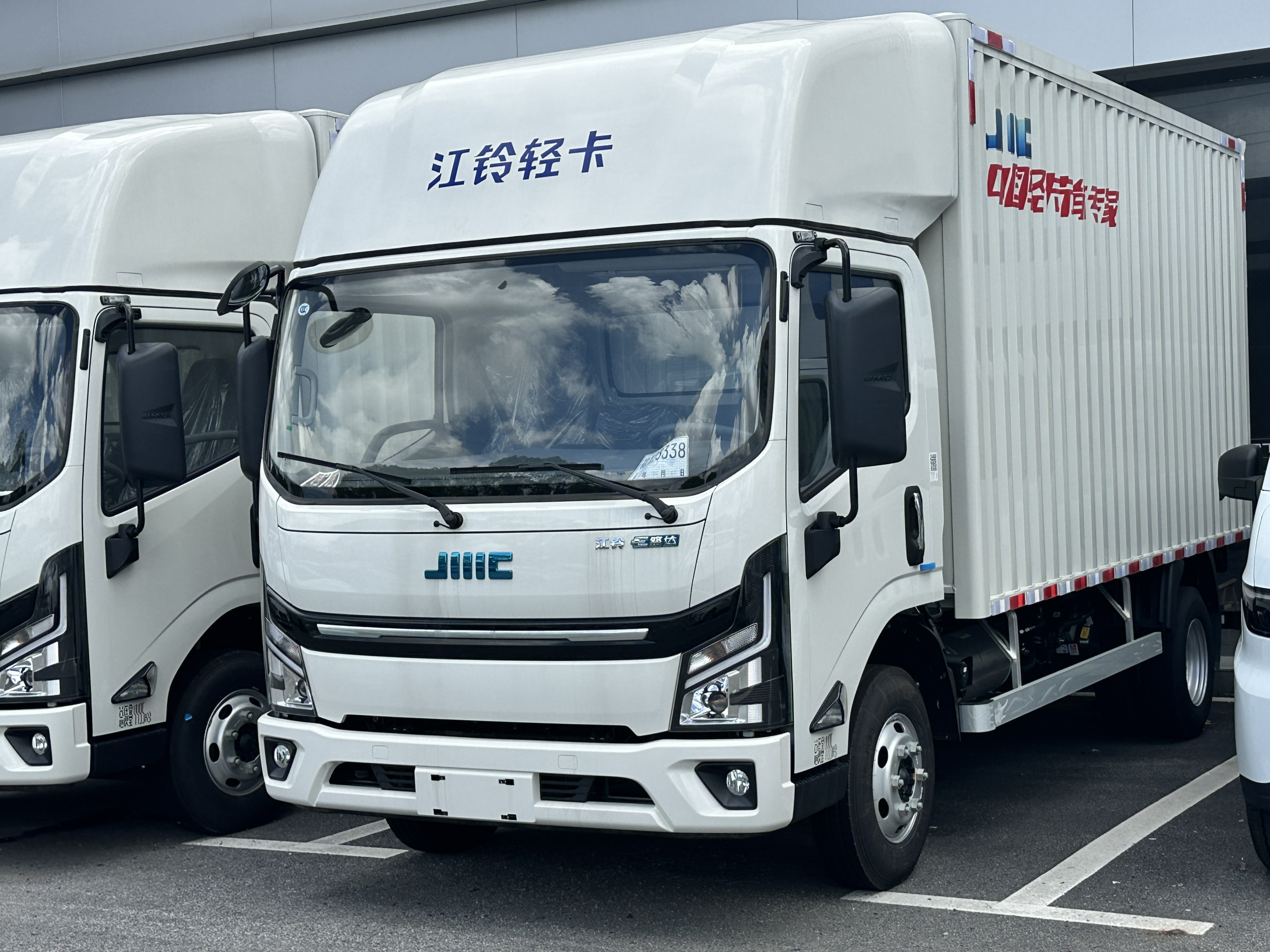
JMC Lexing E-Road Max

== Markets ==
The Kaiyun continues to be JMC’s primary light truck series, competing with the Dongfeng Captain, JAC N-Series, and Foton Ollin. Export versions called the JMC Carrying are sold in parts of Southeast Asia, Africa, and South America.
