= G3 =

G3, G03, G.III, G.3 or G-3 may refer to:

== Politics ==
- G3 Free Trade Agreement between Colombia, Mexico and Venezuela
- EU three of France, Germany, and Italy

== Military ==
- AEG G.III, a German World War I heavy bomber
- Albatros G.III, a 1916 German bomber aircraft
- Caudron G.3, a 1913 French single-engined biplane
- Friedrichshafen G.III, a 1915 German medium bomber
- G-3 U. S. Army Operations (military staff)
- G3 battlecruiser, a post First World War design for the Royal Navy that was curtailed by the Washington Naval Treaty
- G3 (NATO), the Assistant Chief Of Staff or senior staff officer on Operations and Plans at the division level and higher
- Gotha G.III, a 1916 German heavy bomber
- Heckler & Koch G3, a battle rifle produced by Heckler & Koch
- Soko G-3, improved variant of Soko G-2 airplane
- USS G-3 (SS-31), an early U.S. Navy submarine
- Group of Three, a group dispatched to Lebanon in 1958, shortly before the 1958 Lebanon crisis

== Electronics ==
- Canon PowerShot G3, a digital camera made by Canon
- G3 power state, in computer ACPI power states
- G3, a fax encoding format
- G3, a PBX from the Avaya Definity range
- Gibson G3, a 1975 bass guitar
- iAudio G3, an mp3 player from the Cowon iAudio range
- Panasonic Lumix DMC-G3, a digital interchangeable lens camera made by Panasonic
- PowerPC G3, a microprocessor branding used by Apple Computer
- LG G3, an Android smartphone developed by LG Electronics
- G3 gaming laptops series from Dell
- iMac G3, the first product in Apple's iMac line

== Media ==
- g3 (British magazine), a UK magazine aimed at lesbian and bisexual women
- G3 (tour), a live music show and guitar tour organized by Joe Satriani and Steve Vai
- G3: Genes, Genomes, Genetics, a scientific journal in the discipline of genetics, published by the Genetics Society of America
- GIII, the alternative title for the third and final film in the Gamera heisei trilogy.

== Science and medicine ==
- ATC code G03 Sex hormones and modulators of the genital system, subgroup of the Anatomical Therapeutic Chemical Classification System
- G3 star, a subclass of G-class stars in stellar classification
- Group 3 element of the periodic table
- G3 medium in embryo culture
- G-3 (drug) (Ganesha-3), a psychedelic drug

== Transportation ==
- Galactic 03 (G03), a suborbital tourist spaceflight on 8 September 2023

=== Air transportation ===
- City Connexion Airlines, a former Burundian airline, IATA designation G3
- Gol Transportes Aéreos, a Brazilian economy airline, IATA designation G3
- Gulfstream III, an American business jet, sometimes abbreviated GIII

=== Automobiles ===
- BYD G3, a 2009–2014 Chinese compact sedan
- Enranger G3, a 2014–2020Chinese subcompact SUV
- Polytron G3, a 2025-present Indonesian battery electric compact crossover SUV, rebadged Skyworth EV6
- Pontiac G3, a 2008–2010 American subcompact car
- XPeng G3, a 2018–2023 Chinese compact electric SUV

=== Rail transportation ===
- Gaiemmae Station, station G-03 of the Tokyo Metro Ginza Line
- PRR G3, an American PRR 4-6-0 locomotive
- WLWR Class G3, a Waterford, Limerick and Western Railway Irish steam locomotive
- LNER Class G3, a class of British steam locomotives

=== Roads and routes ===
- G3 Beijing–Taipei Expressway, incomplete expressway intended to link mainland China and Taiwan

=== Watercraft ===
- G3 boats, from Yamaha Motor Corporation

== Other ==
- Kamen Rider G3, a fictional character featured in Kamen Rider Agito
- G3 (company), or "Good Governance Group", British corporate security and intelligence company
- G3 Ministries, a Reformed Baptist ministry in the United States that hosts the G3 Conference
- G-3 visa, a type of non-immigrant visa allowing travel to the United States
- G-III Apparel Group, a clothing manufacturing company
- G3 Canada, a Canadian grain company and successor to the Canadian Wheat Board

== See also ==
- 3G (disambiguation)
- GGG (disambiguation)
