= Sinotruk =

Sinotruk may refer to:

- China National Heavy Duty Truck Group: or Sinotruk Group, a state-owned truck manufacturing enterprise in China
- Sinotruk (Hong Kong): a subsidiary and listed company of China National Heavy Duty Truck Group in Hong Kong
