= Enranger =

- Industry: Automotive
- Founded: December 27, 2013
- Owner: Weichai (Chongqing) Automotive

The "Enranger" (英致) is the first brand created by Weichai in the light vehicle business field. So far, Weichai's products in the light vehicle field will be under the "Yingzhi" brand, which also marks the official launch of Weichai Motors' Weichai Automobile Co., Ltd. The path of exploration and innovation in the light vehicle market.

Production started in the second half of 2014 in an individual facility in Chongqing. Initial capacity was 100,000 cars per year which was planned to later be expanded to 300,000 annually.

== Models ==
- Enranger 727 - compact MPV (lower trim level of the 737)
- Enranger 737 - compact MPV (codenamed M301)
- Enranger 737 EV - electric compact MPV
- Enranger EX1 - mini crossover
- Enranger G3 - subcompact crossover (code named S201)
- Enranger G5 - compact crossover based on the 737
- Enranger P80 - pickup truck
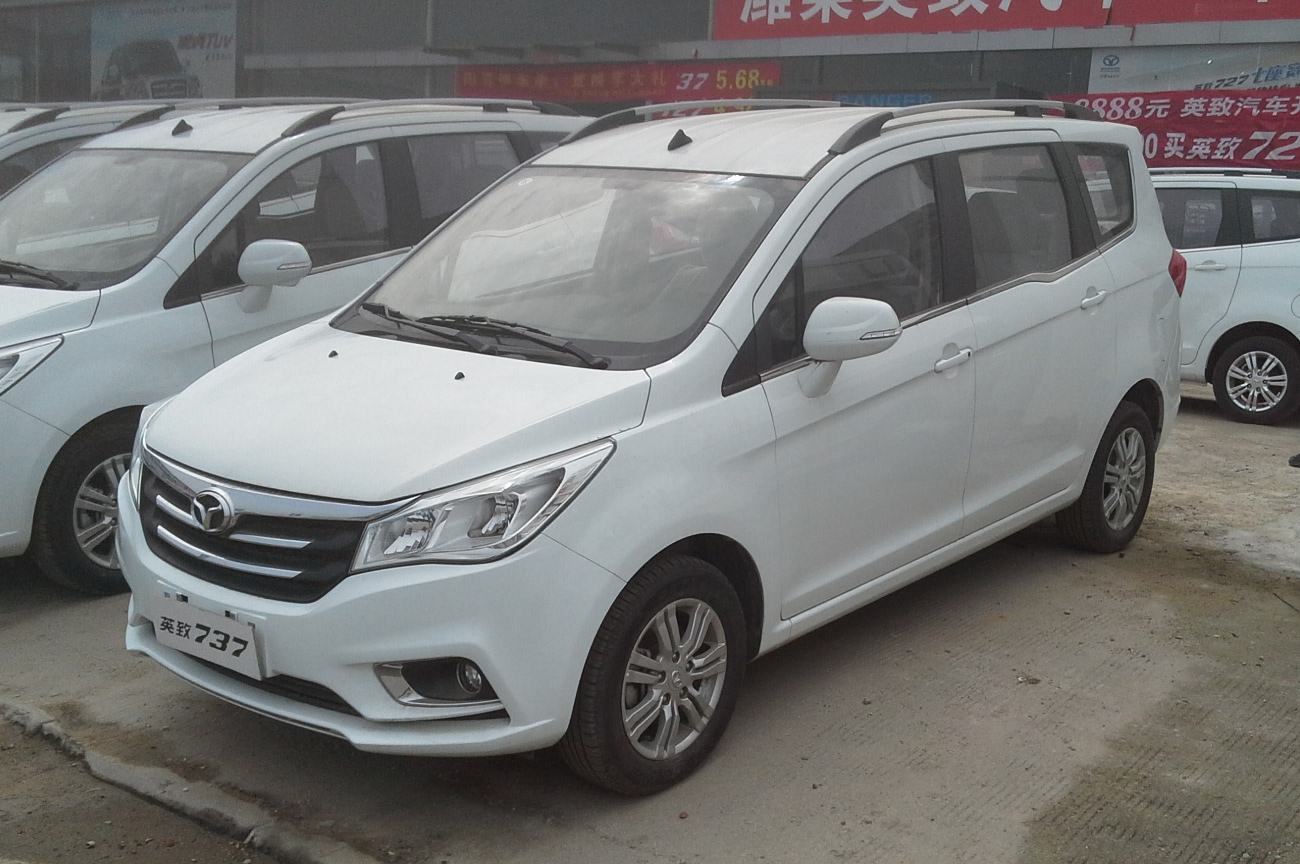
Enranger 737

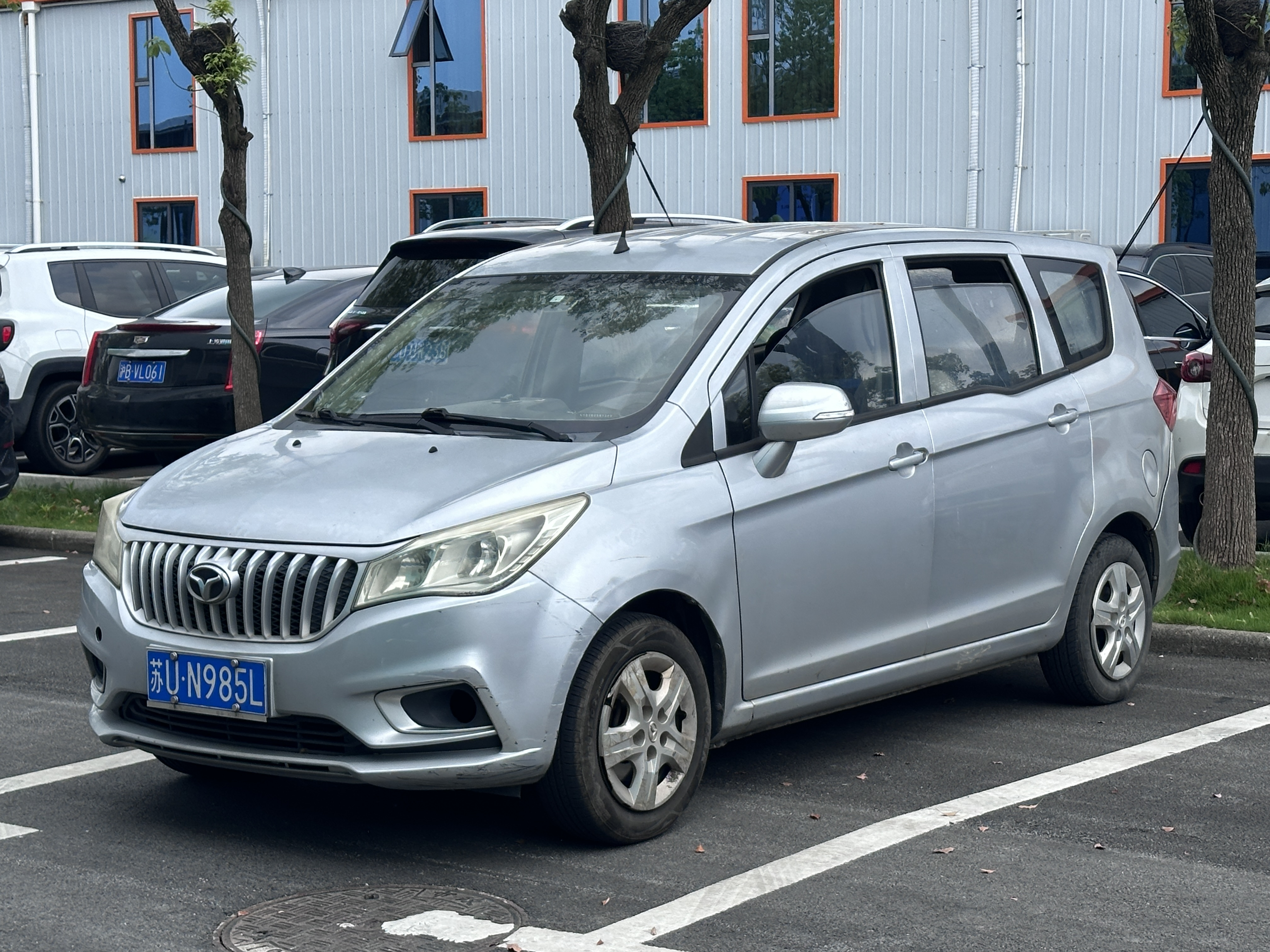
Enranger 727

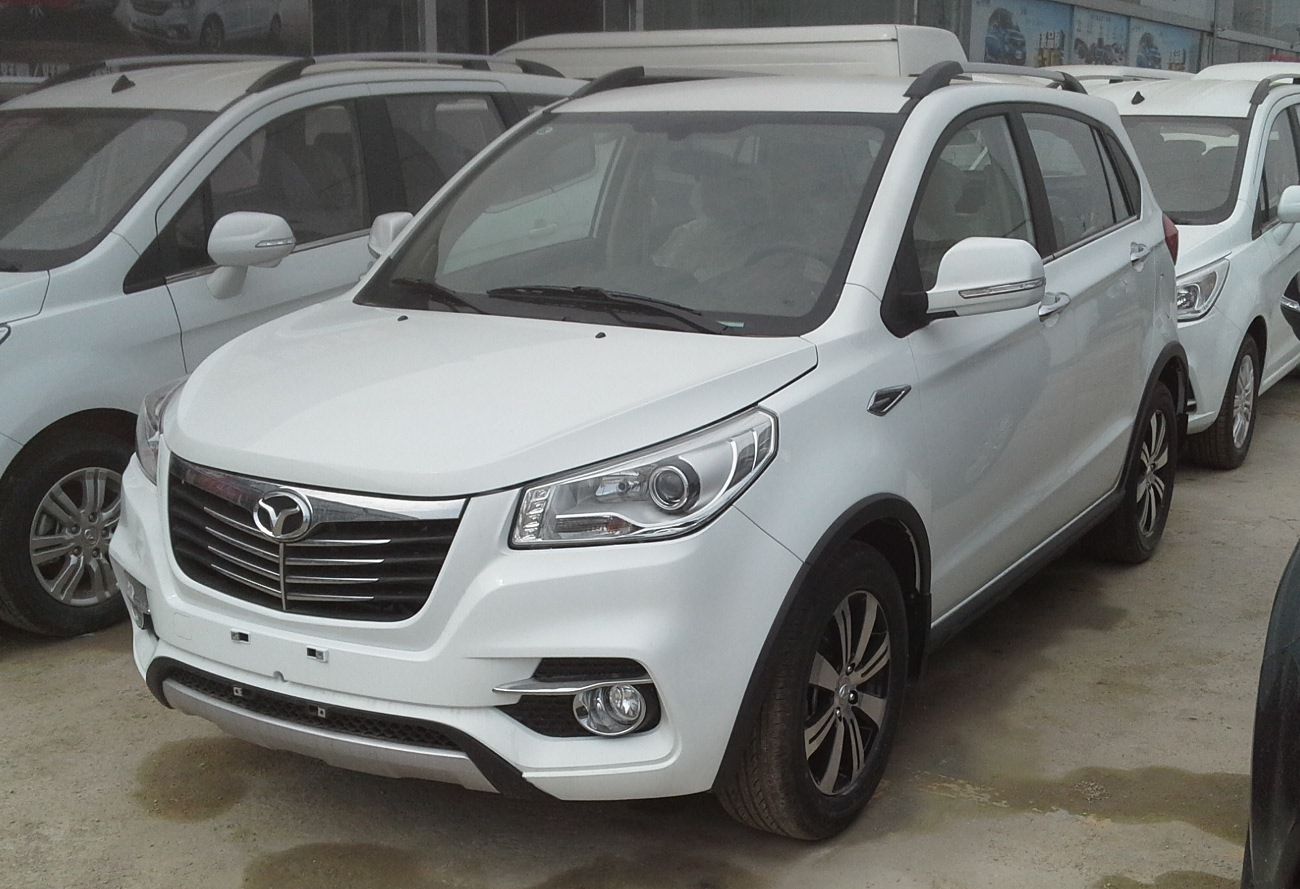
Enranger G3
