= VGV =

VGV may refer to:

- VGV, an automobile marque of vehicles produced by Weichai (Chongqing) Automotive
- VGV, the ICAO airline code for Vologda Aviation Enterprise
- VGV, an isoform of the 5-HT2C receptor
