= Ernest Norton (cricketer) =

English cricketer

Cricket information
- Batting: Right-handed
- Bowling: Leg-break googly

Career statistics
Competition	First-class
Matches	8
Runs scored	108
Batting average	15.42
100s/50s	0/0
Top score	26*
Balls bowled	576
Wickets	71
Bowling average	51.00
5 wickets in innings	0
10 wickets in match	0
Best bowling	3/74
Catches/stumpings	2/–
- Source: Cricinfo, 8 November 2022

Ernest Willmott Norton, registered at birth as Ernest Willmott (19 June 1889 – 14 March 1972) was an English first-class cricketer who played eight matches in the early 1920s: two for Warwickshire and then six for Worcestershire.

Norton made his debut for Warwickshire against Leicestershire at Edgbaston at the end of June 1920, making an unbeaten 26 (which was to remain his career best) from number ten in his only innings. Immediately afterwards, he appeared against Sussex at the same venue, but only 58 overs were possible and his only contribution was five wicketless overs for 19 runs.

His next first-class appearance was not for almost two years, and when he did play again in June 1922 it was for a very weak Worcestershire side destined to finish bottom of the County Championship. His second game for his new county, against Northamptonshire at Worcester, brought him his first wicket (that of John Howman) and indeed what were to remain his best bowling figures of 3–74.

Norton played four more times for Worcestershire, but the county lost them all: indeed, in his eight-match first-class career he was never part of a winning side. His final game was his only appearance of 1923, at Gravesend against Kent, and in an eight-wicket defeat his ten overs went without reward.

Norton was born in Sparkbrook, Birmingham; he died in Five Ways, also Birmingham, at the age of 82.
