= Qilu Bank =

Chinese commercial bank

Qilu Bank Co., Ltd.
- Trade name: Qilu Bank
- Native name: 齐鲁银行股份有限公司
- Company type: City commercial bank
- Traded as: SSE: 601665; SSE: 113065 (convertible bond)
- ISIN: CNE100005154
- Industry: Financial services
- Founded: June 5, 1996; 29 years ago in Jinan, China
- Headquarters: No. 10817, Jingshi Road, Yaojia Subdistrict, Lixia District, Jinan, China
- Area served: China
- Key people: Zheng Zugang (Chairman); Zhang Hua(President)
- Revenue: ▲RMB 11.064 billion (2022)
- Operating income: ▲RMB 3.869 billion (2022)
- Net income: ▲RMB 3.631 billion (2022)
- Total assets: ▲RMB 506.013 billion (2022)
- Total equity: ▲RMB 35.589 billion (2022)
- Owner: Commonwealth Bank (20%); Jinan State-owned Assets Operation Co (18%)
- Capital ratio: Not disclosed
- Rating: Not disclosed
- Website: www.qlbchina.com
- Footnotes / references All financial data are as of the end of 2022 and denominated in RMB unless otherwise specified

Qilu Bank Co., Ltd. (SSE: 601665) is a city commercial bank in mainland China, formed through the merger of Shandong Provincial Commercial Bank and Jinan City Commercial Bank. The head office is located in Jinan, Shandong, with branches established in all 16 prefecture-level cities within the province and outside the province in Beijing, Tianjin, Zhengzhou, Kaifeng (including Lankao County), Lianyungang, Xuzhou, Nanjing, and Shanghai.

== Development history ==
=== Former Shandong Provincial Commercial Bank ===
- In March 1995, with approval from the People's Government of Shandong, Shandong Provincial Commercial Bank was established, and began gradually setting up branches in all 17 prefecture-level cities across the province.
- On September 8, 2004, a strategic cooperation was successfully achieved with the Commonwealth Bank.
- On November 30, 2005, the first out-of-province branch, the Tianjin Branch, was opened.

=== Former Jinan City Commercial Bank ===
- On June 6, 1996, Jinan Urban Cooperative Bank was established based on 16 urban credit cooperatives and 1 urban credit cooperative association in Jinan.
- On June 6, 1998, "Jinan Urban Cooperative Bank" was renamed as Jinan City Commercial bank.
- On March 19, 2008, the first non-local branch, the Liaocheng Branch, was opened.

=== Merger into Qilu Bank ===
- On June 6, 2009, Shandong Provincial Commercial Bank and Jinan City Commercial Bank merged and were renamed as the current Qilu Bank.

== Top 10 Shareholders ==
As at June 2024, the top 10 shareholders of Qil] Bank and their shareholding status are:

Shareholder Name	Number of Shares	Shareholding Ratio (%)
Commonwealth Bank	473,750,000	20.00
State-owned Assets Supervision and Administration Commission of Shandong Province	422,500,000	17.84
Jigang Group	117,000,000	4.94
Jinan Economic Development Investment Corporation	115,313,957	4.87
Shandong Jianbang Investment Management	106,000,000	4.47
Rizhao Steel Holding Group	100,000,000	4.22
Shandong Sanqing Real Estate Co	99,000,000	4.18
China National Heavy Duty Truck Group	70,500,000	2.98
Zhongrun Futai Investment Co	45,000,000	1.90
Luxin Group Co	40,000,000	1.69

== Bill Fraud Case ==
At the end of 2010, a bill fraud case occurred at Qilu Bank, involving an amount between RMB 1 billion and 1.5 billion. The main figure in the case, Liu Jiyuan, attracted large depositors to Qilu Bank by offering high interest rates. Then, the bank's business manager colluded with Liu Jiyuan to issue flawed certificates of deposit, which were used as collateral for loans. The cash obtained from the loans was then redeposited, creating a cycle that expanded the scale of deposits and loans.

PwC Zhong Tian raised questions in its audit regarding the legitimacy of RMB 4.8 billion in "pledged deposit" loans recorded in Qilu Bank's 2009 financial statements, as well as concerns about borrowers’ repayment capacity, and issued a qualified opinion. Qilu Bank subsequently replaced its auditor.

Due to the impact of the fraud case, Chairman Qiu Yunzhang and President Guo Tao of Qilu Bank were dismissed.
