= VGV U70 =

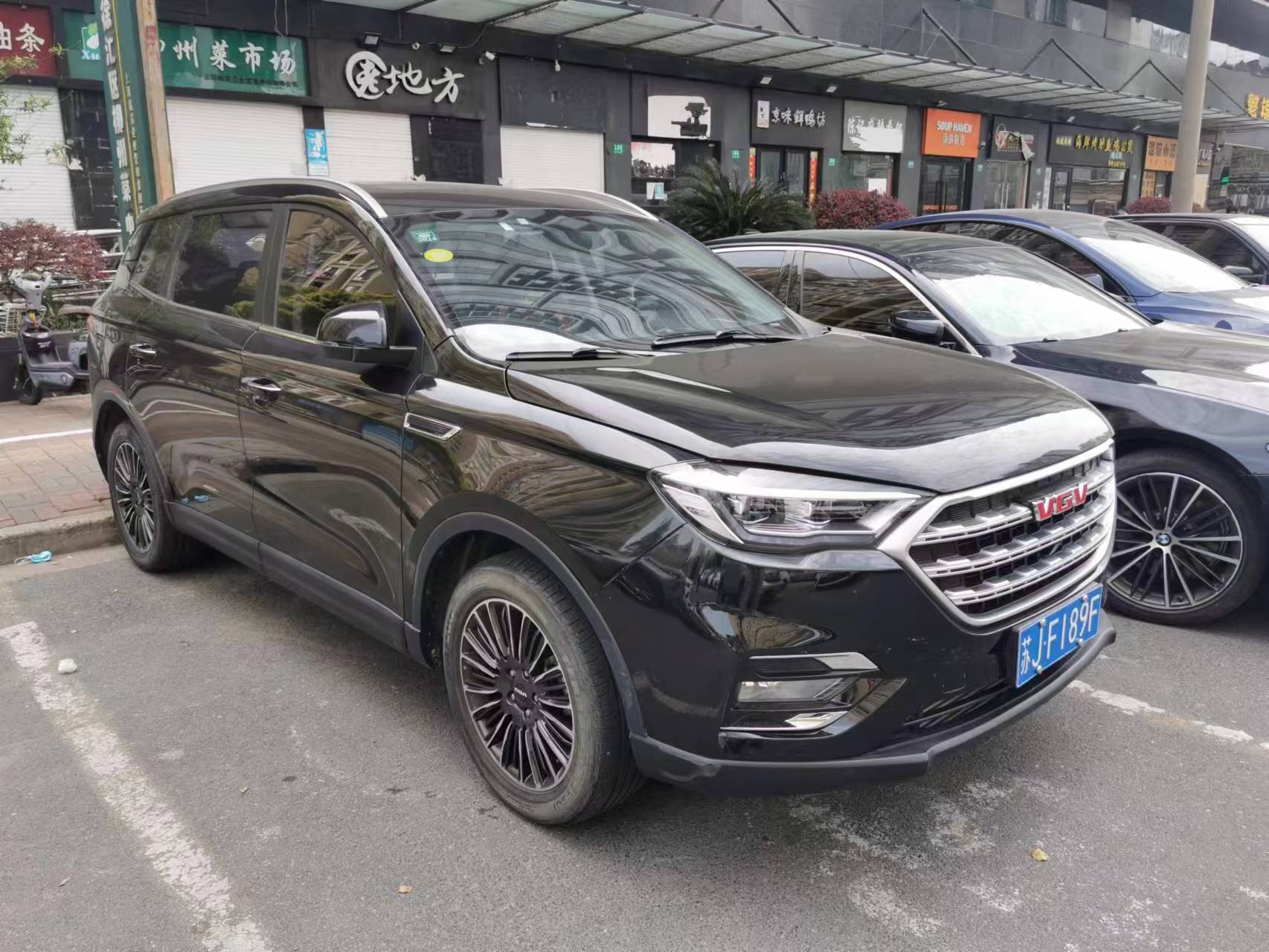

Overview
- Manufacturer: VGV-Weichai (Chongqing) Automotive
- Also called: VGV U75 Plus (Azerbaijan); VGV VX7 (pickup); GTV Krusar (pickup, Cambodia)
- Production: 2019–present
- Model years: 2019–present

Body and chassis
- Class: Mid-size crossover SUV; Pickup truck (VX7)
- Body style: 5-door station wagon 4-door Pickup truck
- Layout: FF

Powertrain
- Engine: 1.5L Turbo I4
- Transmission: 6-speed automatic 6-speed manual

Dimensions
- Wheelbase: 2,800 mm (110.2 in)
- Length: 4,806 mm (189.2 in); 4,825 mm (190.0 in) (U75 Plus); 5,015 mm (197.4 in) (VX7)
- Width: 1,870 mm (73.6 in)
- Height: 1,691 mm (66.6 in); 1,732 mm (68.2 in) (VX7)
- Curb weight: 1,541–1,565 kg (3,397–3,450 lb)

The VGV U70 is a 5- to 7-seat mid-size crossover SUV produced by VGV, a sub-brand of Weichai (Chongqing) Automotive from 2019.

== History ==
As early as January 2019, the winter testing spy photos of the Weichai Enranger 7-seat crossover SUV has been seen in the Chinese media. By August 2019, images of the Weichai Enranger U70 has been obtained from the China MIIT, and at the time declared as an all-new SUV model from Weichai Enranger. In November 2019, the Weichai U70 was launched. Despite marketed as a Weichai brand vehicle, the show car wears the VGV logo. As of 2020, Chinese automotive media has been labeling the VGV U70 under the VGV brand of China National Heavy Duty Truck Group while in article mentions, the name remains to be Weichai U70.

=== Powertrain ===
The VGV U70 is powered by a 1.5 liter inline-four turbo engine producing 156Ps and 115 kW, with the engine mated to either a 6-speed manual gearbox or a 6-speed automatic gearbox.

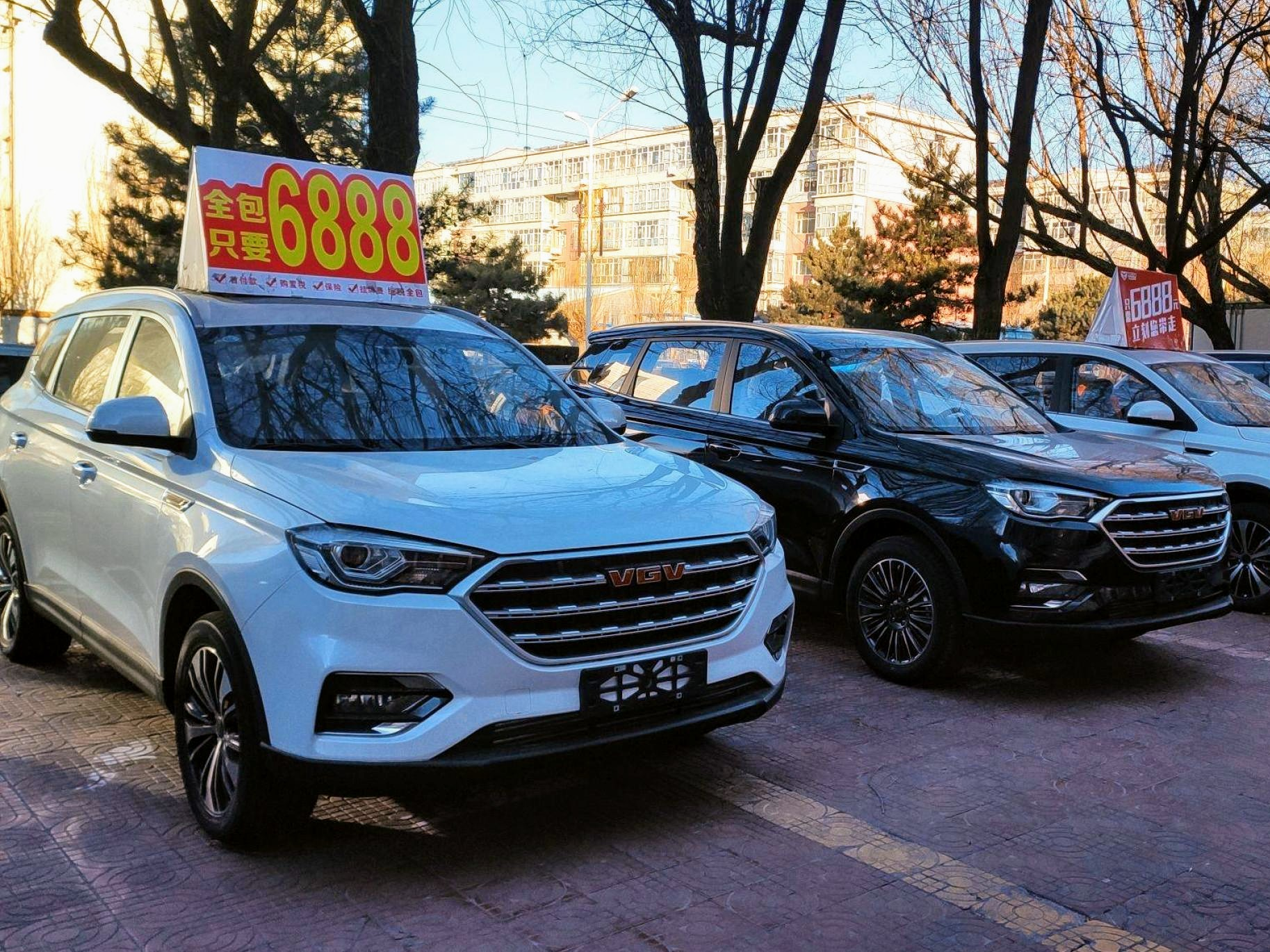
VGV U70 at the dealership

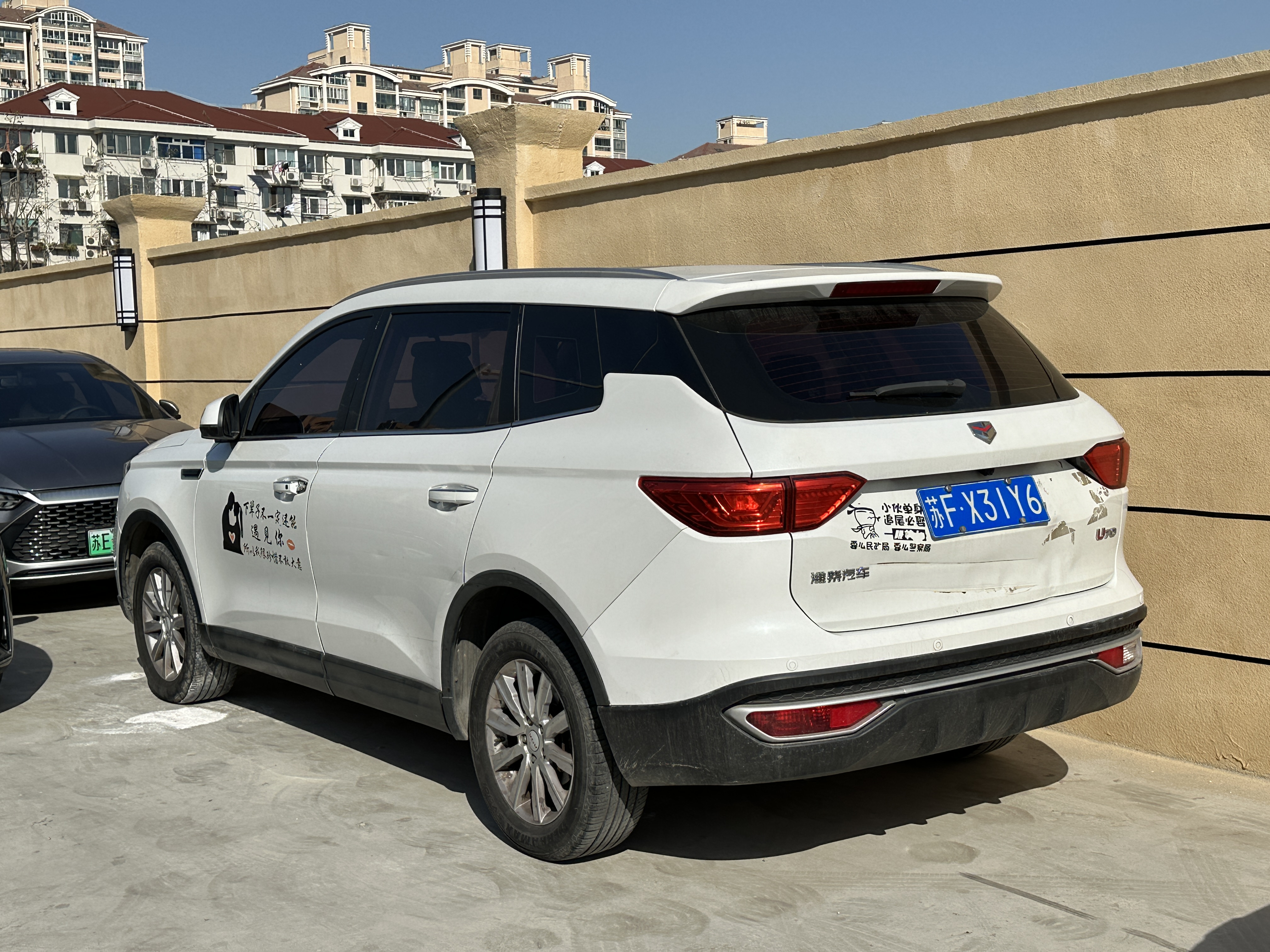
VGV U70 (rear)

== VGV U75 Plus ==
The U75 Plus is a sportier and more premium variant of the U70 featuring slightly redesigned exterior details and a more powerful powertrain. The U75 Plus is powered by a 2.0-litre turbo engine mated to an 8-speed automatic transmission developing 224 hp and 385N·m.

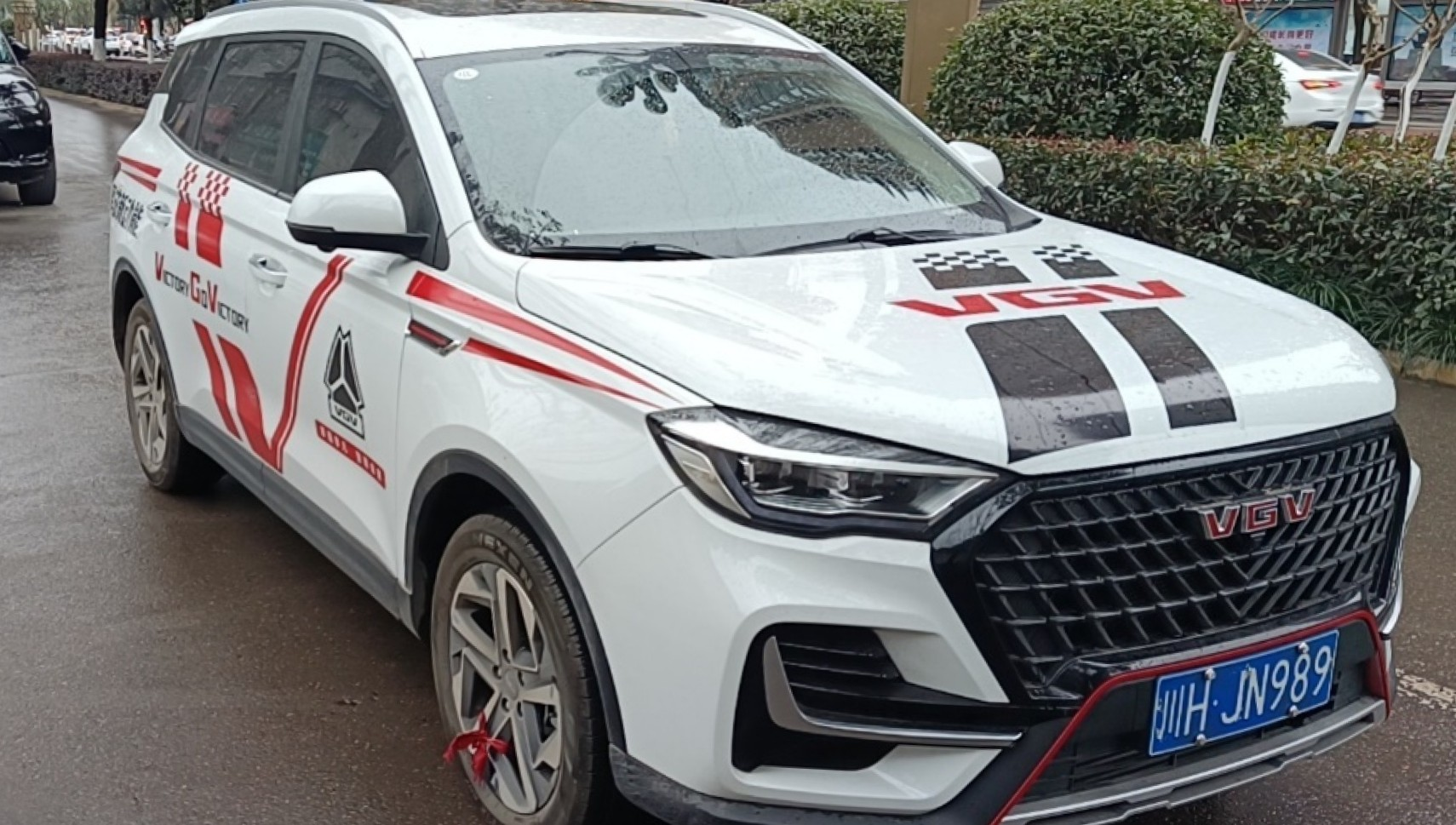
VGV U75 Plus

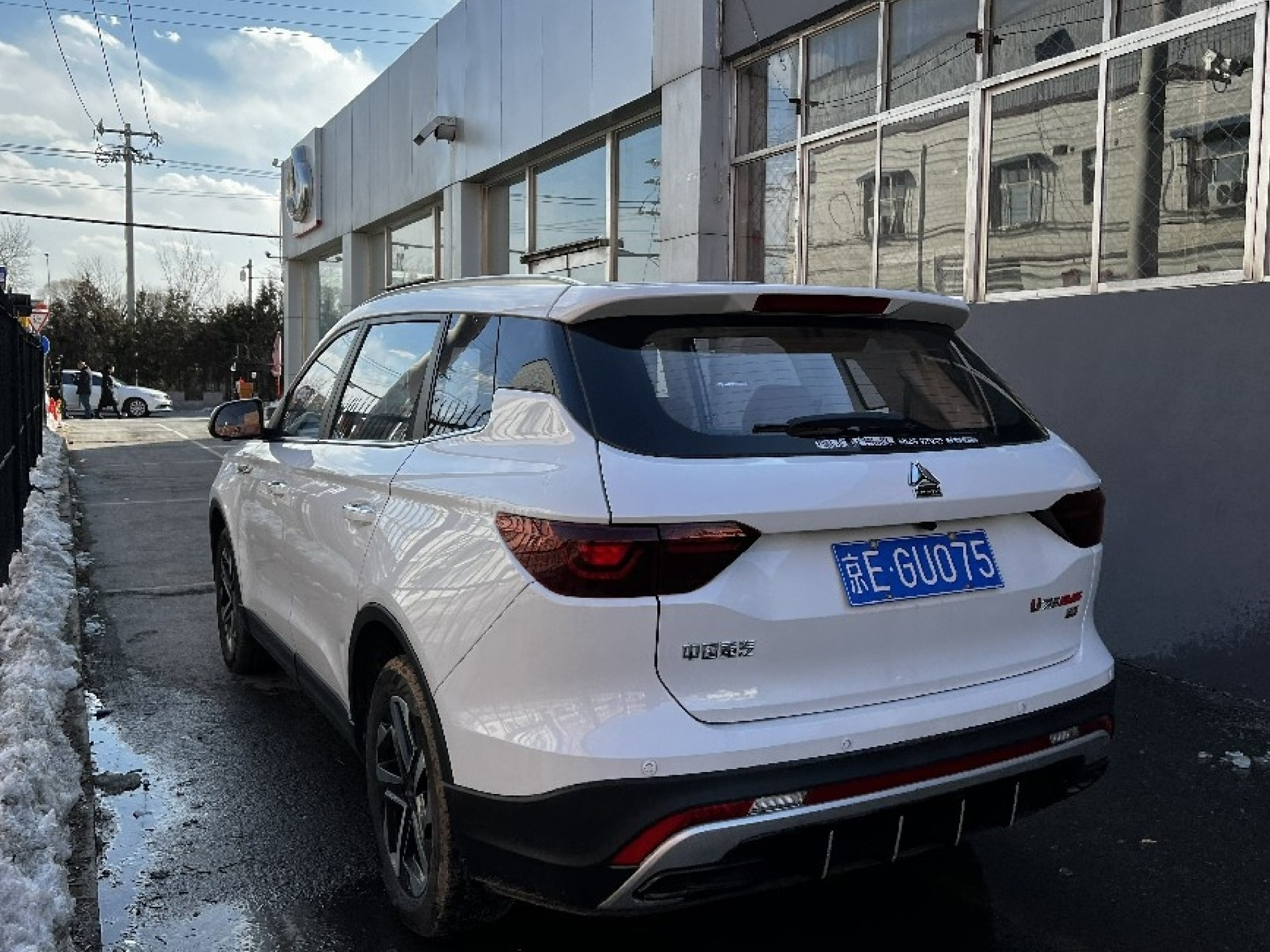
VGV U75 Plus (rear)

== VGV VX7 ==
The VGV VX7 is a sport utility truck or ute variant of the U75 Plus featuring the same front end design and powertrain. A version of the VX7 equipped with a slantback rear cover was also unveiled at the same time dubbed the "Pet's First Class" edition. The VX7 has a top speed of 196 kilometers per hour. The cargo bed dimensions are 1114 mm by 1438 mm by 588 mm and it is capable of a 330 kg tent carrying capacity.

In 2024, the VX7 was introduced to the Cambodian market rebadged as the GTV Krusar (Krusar meaning "family" in Khmer) by GTV Motor Cambodia. The Cambodian version retained the VX7’s body and mechanicals, including a 2.0‑litre turbocharged petrol engine paired with an 8‑speed automatic transmission, and was marketed as a dual‑cab pickup aimed at local buyers. Standard features include LED headlights and taillights, a multifunction touchscreen infotainment system, leather‑trimmed seating, a 360‑degree camera, electronic parking brake with auto‑hold, and multiple advanced driver‑assistance systems. At launch, pricing in Cambodia was set at US$27,999 for the "Half" option and US$29,999 for the "Full" option for local buyers, while export prices were US$35,500 and US$37,900 respectively.

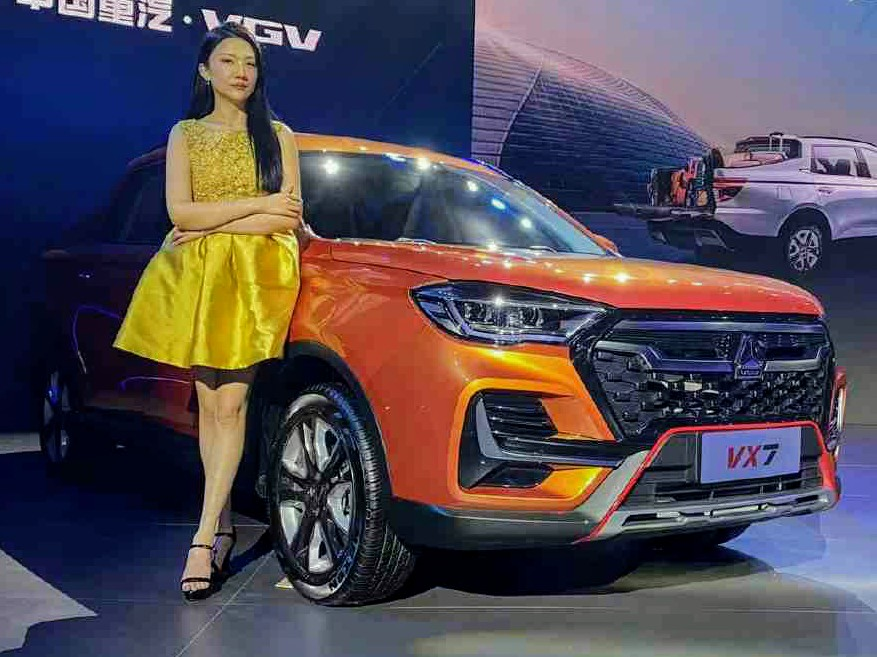
VGV VX7

VGV VX7 (rear)
