= Sinotruk Bolden =

Mid-size pickup truck

- Sinotruk Bolden S7

Overview
- Manufacturer: China National Heavy Duty Truck Group
- Also called: Sinotruk Bosheng (搏胜); Sinotruk Bolden S6; Sinotruk Bolden S7; Sinotruk Bolden S9; Sinotruk Howo S6; Sinotruk Howo S7; Sinotruk Howo S9
- Production: 2024–present
- Assembly: China

Body and chassis
- Class: Mid-size pickup truck
- Body style: 4-door pickup truck
- Layout: Front-engine, rear-wheel drive; Front-engine, four-wheel drive

Powertrain
- Engine: Diesel: 2.0 L Weichai WP2H I4 turbodiesel
- Power output: 120 kW (160 hp; 160 PS) (2.0 diesel)
- Transmission: 6-speed manual; 8-speed ZF 8HP automatic; 1-speed direct-drive (EV)

Dimensions
- Wheelbase: 3,230 mm (127 in) (SWB); 3,470 mm (137 in) (LWB)
- Length: 5,365 mm (211 in) (SWB); 5,645 mm (222 in) (LWB)
- Width: 1,895 mm (75 in)
- Height: 1,890 mm (74 in)

The Sinotruk Bolden (Chinese: 搏胜; pinyin: Bó shèng) is a range of mid-size pickup trucks manufactured by the Chinese automaker China National Heavy Duty Truck Group and Weichai Auto since 2024.

== Overview ==
The Bolden debuted on 28 June 2024, during a launch event at the Xueye Lake in Jinan, Shandong. It is available in three different versions, including a S7 standard passenger model, an S9 off-road model, and a S6 commercial-oriented model. An electric version was also revealed but was not available at launch.

The Bolden is built on a ladder chassis, and is powered by a 2.0 liter turbocharged inline-four Weichai diesel engine code-named WP2H, with a maximum output of 140 kW and 420 Nm. The four-wheel drive is optional, and the transmission is an 8-speed automatic gearbox or a 6-speed manual. The standard cargo bed is sized 1,520mm x 1,520mm x 530mm, while the LWD variant has cargo bed sized 1,800mm × 1,520mm × 530 mm. The commercial Bolden S6 utilizes a suspension setup with rear leaf spring rigid axle, while the passenger Bolden S7 and off-road Bolden S9 employ a multi-link solid axle rear suspension. Additionally, the Bolden S9 also come equipped with a BorgWarner's 4WD transfer case featuring 2H, 4H, and 4L modes.

Sinotruk Howo S6

Rear view

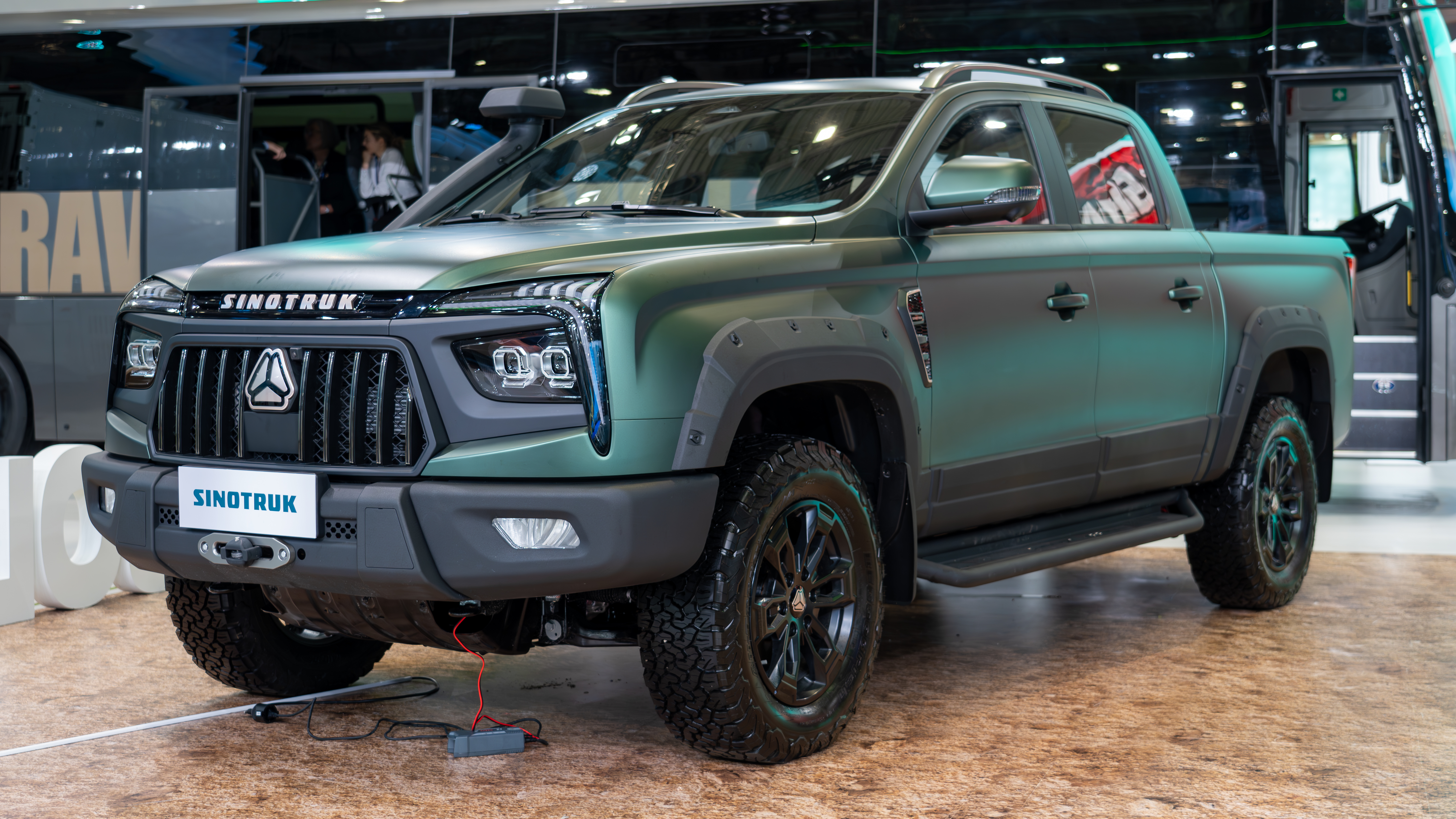
Sinotruk Bolden S9
