= Sinotruk Pioneer V =

Series of vans

Overview
- Manufacturer: China National Heavy Duty Truck Group
- Also called: Sinotruk Pioneer L; Sinotruk Pioneer R
- Production: 2024–present
- Assembly: China

Body and chassis
- Class: Large MPV (M); Light commercial vehicle (M)
- Body style: 5-door minivan
- Layout: Front-engine, front-wheel-drive; Front-engine, rear-wheel-drive (Pioneer R)

Powertrain
- Engine: Diesel: 2.0 L WP2H160E62 TDI I4
- Transmission: 6-speed manual; 8-speed automatic
- Hybrid drivetrain: PHEV
- Battery: 13 (10.4 usable) kWh lithium-ion

Dimensions
- Wheelbase: Short wheelbase: 3,100 mm (122.0 in); Long wheelbase: 3,500 mm (137.8 in)
- Length: Short wheelbase: 5,092 mm (200.5 in); Long wheelbase: 5,492 mm (216.2 in)
- Width: 2,069 mm (81.5 in)
- Height: Pioneer V regular roof: 2,090 mm (82.3 in); Pioneer V raised roof/Pioneer L: 2,319 mm (91.3 in); Pioneer R regular roof: 2,110 mm (83.1 in); Pioneer R raised roof: 2,339 mm (92.1 in)

The Sinotruk Pioneer V (先锋官V) is a light commercial and passenger van developed by Sinotruk (CNHTC) and Weichai Auto. It was first introduced in December 2024.

== Overview ==
Rear view

The Pioneer V has a seating layout for 4 to 9 passengers. In terms of power, the Pioneer V and extended variants are powered by a 2.0 liter turbo diesel engine supplied by Weichai Power. When mounted transversely for the Pioneer V and Pioneer L, the engine develops 115 kW (154 hp) and 400 N⋅m (295 lb⋅ft).

An electric variant is also available simply named the Pioneer EV. The Pioneer EV is equipped with a CATL-supplied LFP Battery that supports a NEDC range of 506km. Fast Charging from 30% to 80% SoC could be completed in 36 Minutes. The front-positioned electric motor produces 156 kW (209 hp) and 330 N⋅m (243 lb⋅ft) of torque.

== Sinotruk Pioneer L ==
In December 2025, a more premium variant based on the Pioneer V named the Pioneer L was introduced. Only available as a long wheelbase model, the Pioneer L was targeted towards premium commercial and business users with a more luxurious interior featuring first class style seats.

== Sinotruk Pioneer R ==
Introduced alongside of the Pioneer L in December 2025, the Pioneer R is the longitudinal rear-wheel-drive variant while sharing identical exterior looks with the regular Pioneer V. The Pioneer R is loaded with features targeted towards camper van markets, including a 48-volt duo generator setup for camping activities. In terms of power output, the longitudinal engine setup develops 140 kW (188 hp) which is a 27% bump from the front-wheel-drive Pioneer V and it develops a torque of 420 N⋅m (310 lb⋅ft).
