= GGG =

GGG or Triple G may refer to:

== Media ==
- GGG, the production code for the 1971 Doctor Who serial The Claws of Axos
- German Goo Girls, a series of pornographic films by John Thompson Productions
- Grinding Gear Games, a New Zealand video game developer company
- Gunnar Graps Group, an Estonian rock group
- Guns, God and Government, the third live video album by American rock band Marilyn Manson
- Gutsy Geoid Guard, antagonists from the Japanese anime television series The King of Braves GaoGaiGar
- Guy's Grocery Games, an American reality-based cooking television game show
- Ward Hayden and The Outliers (previously Girls, Guns and Glory), a band from Boston, Massachusetts

== Organisations ==
- Germanische Glaubens-Gemeinschaft, a group involved in Germanic neopaganism in Germany
- Gesellschaft für das Gute und Gemeinnützige, a private, non-profit organization founded in 1777
- Good and Green Guyana, a political party in Guyana
- Graco (fluid handling) (NYSE: GGG), an American fluid handling company
- Greenland Minerals (ASX ticker symbol: GGG), an Australian exploration company

== People ==
- Gentaro (wrestler) (born 1974), Japanese professional wrestler
- Gennady Golovkin (born 1982), Kazakhstani professional boxer

== Other ==
- East Texas Regional Airport (IATA code & FAA LID: GGG), an airport located in Gregg County, Texas
- Gadolinium gallium garnet, a synthetic crystalline material of the garnet group
- GGG ("good, giving, and game"), a sex-positive ideal coined by sex-advice columnist Dan Savage
- Giant Global Graph, a neologism to differentiate between the existing World Wide Web and that of Web 3.0
- Gurgula language (ISO 639-3 code: ggg), a Rajasthani language of Pakistan
- GGG, a codon for the amino acid glycine

== See also ==
- 3G (disambiguation)
- G3 (disambiguation)
