= 3G (disambiguation) =

3G is a generation of standards for mobile telecommunication.

3G may also refer to:

== Arts, entertainment, and media ==
- 3G (film), a Bollywood film
- Apartment 3-G, an American newspaper comic strip about a trio of career women
- Stephane & 3G, a Georgian pop group
- "3G", a song by Yeat featuring Lil Uzi Vert from the deluxe edition of 2 Alive (2022)
- 3-G Home Video/3-G Productions, a distributor of various media on VHS in 1980s and 1990s

== Computing and telecommunications ==
- Hutchison 3G, a brand name under which several UMTS-based mobile phone networks operate
- iPhone 3G, a smartphone sold by Apple Inc in 2008.
- iPhone 3GS, a smartphone sold by Apple Inc in 2009.
- NTFS-3G, an open-source cross-platform implementation of the Microsoft Windows NTFS file system

== Government ==
- 3G (countries) or Global Growth Generators countries (the most promising growth prospects countries)
- Global Governance Group (or GGG), an informal group of smaller and medium-sized counties represented in the G20 summits
- 3G-Regel, COVID-19 health pass system in Germany and Austria where most venues and businesses in both countries are restricted to patrons who are either vaccinated, recovered from previous COVID-19 infection, or tested within 72 hours.

== Other uses ==
- 3G, a third-generation immigrant; see Immigrant generations
- 3G Capital, a Brazilian investment firm
- 3G pitch, a third-generation astroturf, used in many sports such as football
- CURB/Agajanian/3G Racing, a team in the Indy Racing League IndyCar Series and NASCAR Nationwide Series
- Sudan Yellow 3G, a yellow azo dye
- 3G, a tram model produced by now-defunct Dutch company Beijnes

== See also ==
- G3 (disambiguation)
- GGG (disambiguation)
