= G3 Free Trade Agreement =

Colombia-Mexico-Venezuela Agreement

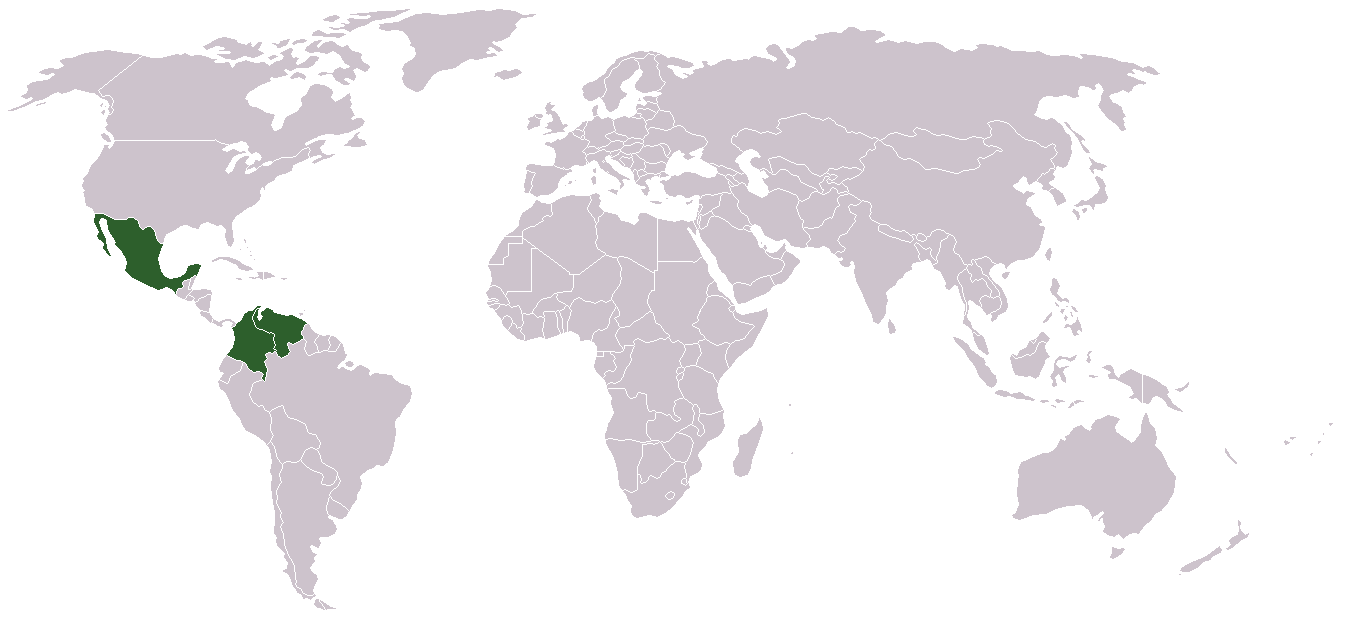
The G3 countries are Colombia, Mexico and Venezuela. Venezuela left the bloc in November 2006.

The G-3 was a free trade agreement between Colombia, Mexico, and Venezuela that came into effect on January 1, 1995, which created an extended market of 149 million consumers with a combined GDP (Gross domestic product) of US$486.5 billion. The agreement states a ten percent tariff reduction over ten years (starting in 1995) for the trade of goods and services among its members. The agreement is a third generation one, not limited to liberalizing trade, but includes issues such as investment, services, government purchases, regulations to fight unfair competition, and intellectual property rights.

Venezuelan President Hugo Chávez announced in May 2006 that his country would withdraw from the trade bloc, due to differences with its two partners. In April, Venezuela had also announced its plans to leave the Andean Community, after Colombia and Peru reached free trade agreements with the United States and Ecuador kept in negotiations for one. Venezuela then joined Mercosur, while Mexico and Colombia founded the Pacific Alliance along with Peru and Chile.

== See also ==
- Pacific Alliance
- G3 (disambiguation)
- Trade bloc
- Andean Community of Nations
- North American Free Trade Agreement (NAFTA)
- Central America Free Trade Agreement (CAFTA)
- Mercosur
- Free Trade Area of the Americas
- UNASUR
