= Howman =

Howman is a surname. Notable people with the surname include:

- Chloe Howman (born 1978), English actress, daughter of Karl
- Jack Howman (1919–2002), Zimbabwean politician
- John Howman (1895–1958), English cricketer
- Karl Howman (born 1953), English actor and voice actor

== See also ==
- Bowman (surname)
