= Enranger G3 =

Chinese automobile

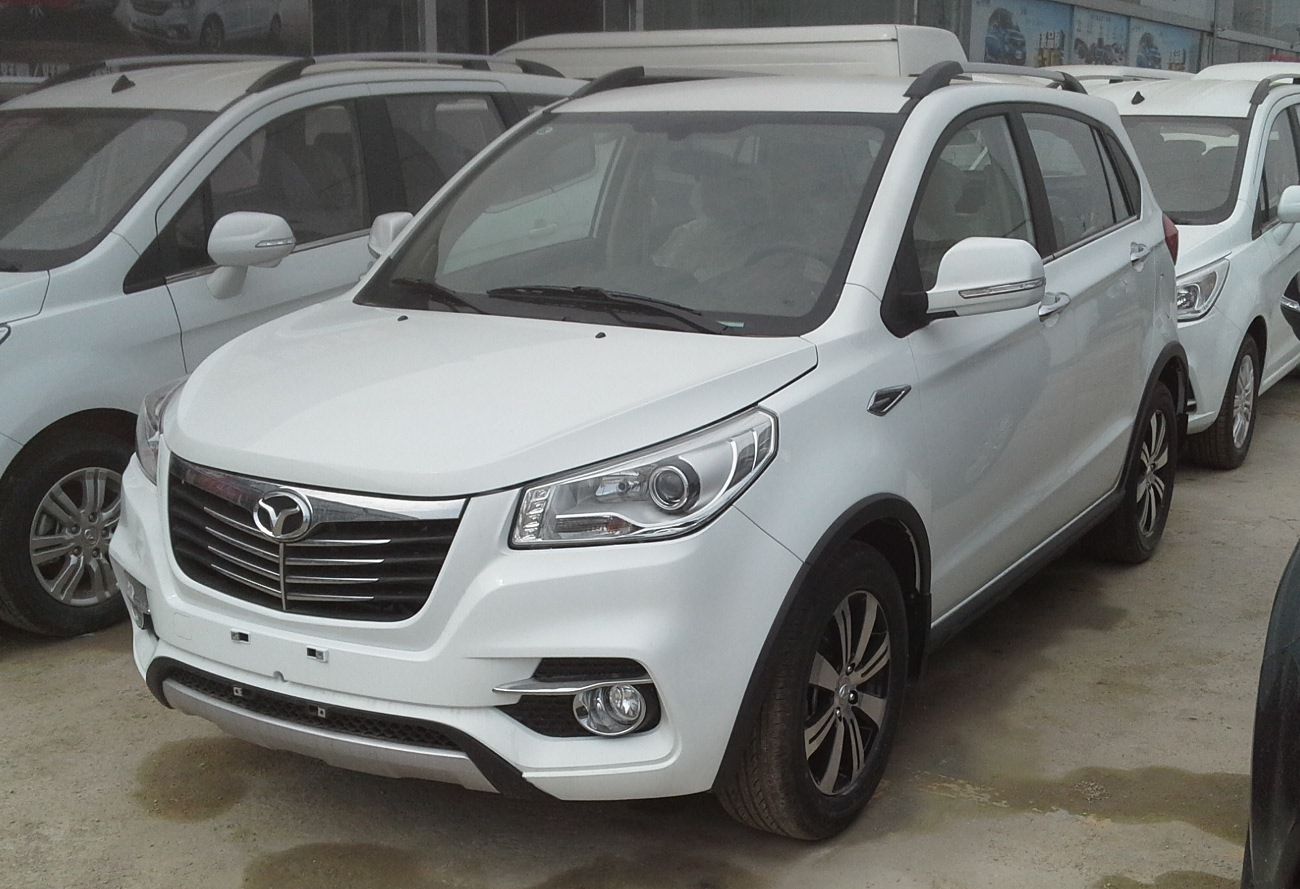
- Enranger G3

Overview
- Manufacturer: Weichai Auto
- Production: 2014–2020
- Assembly: Weifang, Shandong, China

Body and chassis
- Class: Subcompact crossover SUV
- Body style: 5-door hatchback
- Layout: Front-engine, front-wheel-drive

Powertrain
- Engine: 1.5 L I4 gasoline
- Transmission: CVT; 5-speed manual

Dimensions
- Wheelbase: 2,502 mm (99 in)
- Length: 4,066 mm (160 in)
- Width: 1,737 mm (68 in)
- Height: 1,657 mm (65 in)

The Enranger G3 is a subcompact crossover SUV manufactured in China by Weichai Auto under the Enranger or Yingzhi (英致) brand.

== Overview ==
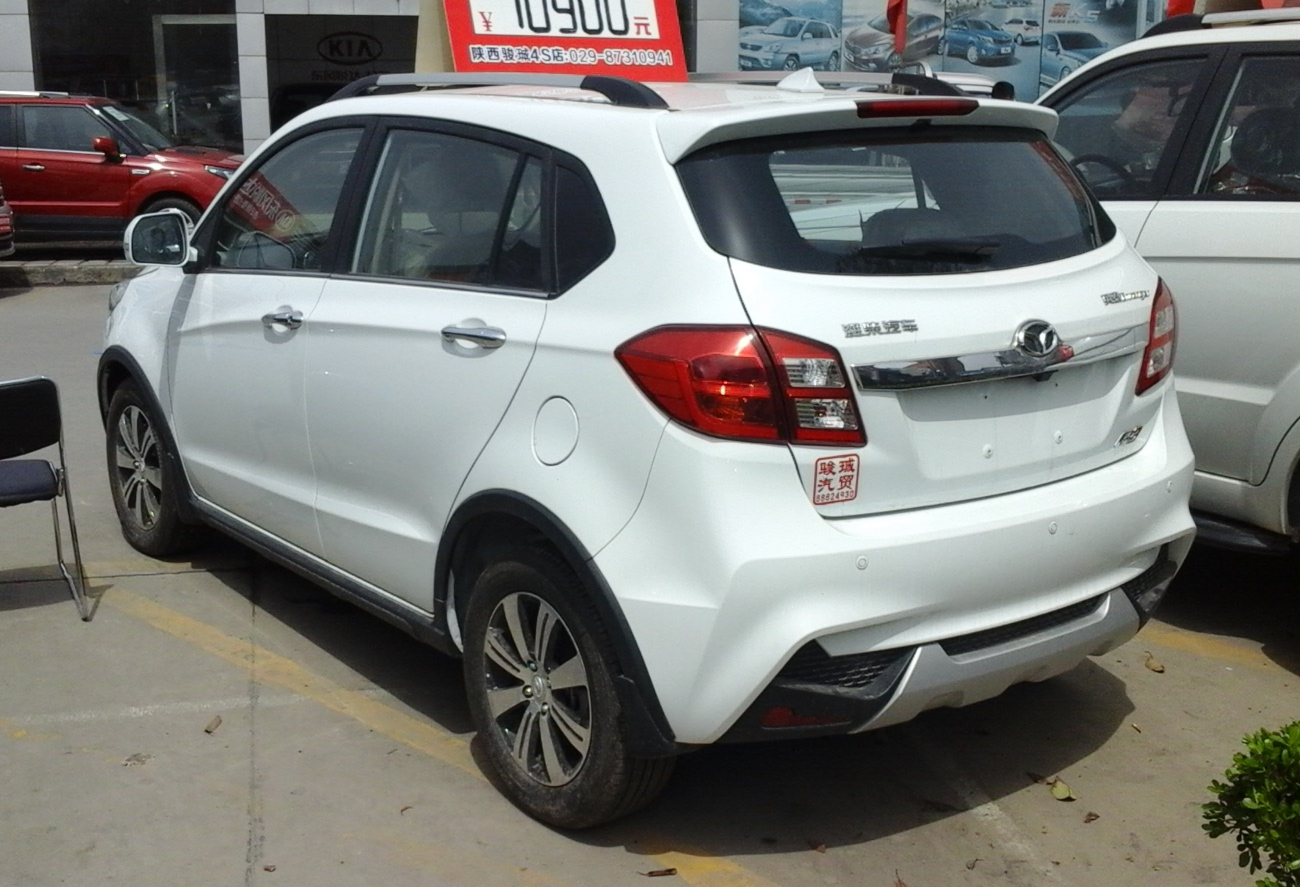
Pre-facelift G3

Formerly known as the Yingzhi S201, the Enranger G3 (or Yingzhi G3) was Weichai Auto's first car, and launched the Enranger brand.

The Enranger G3 subcompact crossover was first shown in 2014 in the departure hall of Weifang Airport near the city of Weifang in Shandong Province before officially debuting on the 2014 Beijing Auto Show.

In 2016, a facelift was launched during the 2016 Beijing Auto Show, featuring an updated interior with a touch screen.

The Enranger G3 was available on the Chinese auto market from August 2014 with prices of the G3 ranging from 57,900 yuan to 70,900 yuan. As of March 2019, prices of the G3 was adjusted to a range from 56,900 yuan to 80,800 yuan.

== Engine ==
The engine of the Enranger G3 is a 1.5 liter four-cylinder petrol engine producing 102hp and 141nm of torque, mated to a 5-speed manual gearbox or a CVT in a front wheel drive layout. The 1.5 liter engine was originally designed by Mitsubishi and is manufactured by Mianyang Power Machinery Corporation which was cooperating with Weichai Power.
