= Enranger 737 =

Chinese MPV

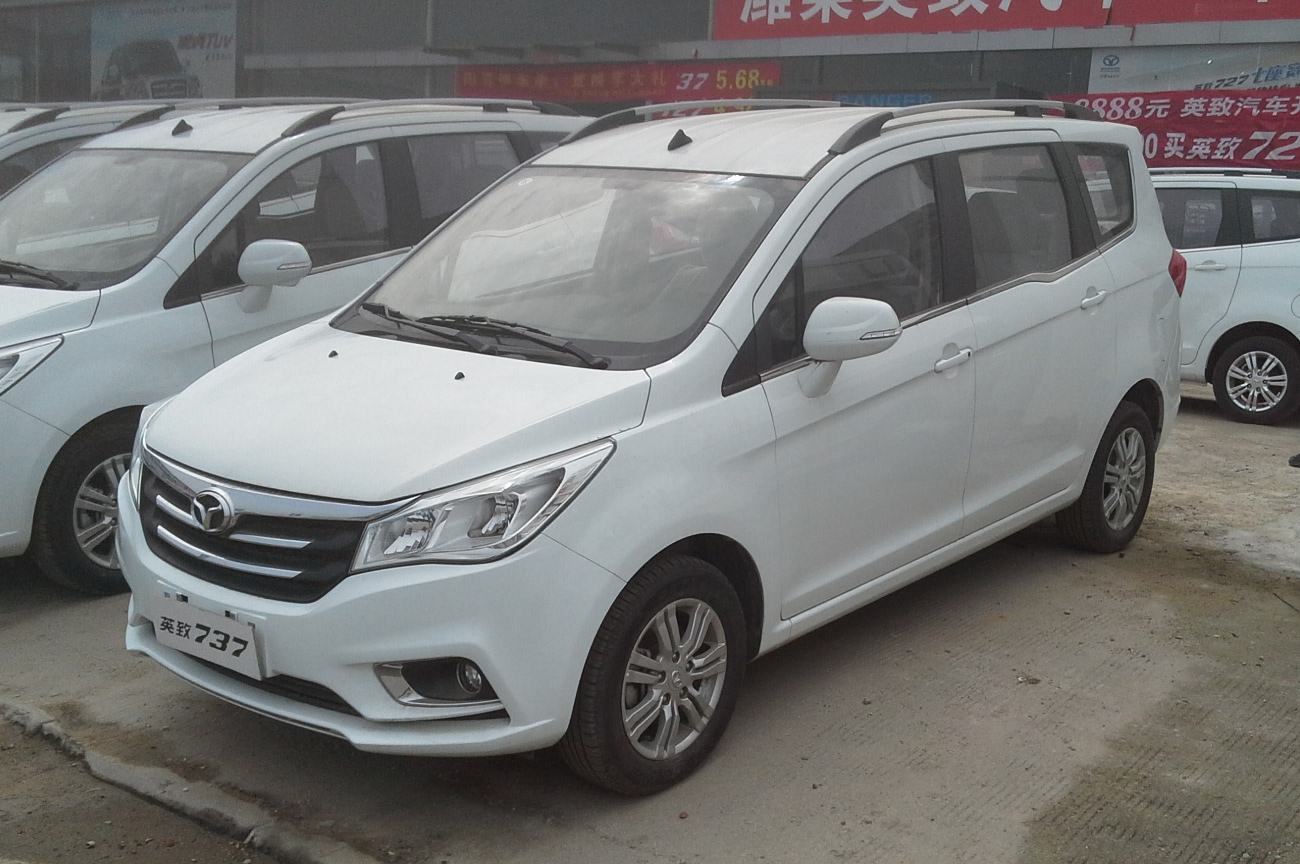

Overview
- Manufacturer: Weichai Auto
- Also called: Enranger 737 EV (electric version); Enranger 727 (lower trim version); Enranger G5 (crossover version)
- Production: 2015–present
- Assembly: Weifang, Shandong, China

Body and chassis
- Class: MPV
- Body style: 5-door minivan
- Layout: Front-engine, front-wheel-drive

Powertrain
- Engine: 1.5L four-cylinder petrol engine 1.5L four-cylinder turbo petrol engine
- Transmission: 5-speed manual CVT

Dimensions
- Wheelbase: 2,785 mm (109.6 in)
- Length: 4,508 mm (177.5 in)
- Width: 1,760 mm (69 in)
- Height: 1,715 mm (67.5 in)

The Enranger 737 is a seven-seater compact MPV in a configuration of 2-2-3 produced by Weichai Auto.

== Overview ==
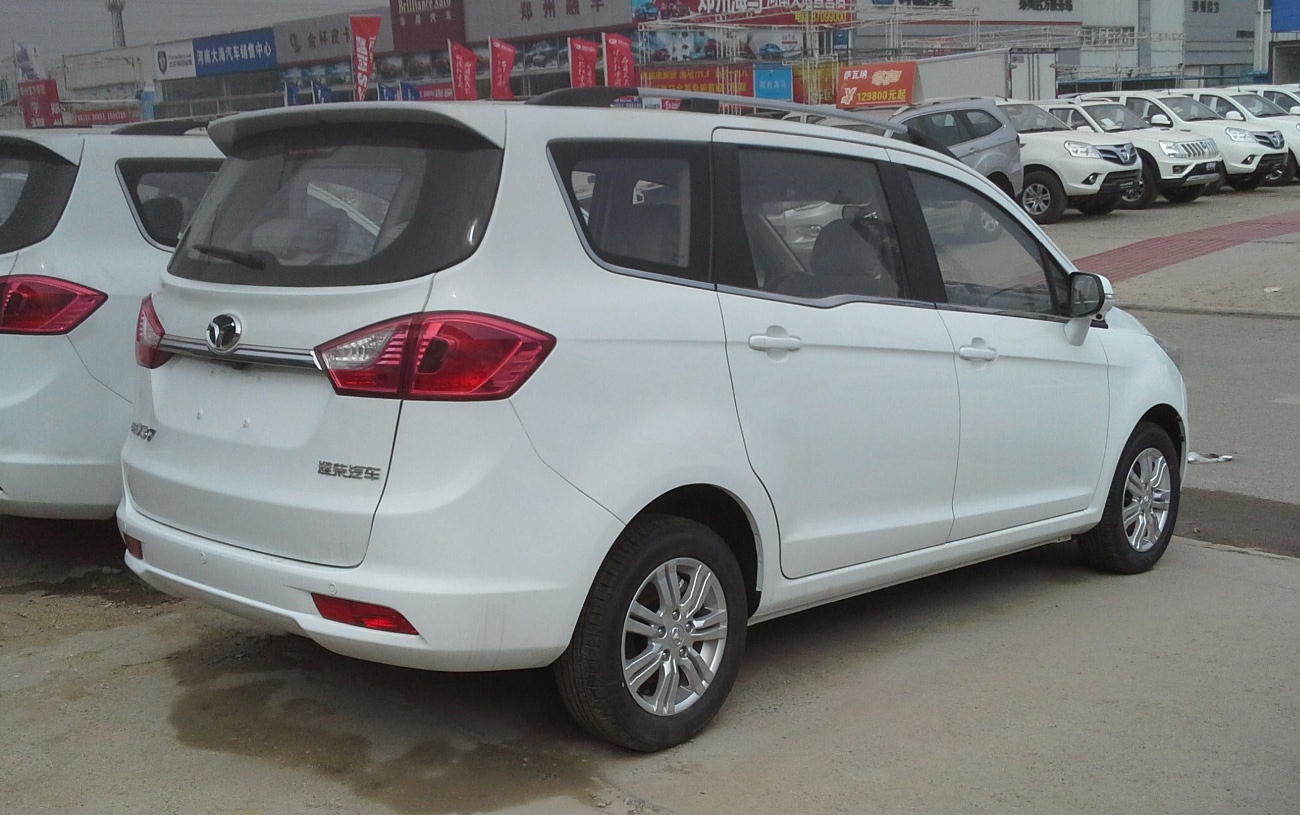
Enranger 737 rear quarter

Formerly known as the Yingzhi M301 during development phase, the Enranger 737 for China debuted during the 2015 Chengdu Auto Show in September 2015, and was launched on the Chinese car market in September 2015.

The name of the Enranger 737 was inspired by the Boeing 737 passenger jet, with pictures of a Boeing 737 displayed on a backdrop in the Weichai Auto factory (though the backdrop was actually displays of a 787 Dreamliner with "737" logo on the tail) during the launching ceremony of the Enranger 737 production line.

Price of the Enranger 737 starts from 56,800 yuan and ends at 99,800 yuan. The versions dubbed the Yingzhi 737 Internet Edition that features a 16-inch touch screen in the interior starts at 77,800 yuan. As of 2019, prices of the Enranger 737 were lowered to 49,800 yuan to 87,800 yuan.

=== Engines ===
There are two four-cylinder petrol engines options available for the Enranger 737, including a 1.5 liter producing 120 horsepower (89 kW; 122 PS) and a 1.5 liter turbo producing 150 horsepower (112 kW; 152 PS), both engines mated to a five-speed manual gearbox or a CVT.

== Enranger 737 EV ==
The Enranger 737 EV is the electric version of the Enranger 737 with only minor parts such as the grilles and front bumpers being redesigned. The Enranger 737 EV was powered by a front positioned 60-kilowatt (80 hp; 82 PS) electric motor powered by a 41.8 kWh battery capable of a range of 252 kilometres (157 mi). The Enranger 737 EV has an energy consumption of 17 kWh/100 km. Charging for the Enranger 737 EV takes one hour for an 80 percent charge via a fast charger and 13 hours for a slow full charge.

The price of the Enranger 737 EV is 146,800 yuan.

== Enranger 727 ==
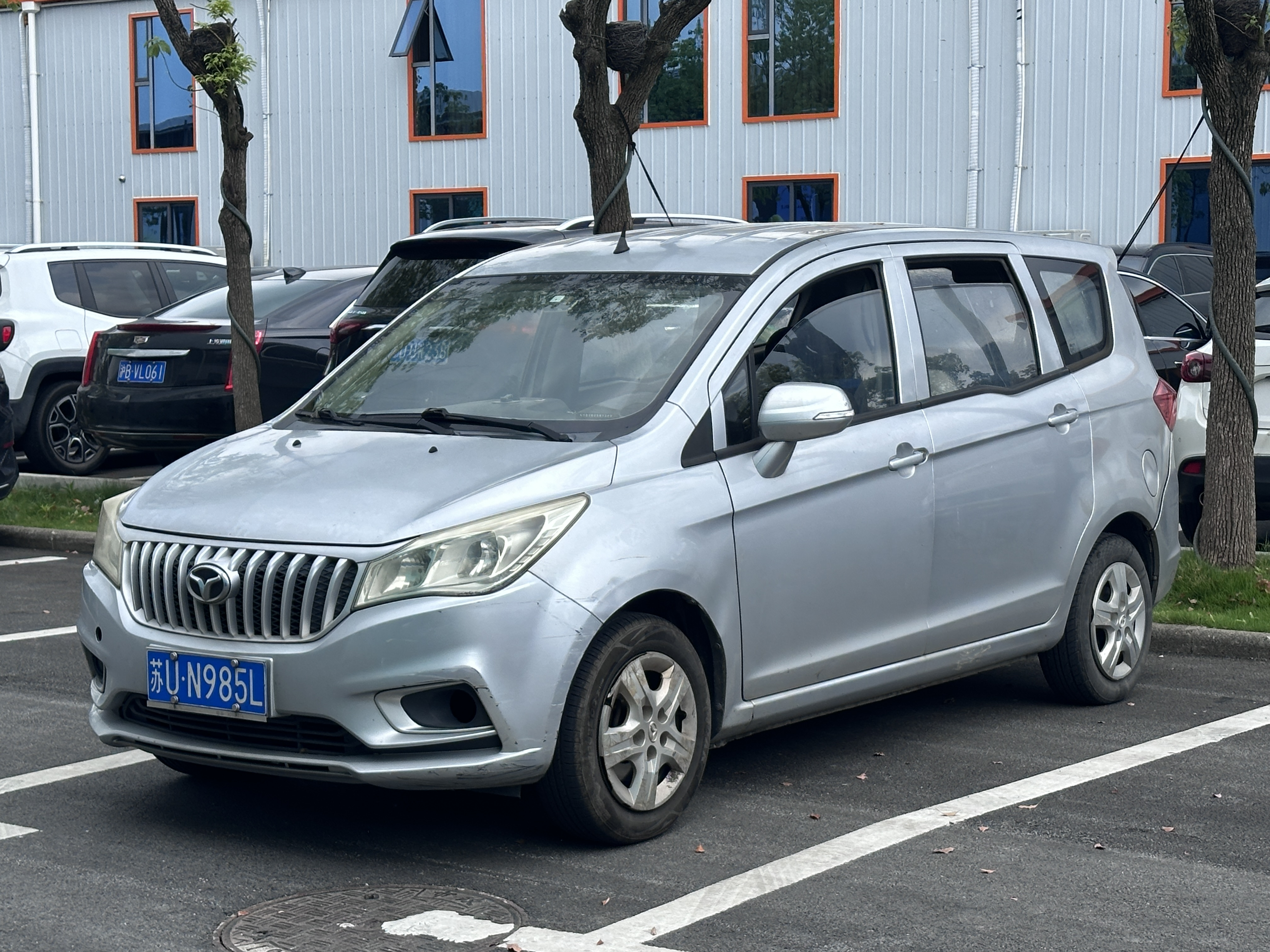
Enranger 727

Launched in 2019, the Enranger 727 is the lower trim of the Enranger 737. Built on exactly the same structure, the Enranger 727 was sold with less options and as a commercial minivan. The Enranger 727 was therefore cheaper with the price of the Enranger 737 starting from 46,800 yuan and ending at 49,800 yuan. The powertrain of the 727 is a 1.5 liter producing 110 PS and 143 NM mated to a five-speed manual gearbox.

== Enranger G5 ==
The Enranger G5 concept or Yingzhi G5 concept debuted on the 2015 Chengdu Auto show in September 2015, and the production version was launched in China in late 2015. Despite being called the Enranger G5, the production version of the Enranger G5 has little in common with the Enranger G5 concept shown during the 2015 Chengdu Auto show, as it is essentially the crossover version of the Enranger 737 compact MPV. Price of the Enranger G5 starts from 59,800 yuan and ends at 85,800 yuan.
