= Pennsylvania Railroad class G3 =

Class of American 4-6-0 Type steam locomotives

PRR G3/G3a PRR Class X
Type and origin
- Power type: Steam
- Builder: Fort Wayne shop
- Build date: 1892-1893
- Total produced: 23
- Number rebuilt: 2 (G3a converted to G3)
Specifications
- Configuration
  - Whyte: 4-6-0
  - UIC: 2'C'
- Gauge: 4 ft 8 1/2 in (1,435 mm)
- Driver dia.: 68 in (1,727 mm) (G3); 62 in (1,575 mm)
- Fuel type: Coal
Career
- Operators: Pennsylvania Railroad
- Class: Class X G3/G3a
- Number in class: 23 (Class X); 21 (G3); 2 (G3a)

PRR G3 was a class of American Pennsylvania Railroad (PRR) 4-6-0 Ten Wheeler Type steam locomotive class built by the Pennsylvania Railroad with a total of 23 locomotives built in 1892-1893 to pull passenger trains and freight trains but as time went by larger and more powerful steam locomotives like the PRR Class K4 4-6-2 Pacific Type steam locomotives of 1914 took over fast passenger trains between 1914 and 1928 as well as the PRR Class G5 4-6-0 Ten Wheeler Type steam locomotives of 1923 also took over passenger trains between 1923 and 1929 . All the Pennsylvania Railroad Class G3 4-6-0 Ten Wheeler Type steam locomotives were retired replaced by 1925-1930 and all 23 locomotives were scrapped by 1931.
