= Weichai (Chongqing) Automotive =

Chinese automobile manufacturer

Weichai (Chongqing) Automotive Co., Ltd.
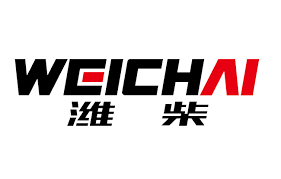
- Type: Co. Ltd.
- Industry: Automotive
- Founded: 2012
- Headquarters: Chongqing, People's Republic of China
- Area served: Mainland China
- Products: Automobiles

Weichai (Chongqing) Automotive (Chinese: 潍柴（重庆）汽车有限公司) is the subsidiary company wholly owned by Weichai Power Co., Ltd. since 2012.

== Overview ==
Weichai (Chongqing) Automotive was formerly named Chongqing Jialing Chuanjiang Automobile Manufacturing Co., Ltd, and was headquartered in Chongqing, China. It is a large automobile manufacturing enterprise, which is qualified to produce M1, M2, M3, N1, N2, N3 series vehicles.

== Enranger (marque) ==
In December 2013, Weichai Auto officially launched the Enranger brand for the Chinese car market. Enranger is the English name, with the Chinese name being Yingzhi (英致). Enranger is a brand that produces passenger vehicles including crossovers, MPVs, and pickup trucks. Production started in the second half of 2014 in an individual facility in Chongqing. Initial capacity was 100,000 cars per year which was planned to later be expanded to 300,000 annually. Enranger products include the following:

- Enranger 737 - compact MPV (codenamed M301)
- Enranger 737 EV - electric compact MPV
- Enranger 727 - compact MPV (lower trim level of the 737)
- Enranger G5 - compact crossover based on the 737
- Enranger G3 - subcompact crossover (code named S201)
- Enranger EX1 - mini crossover
- Enranger P80 - pickup truck
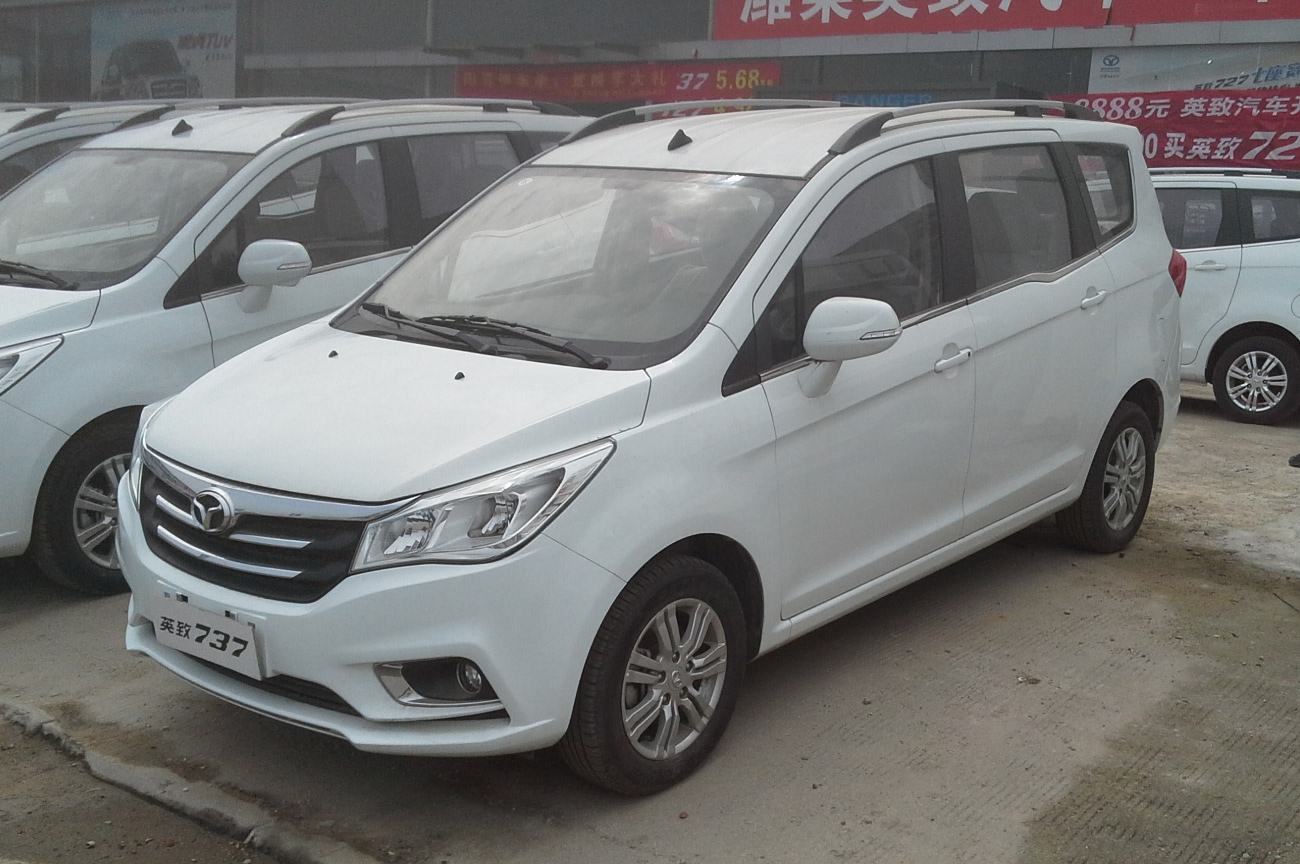
Enranger 737

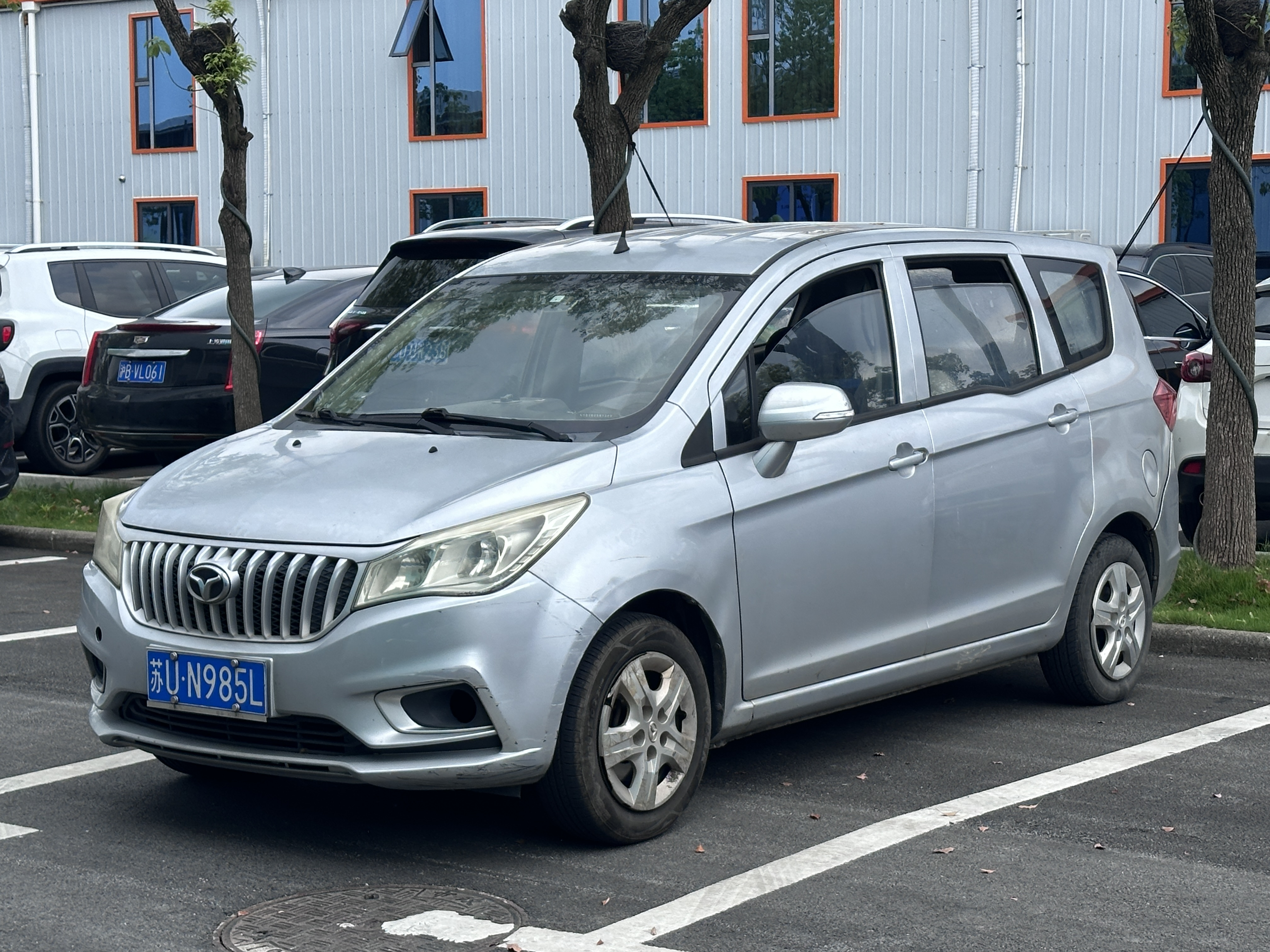
Enranger 727

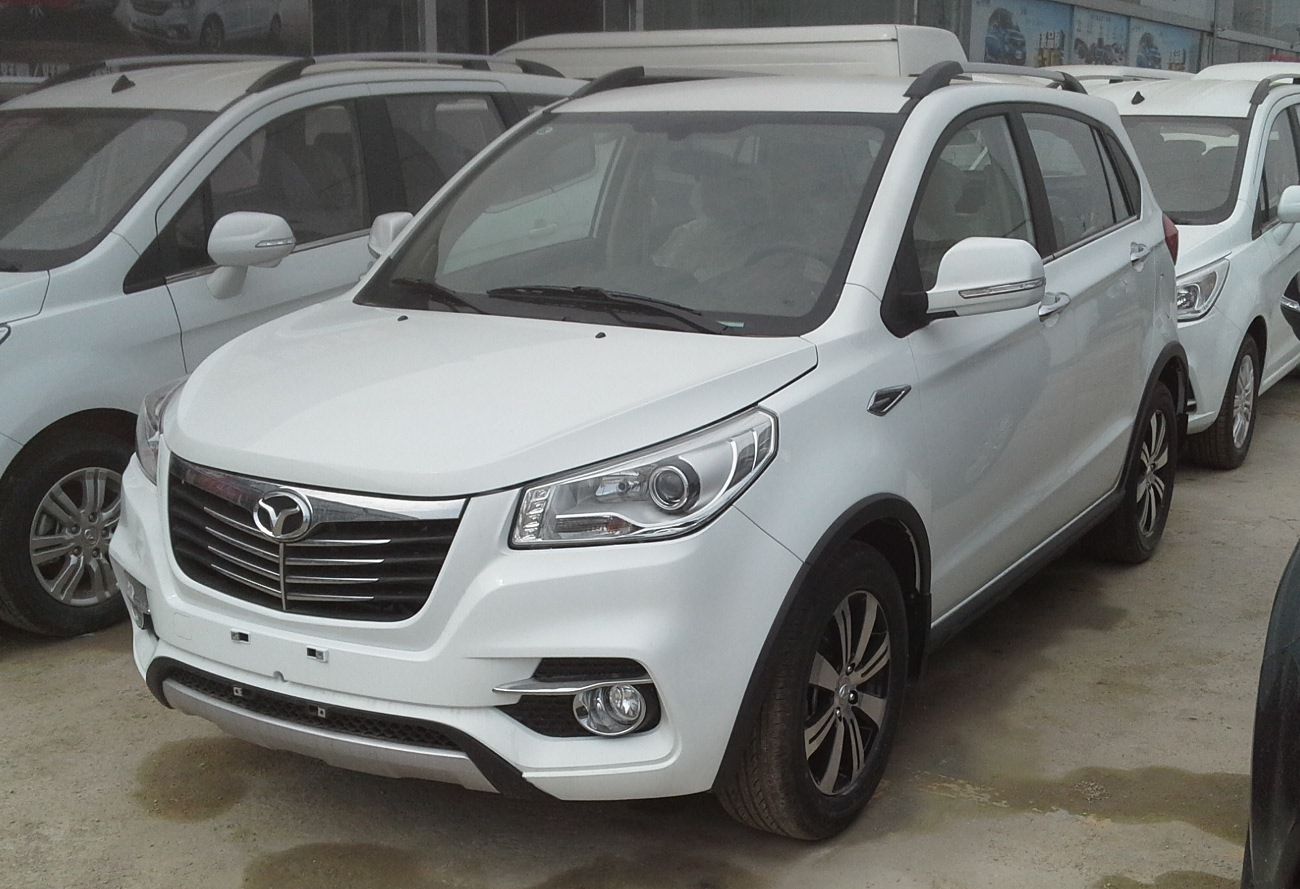
Enranger G3

== VGV (marque) and Sinotruk (marque) ==
On November 27, 2019, Weichai Motor released a new brand called VGV alongside the brand's first model, the Weichai U70. Different from the previous Enranger brand, the VGV uses the logo of China National Heavy Duty Truck Group and serves as the light passenger brand of the group. According to Chai Wei, deputy general manager of Weichai (Chongqing) Automobile Co., Ltd., The launch of Weichai VGV U70 will open the strategic layout of Weichai Group's light vehicles, which means that Weichai Group's competitive chips in the field of independent car brands will be raised again. The VGV U70 spawned several variants of the crossover SUV including an ute. As of 2026, VFV branded vehicles have been discontinued and products are now branded directly as Sinotruk, with the last update on the VGV brand being the VGV U70 Plus with its 2025 model year.

- VGV U70
- VGV U75 Plus
- VGV VX7
- VGV Pioneer V
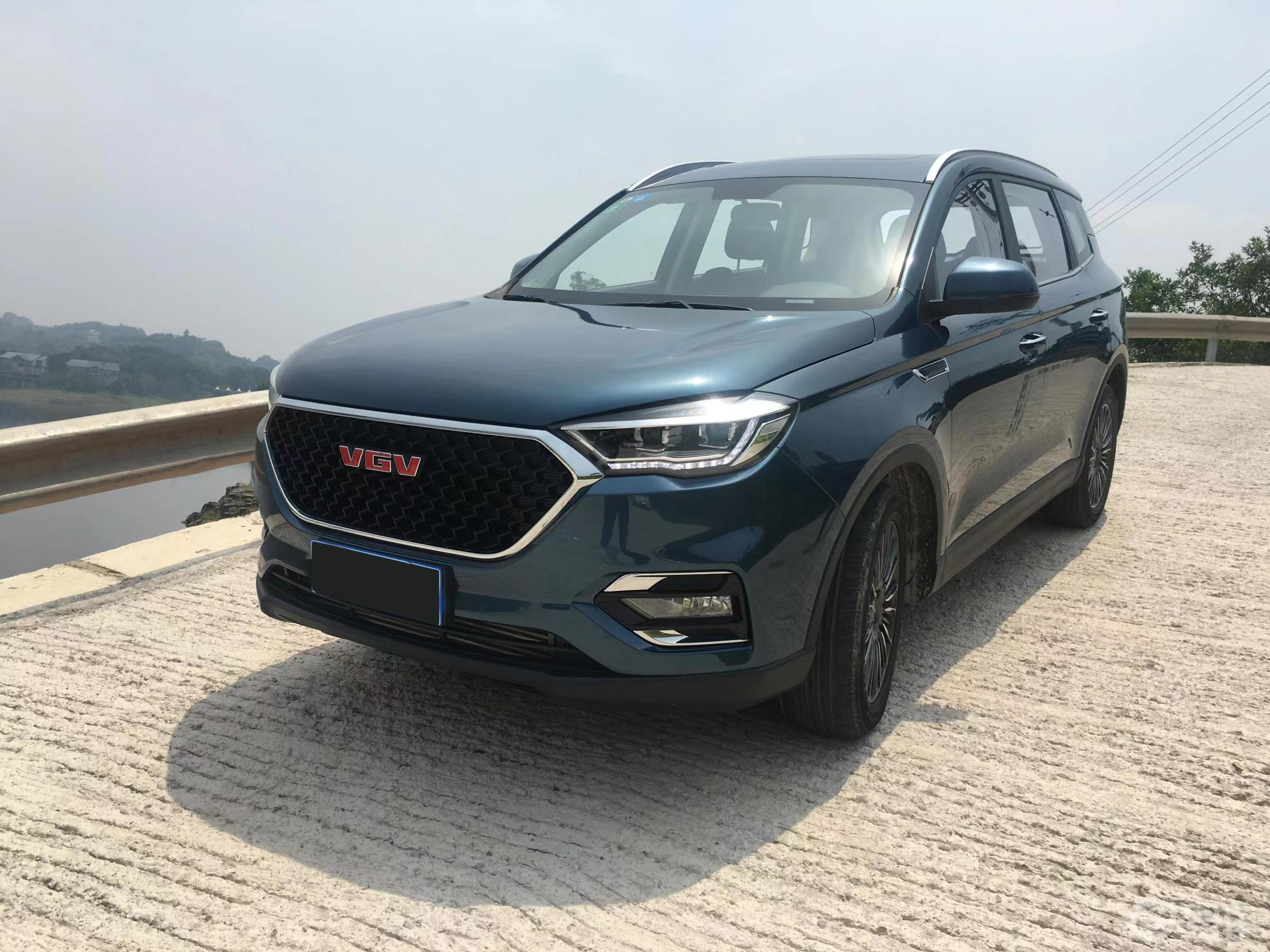
VGV U70

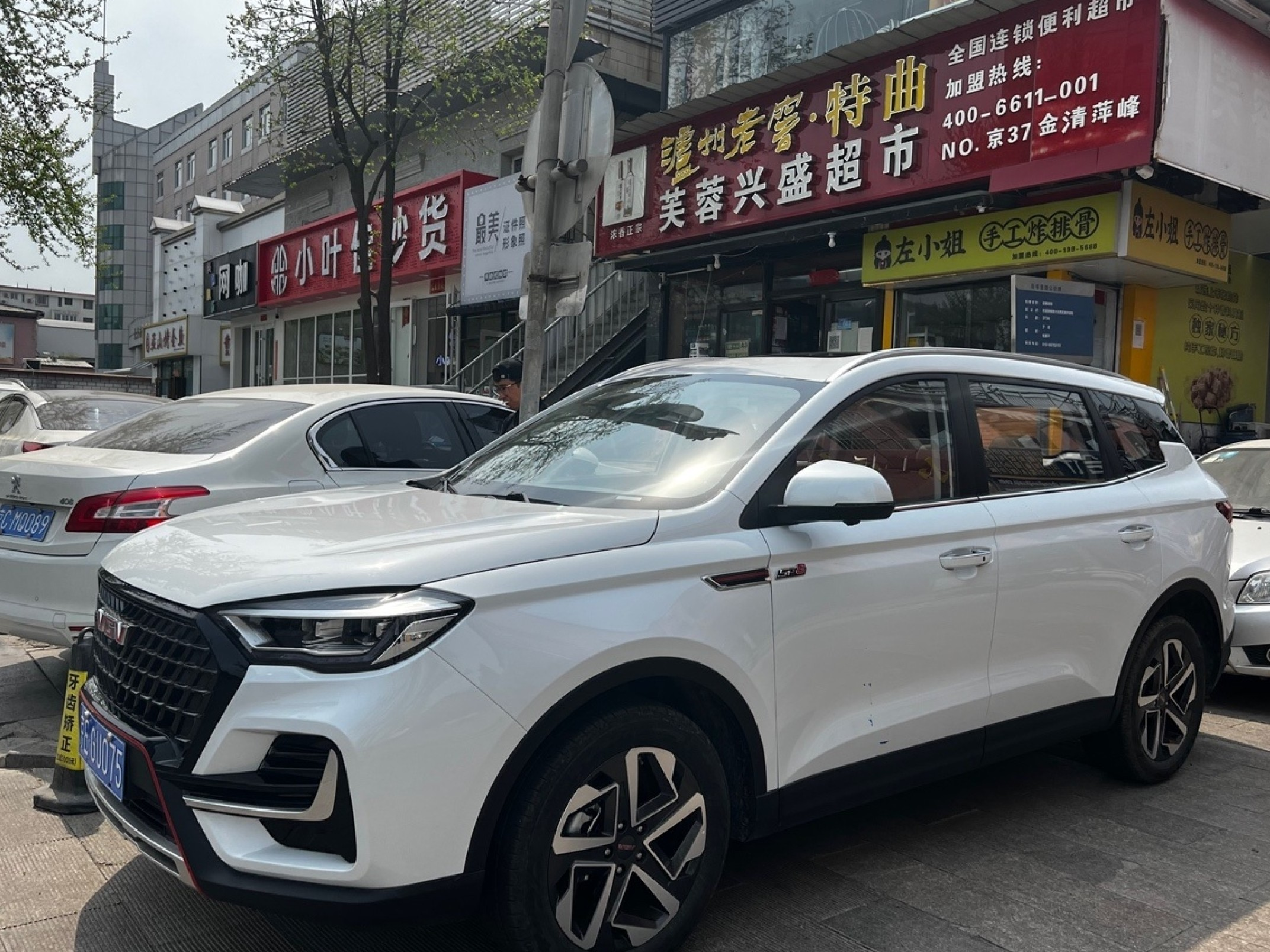
VGV U75 Plus

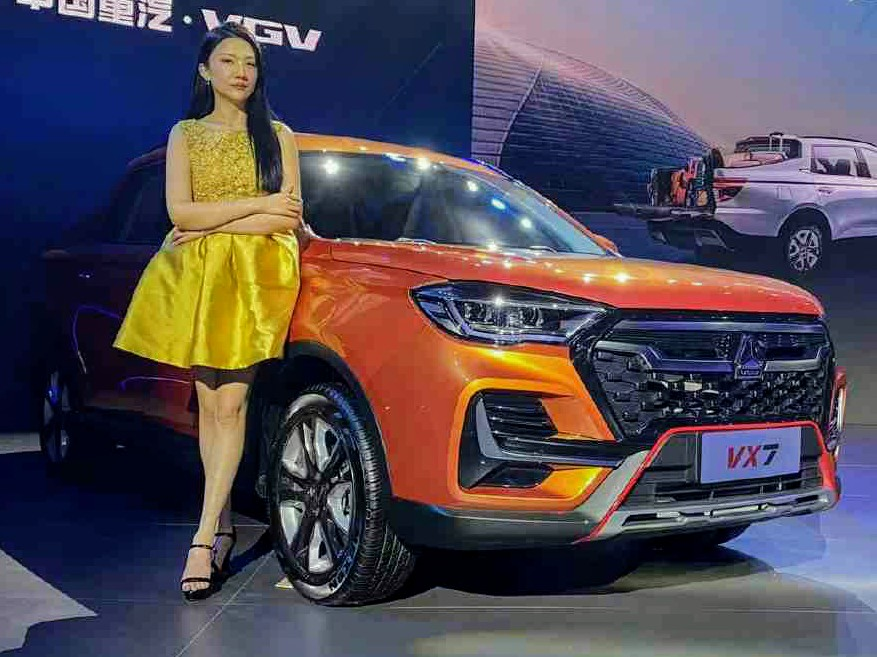
VGV VX7

As of 2026, Sinotruk vehicles being sold are listed below:

- Sinotruk Pioneer V/ Sinotruk Pioneer V EV
- Sinotruk Pioneer R
- Sinotruk Pioneer L
- Sinotruk Bolden (搏胜, Bosheng)
Sinotruk Pioneer V

Sinotruk Bolden
