= Sinotruk (Hong Kong) =

Hong Kong truck manufacturer company

Sinotruk (Hong Kong) Limited
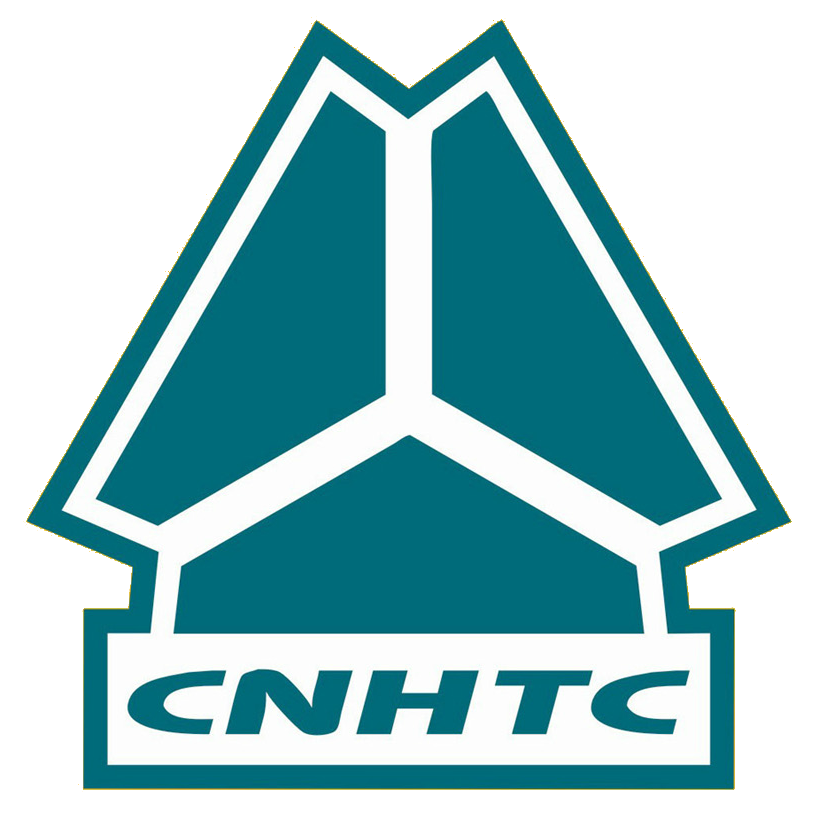
- Type: Public
- Traded as: SEHK: 3808
- ISIN: HK3808041546
- Industry: Manufacturing
- Founded: 31 January 2007; 19 years ago
- Founder: Sinotruk Group
- Headquarters: Hong Kong, China (registered office); Jinan, China (de facto)
- Area served: Worldwide
- Key people: Cai Dong (chairman and president)
- Products: Trucks
- Owner: Sinotruk Group (51%); Traton (25%)
- Parent: Sinotruk (BVI) Limited (direct); Sinotruk Group (intermediate); Chinese Central Government (ultimate)
- Subsidiaries: Sinotruk Jinan Truck (63.78%)

Chinese name
- Traditional Chinese: 中國重汽（香港）有限公司
- Simplified Chinese: 中国重汽（香港）有限公司
Transcriptions
Standard Mandarin
- Hanyu Pinyin: Zhōngguó zhòngqì (xiānggǎng) yǒuxiàn gōngsī
Yue: Cantonese
- Jyutping: zung1 gwok3 cung4 hei3 (hoeng1 gong2) jau5 haan6 gung1 si1

stock alias
- Traditional Chinese: 中國重汽
- Simplified Chinese: 中国重汽
Transcriptions
Standard Mandarin
- Hanyu Pinyin: Zhōngguó zhòngqì
Yue: Cantonese
- Jyutping: zung1 gwok3 cung4 hei3
- Website: www.sinotruk.com

Sinotruk (Hong Kong) Limited is a Hong Kong truck manufacturer incorporated in 2007. The subsidiaries of Sinotruk (Hong Kong) manufactures trucks in Mainland China. Its parent company, China National Heavy Duty Truck Group (a.k.a. Sinotruk Group or CNHTC), is a Chinese state-owned heavy truck manufacturer, headquartered in Jinan, Shandong Province.

== History ==
Sinotruk (Hong Kong) Limited was incorporated on 31 January 2007 in Hong Kong, a special administrative region of China, as an intermediate holding company for the Chinese Government owned China National Heavy Duty Truck Group (a.k.a., Sinotruk Group). Since 2 April, Sinotruk (Hong Kong) Limited owned the following subsidiaries: Sinotruk Jinan Truck, Sinotruk Jinan Commercial Truck, Sinotruk Jinan Power, Sinotruk Jinan Technical Center, Sinotruk Factory Design Institute, Sinotruk Shandong Import & Export Company, Sinotruk Jinan Ganghua Import & Export Company, Sinotruk Hong Kong International Investment Company and Sinotruk Finance. Sinotruk Jinan Truck itself, is a listed company in the Shenzhen Stock Exchange as SZSE:000951. The subsidiaries were acquired from Sinotruk (BVI) Limited and in turn acquired from Sinotruk Group.

Sinotruk (Hong Kong) Limited was listed in the Stock Exchange of Hong Kong on 28 November 2007. As of 2007, Sinotruk (Hong Kong) and its parent company Sinotruk Group, were jointly the largest heavy truck manufacturer in the Mainland China. At that time, 90% of the sale volume of Sinotruk Group, came from Sinotruk (Hong Kong) and Sinotruk (Hong Kong)'s subsidiaries. Sinotruk Group retained some of the assets unlisted.

Since 10 March 2008, Sinotruk (Hong Kong) became a constituent of Hang Seng China-Affiliated Corporations Index, a stock market index for red chip companies. The stock was removed from the index on 4 June 2012 and re-instated on 7 September 2020.

In September 2012, China National Heavy Duty Truck Group (Hong Kong) International Capital Limited purchased Units 1 to 5 on the 31st floor of the West Wing of Shun Tak Centre from investor Liao Weilin for HK$160,049,032, with an area of 9,188 square feet and a price of approximately HK$17,400 per square foot.

== Business ==
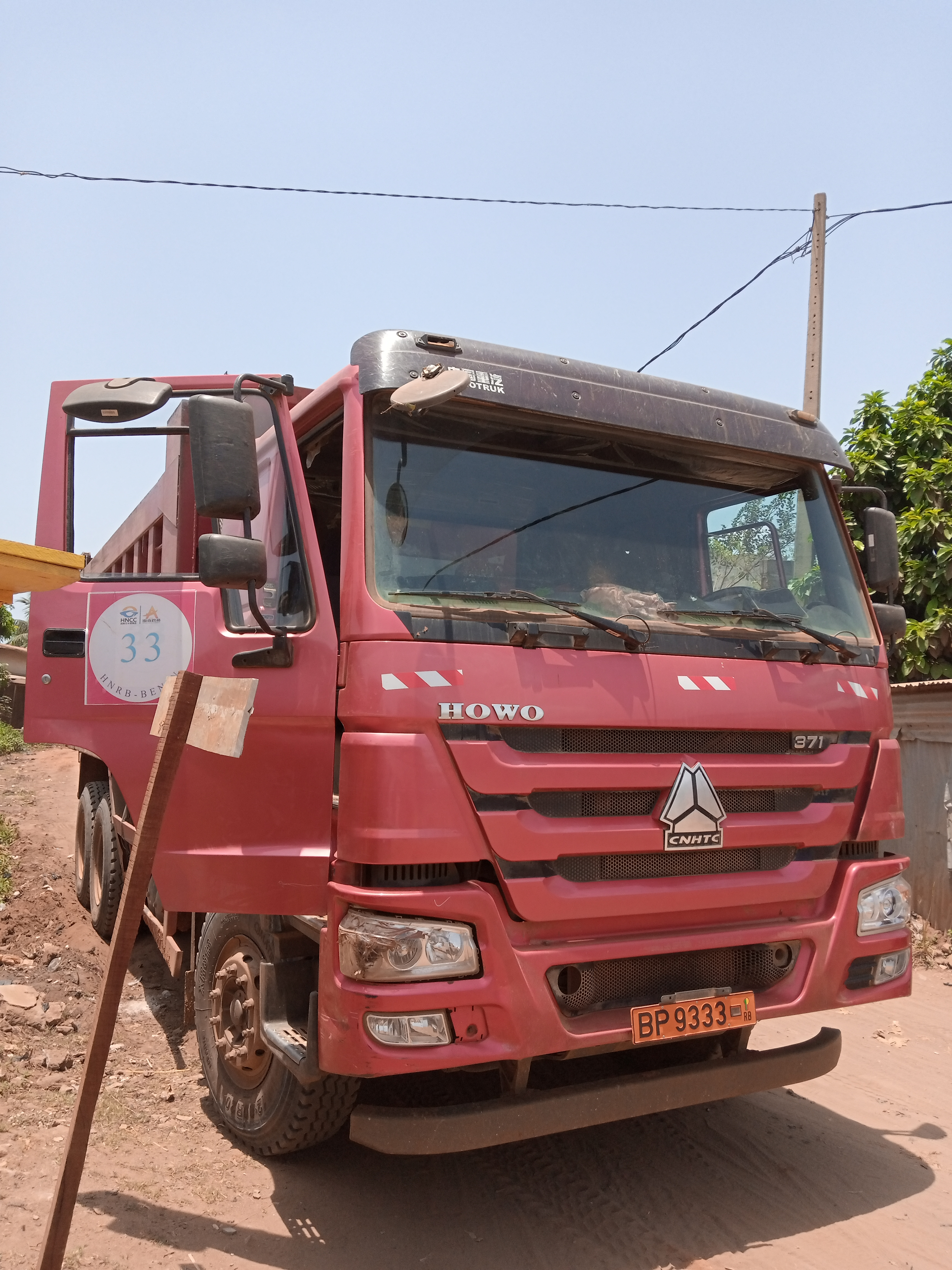
Howo truck in Benin (2020)

Sinotruk manufactures cargo trucks and semi-tractor trucks that are used in a range of industries including construction, container transportation, mining and steel production (Howo and Sitrak).

The company and its state-owned parent sold around 125,000 heavy-duty trucks in 2009 and accounted for about 20.1 percent of China's heavy-duty truck market. Sinotruk's overseas sales, mostly to developing markets such as countries of the former Soviet Union and Middle East states, accounted for about 19 percent (FY2007) both in terms of units sold and revenue.

Fuel-efficient trucks currently account for about 80 percent of the company's production.

== Controversies ==
From 2010 to 2014, Sinotruk exported civilian trucks to North Korea which were converted to military use. Sinotruk denied any wrongdoing in the transaction.

== Ownership ==
In 2009, the German truck maker MAN bought a 25% + 1 share stake in Sinotruk (Hong Kong).
