= John Howman =

English cricketer (1895–1958)

Personal information
- Full name: John Howland
- Born: 26 April 1895; Stow-on-the-Wold, Gloucestershire, England
- Died: 4 April 1958 (aged 62); Oxford, Oxfordshire, England
- Batting: Right-handed

Domestic team information
- Years: Team
- 1922–1923: Gloucestershire

Career statistics
| Competition | First-class |
|---|---|
| Matches | 13 |
| Runs scored | 128 |
| Batting average | 6.40 |
| 100s/50s | –/– |
| Top score | 23 |
| Balls bowled | – |
| Wickets | – |
| Bowling average | – |
| 5 wickets in innings | – |
| 10 wickets in match | – |
| Best bowling | – |
| Catches/stumpings | 5/– |
- Source: Cricinfo, 6 July 2012

John Howland (26 April 1895 – 4 April 1958) was an English cricketer. Howman was a right-handed batsman. He was born at Stow-on-the-Wold, Gloucestershire.

Howland made his first-class debut for Gloucestershire against Warwickshire at Edgbaston in the 1922 County Championship. He made twelve further first-class appearances for the county, the last of which came against Kent at the Nevill Ground, Tunbridge Wells, in the 1923 County Championship. In his sixteen first-class matches, he scored 128 runs at an average of 6.40, with a high score of 23.

He died at Oxford, Oxfordshire, on 4 April 1958.
