= China National Heavy Duty Truck Group =

Chinese truck manufacturing company

China National Heavy Duty Truck Group Co., Ltd. 中国重型汽车集团有限公司
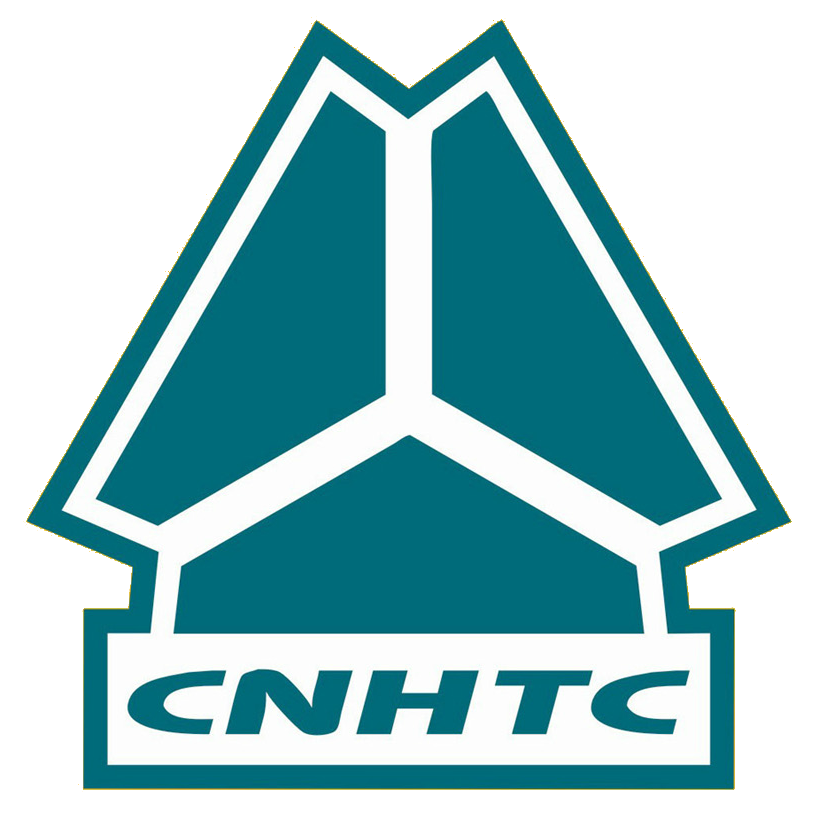
- Type: State-owned enterprise
- Industry: Truck manufacturing and sales
- Founded: 1935; 91 years ago
- Founder: Kuomintang government of the Republic of China
- Headquarters: Jinan, Shandong, China
- Area served: Worldwide
- Key people: Liu Zhengtao (Chairman); Liu Wei (President & Director)
- Products: Trucks
- Revenue: 110,049,530,000 renminbi (2018)
- Owner: Chinese Central Government
- Parent: The SASAC
- Divisions: Zongtong Bus, Luye, Keytrans, Wuyue, Sinotruck Huawin, Yunqaing, Sinotruck King, Howman, Huánghé,
- Subsidiaries: Sinotruk (Hong Kong) (51%)
- Website: www.cnhtc.com.cn

China National Heavy Duty Truck Group Co., Ltd., CNHTC or Sinotruk Group is a Chinese state-owned truck manufacturer headquartered in Jinan, Shandong province. It is currently the third largest truck manufacturer in Mainland China. It is known for developing and manufacturing China's first heavy duty truck - "Huanghe" (黄河, lit. Yellow River) JN150.

== History ==
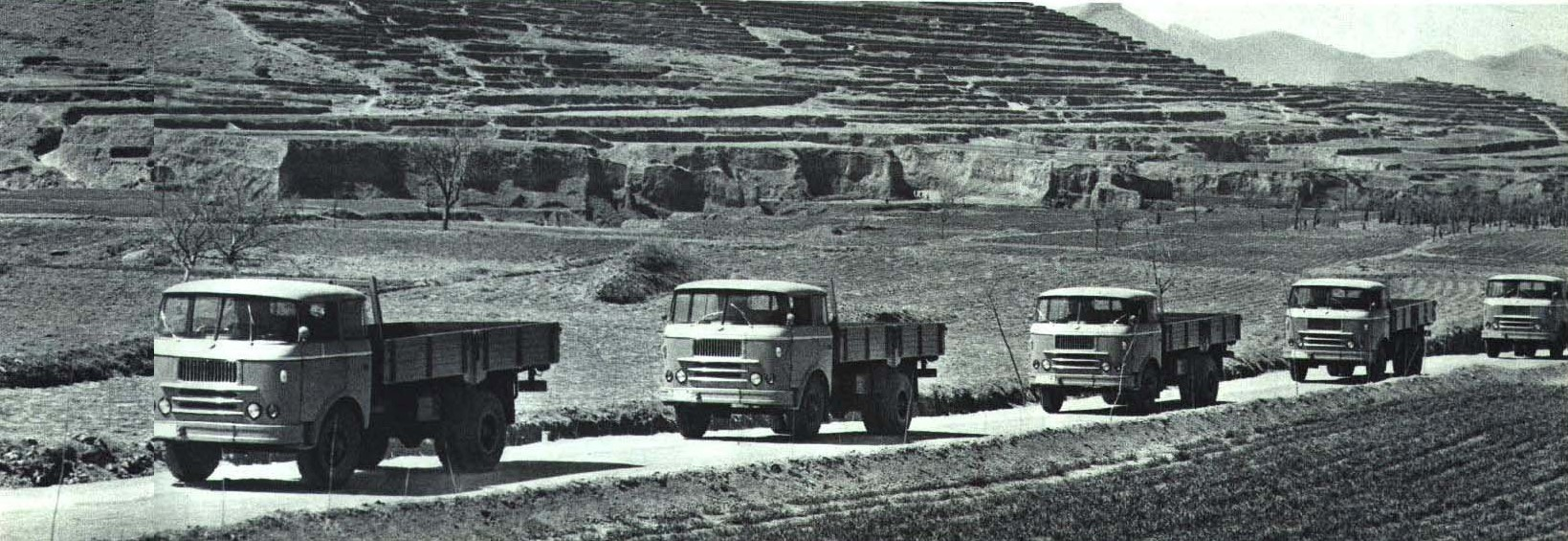
Huanghe JN150, the earliest model built by Jinan Automobile Works

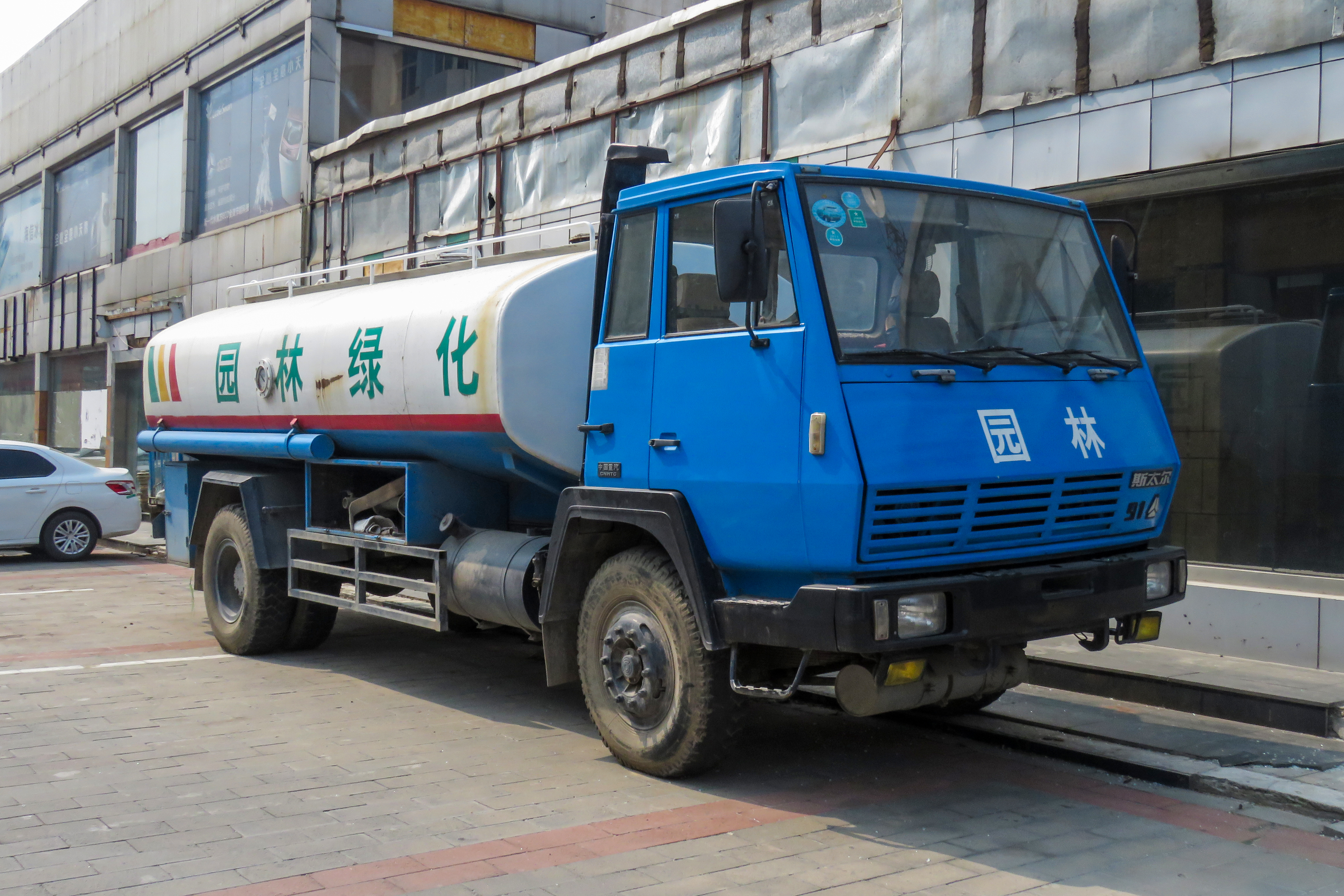
A Steyr 91 built by CNHTC

CNHTC was founded in 1935 by Kuomintang Government of the Republic of China era on the basis of Jinan Automobile Works. It started developing heavy-duty trucks in 1956, with its first truck modeled after Škoda 706 RT. In 1984, Jinan Automobile Works began to produce Steyr 91 with technology imported from Steyr-Daimler-Puch. Since the reform and restructure in 2001, the company has got rid of the operating losses for previous years.

Most of the group assets was now listed on the Stock Exchange of Hong Kong in 2007, as a Hong Kong-incorporated company, Sinotruk (Hong Kong). Another subsidiary (subsidiary of Sinotruk (Hong Kong)), Sinotruk Jinan Truck (SZSE:000951), was listed on the Shenzhen Stock Exchange.

After the collaboration with Steyr, Sinotruk had done collaboration with Volvo Trucks (which terminated around 2009), sold under the Howo nameplate, and later, collaboration with MAN AG, sold under Sitrak nameplate.

Some Howo model like Howo 7 series uses Volvo FL10 derived cabin, others like Howo A7 uses Volvo FH derived cabin. Sitrak models on the other hand, uses MAN TGA derived technology.

In October 2019, Shandong Heavy Industry became the controlling shareholder of "China National Heavy Duty Truck Group", acquiring a 45% stake.

== Group brands ==
- Howo
- Sitrak
- Huanghe
- Steyr

== Markets ==
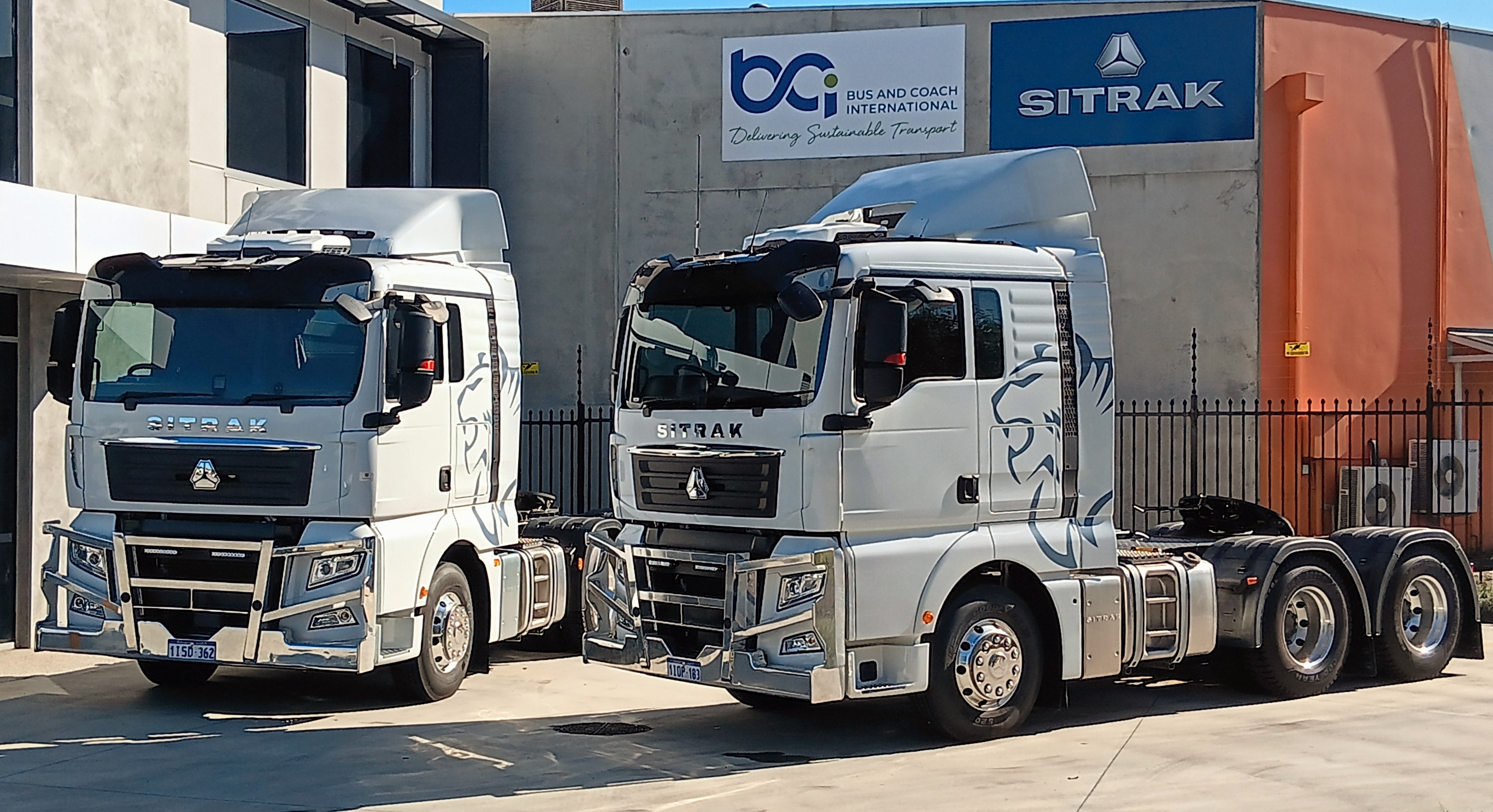
MAN TGX based C7H 6x4 Tractors at Sitrak dealership in Welshpool, Western Australia.

=== Australia ===
Sitrak entered the Australian market with the C9H tractor truck and a BEV, which is under testing but promises 600 kWh and a 450 km range. Both of the trucks were displayed at the 2025 Brisbane Truck Show. C9H was launched the same day with a 600hp Weichai diesel engine supported with a 12-speed ZF AMT gearbox and had EBS, ACC, AEBS, HSA and FCWS safety systems. The truck has a rated GCM of 110 tons, which qualifies it for heavy goods and road train operations.

=== Brazil ===
Sinotruk sells trucks in various South American countries. They came to Brazil in response to a group of businessmen with experience in the transportation industry. Sinotruk has sold 2,000 vehicles thus far. Sinotruk began building their first plant outside China in 2013 with an initial investment of more than 300 million dollars. Its location will be in Lages, Brazil.

=== India ===
Sinotruk entered India in 2014 with an order of 60 Howo dump trucks and in 2015 Sinotruk partnered with a Hyderabad-based company to set up an assembly plant in India; they planned to set up a plant in Maharashtra or Telangana. In 2018 Sinotruk launched HOWO Mine King, a 98-ton GVW 6x4 dump truck with a 12.4-liter diesel engine based on MAN producing 480 hp supported by an Allison 4600 ORS automatic transmission.

=== Pakistan ===
Sinotruk also produces trucks in Pakistan through a joint venture with Dysin Automobiles.

=== Philippines ===
They are also active in the Philippines as well since 2011 through dealership, selling light and heavy trucks.

== Heavy goods vehicle ==
- Dump truck
- Tractor tuck
- Cargo truck
- Military truck
- Special truck

== Light passenger vehicle ==
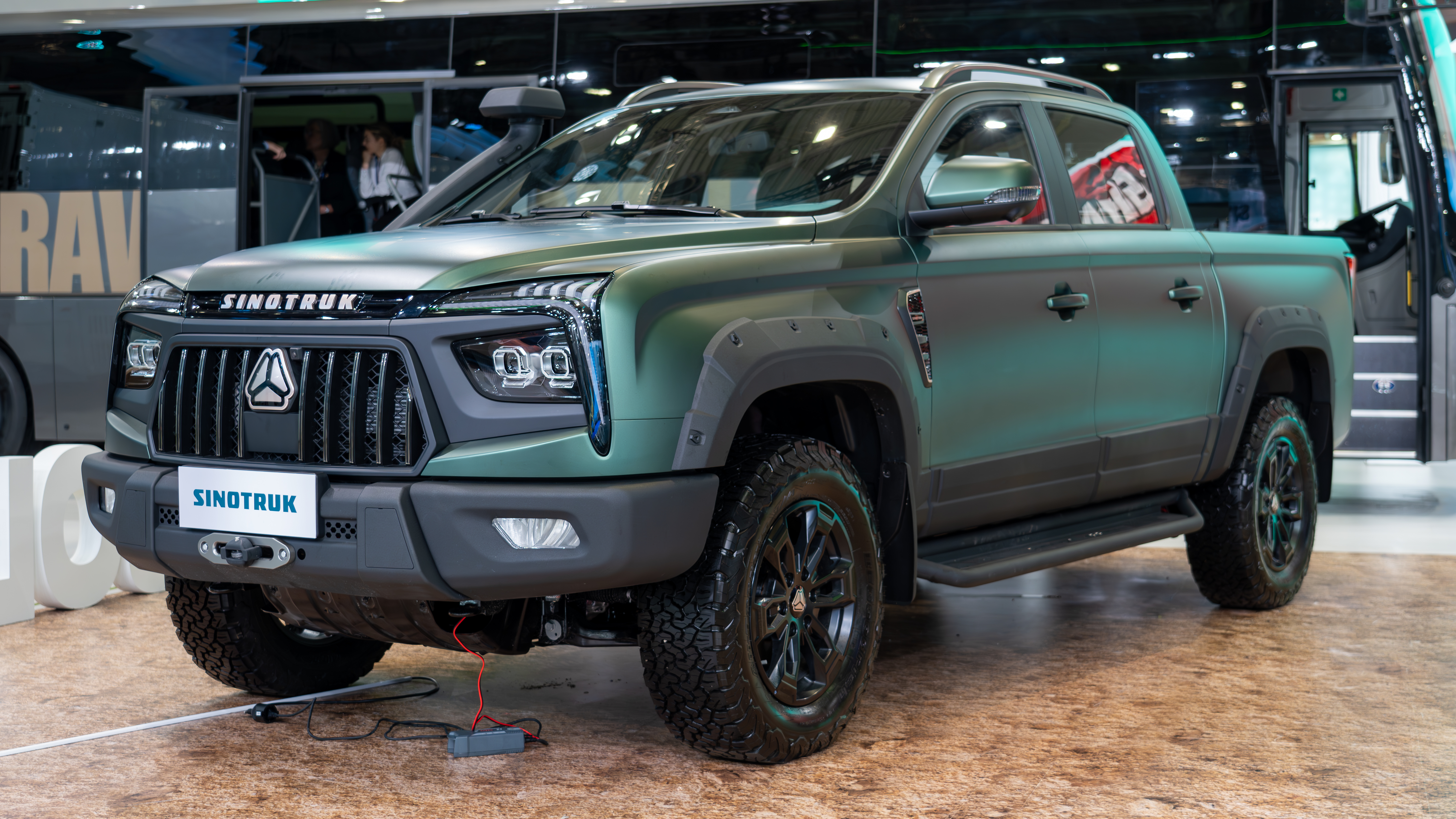
Sinotruk S9 pickup truck at International Motor Show Germany in 2024.

- Sinotruk Bolden – mid-size pickup truck
  - Howo S6 – commercial
  - Howo S7 – city
  - Howo S9 – offroad
  - Howo – electric
- Sinotruk Pioneer V - light commercial and passenger van

== Semi-Trailer ==
- Flatbed trailer
- Dump trailer
- Sidewall trailer
- Fuel tank trailer
- Lowbed trailer

== Electric Vehicles ==
- Terminal tractor
- Light goods Vehicle
- Dump truck
- Tractor truck
