= Raeda Dynamics =

Canadian bus manufacturer

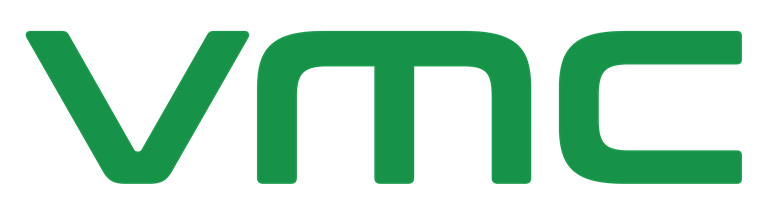
- Formerly: Grande West Transportation Corp. (2008–2021); Vicinity Motor Corp. (2021–2024)
- Industry: Manufacturing; Automotive
- Founded: 2008; 18 years ago (Grande Vicinity); September 9, 2024; 2 years ago
- Founder: William Trainer
- Headquarters: Saint-Jean-sur-Richelieu, Quebec, Canada
- Area served: Canada, United States
- Key people: William Trainer (CEO)
- Products: Heavy-duty transit buses
- Revenue: ▲US$13.49 million (2022)
- Website: raedadynamics.com

Raeda Dynamics, Inc. is a Canadian bus and truck manufacturer headquartered in Saint-Jean-sur-Richelieu, Quebec, Canada.

The company was founded in 2008 as Grande West Transportation Group, before renaming to Vicinity Motor Corp. in 2021. After declaring insolvency in November 2024, Vicinity's assets were acquired by Raeda Dynamics, which was founded two months prior.

== History ==
In 2008, BC Transit and Ottawa's OC Transpo issued a Requested for Proposal (RFP) for heavy-duty, mid-size buses from the major bus manufacturers. These companies either had no interest in producing such a bus or did not have capacity. As a result, Grande West was founded that same year, led by businessman William Trainer. The company built key partnerships with BC Transit and tailored their proposed bus designs to the agency's needs. Grande West worked closely with management and engineers with BC Transit to understand requirements and specifications of the Vicinity. The company initially targeted the niche demand for green, compact buses in the North American market with their 27.5 foot bus.

In October 2011, BC Transit placed an initial order for 15 Vicinity-model buses valued at $3.8 million. The first Vicinity buses were delivered on August 30, 2013. While the buses were designed by Grande West, they were manufactured in Yangzhou, China by Yaxing Motor Coach. Grande West went public with the initial public offering (IPO) at the end of 2013.

In 2015, Grande West entered a non-binding letter of intent (LOI) with Weichai Power to explore the possibilities of mutual bus development under the Weichai Group. The objective is to increase sales and distribution in North America. At the time of the LOI, Weichai Group was already part of the manufacturing process as they provided assemblies and the uni-body frame. Final assembly was located in Aldergrove.

In 2017, the Brooklyn Navy Yard bought six Vicinity buses for their shuttle service. In 2019, they bought two more to replace the older fleet of Freightliner cutaways.

Grande West Transportation Group consolidated its shares and changed its name to Vicinity Transportation Corp. on 29 March 2021, after receiving shareholder approval.

The Vicinity buses meet the Buy America requirements in the United States allowing the sales of buses to government public transit agencies. This allows Alliance Bus Group, the exclusive distributor for the US, to bid on all public transit projects in the United States. The deal with Alliance Bus Group was finalized in May 2015 with the first orders placed four months later for 50 30-foot buses. Along with the Buy America requirements, the Vicinity 30 foot model passed the Altoona Testing Program in Altoona, Pennsylvania. All new bus models used for mass transit revenue service and purchased with Federal Transit Administration (FTA) funds must complete an Altoona Test.

On July 7, 2021, Vicinity started construction of an assembly facility in Ferndale, Washington.

On July 29, 2021, the Morongo Basin Transit Authority selected Vicinity as the supplier for a large bus procurement agreement that could include up to 8,000 vehicles under the California Association for Coordinated Transportation partnership.

On October 21, 2024, Vicinity Motor Corp. was placed in receivership on application by the Royal Bank of Canada. and the company was declared insolvent by November. However, the company's assets, as of 2025, were reorganized as Raeda Dynamics.

== Vehicle models ==
Model	Photo	Length	Width	Introduced	Engine
Vicinity Classic		27.5 feet (8.4 m); 30 feet (9.1 m); 35 feet (11 m)	98.4 inches (2.50 m)	2008	Diesel
Vicinity Classic		27.5 feet (8.4 m); 30 feet (9.1 m); 35 feet (11 m)	98.4 inches (2.50 m)	2008	CNG
Vicinity Lightning EV		28 feet (8.5 m)	96.5 inches (2.45 m)	-	Electric
VMC 1200		27.5 feet (8.4 m); 30 feet (9.1 m); 35 feet (11 m)	98.4 inches (2.50 m)	2023	Electric
