= Shandong Heavy Industry =

Chinese state-owned manufacturing company

Shandong Heavy Industry Group Co., Ltd.
- Company type: Provincial-owned enterprise
- Industry: Automotive; Heavy equipment
- Founded: 2009 (Jinan)
- Headquarters: Jinan, Shandong, China
- Area served: Worldwide
- Key people: Tan Xuguang (Chairman and Chief Executive Officer)
- Products: Automotive components Construction equipment Diesel engines
- Revenue: US$15.46 billion
- Subsidiaries: Weichai Holding Group; Ferretti Group; Shantui Construction Machinery; Shantui Machinery; Weichai Heavy-Duty Machinery; Weichai Power; Yaxing Coach

Shandong Heavy Industry Group Co., Ltd. is a Chinese provincial-owned multinational heavy machinery and automotive manufacturing company headquartered in Jinan, Shandong.

Shandong Heavy Industry has four listed companies: Weichai Power (2338HK/000338SZ), Weichai Heavy-Duty Machinery (000880SZ), Yaxing Bus (600213SH) and Shantui Machinery (000680SZ).

== History ==
Shandong Heavy Industry was founded in 2009 through a merger between Weichai Holding Group, Shandong Construction Machinery Group and Shandong Auto Industrial Group.

In August 2012, Shandong Heavy Industry agreed to acquire 75% of the Italian yacht maker Ferretti Group for €178 million, plus the provision of €116 million of new credit facilities.

In August 2012, Shandong Heavy Industry's Weichai Power subsidiary agreed to acquire a 25% stake in the German forklift maker KION Group for €467 million, and a 70% majority stake in Kion's hydraulics business for €271 million.

In October 2019, Shandong Heavy Industry became the controlling shareholder of China National Heavy Duty Truck Group, acquiring a 45% stake.

== Operations ==
Shandong Heavy Industry has five principal operating subsidiaries: Weichai Holding Group Co., Ltd. (the parent company of Weichai Power), Shantui Construction Machinery Co., Ltd., Shantui Machinery Co., Ltd., Shanzhong Construction Machinery Co., Ltd., and Shandong Auto Industry Group Co., Ltd., Shazhonng Construction Machinery.
