= Linde Hydraulics =

German manufacturing company

- Company type: GmbH & Co. KG
- Founded: Munich, Bavaria, Germany (February 15, 1904; 122 years ago)
- Founders: Dr. Hugo Güldner; Dr. Carl von Linde; Dr. Georg von Krauss
- Headquarters: Linde Hydraulics, Aschaffenburg, Bavaria, Germany
- Area served: Worldwide
- Key people: Dr. Matthias Schreiber (CEO); Michael Kessler (COO); Helmut Wagener (Chairman of Supervisory Board)
- Products: Pumps, Motors, CVT, Power Transmissions, Valves, Electronics
- Services: Repair, Remanufacturing, Sale of spare parts
- Owners: KION Group; Weichai Group
- Number of employees: 1,400 (2020)
- Website: www.linde-hydraulics.com

LHY Powertrain (formerly Linde Hydraulics) is a manufacturer of heavy duty drive systems consisting of hydraulics, power transmissions, and electronics. The company's product offerings include hydraulic pumps and motors, directional control valves, power transmissions as well as peripheral electronics and software. Its products are used in agricultural, construction, forestry, landscaping, marine, material handling, mining, municipal, oil & gas, and stationary segments, as well as mobile lifting platforms.

== History ==
Linde Hydraulics from 1904 to 2020.

1904	Dr. Hugo Güldner, Dr. Carl von Linde and Dr. Georg von Krauss founded the Güldner-Motoren-Gesellschaft mbH.
1933	First Production of small diesel motors.
1938	Production expanded via gas driven motors and generators, aero engines, plough machines and diesel motors to the manufacture of tractors. The first Güldner tow tractor model A20 went into series production.
1956	The first hydrostatically driven vehicle, the so-called Hydrocar, was produced in Aschaffenburg.
1958	Linde Hydraulics was established as a division of Linde Material Handling, a Linde AG business unit. Production of the first forklift truck with hydrostatic transmission began.
1984	Linde and Linde Hydraulics introduced the load sensing valve technology.
1994	Introduction of the 02 Series axial piston pumps and motors with a swash angle of 21°.
2006	Linde Hydraulics became part of KION Group as a business unit of Linde Material Handling.
2008	Celebration of the 50th anniversary.
2010	Linde Hydraulics entered into a strategic sales and service alliance with Eaton Corporation.
2012 / 2013	The Chinese corporation Weichai Power, one of the leading companies in the commercial vehicle and automotive space, acquired 70 percent of Linde Hydraulics and became majority shareholder. Linde Hydraulics was registered as an independent legal entity (Linde Hydraulics GmbH & Co. KG). KION Group remained a strategic investor in Linde Hydraulics with a share of 30 percent in the company.
2014	Linde Hydraulics and PMP Industries from Italy established a strategic alliance in the power transmission and fluid power segments for mobile equipment markets.
2015	Linde Hydraulics opens China production facility in Weifang, Shandong Province. The new plant will be operated by Linde Hydraulics (China) Co., Ltd, which was formed in a joint venture between Linde Hydraulics GmbH & Co. KG (51%) and Weichai Power Co., Ltd (49%).
2016	Linde Hydraulics opens its newly built main plant in Aschaffenburg.
2018	Linde Hydraulics Opens New Location in Rock Hill, SC.
2020	Construction of the new plant in Weifang, China was completed and the doors were opened. On an area of about 36,000 m^{2} an administration building as well as production halls of about 25,000 m^{2} were built.

== Segments ==
- Agricultural
- Construction
- Forestry
- Industrial
- Material Handling
- Mining
- Municipal
- Offshore
- Oil & Gas

== Products ==
=== Pumps (Axial Piston) ===
- Closed Circuit
- Open Circuit

=== Motors (Bent Axis and Axial Piston) ===
- Variable Displacement
- Self-Regulating
- Fixed Displacement

=== CVT ===
- Classic Hydrostat
- Hydrostatic Variator for Internal Transmission Mount
- Hydrostatic Variator for External Transmission Mount

=== Power Transmissions ===
- Swing Drives
- Track Drives
- Wheel Drives

=== Valves ===
- Directional Control Valves
- Valve blocks
- Valve modules

=== Electronics ===
- Electronic control units (ECU)
- Pilot control devices
- Sensors & Actuators
- Software

== Services ==
- Repair of hydraulic pumps and motors
- Remanufacturing of hydraulic units
- Sale of spare parts

== Locations ==
Linde Hydraulics has 4 production plants in Germany (2x Aschaffenburg, Kahl, and Ballenstedt) and a 5th factory in Weifang, China. The company has subsidiaries in Europe, United States, South America, and China as well as a global network of sales and service partners.
