= Ahoy Club =

Australian yacht charter and brokerage company

- Type: Private
- Industry: Yacht charter; Yacht brokerage
- Founded: 2018
- Founder: Ian Malouf; Ellie Malouf
- Headquarters: Sydney, Australia
- Area served: Worldwide
- Key people: Ellie Malouf (CEO); Ian Malouf (Founder)
- Services: Crewed yacht charters; Yacht sales & brokerage; Yacht management; Refit
- Owners: Malouf family
- Subsidiaries: Floatspace
- Website: ahoyclub.com

Ahoy Club is an Australian yacht charter and brokerage company founded in 2018 by entrepreneur Ian Malouf and his daughter, Ellie Malouf. The company operates a digital platform for booking and purchasing crewed yacht charters and offers brokerage, yacht management, and refit services. Headquartered in Sydney, Australia, Ahoy Club has additional offices in London, Monaco, Côte d’Azur, and Fort Lauderdale.

== History ==
Ahoy Club was founded in 2018 as a digital marketplace for superyacht charters. Early projects included the management and refit of large vessels. In 2022 the company oversaw the €35 million refurbishment of the 73-metre Lürssen Coral Ocean, which then entered its charter fleet.

The company has also expanded through partnerships and acquisitions. In 2023 it took a stake in Ray White Marine, a brokerage representing Ferretti Group and Sunreef brands in Australia and New Zealand. The following year it acquired Floatspace, an online booking service for day-boats and entry-level charters, to broaden its instant-booking capabilities.

Ahoy Club has also promoted its brand through public events. In 2025 the company offered its 54-metre yacht Mischief as a venue for private functions during the 2025 Australian Grand Prix weekend.

== Operations and Services ==
Ahoy Club offers online booking for crewed yacht charters, as well as brokerage, yacht management, and refit services.

== Notable Vessels ==
- Coral Ocean (73 m Lürssen). Offered for charter by Ahoy Club following a €35 million refit in 2022.
- Mischief (54 m Baglietto). Available for charters in Australia.

== See also ==
- Yacht charter
