= Weichai Group =

Chinese state-owned enterprise

Weichai Holding Group Co., Ltd.
- Type: State-owned enterprise
- Industry: Automotive, Heavy Equipment, Engines
- Founded: 1946
- Headquarters: Weifang, Shandong, China
- Area served: Worldwide
- Key people: Chairman: Tan Xuguang
- Products: Diesel engines Powertrains; Transmissions; Axles; Automobile components and spare parts Power generation Vehicles; Yachts; Hydraulics products
- Revenue: US$12.88 billion (2014)
- Net income: US$812 million (2014)
- Total assets: US$19.4 billion (2014)
- Number of employees: 64,817 employees (2014)
- Parent: Shandong Heavy Industry
- Subsidiaries: Subsidiary List: Weichai Power; Weichai Heavy Machinery Co., Ltd.; Société Internationale des Moteurs Baudouin; Ferretti SPA; KION Group AG; Linde Hydraulics Ltd.; Shaanxi Automobile Group Co., Ltd.; Shaanxi Fast Auto Drive Group Company; Shaanxi HANDE Axle Co., Ltd.; Yangzhou Asiastar Bus Co., Ltd.; Weichai (Chongqing) Automotive Co., Ltd.; Zhuzhou Torch Spark Plugs Co., Ltd.; Zhuzhou Gear Co., Ltd.
- Website: Weichai Holding Group Co., Ltd.

Weichai Holding Group Co., Ltd. (Chinese: 潍柴控股集团有限公司) is a Chinese state-owned enterprise specialized in the design, manufacturing and sale of diesel engines. The company operates on four different business sectors which are engines and vehicles, powertrains, luxury yacht and automotive parts. Headquartered in Weifang, Shandong Province, China, the Weichai Group is holding more than 80 subsidiaries set throughout China and overseas. The group offers products, services and technologies for commercial vehicles, construction machinery, marine power, agriculture machinery and power generation. Thanks to its subsidiaries, it also provides transporting equipment, buses, luxury yachts and hydraulics products. Having more than 35 offices and 245 authorized services stations through the world, Weichai products are sold in approximately 110 countries.

== Group History ==
=== From the origins to 2007 ===
Weichai, formerly known as Yucheng Ironworks, was founded in 1946 in Weihai, Shandong Province, China. Based on this company, the ministry of People's Armed Forces of Weihai established Jianguo Ironwork Cooperatives which was later renamed Coastal Ironworks. It mainly manufactured 79-type rifles and repaired steamboats. After two years, Coastal Ironworks moved to Weifang and started to manufacture 15 hp and 40 hp low-speed diesel engines. At the same time, the company was renamed Dahua Machinery Factory.

In 1953, the company successfully launched the 6108 series diesel engine and was renationalized into the fourth Mechanical Industry Bureau in the first Ministry of Machine-Building Industry. The same year, it was renamed Weifang Diesel Engine Works and started research, development and production of diesel engines.

Weifang Diesel Engine Works, 1953

From 1955, the Czech 6160 diesel engine was successfully trial-manufactured and became the dominant engine model for China's coastal fishing and inland shipping. Ten years later, Weichai was named one of the seventy "Daqing-Type" enterprises, a famous national denomination in terms of industrial production. In 1968, the 6200 marine diesel engine was developed and manufactured for light fishing vessels. In 1970, the National Defense Industry requested Weichai to develop and produce the 8V160 type tank engine. Weichai R&D team successfully developed an 800 hp tank engine and won, in 1978, the National Science Conference Prize. In 1984, the Austrian heavy-duty vehicle engine Steyr WD615 was introduced. WD615 passed the national-level project acceptance certification in 1989, establishing a new pattern of parallel development of both medium and high-speed diesel engines for the factory.

Faced to a serious situation in 1998, the new management team made "Three commitments" to lead the company to implement the "Three One-Thirds" Property Reforms through innovation which included labor, personnel, and compensation. Weichai got its activity fields more diversified in 2000. Indeed, China's Modern Power and Construction Engineering Coordination Seminar, held in Weifang, identified Weichai's WD615 engine as the new-generation product for construction machinery.

Weichai Power Co., Ltd. (潍柴动力股份有限公司) was incorporated in 2002. Two years later, the latter was listed on the Hong-Kong stock exchange, starting a new step of International capital development for the company. Weichai Power possesses a full industry chain of power systems (including engines, transmissions and axles), heavy vehicles, automobile electronics and parts. In 2005, Weichai launched the Euro III "Landking" series engines: WP10 and WP12, which are China's first Euro III diesel engines. In the same year, Weichai Power acquired Torch Automobile Group Co., Ltd. (湘火炬汽车集团股份有限公司), allowing Weichai to own, among others, heavy-duty trucks, transmissions, and axles.

In 2006, Weichai Power formed the "International Strategic Alliance" with companies in the industry such as Foton, BOSCH and AVL, in order to explore new approaches for product innovation. In 2007, Weichai Power was listed on the Shenzhen Stock Exchange, creating the first domestic case of an "H to A" innovative capital operation. At the same time, Weichai Heavy Machinery, formerly Shandong Juli, was re-listed on the Shenzhen Stock Exchange. The latter is covering large, medium and small whole series of marine power and power generation equipment.

=== Overseas mergers and acquisitions ===
In January 2009, Weichai's acquisitions started with Société Internationale des Moteurs Baudouin, a French company who designs and manufactures marine engines. Then, in July 2012, Weichai Group signed a strategic cooperation agreement with Ferretti Group, the luxury yachts Italian Group, in order to acquire 75% of its stake.

Ferretti, Press Conference, China, 2012

In September 2012, Weichai Power, also signed a strategic cooperation agreement with the KION Group, in order to acquire 25% of the KION Group's shares and 70% of the shares of KION's subsidiary, Linde Hydraulics.

=== Today ===
In 2013, Weichai Power became a global sponsor of the Ferrari F1 team under a 4-year-contract strategic alliance.

Launching of Weichai New logo, Ferrari, China, 2014

Since 2005, Weichai cooperates with several Chinese Universities: Shandong University, Tianjin University, Tongli University, Tsinghua University, Jilin University, and Zhejiang University with the goal of developing advanced technologies and applications into industrialization.

Currently, Weichai Group owns many brands in China and overseas. It has a total of six global operations centers located overseas: Wiesbaden in Germany, Forlì in Italy, Cassis in France, Chicago in the United States, Singapore, and Pune in India, which all run testing centers and Research and Development platforms.

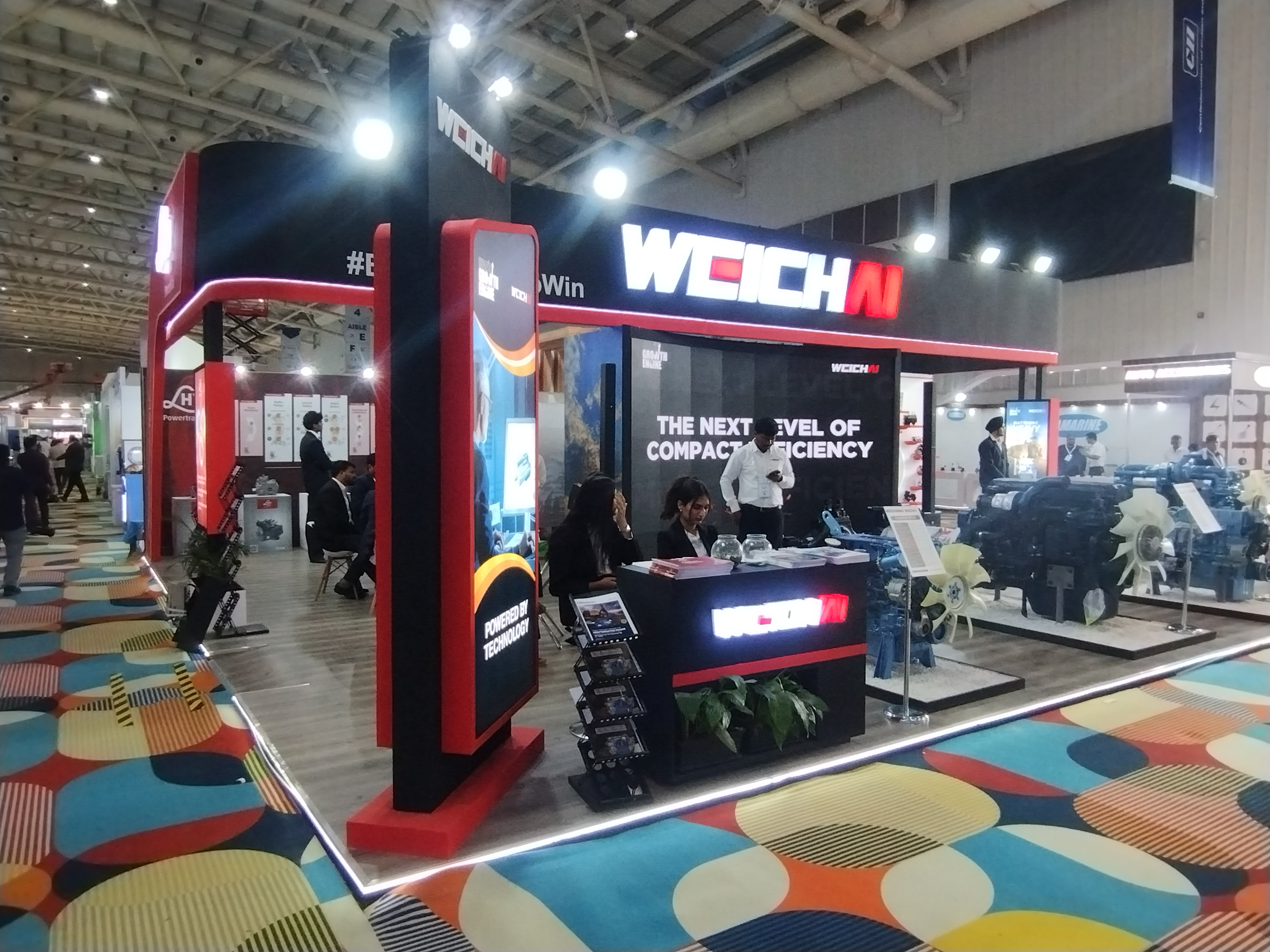
Weichai Group at EXCON 2025, BIEC

== Future ==
"Green Power, International Weichai" is the current mission of Weichai. The company focuses on controlling the entire industry chain to care about the environment and integrating all resources to play on the global scene. Moreover, the customers' satisfaction is a big part in the Weichai's development program. In more concrete terms, Weichai aims in the next several years to achieve a sales income of 200 billion of yuan and to be in the World Top 500 Enterprises.

== Weichai’s Brands ==
Weichai holds several well-known brands in China. In 2015, hereinafter is the list of Weichai's brands:

Weichai New Energy Commercial Vehicle Co., Ltd. (潍柴新能源商用车有限公司), originally founded on November 25, 2005 as Shandong Automobile Manufacturing Co., Ltd. (山东汽车制造有限公司). The company was fully integrated into the Weichai Holding Group in 2021. The company was renamed to Weichai New Energy Commercial Vehicle Co., Ltd. in August 2022, with Landking (蓝擎) brand introduced in 2023.

Weichai Power Co., Ltd. (HK2338, SZ000338), founded in 2002 and headquartered in Weifang, Shandong Province, China, its core activities are powertrain (engines, transmissions and axles), vehicle engines, hydraulic control and auto parts.

Shaanxi Heavy-duty Motor Co. Ltd., or SHACMAN (陕西重型汽车有限公司), founded in 1968 and headquartered in Xi'an, Shaanxi Province, China, it manufactures commercial vehicles, especially heavy duty-trucks.

Shaanxi Fast Auto Drive Group Company, or Fast (陕西法士特齿轮有限责任公司), founded in 1968 (formerly Shaanxi Auto Gear General Works), and headquartered in Xi'an, Shaanxi Province, China, mainly manufactures heavy-duty, auto transmissions, auto gears, forgings and castings.

Shaanxi HANDE Axle Co., Ltd.(陕西汉德车桥有限公司) was jointly invested and built up by Weichai Power Co., Ltd. and Shaanxi Automobile Group Co., Ltd. in 2003. Headquartered in Xi'an, Shaanxi Province, China, it is mainly manufacturing axles.

Shantui is a Chinese manufacturer of construction equipment, the main product of which is bulldozers. The company is known as Bulldozer king in China, manufacturer of 40% bulldozers in 2006.[2] the Company plans to become the largest bulldozer manufacturer, making them more than 10,000 units that year or 2 of the 5 tracked bulldozers in the world.

Yangzhou Asiastar Bus Co., Ltd. (亚星客车股份有限公司), founded in 1949, possesses two production bases located in Yangzhou and Xiamen, China. It is manufacturing many various types of coaches: intercity buses, school buses, high-end sightseeing buses, urban buses, private coaches, luxury caravans, special vehicles and other environment-friendly buses.

Weichai Power Yangzhou Diesel Engine Co., Ltd. (潍柴动力扬州柴油机有限责任公司) recombined with Weichai Power in 2009, is located in Yangte River Delta, China. It is manufacturing diesel engines mainly used in light trucks and light buses, low speed trucks, self-unloading trucks, croppers, etc.

Zhuzhou Gear Co., Ltd. (株洲齿轮有限责任公司), founded in 1958, headquartered in Hunan Province, China, is working on R&D, manufacturing and sales of drive axle gears, transmissions, transfer cases and reduction boxes.

Zhuzhou Torch Spark Plugs Co., Ltd. (株洲湘火炬火花塞有限责任公司), has been created in 1961, and is located in Zhuzhou, Hunan Province, China. Torch Spark Plugs brand can be used for automotive, motorcycles, small gasoline engines, special industrial spark plugs...

Weichai (Chongqing) Automotive Co., Ltd. (潍柴（重庆）汽车有限公司), is the subsidiary company wholly owned by Weichai Power Co., Ltd. since 2012, formerly named Chongqing Jialing Chuanjiang Automobile Manufacturing Co., Ltd, headquartered in Chongqing, China. It is a large automobile manufacturing enterprise, which is qualified to produce M1, M2, M3, N1, N2, N3 series vehicle.

Weichai Heavy Machinery Co., Ltd. (潍柴重机股份有限公司), has been restructured by Weichai Holding Group Co., Ltd in 2006. The company develops, manufactures and sells marine power and power generation equipments, medium-speed and high-speed diesel engines, generator sets and integrated power systems.

Société Internationale des Moteurs Baudouin headquartered in Cassis, France, created in 1918, is the power generation specialist for the marine and inland shipping industry. Weichai Power acquired Moteurs Baudouin in 2009.

Ferretti Group is an Italian multinational shipbuilding company, founded in 1968, which owns eight yacht brands. Weichai Group signed a strategic restructuration agreement with Ferretti Company in 2012 and obtained 75% of its shares.

Linde Hydraulics Ltd., founded in 1904, based in Aschaffenburg, Germany, is a global developer and supplier of modular drive systems consisting of hydraulics, electrical engineering and electronics. In 2012, Weichai Power agreed to acquire a 25% stake in KION Group and a 70% majority stake in KION's hydraulics business.

== Businesses ==
WP13 Series Engine for trucks from 358 to 445 kW (480 to 605hp)

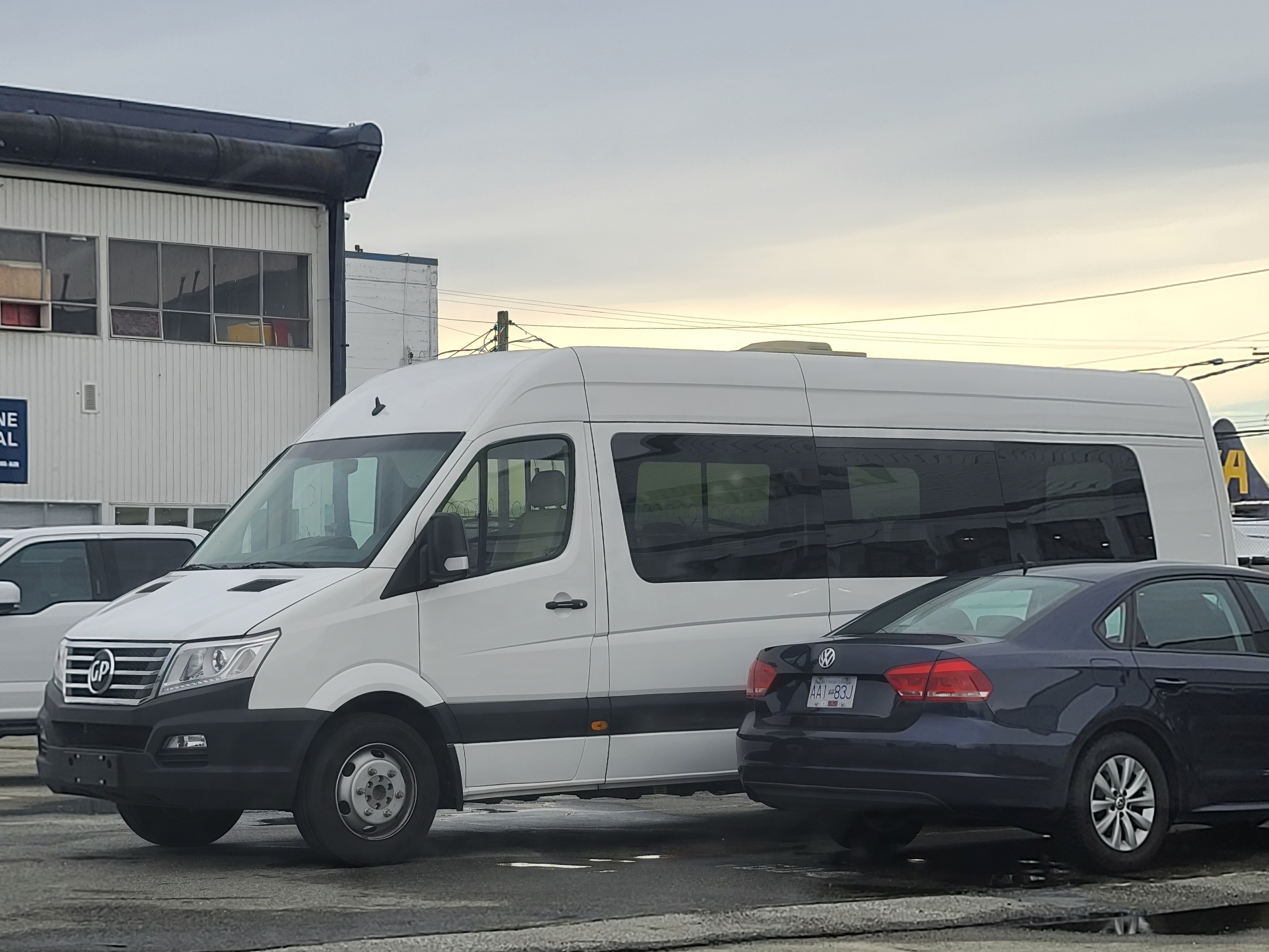
Asiastar Eurise electric van in British Columbia, Canada

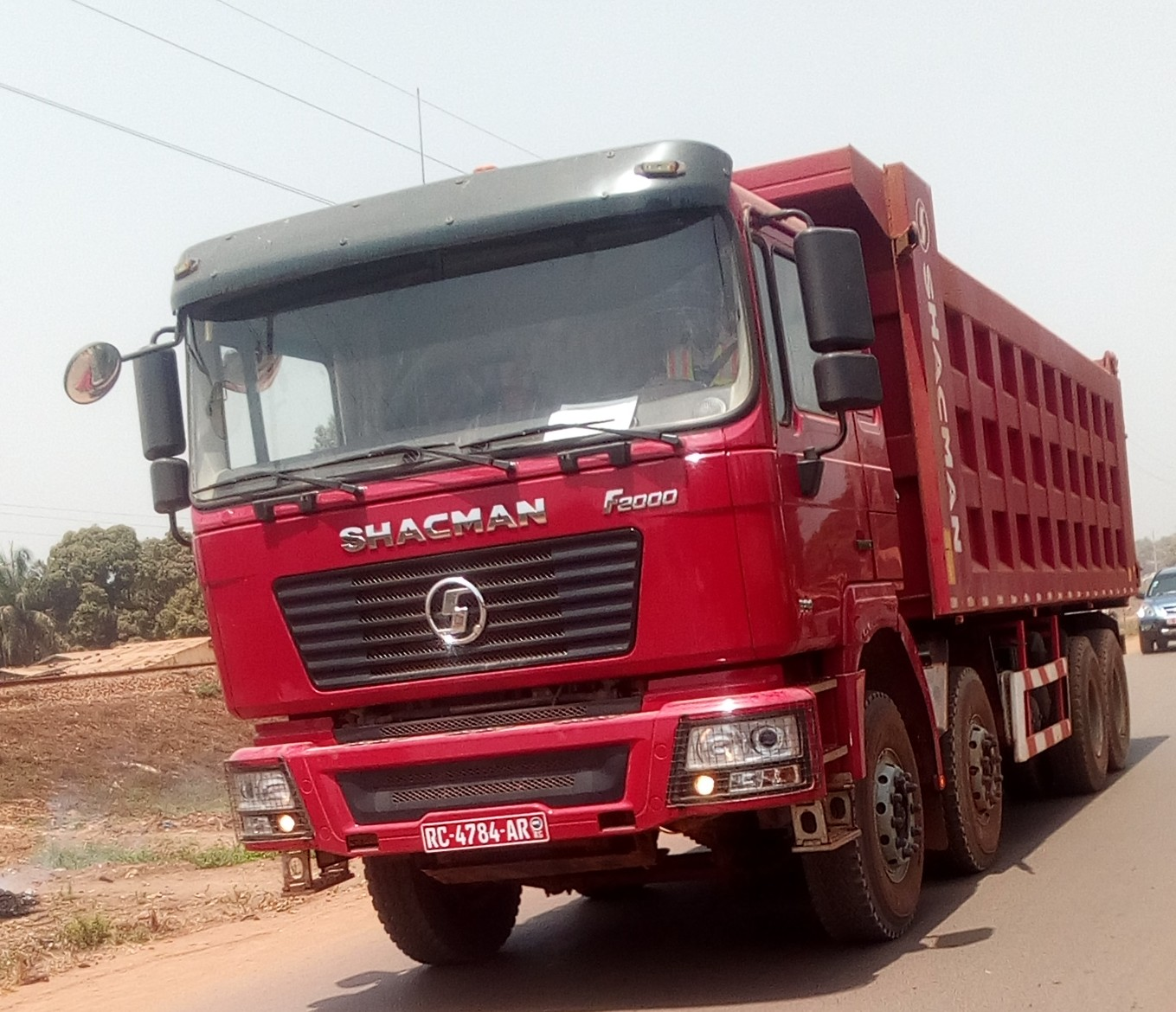
Shacman F2000 truck in Guinea

The company operates on four different business sectors:

Powertrain: Weichai focuses on engines but also on other parts as transmissions, axles, or generating sets for different applications: high-speed light-duty engines, high-speed medium-duty engines, high-speed heavy-duty engines, medium-speed diesel engines, low-speed diesel engines. The main targeted markets include trucks, buses, construction machinery, marine power, power generation, and agriculture machinery...

Vehicles and engines: Subsidiaries as Shacman, AsiaStar, or Shengda Special Vehicles provide Weichai with different vehicles market: Heavy duty automobile, coaches, special vehicles, and commercial vehicles.

Key components: Thanks to its subsidiaries, Linde Hydraulics, Torch Sparks Plugs, Zhuzhou Gear, etc., Weichai Power provides different auto parts including hydraulic parts, spark plugs, gears, piston pins, auto lamps...

Luxury Yachts: Founded in 1968, Italian Ferretti Group is a luxury yachts manufacturer, and owns the following yacht brands: Ferretti Yachts, Pershing, Itama, Riva, Mochi Craft, CRN, Custom Line. In order to build a Blue Economic Zone in the Shandong Peninsula, Weichai Group signed a strategic restructuration agreement with Ferretti Company in January 2012, and obtained 75% of the shares of New Ferretti Company for a price of 374 million Euros.

== Awards ==
Thanks to a rapid development, Weichai won several national prices:

- "National Quality Award", 2007
- "National Innovative Enterprise", 2009
- "National Demonstration Base of Enterprise Culture", 2011
- "Chinese Industry Award", 2011
- "National In-depth Integration Model of information technology and industrialization", 2012

== See also ==
- Shandong Heavy Industry
- Weichai Power
- Ferretti
- KION Group
- Shaanxi Automobile Group
