= David Alan Schwedel =

American investor (born 1965)

David A. Schwedel
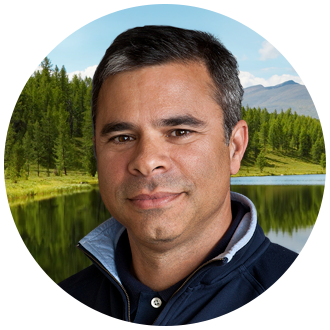
- David Alan Schwedel
- Born: June 21, 1965 (age 61); United States
- Other name: David Schwedel
- Occupation: SME Investor
- Known for: Financing multiple companies in the energy technology, manufacturing, and chemicals industries
- Website: corallum.com

David Alan Schwedel (born July 21, 1965) is an American SME investor known for financing businesses. Schwedel serves as an executive in multiple American companies in the manufacturing, petrochemical, energy and marine industry including Gables Energy Partners, CRG, Encina Development Group, Electrolytic Technologies, and Corallum. He is also the founder of Encina.

== Career ==
Schwedel made his first steps at 12 in the marine industry working in monthly maintenance and detailing. Afterwards, he worked with various boat manufacturers, including Intrepid, Cigarette, and Bertram over several years. Schwedel began his corporate finance career in 1986 at the OLMC group of companies, a Miami venture capital firm. During his tenure at this company, he served as senior vice president and member of their investment committee. In 2005, Schwedel founded DAS Family Holdings, L.P., a holding and investment limited partnership in industries including energy technology, and corporate finance. He served the State of Florida on the Technology Leadership Council. Schwedel is a member and advocate of several Florida charitable organizations including Miami Waterkeeper, and the Phillip and Patricia Frost Museum of Science.

Schwedel serves as an executive in multiple companies in North America, including:

- CEO and director of Gables Energy Partners, LLC, a North American energy and chemical technology company.
- Chairman of the board of directors, executive director, and lead investor for Encina Development Group LLC.
- Executive director of CRG, Ltd., an integrated coal technology company, specializing in coal technologies and waste coal recovery.
- Executive director of Electrolytic Technologies, LLC, a manufacturer of equipment related to chemicals for water and waste water treatment.
- Founder of Corallum, its principal, director, general partner and also a managing member, a diversified holding and investment enterprise.
- Founder of Florida Marine Management (MAREX) in 1992, a B2B platform for the marine industry. Since then, he serves as its chairman, C.E.O and president from 1992 to December 24, 2002.
- Since 2015, he served as chairman of the board of trustees for Miami Waterkeeper, which supports Biscayne Bay, its watershed, and wildlife. Along with his wife Maria Schwedel, he is the founder and inaugural Co-Chair of Miami Waterkeeper's Board of Trustees.
- Executive director and founder of Encina, a company that extracts BTX/P from waste plastics.
