= Dematic =

American supplier

- Industry: Material handling, Logistics automation, Software
- Headquarters: Atlanta, Georgia United States
- Area served: Worldwide
- Key people: Michael Larsson (President, KION Executive Board Member)
- Number of employees: more than 10,000 worldwide

Dematic is an American supplier of materials handling systems, software and services. With a growth rate of 21.2% in 2021 Dematic was listed as the world's second-largest materials handling systems supplier with a revenue of 3.2 billion USD. The company employs over 10,000 people and has engineering centres and manufacturing facilities in the United States, Germany, United Kingdom, Mexico, Australia, Belgium, China, Italy, Spain, France, Lithuania and Czech Republic. Its customer base includes small, medium and large companies in several other countries across six continents.

Since November 2016 Dematic has been a member of KION Group. Dematic's headquarters are located in Atlanta, Georgia.

== History ==
Dematic began in 1819 in Wetter, Germany with the founding of Mechanische Werkstätten Harkort & Co, which was incorporated into Deutsche Maschinenbau-Aktiengesellschaft (Demag) in 1910, then acquired by Mannesmann in 1973. After the acquisition of U.S. Rapistan (specialised in conveyor systems), Mannesmann Demag Fördertechnik AG was established in 1992. In 1993, Australian racking and shelving manufacturer Colby was added, and in 1997 the company was renamed to Mannesmann Dematic AG. Four years later, Siemens bought the company and merged it with its own logistics activities to form Siemens Dematic AG. In 2006 Siemens carved out the industrial and distribution logistics portion as Dematic GmbH & Co. KG. In the same year, the investment firm Triton acquired the majority of shares.

On December 28, 2012, AEA Investors LP ("AEA") and Teachers' Private Capital ("TPC"), the private investment division of the Ontario Teachers’ Pension Plan, completed their acquisition of Dematic from private equity firm Triton.

In February 2016, Dematic announced that it would be moving its manufacturing operations that had been done in Grand Rapids to a facility in Mexico.

In June 2016, KION Group agreed to buy Dematic for about $2.1 billion. In November 2016, KION Group completed the acquisition.

On March 13, 2017, Dematic announced the integration of Egemin Automation to create the world's leading provider of automated guided vehicle technology.

In January 2024, Michael Larsson was announced as President of Dematic after former President, Hasan Dandashly, retired.

In April 2024, Dematic expanded its operations in North Asia with a new office in Taoyuan City, Taiwan, to better serve industries such as retail, e-commerce, and logistics.

In December 2024, Dematic opened a new office in Riyadh, Saudi Arabia, to enhance service capabilities in the Middle East.

== Acquisitions ==
On September 15, 2010, Dematic Group successfully completed the acquisition of HK Systems, a North American automated material handling and software provider. The expanded manufacturing footprint allows Dematic to manufacture within the USA storage and retrieval machines and automated guided vehicles in addition to conveyor, sortation and order fulfillment technology.

In January 2015, Dematic acquired SDI Group Europe, a supplier of garment on hanger and flat sorter technology in Europe.

In November 2015, Dematic acquired Reddwerks Corp. pending approval of the shareholders. The acquisition became final in December 2015.

In March 2016, Dematic acquired NDC Automation, a provider of automated guided vehicles and software.

In March 2020, Dematic acquired Digital Applications International (DAI), a logistics software firm, for approximately $134 million.

== Business segments ==
Primary markets for Dematic systems include e-Commerce, grocery food and beverage, general retail, wholesale, manufacturing, apparel, parcel, pharma/healthcare, third-party logistics (3PL), and document management (integrated or automated library systems).

== Products and services ==
Dematic designs and manufactures individual products and material handling equipment such as automated storage and retrieval systems (AS/RS) and different types of conveyors, sortation systems and order picking systems. Dematic also offers consultative, planning, and design services. In addition, the company provides software like warehouse management systems and systems that support material flow and paperless order picking operations. Dematic also offers customer services such as the technical operation of facilities and their maintenance, including complete enterprise asset management.
