= Moteurs Baudouin =

French-Chinese motor manufacturer

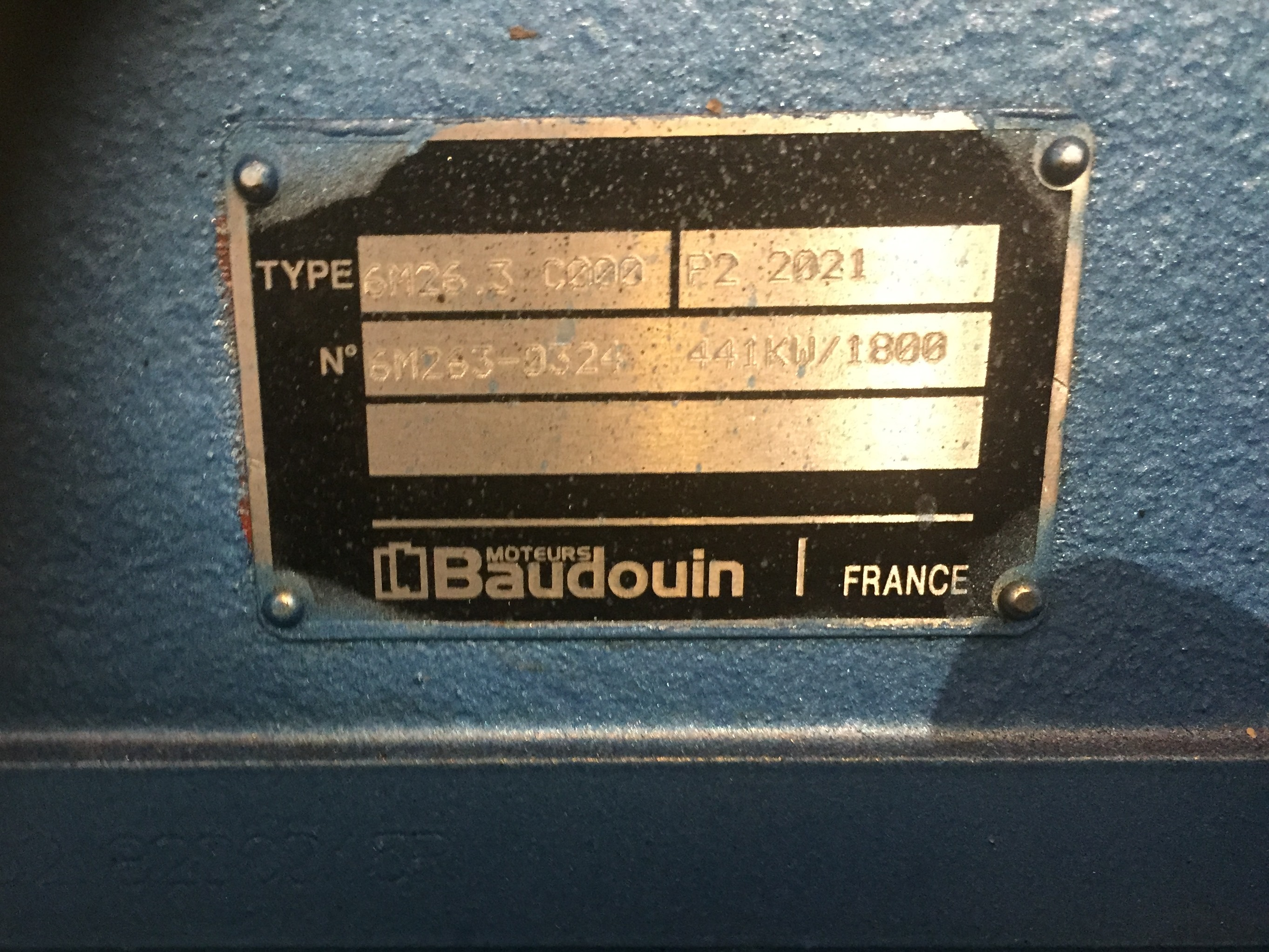
Baudouin marine propulsion diesel engine

Moteurs Baudouin was a French manufacturer of marine and industrial diesel and natural gas engines.

The company was founded in 1918 by Charles Baudouin in Marseille, France, and later moved its headquarters and manufacturing to Cassis. In April 2009, Chinese manufacturer Weichai Power acquired Baudouin for $3.8 million, and has since consolidated its European operations under the Baudouin name.

For most of its history, Baudouin built exclusively low-speed diesel engines, primarily for use in fishing vessels, but following the Weichai acquisition it began to develop high-speed engines for use in a wider range of marine power applications. In 2017, Baudouin introduced a range of stationary engines for power generation applications. In 2020, the company began production of its first LNG-powered engines, initially for stationary use, and started development of a new diesel/LNG marine engine design.
