= Shantui =

Chinese construction equipment manufacturer

Shantui Construction Machinery Co., Ltd.
- Traded as: SZSE: 000680
- Industry: Heavy machinery
- Founded: 1980
- Headquarters: Jining City, Shandong Province, China
- Products: Construction equipment
- Revenue: US$2.3 billion (2011)
- Parent: Shandong Heavy Industry
- Website: en.shantui.com

Shantui Construction Machinery Co., Ltd. is a Chinese construction equipment manufacturer, and a subsidiary of Shandong Heavy Industry. The core product line is bulldozers but in past years the company has expanded beyond reliance on a single product through an acquisition strategy.

== Bulldozers ==
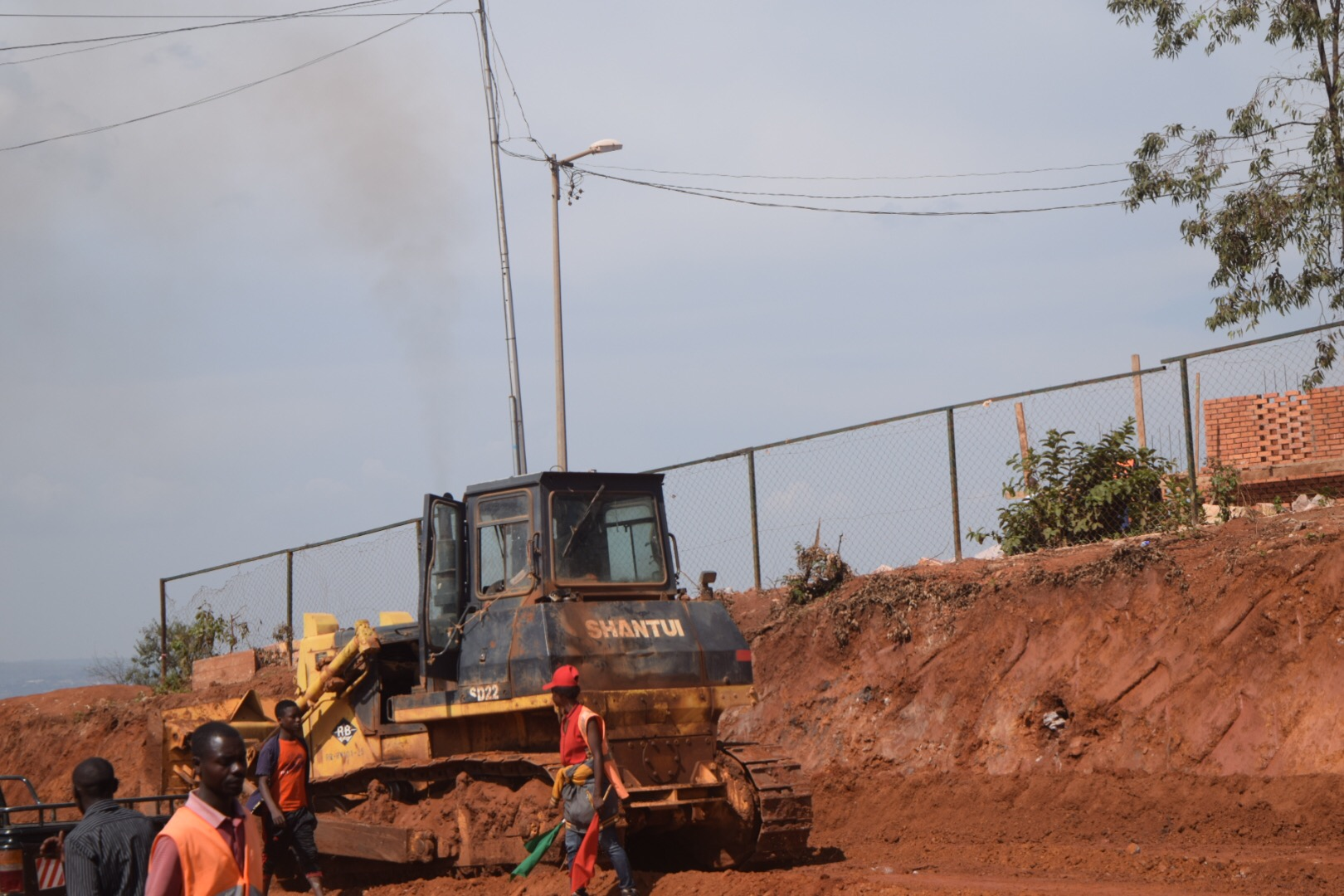
Shantui bulldozer in Rwanda.

The company is known as the largest producer of bulldozers in China, holding 40% of the domestic market in 2006. The company went on in 2010 to become the largest producer of bulldozers, making over 10,000 units that year or 2 in 5 crawler-type dozers made in the world. The next largest producer by number of units is Caterpillar Inc. as of 2012.

Shantui has increasingly developed bigger dozers, capable of competing against the large products made by Caterpillar Inc. and Komatsu. The upgrades to the Shantui dozer line was identified by The New York Times as one of the primary concerns for Caterpillar's business in Russia.
