= Sean Ewing =

Irish entrepreneur

Sean Patrick Ewing
- Born: 1968 or 1969
- Occupation: Irish entrepreneur

Sean Patrick Ewing (age 51) is an Irish entrepreneur involved in the fund management and yachting industries. He established FundsDirect in 1999 and co-founded Absolute Capital Management in 2004. In 2009 he acquired a majority stake in Pinmar, the world's largest yacht painting company, from the Ferretti Group. His wealth has been estimated at €95m and he has featured on the Irish Independent's Irish Rich List since 2010.

== Early life and career ==
Ewing, a native of County Donegal, was born in Sligo in 1965 and attended Summerhill College. On leaving school, Ewing worked for his uncle's small engineering business in Letterkenny while studying accountancy at the University of Ulster. He was invited to run the investment arm of an Irish building society, developing its tax planning, financial planning and portfolio management services. This led to an opportunity to partner with Hichens, Harrison & Co, the oldest firm of stockbrokers in the City of London, to acquire IPS Capital Management, the Bristol-based fund management business.

== Fund Management ==
IPS Capital Management was reversed into Farlake, a property company listed on London Stock Exchange's AIM market. Following the reversal, Farlake was repositioned as an asset management company which grew to $1bn assets under management before being sold to Talisman Group in 2000.

Ewing carved out from that sale the fund trading business which he had launched in 1999, called FundsDirect, the UK's first online fund supermarket. The platform allowed banks to trade around 36,000 funds across 13 European countries. In 2003 FundsDirect was sold to Egg and The Prudential for €32m.

In 2004, Ewing co-founded Absolute Capital Management and listed 30% of the company on AIM in 2005. The company won several accolades including European Hedge Fund of the Year in 2006. Ewing retired from Absolute Capital in July 2007 to spend more time with his wife and two young daughters. In September 2007 the company's co-founder Florian Homm resigned and the share price collapsed.

In 2016 the US Department of Justice entered a Settlement with Ewing as part of its investigation into Florian Homm, the Chief Investment Officer of Absolute Capital. The settlement acknowledged that Ewing had not undertaken any criminal wrongdoing nor had any knowledge of the alleged stock manipulation scheme that Homm had masterminded and for which Homm was indicted and charged by the US authorities. In July 2017, all charges against Ewing relating to the Homm case were dismissed with prejudice.

== Yachting ==
In 2009, Ewing entered the luxury yacht industry by acquiring the Ferretti Group's 60% stake in Pinmar, the world's largest yacht painting company, and investing in YCO, a yacht chartering company. In September 2012 Ewing launched an online platform for yacht charters called CharterBid.com. Ewing served as Chairman of Pinmar until its merger in September 2015 with Rolling Stock to form a new company, Global Yachting Group, (GYG).

== Sport ==
Ewing was an avid golfer in his youth, participating in the Irish Amateur and British Amateur. He also played rugby for his County and captained the County team in Gaelic football. Ewing remains a strong amateur golfer, winning the Abu Dhabi Yas Links Senior Open in 2015 and the inaugural United Arab Emirates Golf Amateur Tour in the low handicap category in 2017.
