= Custom Line =

The Custom Line logo

Custom Line is a brand of the Italian yacht manufacturer, Ferretti. The company’s yachts are produced in Fano, Ancona and Cattolica, while the office Headquarters are situated in Forlì.

== History ==
Custom Line evolved as part of a Ferretti project designed to broaden the company’s range of 30 meter boats. The boat’s design was assigned to Studio Zuccon International Project, which had been working with the Ferretti group for some years.

Custom Line was founded in 1996 to create a range of yachts in composite materials individually designed and built for highly demanding clients. Custom Line has continued to offer large internal areas for onboard livability and privacy with tailor-made interiors. Having been part of the Ferretti Group since 1996, Custom Line has created more than 20 projects in its 25 years as a shipbuilder.

== The Yachts ==
The Anti Rolling Gyro (ARG) system, patented by Mitsubishi Heavy Industries, was tested for the first time on a Custom Line yacht, the Navetta 30. The exclusive rights for this system, which reduces wave-induced rolling by 50%, have been granted to the Ferretti group until 2011.

Custom Line produces two planing yachts, the Custom Line 97' and the Custom Line 112' Next (which evolved from the Custom Line 112'), and two semi-displacement crafts, the Navetta 26 and the Navetta 33.

=== Custom Line 94’ ===
The first project yacht born by Custom Line was the 28.80-metre motor yacht Custom Line 94’ presented in Cannes in 1998.

=== Custom Line 97' ===
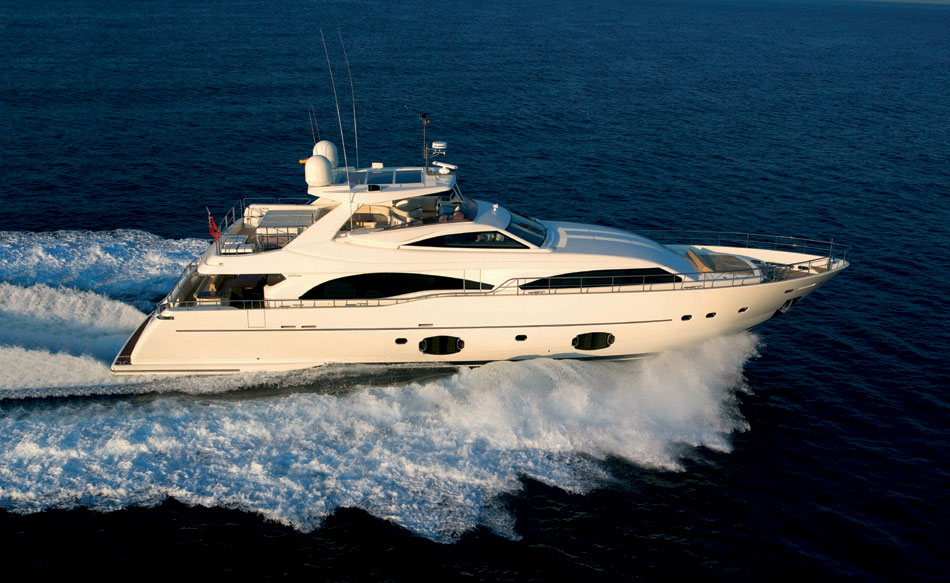
The Custom Line 97'

This maxi yacht, which is built at the Fano site, is produced by Ferretti AYT in conjunction with Zuccon International Project. The Custom Line 97’ is a planing yacht built from composite material; 29.70 meters long (roughly 97 feet, hence the name) and 7.08 meters wide, this yacht can carry up to 20 people including crew and has two different versions with either 4 or 5 passenger cabins (not including crew accommodation).

The Custom Line 97’ is powered by 2 MTU 16V 2000 M93 motors with 2400 hp at 2450 revs per minute which enable it to reach a top speed of 27 knots (50 km/h).

The Custom Line 97' made its first appearance at the Genoa International Boat Show in 2006.

The Custom Line 97' was certified by RINA to RINA 100-A-1.1 "Y" standards.

=== Custom Line Navetta 26 ===
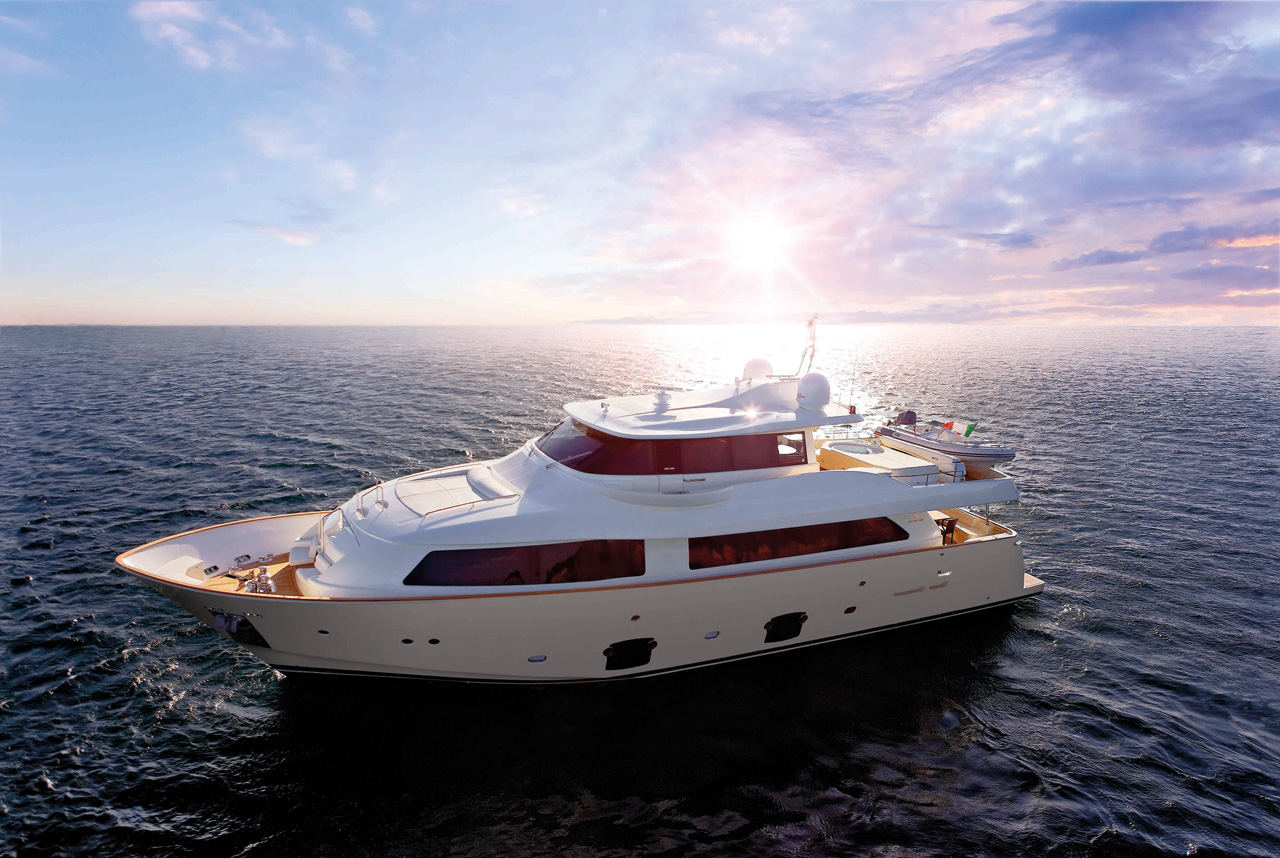
The Custom Line Navetta 26

Approximately 26 meters long, this semi-displacement yacht is built in composite material and can carry up to 20 people; the Navetta 26 has two alternative internal layouts with either 4 or 5 passenger cabins (crew accommodation excluded). The boat also has two different motor capacities with either 900 or 1100 hp, offering a top speed of 14 and 16 knots (30 km/h) respectively.

The Navetta 26, which was designed by the Zuccon International Project and Ferretti AYT, was first presented at Cannes in September 2007.

The Navetta 26 was awarded the 2008 MYDA (Millennium Yacht Design Award) in the class for motor boats over 24 meters, an award presented by Seatec (the International Exhibition for technology, subcontracting and design for boats, yachts and ships, which is held annually at the Carrara Boat fair) «for the designs and designers of pleasure craft of particular interest as regards innovation, external layout, internal architecture, and innovation in building technologies».

The Custom Line Navetta 26 was classified by the RINA, at B + F + Aa standard.

=== Custom Line 112' Next ===
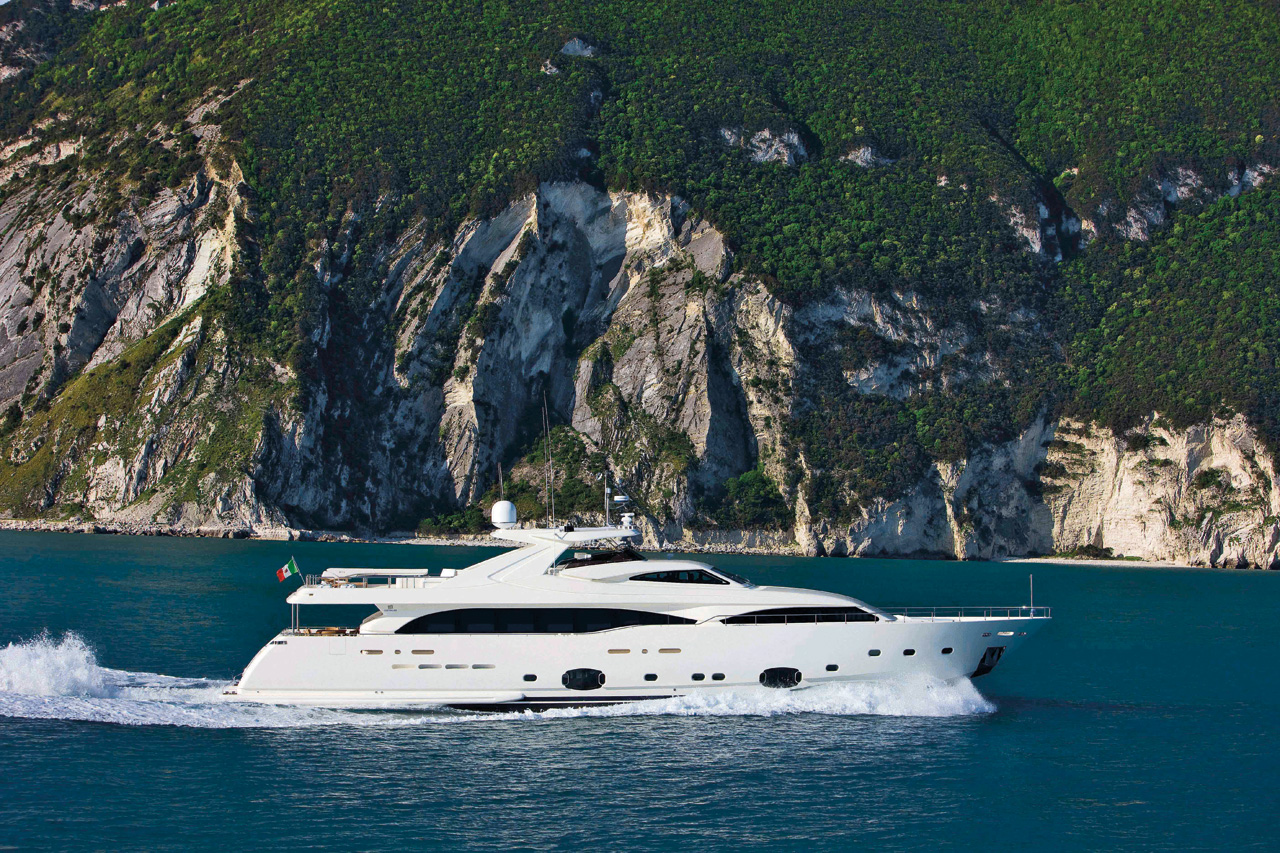
The Custom Line 112' Next

The Custom Line 112’ Next, which was first launched at Cannes in September 2008, is the direct successor to the Ferretti Custom Line 112’. This 34 meters (roughly 112 feet) planing yacht, which is produced at the Ancona shipyard, is over 7 meters wide. The hull and superstructure are built in multi-axis fibreglass, a composite material that offers advantages at equal weight, both as regards resistance and rigidity.

The yacht can carry up to 20 people plus 4 crew members and is powered by two 2775 hp motors which enable it to reach a maximum speed of 26 knots (48 km/h).

=== Custom Line Navetta 33 ===
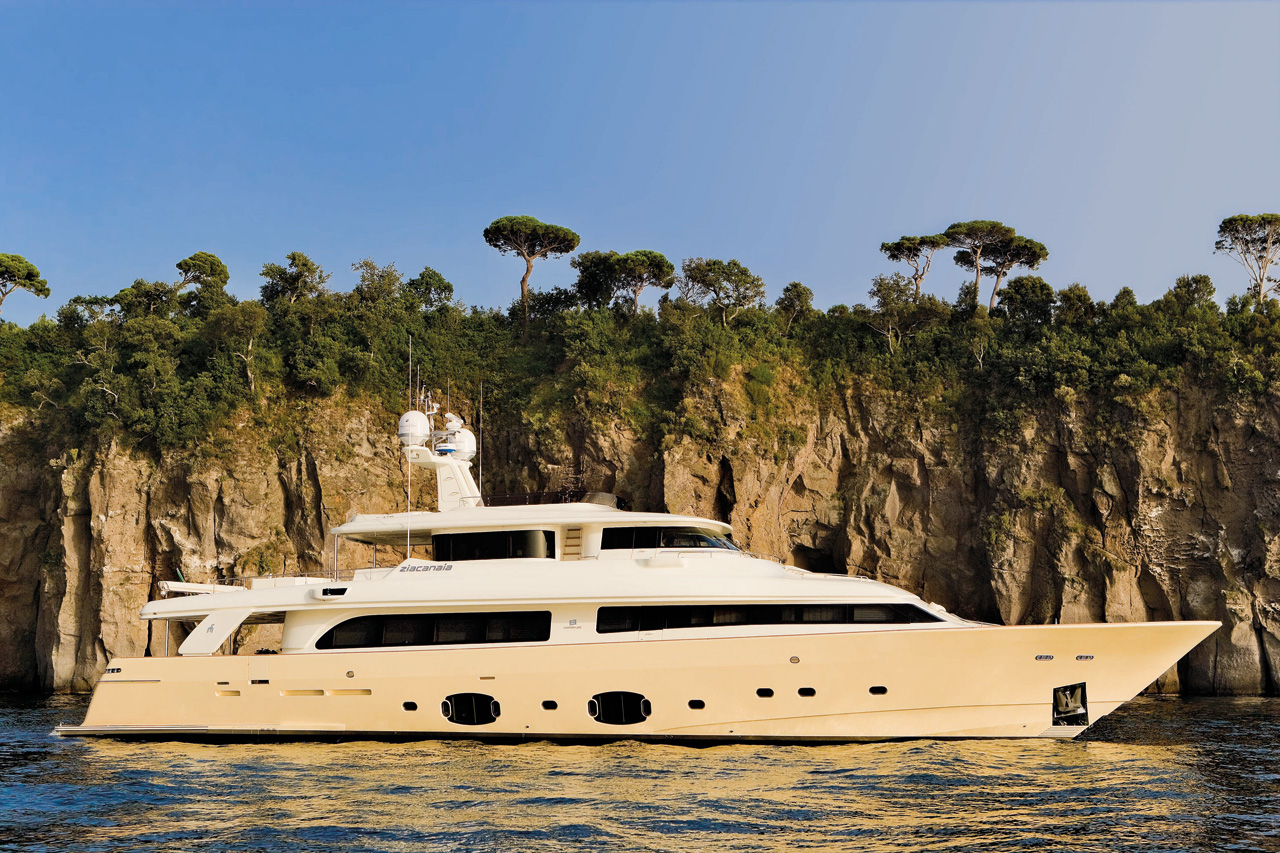
The Custom Line Navetta 33

The Navetta 33, which had its world premiere at the Festival International de la Plaisance in Cannes in September 2008, is the top model in the line of semi-displacement yachts of composite material produced by Custom Line. Approximately 33 meters long and 7 wide, this yacht has been designed with two alternative versions for the main deck and can carry 20 people, crew included. The top speed of 18 knots (33 km/h) and cruising speed of about 16 knots (30 km/h) are achieved thanks to two V12 1000 kW motors at 2300 revs per minute; the 15 thousand litre tank gives an estimated range of 850 nautical miles at a speed of 13 knots (24 km/h).

The Custom Line Navetta 33 is produced at the shipyard in Ancona and has been classified by the RINA, the Italian Naval Register, at RINA 100-A-1.1 "Y" standard.
