= Shaanxi Fast Auto Drive =

Chinese automatic transmission manufacturer

- Industry: Automotive parts
- Headquarters: Shaanxi, China
- Products: Automatic transmissions

Shaanxi Fast Auto Drive Group is one of the major automatic transmission manufacturers in China. It was founded in 1968, and formed a joint venture with Eaton Corporation. It is now the largest automatic transmission manufacturer in China.
