= Yaxing Coach =

Chinese bus manufacturer

Yangzhou Asiastar Bus Co., Ltd

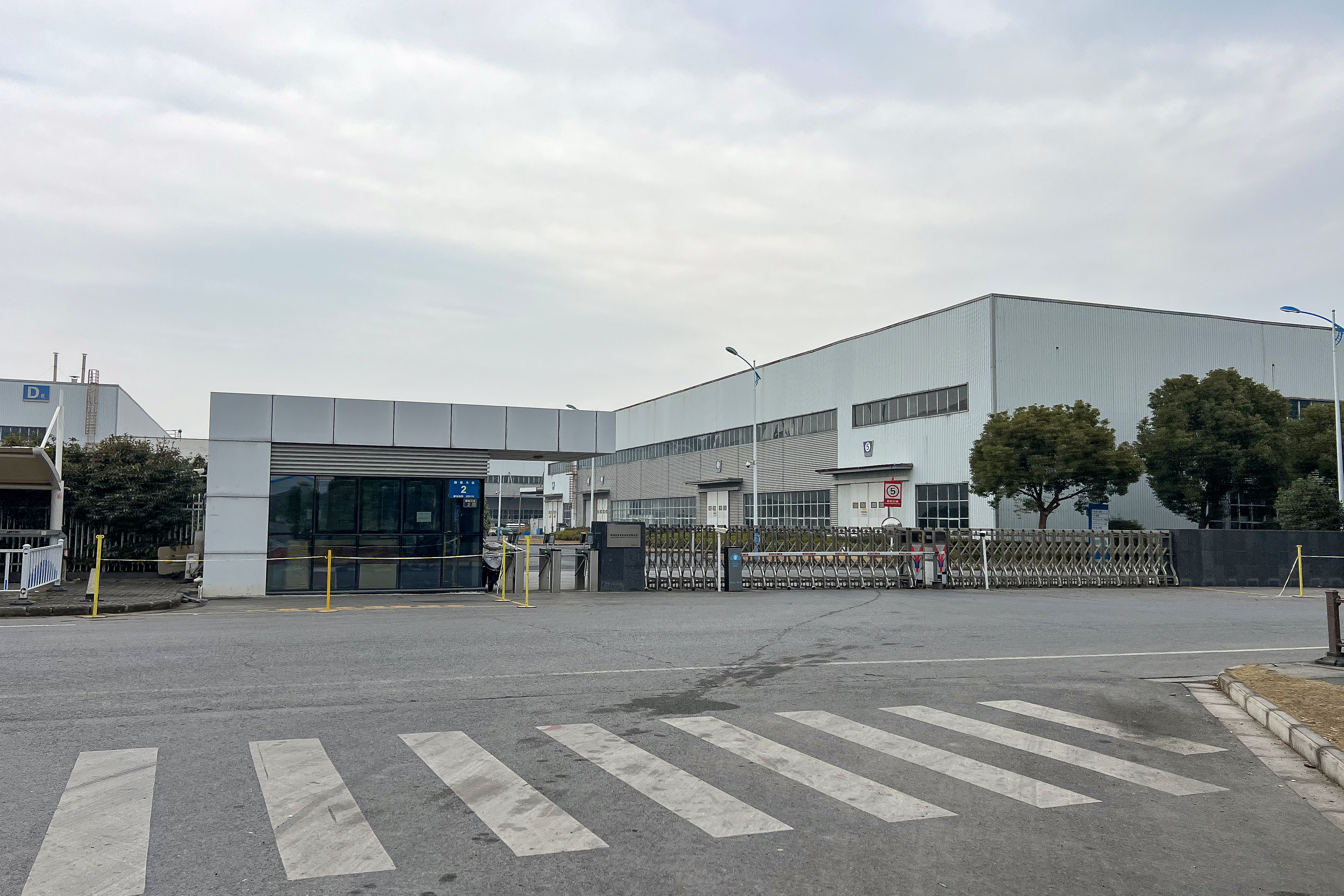
- Founded: 1998
- Headquarters: Yangzhou, Jiangsu, China
- Products: Buses
- Owner: Shandong Heavy Industry
- Parent: Jiangsu Yaxing
- Website: www.asiastarbus.com

Yangzhou Asiastar Bus Co., Ltd is a bus manufacturer based in Yangzhou, Jiangsu, China. Founded in 1998, it is a subsidiary of Jiangsu Yaxing. The company's brands include Yaxing, Yangtse, Eurise and AsiaStar. Yaxing buses are largely sold domestically in China, but also have a presence in a number of international markets. It is listed on the Shanghai Stock Exchange.

== History ==
Yangzhou Yaxing Motor Coach Co., Ltd., aka Asiastar, traces its origins to May 1949, when the Shanghai Military Control Commission assumed control of the former sapper squadron of the Kuomintang, renaming it the Automobile Maintenance Firm of Logistics Department of East China Air Force of the Chinese People's Liberation Army. This was moved to Yangzhou in April 1958, where it was merged with the Yangzhou Automobile Maintenance Factory as the Yangzhou Automobile Maintenance and Manufacture Factory, which began producing automobiles (branded Yunhe) and tractors (branded Gongnong), alongside farm equipment. After gaining experience, the factory began producing the JS130/JS140 heavy-duty trucks and JS340 dump trucks in the late 1960s, then began producing the JT661A bus chassis in 1979.

The factory was renamed to the Jiangsu Yangzhou Automobile Maintenance and Manufacture Factory (江苏省扬州汽车修造厂) in 1981, and the first JT663 coach was built and delivered to the Eighth Team of Jiangsu Passenger Transportation Co., Ltd. in February 1981. The JT663 was the first dedicated bus chassis built and the factory was renamed again to the Jiangsu Yangzhou Coach Manufacture Factory (江苏省扬州客车制造厂) in 1985. The company continued to develop buses, launching the JS6879 coach in 1989 in cooperation with the Xi'an Highway Institute, as the first domestic sleeper coach. The factory was renamed again to the Jiangsu Yangzhou Coach Manufacture Main Factory (江苏省扬州客车制造总厂) in 1990.

The JS6971 luxury inter-city tourism coach was launched in 1993, which marked the first use of a domestically-produced rear axle. The Jiangsu Asiastar Bus (Group) Co., Ltd. (江苏亚星客车集团有限公司) was founded in August 1996, followed by the Yangzhou Asiastar Motor Coach Co., Ltd. (扬州亚星客车股份有限公司 in September 1998, with the approval of the provincial government; Yangzhou Asiastar was then listed on the Shanghai Stock Exchange in August 1999.

Asiastar started several joint ventures with western companies, including Mercedes-Benz, to further develop domestic manufacturing and quality controls. In 2009, Weichai Group entered into a strategic framework cooperation agreement with Yangzhou Asiastar and the People's Republic of China and laid the cornerstone for a new Yangzhou factory in 2011. In 2012, Yangzhou Asiastar formed a holding company named Fengtai Bus and Coach International (FTBCI, 厦门丰泰汽车). The company's second factory is located in the Xiamen Free Trade Zone, which specializes in electric buses.

== Models ==
=== Transit buses ===
Asiastar City Buses
Model	Dimensions	Drivetrain	Fuel	Notes & Refs.
JS6120GHBEV	12,180 mm × 2,550 mm × 3,420 mm (40.0 ft × 8.4 ft × 11.2 ft)	permanent-magnet synchronous motor 245 kW (329 hp) & 3,329 N⋅m (2,455 lbf⋅ft) (peak)	242.3, 281.9, 363.4, or 422.9 kW-hr LiFePO_{4} battery	
JS6128GH	12,000 mm × 2,550 mm × 3,120 mm (39.4 ft × 8.4 ft × 10.2 ft)	WP7.270E51; 199 kW (267 hp) @ 2100 & 2,100 N⋅m (1,500 lbf⋅ft) @ 1200–1700 (peak)	200 L (44 imp gal; 53 US gal), diesel	
JS6126GH				
JS6108GH	10,490 mm × 2,500 mm × 3,120 mm (34.4 ft × 8.2 ft × 10.2 ft)	WP6.245E50; 180 kW (240 hp) @ 2300 & 900 N⋅m (660 lbf⋅ft) @ 1200–1600 (peak)	200 L (44 imp gal; 53 US gal), diesel	

- JS6106GH
- JS6110SH
- JS6111SHA
- JS6126GHA
- JS6127GHA
- JS6130SH
- JS6761GHA
- JS6770GHA
- JS6811GH
- JS6906GHA
- JS6906GHC
- JS6936GH

=== Coaches ===
- JS6882TA
- JS6990TA
- YBL6101H
- YBL6105HE32
- YBL6118H1E31
- YBL6119HJ
- YBL6121H
- YBL6123H
- YBL6123H1E31
- YBL6125H
- YBL6128H
- YBL6128SD
- YBL6796HE3
- YBL6805H
- YBL6856HE3
- YBL6905H1CJ
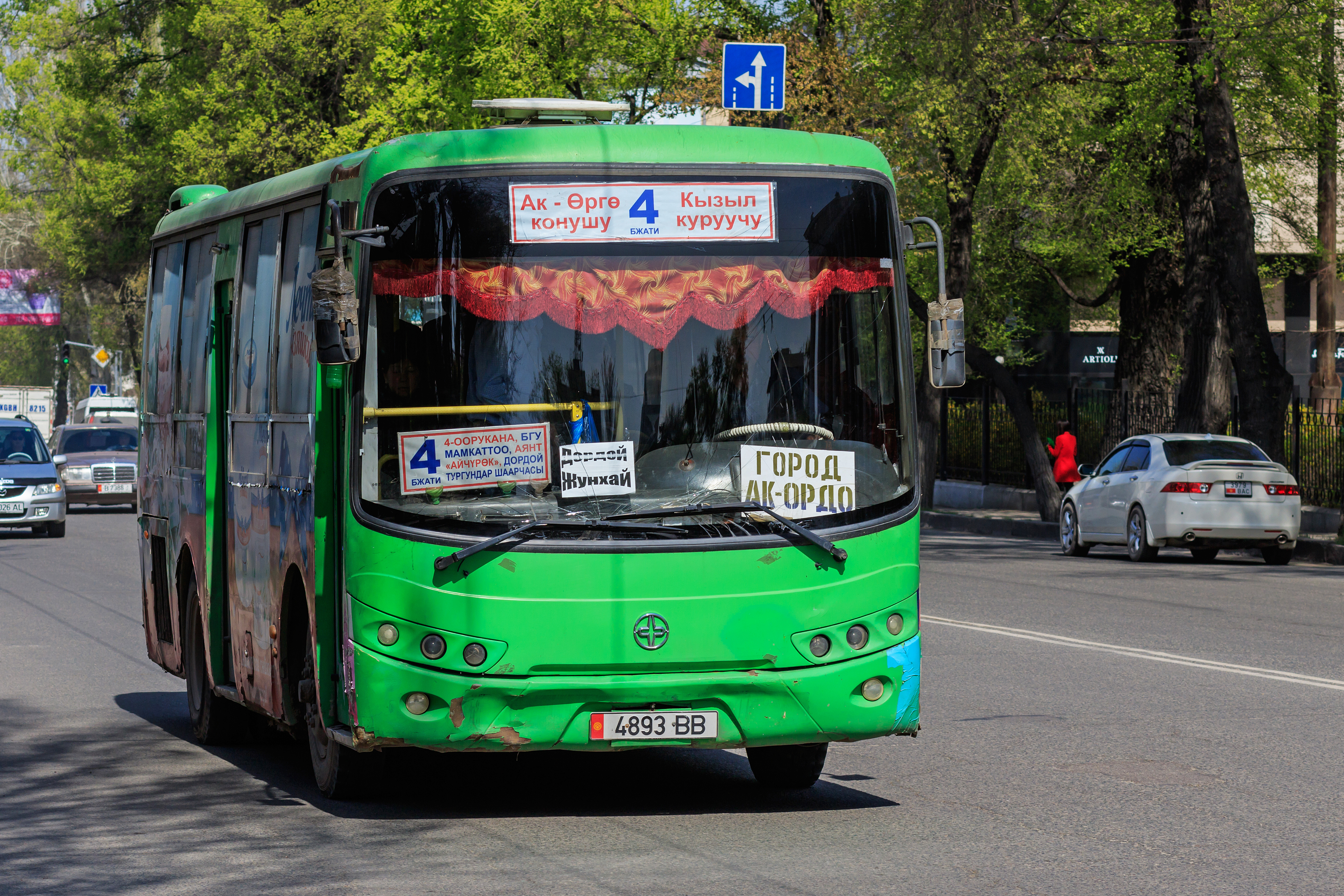
A Yaxing bus in Bishkek, Kyrgyzstan

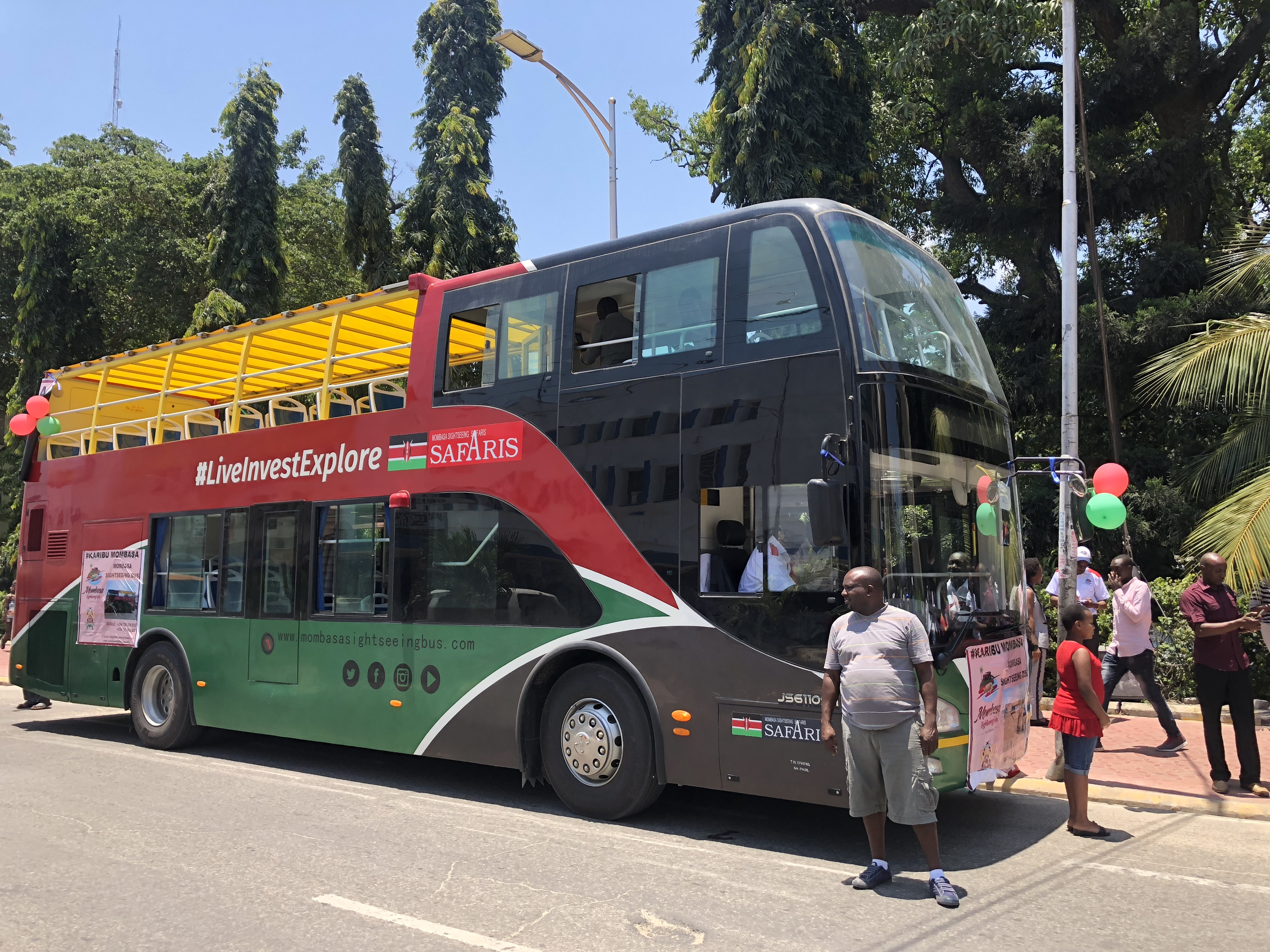
A JS6110SH bus in Mombasa, Kenya

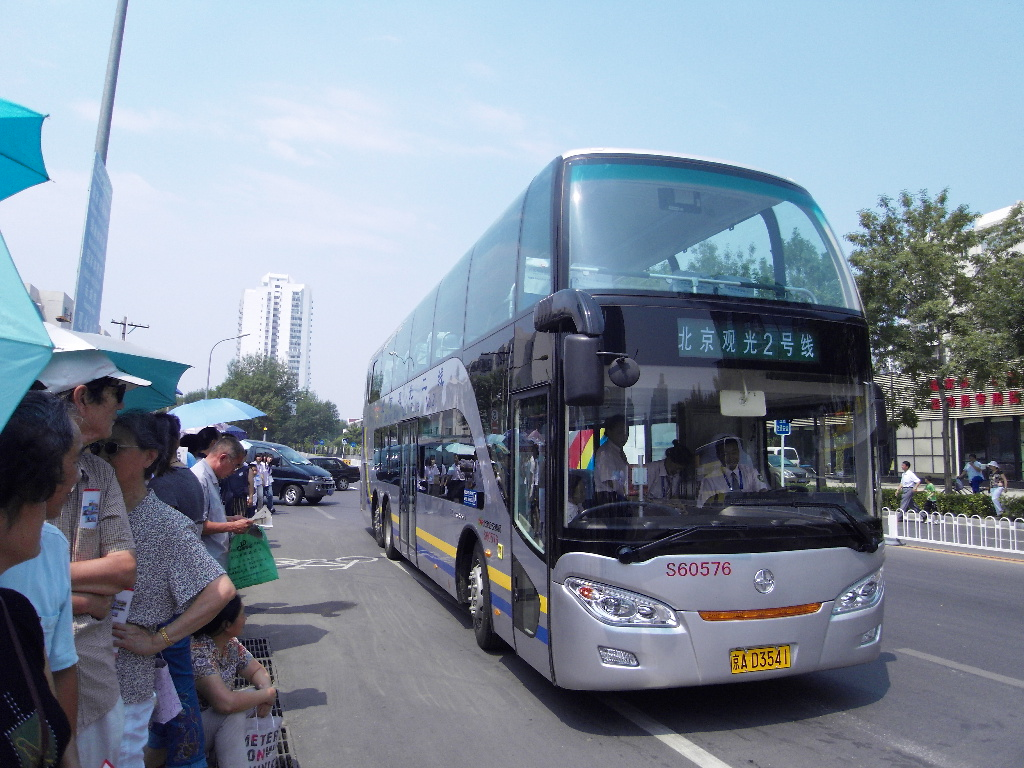
A Yaxing JS6130SHJ double-decker bus in Beijing, China

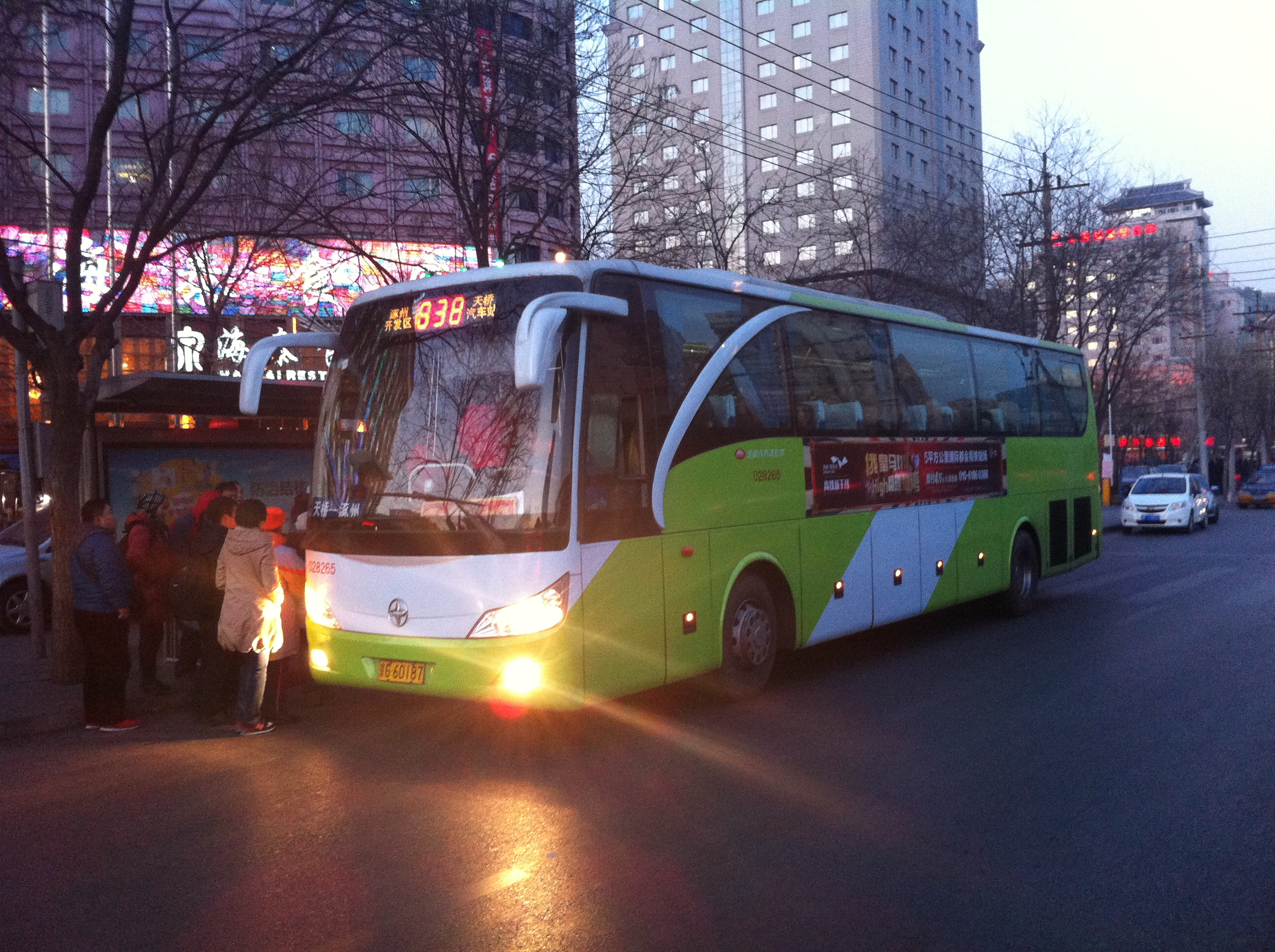
A Yaxing YBL6123HE4 bus serving route 838 en route to Zhuozhou, China

=== Special buses ===
- YBL5130XQCHE31 Police Bus

=== Mini buses ===
- JS6550T
- JS6600T
- JS6608TA
- JS6608TB
- JS6739TA
- JS6752T
- JS6830GHDP (exclusive to Canadian and US markets)
- YZL6701TA

=== School buses ===
- JS6600XC
- JS6660XC
- JS6730XC
- JS6790XC

=== Vans ===
- Eurise
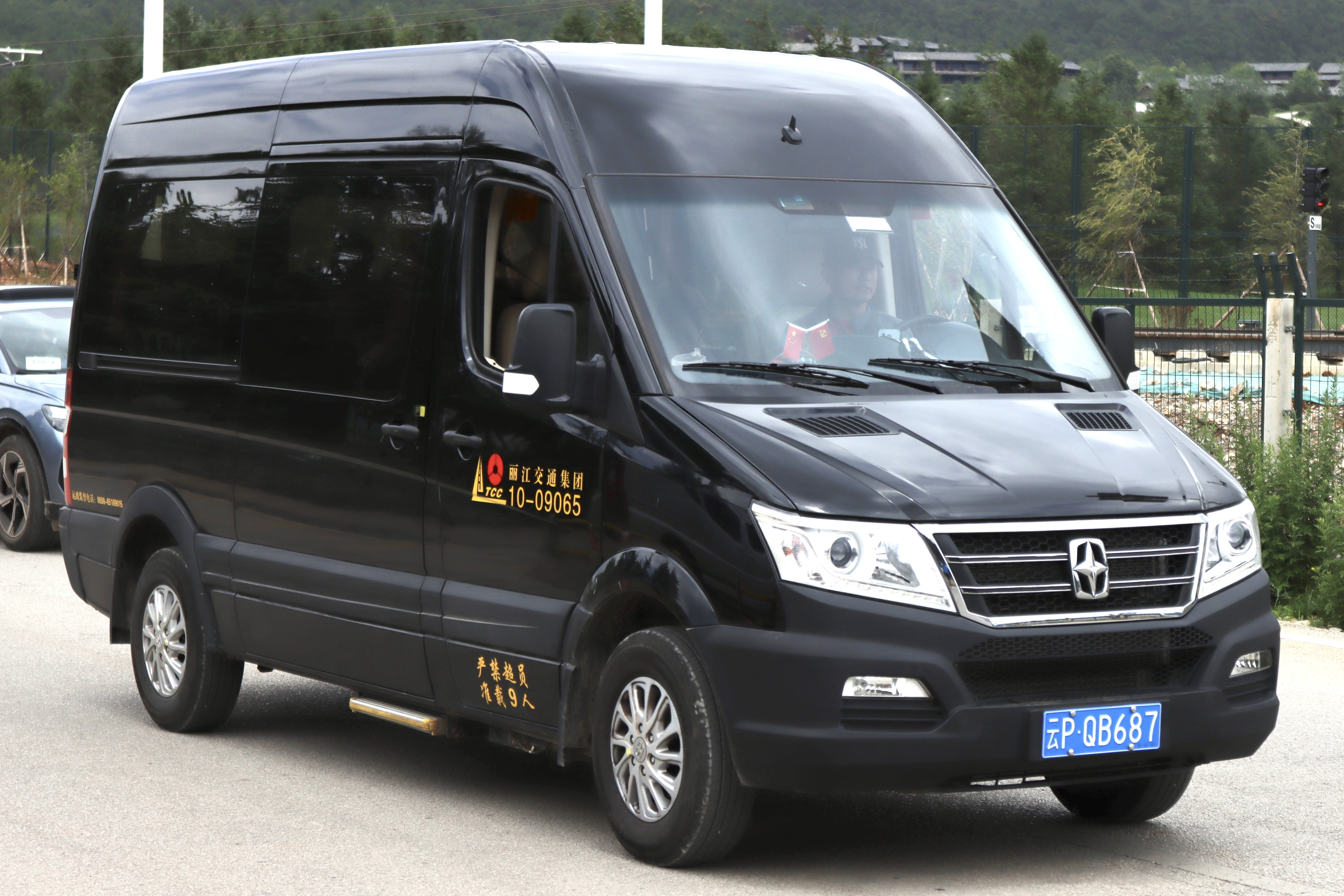
Weichai Eurise shuttle van

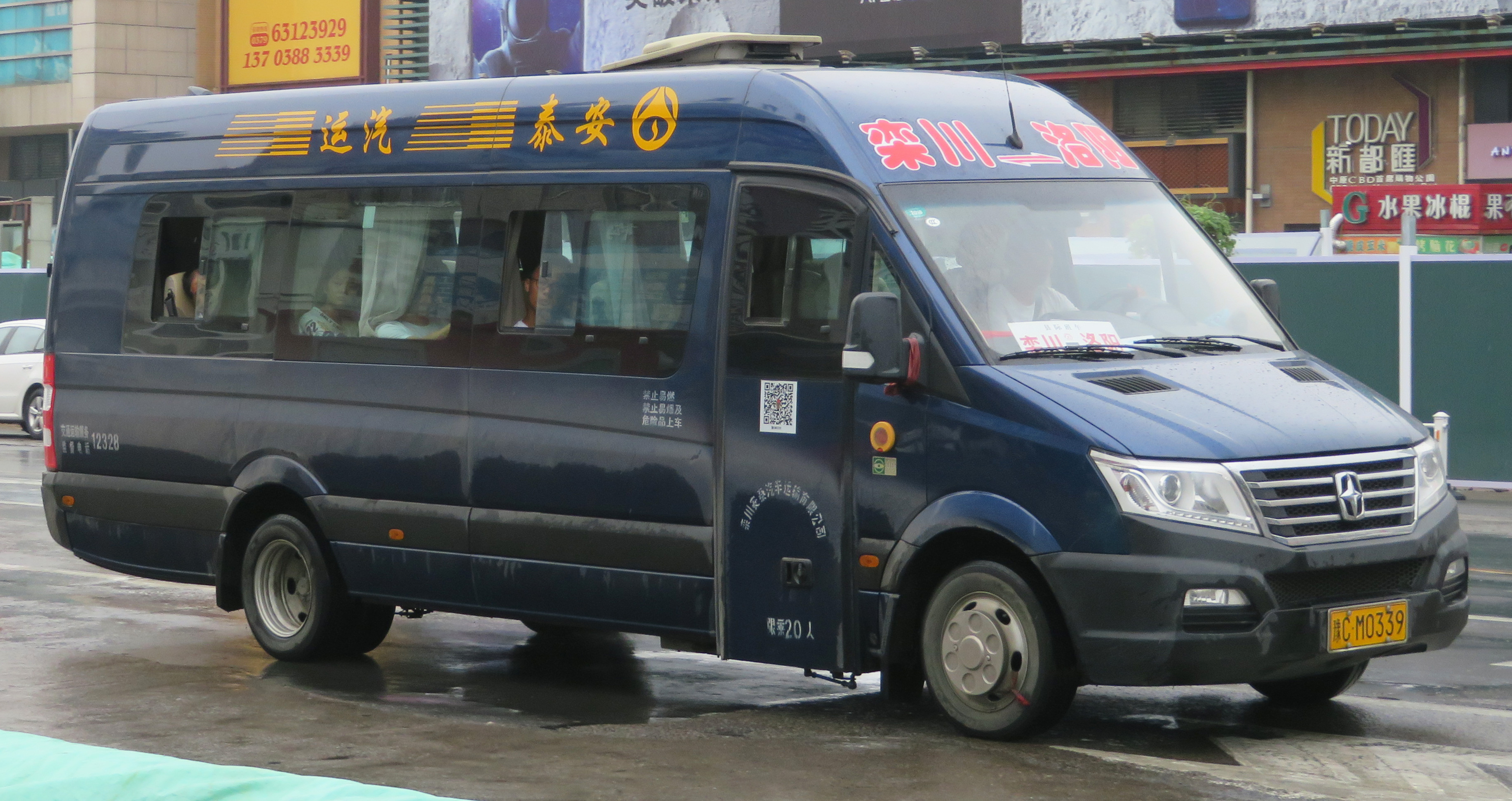
Weichai Eurise extended wheelbase

== See also ==
- Chinese Wikipedia page
