= KION Group =

German materials handling equipment manufacturer

Kion Group AG
- Type: Aktiengesellschaft
- Traded as: FWB: KGX; MDAX
- ISIN: DE000KGX8881
- Founded: 2006; 20 years ago
- Headquarters: Frankfurt, Germany
- Area served: Worldwide
- Key people: Rob Smith (Chief Executive Officer); Hans Peter Ring, (Chairman Supervisory Board)
- Products: intralogistics, industrial trucks and warehouse solutions
- Revenue: €11.5 billion (2024)
- Operating income: €917 million (2024)
- Net income: €314.4 million (2023)
- Total assets: €17.388 billion (2023)
- Total equity: €5.772 billion (2023)
- Number of employees: 42,325 (full-time equivalents at 31 December 2024)
- Website: www.kiongroup.com

Kion Group AG (styled as KION Group) is a German multinational manufacturer of materials handling equipment, with its headquarters in Frankfurt, Hesse, Germany. Its principal products are intralogistics, warehouse automation equipment, and industrial (forklift) trucks. Kion Group was founded in 2006 by the demerger of Linde's materials handling equipment operations. It is the world's second-largest manufacturer of forklifts measured by revenues (after Toyota Industries).

== Name ==
"Kion" is an invented name derived from the Swahili word "Kiongozi", which means "leader".

== History ==
=== Foundation and beginnings ===
On 6 September 2006, Linde AG announced a new structure following the completion of its acquisition of BOC, with the gas and engineering businesses of the combined entity operating as The Linde Group and the materials handling businesses (Linde Material Handling, Still, and OM Carrelli Elevatori S.p.A.) operating as Kion Group from then on. Linde AG sold Kion Group to a partnership of KKR and Goldman Sachs Alternatives for approximately €4 billion.

=== Acquisitions and expansion abroad ===
In January 2009, Kion Group formed a China-based forklift manufacturing joint venture, Kion Baoli (Jiangsu) Forklift, with Jiangsu Shangqi Group and Jingjiang Baoli Forklift. In May 2010, Kion Group acquired full management control of Kion Baoli.

In March 2011, Kion Group and the Indian engineering company Voltas agreed to form a new joint venture, Voltas Materials Handling, consisting of the two companies' material handling equipment operations in India. Kion Group acquired Voltas' 34% shareholding in the venture in November 2012.

In August 2012, the China-based Shandong Heavy Industry's Weichai Power subsidiary agreed to acquire a 25% stake in Kion Group for €467 million, and a 70% majority stake in Kion's hydraulics business for €271 million.

In February 2013, Kion Group sold product rights for Linde brand's reach stacker, empty, and laden container handlers to Finnish crane manufacturer Konecranes for an undisclosed sum.

=== Initial public offering and further expansion ===
The company was listed on the Frankfurt Stock Exchange on 28 June 2013, and in September 2014, the company was admitted to the MDAX of the Frankfurt stock exchange. Also in September 2014, Voltas Material Handling was renamed Kion India. Since then, the company has been selling forklift trucks with electric drives, combustion engines and warehouse technology products under the Voltas and Baoli brands in India. The Belgian company Egemin was acquired in 2015, followed by the US-based company Retrotech in 2016. In June 2016, Kion Group acquired Dematic for €1.9 billion. In 2017, the Group headquarters with around 200 employees was relocated from Wiesbaden to a new development area at Frankfurt Airport. One year later, Kion opened the Kion Digital Campus in Frankfurt, where digital projects are developed and implemented.

In 2018, Kion Group expanded its presence in China and agreed a strategic partnership with EP Equipment Co. Ltd in the light-duty or "entry-level" warehouse equipment segmente. KION has acquired a minority stake in the Chinese truck manufacturer, which in the previous year, 2017, achieved record shipments of 50,000 units.

In July 2019, Kion Group and BMZ Holdings announced a 50/50 joint venture to manufacture lithium-ion batteries (80V, 48V) for the Kion Group's trucks at BMZ's manufacturing facility. In November, Kion India opened a production facility for diesel and electric forklift trucks as well as battery-powered pallet trucks and reach trucks on an area of around 25 hectares in Pune, India. In March 2020, Kion acquired the UK-based company Digital Applications International Limited (DAI) for around €123 million.

=== Recent developments ===
In July 2021, Kion opened an industrial truck plant in Kołbaskowo near Szczecin, Poland, where counterbalance trucks for all brands in the Kion Industrial Trucks & Services segment are produced. In order to speed up delivery times, production of other product series, which had previously been manufactured exclusively in Xiamen, China, was also relocated to Kołbaskowo one year later.

In December 2021, Kion opened a counterbalance truck plant for the Kion companies Linde Material Handling and Baoli in Jinan, China on an area of around 223,000 square metres, which includes a research and development centre, a training centre and office space.

== Corporate structure ==
In the 2024 financial year, KION Group AG operated around 2,000 sales and service locations in over 100 countries, with an average workforce of 42,325 employees. The company reported consolidated revenue of €11.5 billion (2023: €11.4 billion), adjusted EBIT of €917 million (2023: €791 million), and an adjusted EBIT margin of 8.0% (2023: 6.9%). Free cash flow stood at €702 million (2023: €715 million). The company operates manufacturing plants and research and development centers in Europe, North and South America, Asia, and Australia. It has 25 subsidiaries in Germany and 107 subsidiaries abroad.

In February 2025, KION Group announced an efficiency program targeting annual cost savings of approximately €140 million to €160 million, to be fully implemented by 2026. The program is expected to result in one-time expenses of approximately €240 million to €260 million in 2025.

== Products and brands ==
The Kion Group is a provider of industrial trucks and supply chain services. Its range of products and services includes industrial trucks such as forklift trucks and warehouse trucks, as well as integrated automation technologies.

The Kion Group markets its products under six brands: Dematic offers products for automated material flow for supply chain and automation processes. Linde and Still serve the market for industrial trucks in a higher price category, while Baoli focuses on the economy segment. Fenwick is the largest supplier of industrial trucks in France, OM Still is the market leader in Italy, while OM Voltas serves the Indian market as the leading supplier of industrial trucks.

== Research & development ==
In August 2020, Kion entered into a strategic partnership with the Chinese manufacturer of autonomous mobile robots, Quicktron Intelligent Technology Co., Ltd, which, in addition to the global distribution of Quicktron products by Kion, provides for the joint development of automated vehicles.

In October 2021, Kion licensed an AI-equipped autonomous vehicle fleet for sorting and distribution, developed by Fraunhofer IML in Dortmund and has collaborated on its further development since.

In December 2023, Kion and Aschaffenburg Technical University presented the results of a research project in which scenarios for the use of autonomous counterbalance trucks equipped with electro-hydraulic steering were developed.

In January 2025, Kion partnered with NVIDIA and Accenture to integrate "Physical AI" into warehouse operations. This initiative involves using NVIDIA Omniverse to create digital twins of warehouses, allowing advanced simulations and real-time optimizations. The collaboration is expected to enhance warehouse automation, efficiency, and flexibility in supply chain operations.

== Sustainability ==
Since the beginning of 2023, the company has been developing and producing fuel cell systems for the company's own industrial trucks in the field of hydrogen drives. In the same year, Kion began production of a 24-volt fuel cell system for warehouse trucks and the construction of a state-funded hydrogen refuelling station with an electrolyser.

As part of the "Kion 2027 Strategy", Kion committed to the Science Based Targets initiative (SBTi) in July 2023. In line with the principles of the SBTi, the company is pursuing the net zero target of being emission-free by 2050 at the latest.

Kion Group, through its subsidiary Kion Battery Systems in Karlstein am Main, manufactures lithium-ion batteries for its electric industrial trucks (Linde MH, Fenwick, Still, Baoli) and automated warehouse operations. In September 2023, Kion partnered with Li-Cycle Holding Corp. to launch an eco-friendly lithium-ion battery recycling program in Magdeburg, aiming to reclaim up to 95% of the batteries' valuable minerals and materials. According to their own statement, Kion intends to recycle up to 5,000 tonnes of battery materials by 2030.
