= Weichai Power =

Chinese automotive supplying company

Weichai Power Co., Ltd.
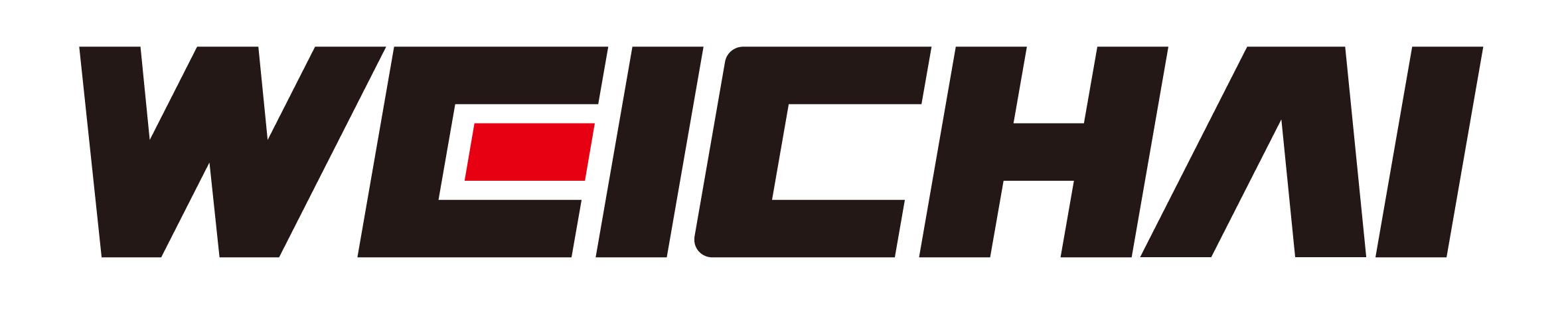
- Native name: 潍柴动力股份有限公司
- Traded as: SEHK: 2338; SZSE: 000338
- Industry: Industrial machinery
- Founded: 2002; 24 years ago
- Headquarters: Weifang, Shandong, China
- Area served: Worldwide
- Key people: Chairman: Tan Xuguang
- Products: Automotive parts Diesel engines Forklifts
- Revenue: $28.38 billion (2021)
- Net income: $1.334 billion (2021)
- Number of employees: 81,600 (2021)
- Parent: Shandong Heavy Industry Group Co., Ltd.
- Subsidiaries: Moteurs Baudouin
- Website: www.weichaipower.com

Weichai Power Co., Ltd. is a Chinese developer and manufacturer of diesel engines in Weifang, Shandong in the People's Republic of China. It also manufactures forklifts and non-diesel engine automotive parts.

== History ==
Weifang Diesel Engine Works, 1953

Weichai Power was founded on 23 December 2002. Its shares began trading on the Hong Kong Stock Exchange in 2004 and the Shenzhen Stock Exchange in 2007.

In 2009, Weichai bought French marine engine manufacturer Moteurs Baudouin. In 2012, it agreed to buy a 25% stake in German forklift manufacturer KION Group for €738 million; the stake grew to 38.25% by 2016.

Launching of Weichai New logo, Ferrari, China, 2014

Weichai became the first Scuderia Ferrari sponsor from China in January 2013; the sponsorship was to end in 2016.

The company appeared on the Fortune 500 list for the first time in 2021, ranking 425th.

Weichai WP12 for heavy duty truck applications

Since 1999, Weichai Group has partnered itself with Bosch, an engineering company based in Gerlingen, Germany, to share research and development on technologies such as fuel cells and common rail fuel-injection systems. On November 3, 2023, they both signed a strategic cooperation agreement where they agreed to cooperate on the development of new technologies, such as high thermal efficiency diesel engines.

In 2023 Weichai partnered with BYD, a Shenzhen-based electric vehicle manufacturer and also the biggest electric vehicle manufacturer in the world. Both companies plan to develop new electric vehicle technology, as Weichai has planned since 2010 to focus on new energy options and has invested approximately $550 million in research and development of electric, hybrid and hydrogen fuel cell engines.

In 2024 Weichai demonstrated the most efficient diesel engine in the world at the World Congress on Internal Combustion Engines in Tianjin, China. This diesel engine has 53.09% thermal efficiency as verified by Technischer Überwachungsverein, an international testing body. It is expected that the engine would perform with 14% better fuel efficiency than previous engines, which would reduce operating costs and reduce carbon footprint.

== Achievements ==
- 2007 China Quality Award
- 2023 Manufactured engine for the most powerful truck in the world, the Shacman X6000, producing 800 horsepower.
- 2024 Most efficient diesel engine in the world with 53.09% thermal efficiency.
