= Ferretti Group =

Italian shipbuilding company

Coordinates: 44.2101598°N 12.101912°E

Ferretti S.p.A. (Ferretti Group)
- Type: Società per Azioni
- Traded as: FTSE Italia Mid Cap: YACHT
- Industry: Yachtbuilding
- Founded: 1968 (Bologna)
- Founder: Alessandro and Norberto Ferretti
- Headquarters: Forlì, Italy
- Area served: Worldwide
- Key people: Tan Ning (Chairman); Stassi Anastassov (CEO)
- Products: Yachts
- Revenue: 1.2 billion € (2025)
- Owner: 37.5% Ferretti International Holding; 10% Flipnation Limited; 5.2% Iervolino Danilo; 4.5% Kheope Sa; 42.6% Market
- Subsidiaries: view all subsidiaries
- Website: www.ferrettigroup.com

Ferretti S.p.A. (trading as Ferretti Group) is a multinational shipbuilding company headquartered in Forlì which specialises in the design, construction and sale of luxury motor yachts. Its products are sold under the brands Wally, Ferretti Yachts, Custom Line, Pershing, Itama, Riva, Mochi Craft and CRN.

The company was founded in 1968 by Alessandro and Norberto Ferretti as a manufacturer of small boats and produced its first motor sailer in 1971. The Group expanded through making numerous acquisitions, including of Cantieri Navali dell'Adriatico – CNA S.r.l. in 1998, CRN S.p.A., in 1999, Riva S.p.A. in 2000, Cantiere Navale Mario Morini and in 2002, Itama in 2004 and Allied Marine in 2008. Ferretti Group was acquired by the Chinese multinational heavy machinery and automotive manufacturing company Weichai Group in 2012.

Ferretti Group has manufacturing operations in Italy and the United States. It has subsidiary companies in the United States (Ferretti Group North America) and representative branches in Hong Kong and Shanghai (Ferretti Group Asia Pacific).

== History ==
=== 1968 to 2000 ===
In 1968, brothers Alessandro (1937–1996) and Norberto Ferretti (1946), sons of a fuel trader who also owned a car dealership in Bologna, decided to expand the business to the nautical sector after securing the Italian representation for the US motorboat brand Chris Craft. They subsequently opened a multi-window shop, Ferretti Nautica, in the city centre.

The first self-built boat was launched in 1971 at a shipyard in Cattolica, using the hull of an 11-metre fishing boat. This boat was presented at the Genoa Boat Show as Ferretti Craft, marking the beginning of the company's first orders. Four years later, in 1975, the Ferretti brothers permanently abandoned the motor industry and opened their shipyard in San Giovanni in Marignano.

Since the 1980s, production has focused exclusively on motorboats, incorporating advanced technological solutions, such as the thousand-litre tanks and the so-called "round shower". In 1982, the company introduced its first motor-only boat and began producing sport fisherman open and flybridge type boats. In 1987, when sales were already around a hundred boats a year, the Forlì shipyard was opened, which has since then also become the company's headquarters.

In 1989, the Engineering Direction, a research centre dedicated to the design and development of new production boats and innovative materials, was founded.

The company also entered the world of sport: Norberto Ferretti competed in Class 1, the most prestigious offshore category, with one of the first carbon-fibre boats, and in 1994 he became world champion. In 1997 his team won a second world title. In 1996, Alessandro died at the age of 54 in an accident, while mowing the grass at his villa in the hills of Bologna.

In 1994, Ferretti Group began an international marketing process by establishing a strategic network of dealers outside Europe. During the second half of the 1990s, after institutional investors acquired a stake in the company, an external expansion strategy was initiated through the acquisition of companies producing luxury motoryachts.

In 1996, Ferretti Group began operating in the segment of yachts with fibreglass flybridges, measuring 28 to 40 metres in length, through Custom Line S.p.A.

In 1998, the Group purchased Cantieri Navali dell'Adriatico – CNA S.r.l., which specialized in building open type motor boats with the prestigious Pershing brand.

During the same year, Ferretti Group entered in the sport fisherman craft segment with the acquisition of American company Bertram Yacht, Inc. – the Miami shipyard. Bertram Yacht was sold in 2015.

In 1999, Ferretti Group purchased CRN S.p.A., a shipyard specialising in the production of maxiyachts in fibreglass and megayachts with steel hulls and aluminium superstructures, measuring over 30 metres in length.

=== 2000 to 2010 ===
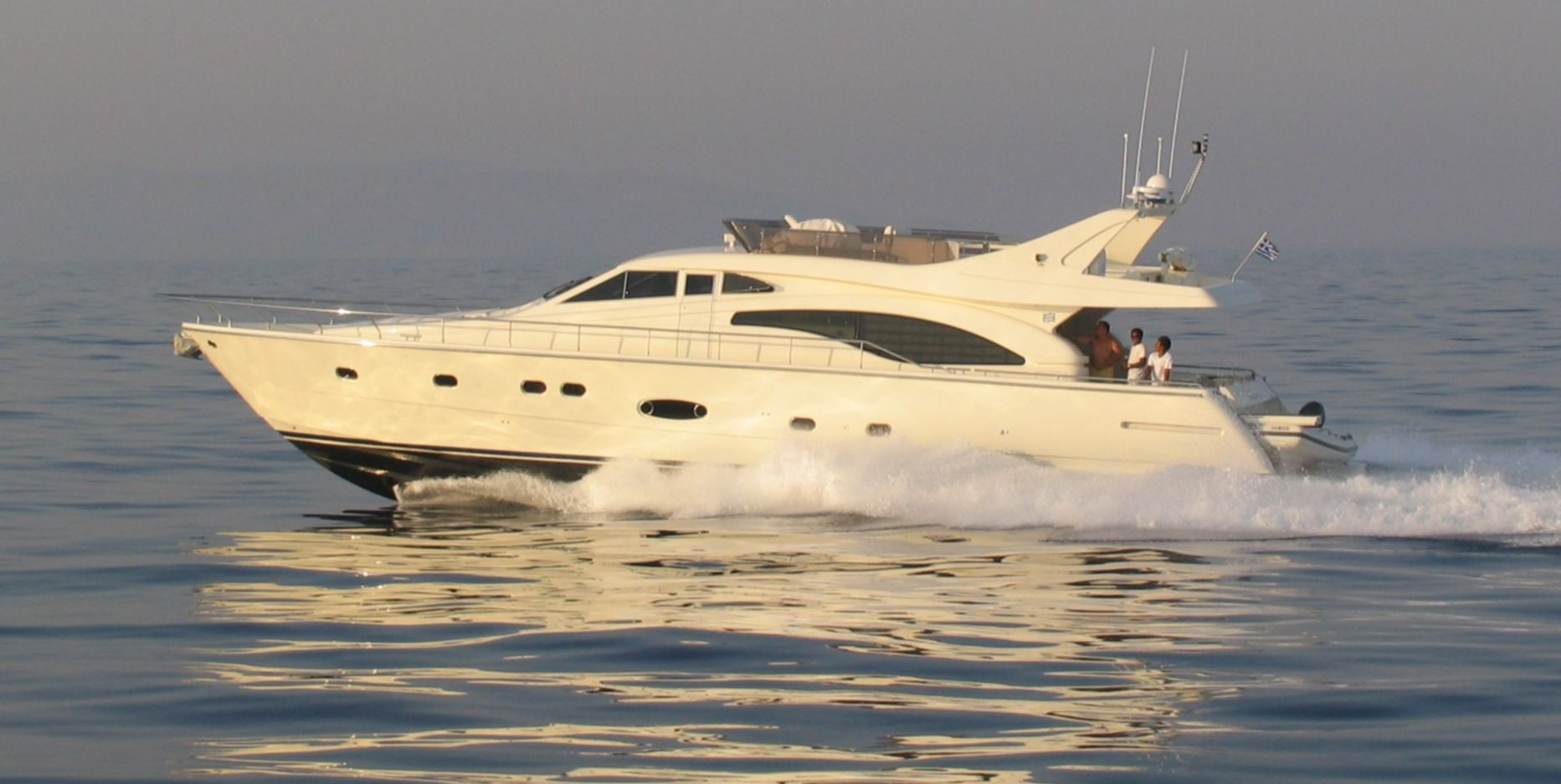
Ferretti model 68' (2005) cruising at 31 knots.

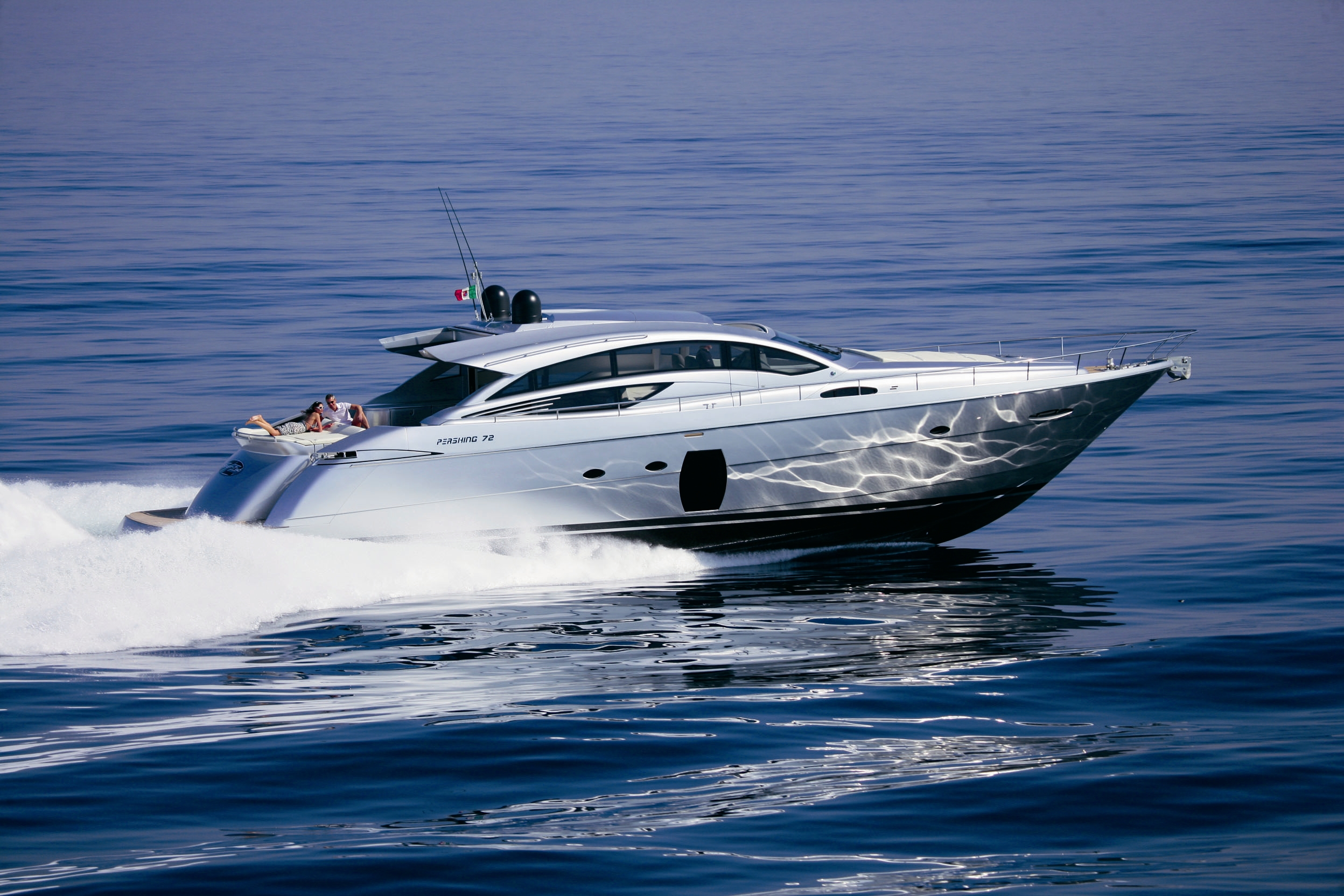
Pershing 72, European Powerboat of the Year 2008 in the category 50 feet and over

In the year 2000, Ferretti purchased 100% of the capital of Riva S.p.A., a producer of luxury fibreglass yachts measuring 10 to 35 metres in length, both flybridge and open.

In June 2000, with the aim of further consolidating its growth and development process, Ferretti Group decided to list on the Official Italian Stock Exchange (MTA). In 2001, the company was admitted to the STAR segment (High Requisite Share Segment) of the Borsa Italiana (Italian Stock Exchange).

In May 2001, Ferretti acquired the assets of the Oram shipyard in La Spezia, where the new Riva production area would subsequently be built.

In August 2001, Ferretti finalized an agreement for the acquisition of the Apreamare S.p.A. shipyards in Sorrento, a leader in the production of gozzo sorrentino boats measuring 7 to 16 metres in length.

In November 2001, acquisition of the Mochi Craft S.r.l. shipyard in Pesaro was finalized.

In 2002, the Group took over Diesse Arredamenti, to acquire new skills in the nautical furnishings sector, complementary to its yacht building activity.

During the same year, the Group also finalized acquisition of Cantiere Navale Mario Morini in Ancona, which enabled CRN to extend its production capacity, Pinmar S.L., a company specialized in yacht painting and refitting, and Zago S.p.A., an Italian company operating in high-profile wooden manufactured pieces and furnishings.

Between June 2002 and January 2003, the Ferretti management team and institutional investors present among the shareholders (Permira), decided to launch a Voluntary Public Tender Offer to acquire the entire share capital of the Company, with the aim of further expanding the Group through acquisitions and a precise strategic, national and international plan.

In 2004, through Pershing, Ferretti Group acquired the Itama shipyard, which specializes in the construction of open motoryachts, completing the definition of the Group.

In 2008, Ferretti Group acquired the assets, brands and activities of Allied Marine, an American company specialized in After Sales services and marketing of both new yachts and pre-owned motor yachts, as well as brokerage services on the US market.

=== 2009 to 2023 ===
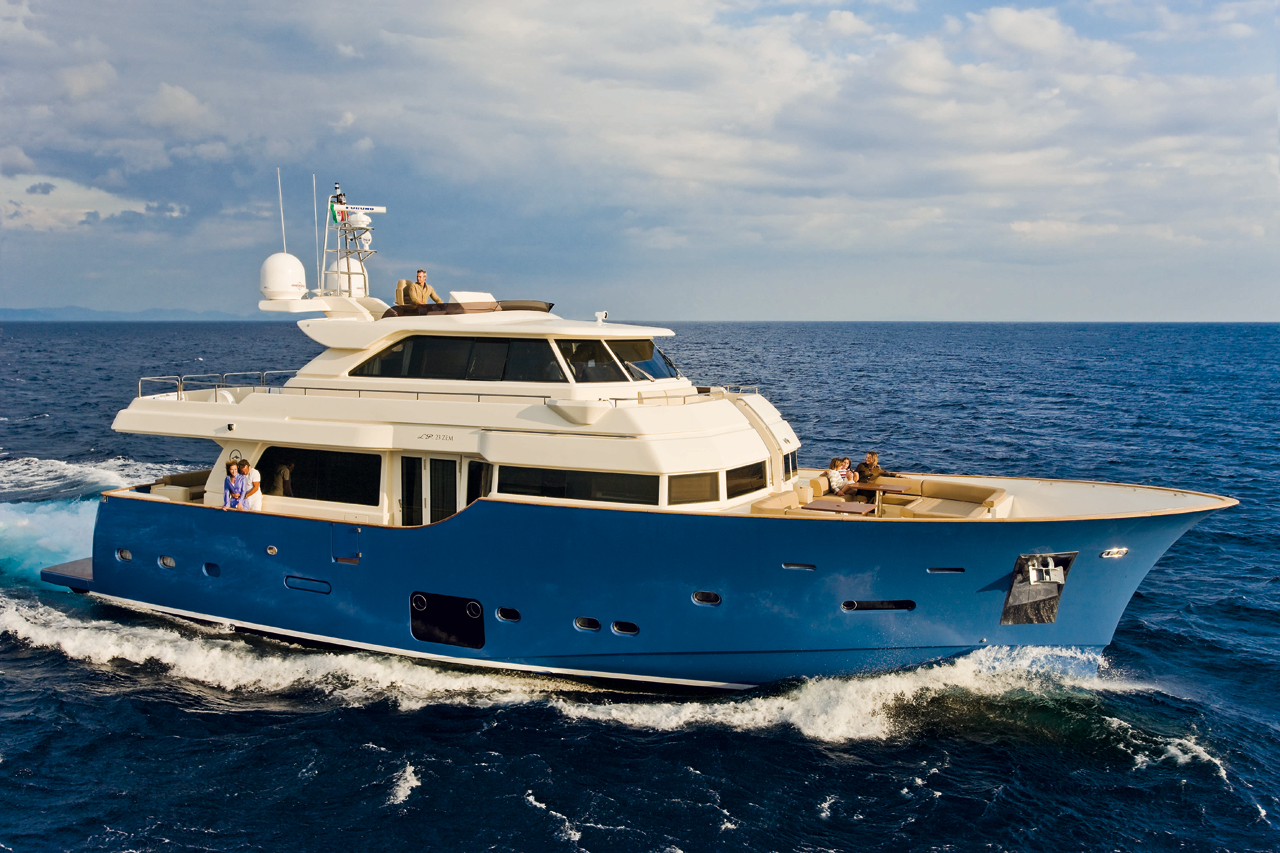
A Mochi Craft Long Range 23

In 2009, to align to the new market scenario, Ferretti Group changed its organisational structure and undertook a series of strategic and operative actions. In December, with the aim of continuing to focus on its core business, the Ferretti Group sold its 60% holding in Pinmar S.L., a Spanish company specializing in painting mega-yachts to Irish entrepreneur Sean Ewing.

In March 2010, Ferretti continued its divestment policy by selling 100% of Apreamare S.p.A., which included the nautical pole of Torre Annunziata (Naples), to the Aprea and Pollia families, the founders of the historic Sorrento brand.

In January 2012, Shandong Heavy Industry Group-Weichai Power, a Chinese state-controlled manufacturer of excavators and tractors, acquired 58% of Ferretti Group for EUR 374 million. At the time of the transaction, Ferretti had a debt of EUR 600 million. The management was, in any case, reconfirmed by the new shareholders.

In September 2013, the new Ferretti brand structure was presented, consisting of three product lines: Ferretti Yachts, Ferretti Custom Line and Ferretti Navetta. At this stage, the Group owns the Ferretti Yachts, Riva, Pershing, Itama, Mochi Craft, CRN and Custom Line brands.

In 2016 Piero Ferrari, Enzo Ferrari's son, joined the Ferretti Group by purchasing 13.2% of the capital through the family holding company F Investments, thus becoming the sole shareholder besides the Chinese Weichai Power Group, majority holders with 86.8%. Back in profit after two years, in 2017 the Ferretti Group presented the 74-metre-long mega-yacht "Cloud 9" in Monaco.

Two years later, the company entered the sailing world for the first time by acquiring Wally, a company founded by Luca Bassani.

On 17 October 2019, the Group renounced its listing on the Milan Stock Exchange due to a too low offer price, which fell from the initial range of EUR 2.5–3.7 to EUR 2-2.5.

In September 2022, the company finalised the acquisition of a majority stake in two companies that are part of its supply chain: Massello Srl and Fratelli Canalicchio Spa, the former specialising in wooden furniture for yachts, the latter in the production of static exteriors and automatic kinetic systems.

In March 2023, the Group acquired from Rossetti Marino the San Vitale shipyard, a production site of over 70,000 square metres in the port of Ravenna, allocating it to the construction of Wally sailing yachts and the Ferretti Yachts INFYNITO range.

As of 31 March 2022, the company is listed on the Hong Kong Stock Exchange and as of 27 June 2023 also on the Italian Stock Exchange.

== Operations ==
=== Brands ===
Ferretti Group specializes in the design, construction and marketing of luxury yachts and pleasure boats through seven brands:

- Wally: founded by Luca Bassani Antivari in 1994, the brand joined the Group in 2019 and produces sailing yachts made mainly of carbon fiber and motor yachts of different sizes.
- Ferretti Yachts: established in 1968, the brand represents the Group's historic production line. The fleet is composed of the "Flybridge" and "INFYNITO" ranges: the former includes customizable yachts ranging from 50 to 100 feet, while the latter, launched in 2022 and inspired by explorer vessels (boats designed to travel long distances), emphasizes visual continuity between the interior and exterior (a feature from which the name of the entire line is derived) and incorporates more sustainable materials and navigation technologies.
- Pershing: created in 1985 and acquired by Ferretti Group in 1998, the brand produces of sport yachts ranging from 16 to 43 meters, with hi-tech navigation systems and engines capable of reaching speeds of up to 50 knots. Production is divided into the "Fleet," "X," and "Superyacht" lines, to which the GTX range was added in 2022 in the "Sport Utility Yacht" category.
- Itama: founded in Rome in 1969 by Mario Amati and part of the Group since 2004, the brand produces open yachts known for their use of traditional white and blue tones and a deep V-shaped hull, which allows for solidity and handling.
- Riva: founded in 1842 as a shipyard active in the repair and construction of work and pleasure boats typical of the Lake Iseo area, it became part of the Ferretti Group in 2000. It produces yachts and superyachts ranging from 8 to 90 meters in length, in the open, sportfly, flybridge and superyachts types.
- CRN: founded in 1963 by Sanzio Nicolini and based in Ancona, Italy, the brand designs and constructs customizable yachts made from aluminum or steel/aluminum, up to 90 meters in length. After joining the Ferretti Group in 1999, it gained recognition for innovative components such as the "round stern" developed in the 1990s, the "open stern," and a functional balcony that can be used while sailing, introduced in the early 2000s.
- Custom Line: founded in 1996, the brand produces custom composite superyachts starting from 30 meters in length, divided into three distinct lines. The "Planing" range features yachts designed to balance speed, volume, and functionality. The "Navetta" line offers models customizable for long-distance travel. The "Aluminum" project includes a 50-meter superyacht made from aluminum, which enhances volume and reduces emissions.

=== Related companies ===
The Group also operates through four companies specializing in various sectors of the marine industry:

- Allied Marine: founded in 1945 in Miami and acquired in 2008, it specializes in the sale, brokerage, and chartering of yachts, with a division focused on the superyacht market of over 100 feet. The company holds exclusive rights to sell Ferretti Yachts, Riva, Pershing, Itama, and Mochi Craft boats on the East Coast of the United States.
- Fratelli Canalicchio SpA: founded in 1996 by brothers Giovanni and Pasquale Canalicchio, who specialize in precision engineering, the company was acquired by Ferretti Group in 2022. In addition to producing static exteriors and automatic kinetic systems, it is specialized in stainless steel furniture solutions.
- Il Massello SRL: based in Sant'Ippolito in the province of Pesaro, the company specializes in the design and manufacture of wooden interiors for yachts. The company, which had been a long-time supplier, joined the Ferretti Group in 2022.
- Zago SpA: founded in Venice in 1908 by Carlo Zago, a craftsman specialized in the processing and repair of furniture, since the 1970s it has also been taking care of the furnishings of yachts and large ships. In 2004, it sold the majority of its shares to Ferretti Group, with the aim of supporting the development of the business in the nautical sector.

=== Shipyards ===
Ferretti Group has production facilities in: Ancona, Forlì, Cattolica, Mondolfo, La Spezia and Sarnico, Italy.

== Corporate affairs ==
=== Financial data ===
	Revenues (thousands €)	Net income (thousands €)	EBITDA (thousands €)
2025	1,280,556	90,104	202,756
2024	1,240,346	88,160	190,246
2023	1,134,484	83,503	169,246
2022	1,030,099	60,546	139,989
2021	898,421	37,383	102,569

=== Ownership ===
In 1995, after the sudden death of Alessandro Ferretti, 70% of the Group was acquired by Permira. In 2000, it was temporarily listed in the Italian Stock Exchange, but decided to be taken private citing concerns for negative financial climate by the September 11, 2001 attacks. Permira had a 54 times return of its original investment from the listing.

In October 2006, the owners reconsidered flotation and filed an application to list its shares on the Milan Stock Exchange. Due to a high level of interest from private equity buyers, the IPO was postponed. Candover bought 60% of the company in an auction, outbidding the French PAI Partners and leaving the rest 30% to the founder and 10% to Permira. Based on financial data, the group was valued at 1.7 billion euros.

In May 2008, when the full extend of the crisis had not yet hit, rumours circulated indicating Candover was eyeing a second IPO for the business which was seeing profits of EUR 158m on a EUR 933m turnover (2007). In September, the Consob granted the authorization for the IPO on both the London and Milan bourses.

However, in January 2009, the company appointed Rothschild to advise on talks with its banking syndicate, led by Royal Bank of Scotland (RBS) and Mediobanca to restructure a EUR 1.1bn debt. Initially Candover was expected to participate in a EUR 100m capital injection but by February, it had walked away from the table, writing off its investment; Permira had already done so.

Since then the company has succeeded in renegotiating its debt, reducing its to EUR 550m against a conversion of credits into exit participation rights, a EUR 85m capital injection underwritten by the founder and CEO, Norberto Ferretti and some of the management team (EUR 70m) and Mediobanca (EUR 15m). RBS has also agreed to grant medium-term facilities to fund working capital requirements (EUR 65m) and three major financial institutions (already partnering with Ferretti), have extended the short-term facilities (EUR 24m) to medium-term ones.

From that time on, the Group's equity was held by Norberto Ferretti and the Group's management (38.2%), Mediobanca (8.8%) and senior and mezzanine lenders (for a total of 53% in exit participation rights). In particular, as a result of the agreement, Norberto Ferretti, the Group's management and Mediobanca held the 100% of the Group's voting rights.

As of 2024, the Group's shareholding structure is divided between Ferretti International Holding (37.5%), Flipnation Limited (10%), Danilo Iervolino (5.2%), Kheope Sa (4.5%) and the market (42.6%).

== Main shareholders ==
The main shareholders of Ferretti on 22 July 2025 are:

Name	%
Market	43.890%
Shandong Sasac	37.541%
Valea Foundation	13.292%
Danilo Iervolino	5.277%

== Racing ==
Motivated by the needs for high tech synergy and greater international recognition, the company entered in 1989, into offshore racing. Norberto Ferretti won the Class 1 Offshore World Championship title in 1994.

The Ferretti team win the European Offshore Championship in 1995. In 1997, it won both European and World champion titles. The company attributes these winnings to a hi-tech hull designed with a carbon-fiber autoclave.

== Technology ==
Together with Mitsubishi the Ferretti group has developed a system called ARG (anti-rolling gyro), which reduces the effects of the waves on their boats, using a counterweight and a gyroscope.

== Notable customers ==
Notable Ferretti customers have included Richard Burton, Brigitte Bardot and Sophia Loren.
