= R50 =

R50 or R-50 may refer to:

== Automobiles ==
- BMW R50, a motorcycle
- Mini Hatch (R50), a hatchback
- Nissan Pathfinder (R50), a sport utility vehicle
- Toyota LiteAce (R50), a van
- Venucia R50, a hatchback
- Volkswagen Touareg R50, a sport utility vehicle

== Other uses ==
- R50 (South Africa), a road
- HMS Venus (R50), a destroyer of the Royal Navy
- R-50, the ASHRAE designation for methane as a refrigerant
- R50: Very toxic to aquatic organisms, a risk phrase
- R50, a commuter rail service on the Llobregat–Anoia Line, in Barcelona, Catalonia, Spain
- R50, a Ferris wheel designed by Ronald Bussink
- Canon EOS R50, crop-frame mirrorless camera
