= Venucia M50V =

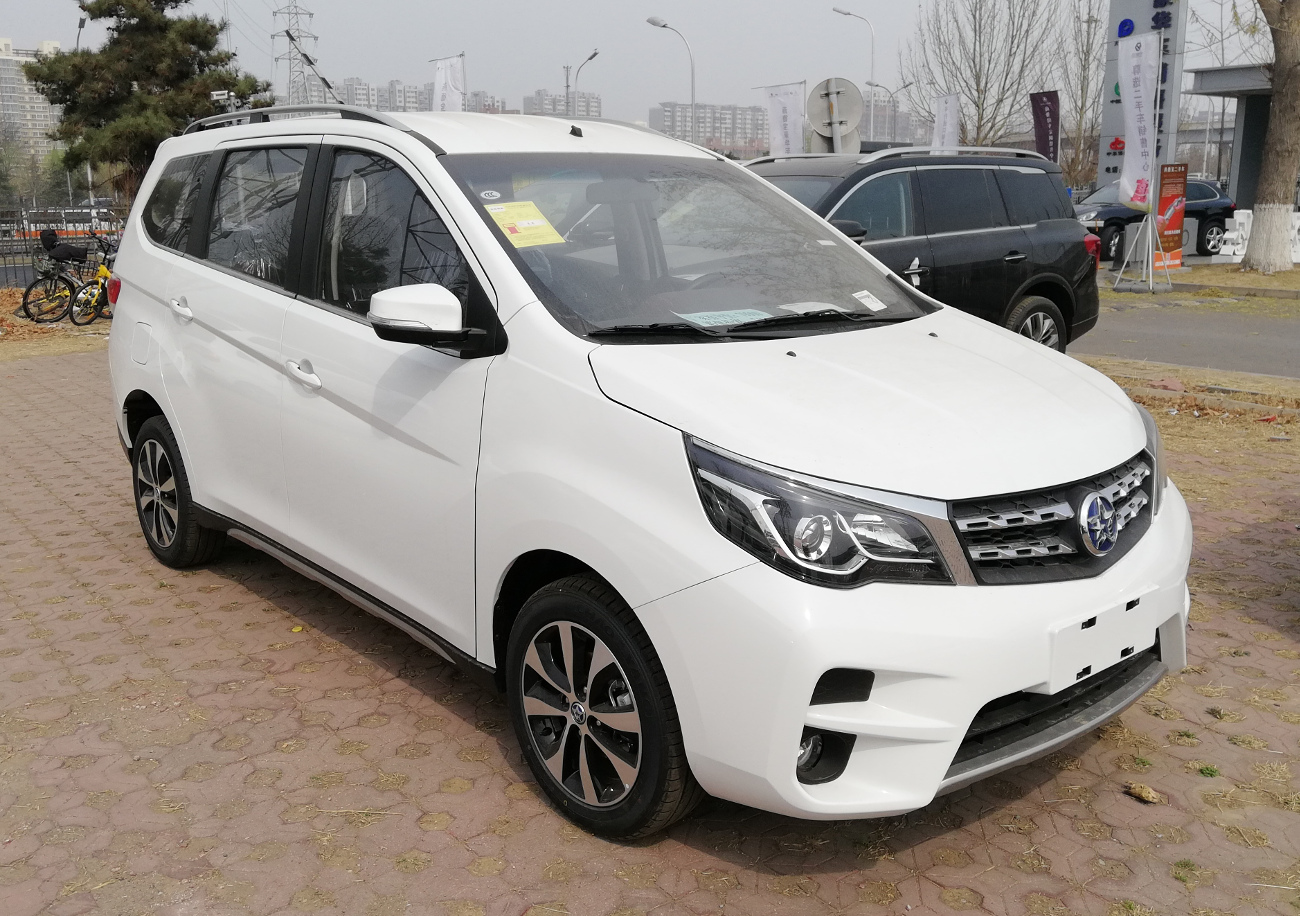
- Venucia M50V

Overview
- Manufacturer: Venucia (Dongfeng Nissan)
- Production: 2016–2020
- Model years: 2017–2020

Body and chassis
- Related: Dongfeng Fengguang 360

Powertrain
- Engine: 1.5 L I4; 1.6 L I4
- Transmission: 5-speed manual CVT

Dimensions
- Wheelbase: 2,750 mm (108.3 in)
- Length: 4,501 mm (177.2 in)
- Width: 1,726 mm (68.0 in)
- Height: 1,780 mm (70.1 in)
- Curb weight: 1,260–1,309 kg (2,778–2,886 lb)

The Venucia M50V is a compact MPV produced since 2016 by Chinese auto maker Venucia, a subsidiary of Dongfeng Motor Co., Ltd.

== Overview ==
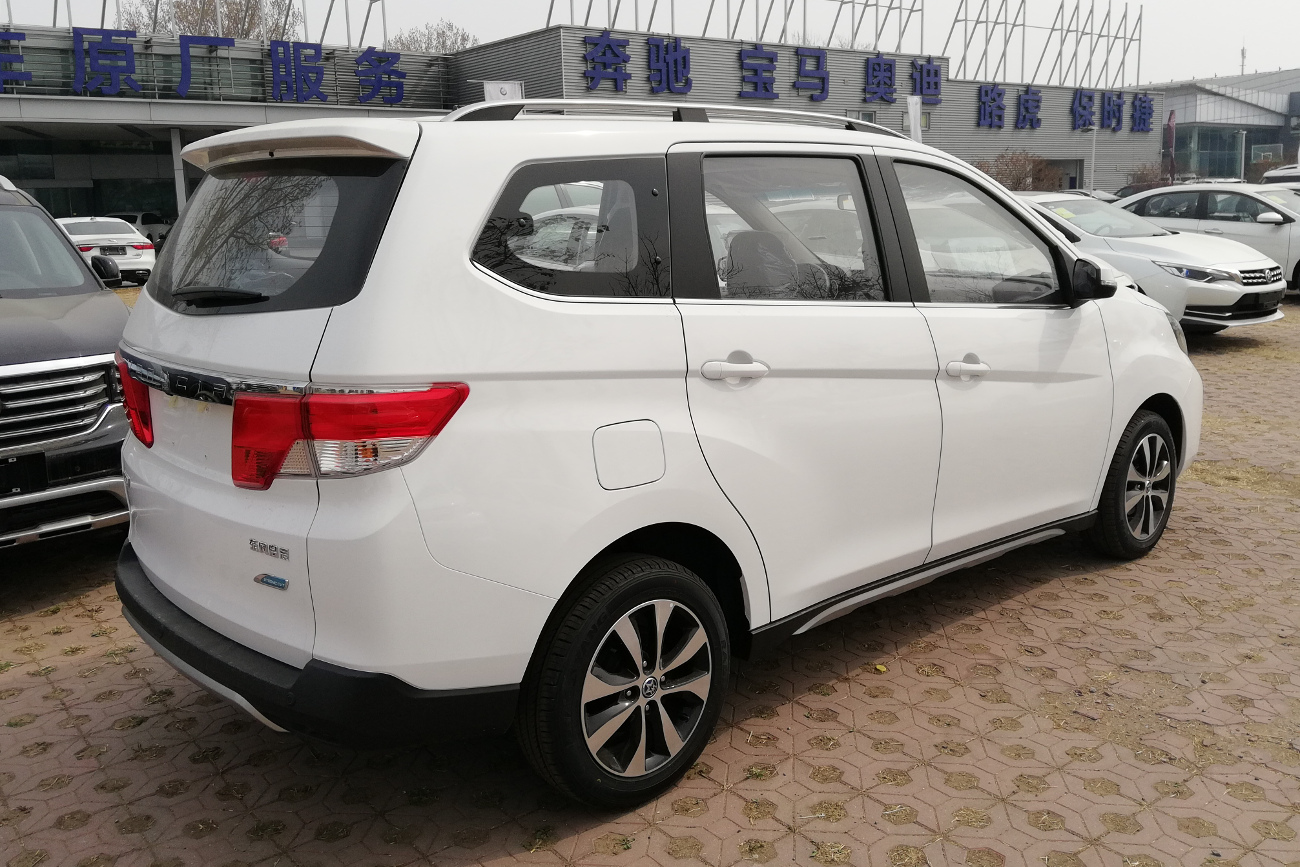
Venucia M50V rear

The Venucia M50V debuted on the 2017 Shanghai Auto Show in April 2017 and was launched on the Chinese car market in late 2017 as Venucia's first entry into the MPV market. The M50V shares its underpinnings with the Dongfeng Fengguang 360 MPV while being positioned slightly upmarket than the Fengguang 360 with prices starting from 65,800 yuan to 84,900 yuan.
