= Venucia T90 =

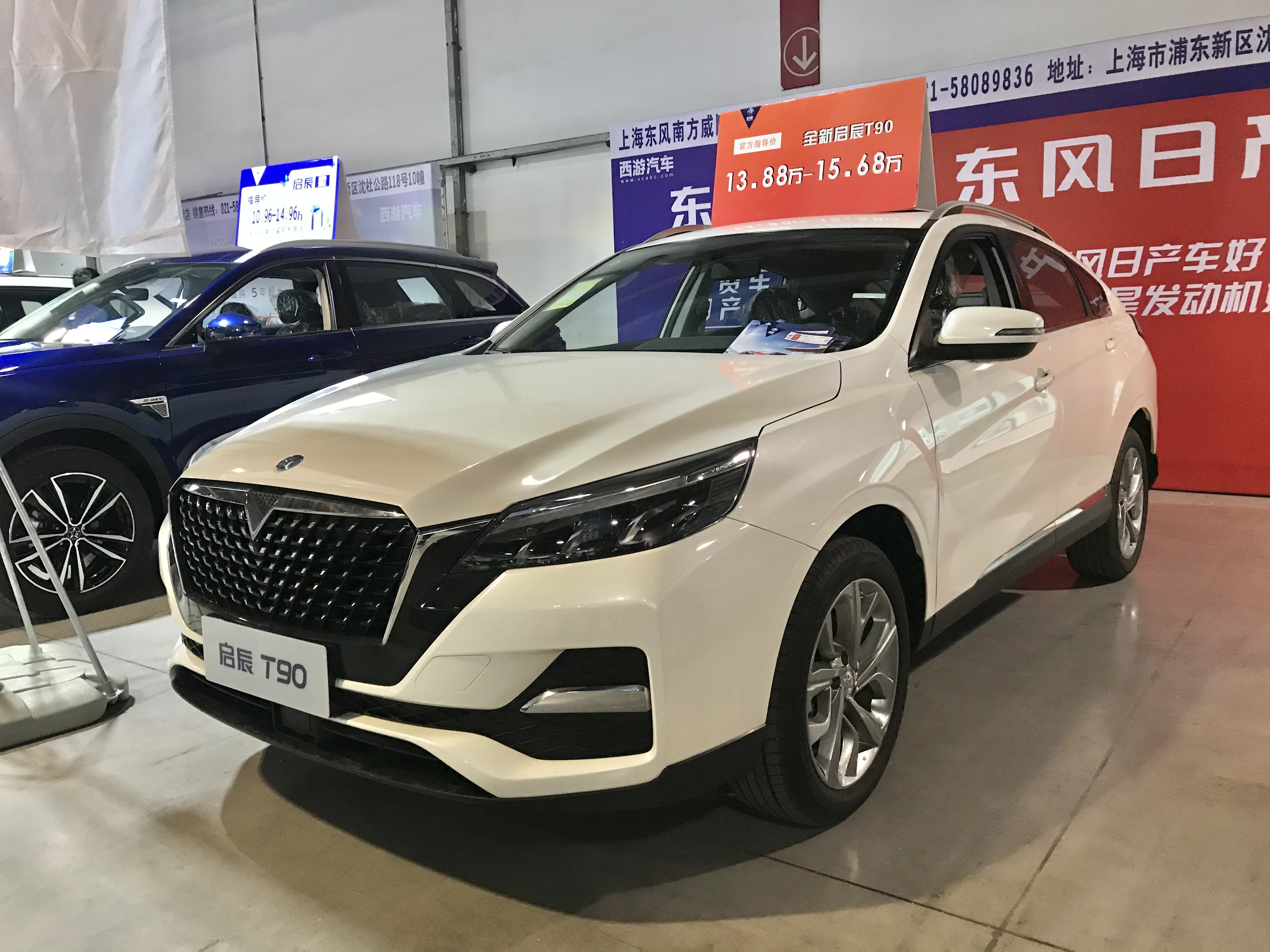
- Venucia T90 2020 facelift

Overview
- Manufacturer: Venucia (Dongfeng Nissan)
- Production: 2016–2022
- Model years: 2017–2022
- Assembly: Wuhan, China

Body and chassis
- Class: Mid-size CUV
- Body style: 5-door CUV
- Layout: Front-engine, front-wheel-drive
- Platform: Nissan D platform
- Related: Nissan Murano

Powertrain
- Engine: 2.5 L I4 gasoline); 2.5 L I4 hybrid
- Transmission: CVT

Dimensions
- Wheelbase: 2,765 mm (108.9 in)
- Length: 4,793 mm (188.7 in)
- Width: 1,865 mm (73.4 in)
- Height: 1,592 mm (62.7 in)

The Venucia T90 is a fastback Mid-size CUV produced by Venucia, a subsidiary of Dongfeng Motor Co., Ltd.

== Overview ==
The Venucia T90 was previewed by the 2015 Venucia Vow concept during the 2015 Shanghai Auto Show in China and a pre-production concept on the 2016 Beijing Auto Show.

The production version of the Venucia T90 was launched on the 2016 Chengdu Auto Show in China in September 2016, and was available to the Chinese auto market in December 2016 as the new flagship of the Venucia brand at the time with prices ranging from 109,800 yuan to 154,800 yuan. The T90 is powered by a Nissan-sourced 2.0 liter four-cylinder petrol engine producing 144 hp and 198 nm, mated to a six-speed manual transmission or a Xtronic CVT, with a 1.4-liter turbo engine added to the option list later. Venucia claims a 180 km/h top speed and a 0-100 in 12.4 seconds. As with most Venucia models, the production of the Venucia T90 is based on the same platform as a Nissan product: the Nissan Murano, launched in 2015.

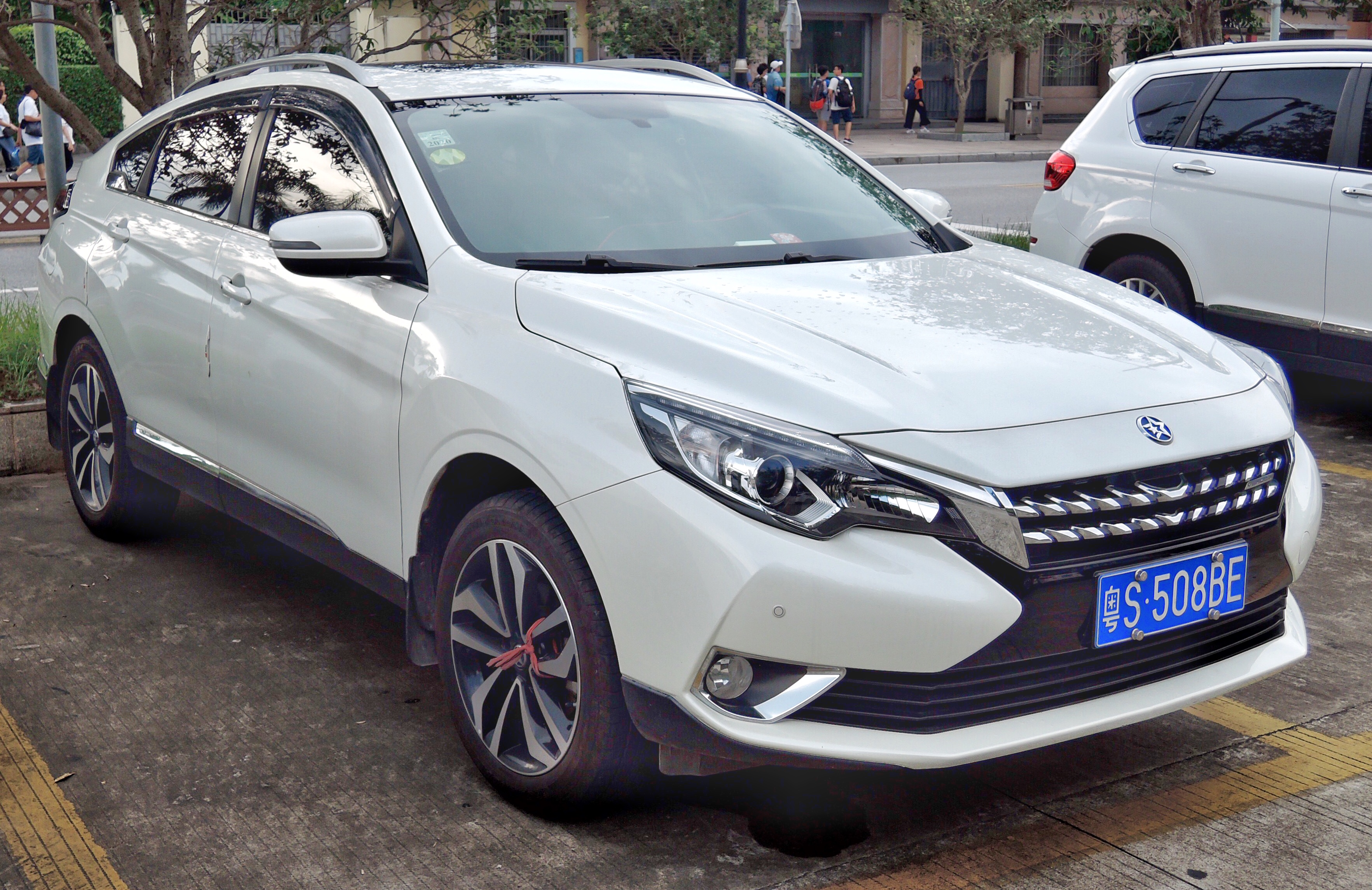
Venucia T90 pre-facelift

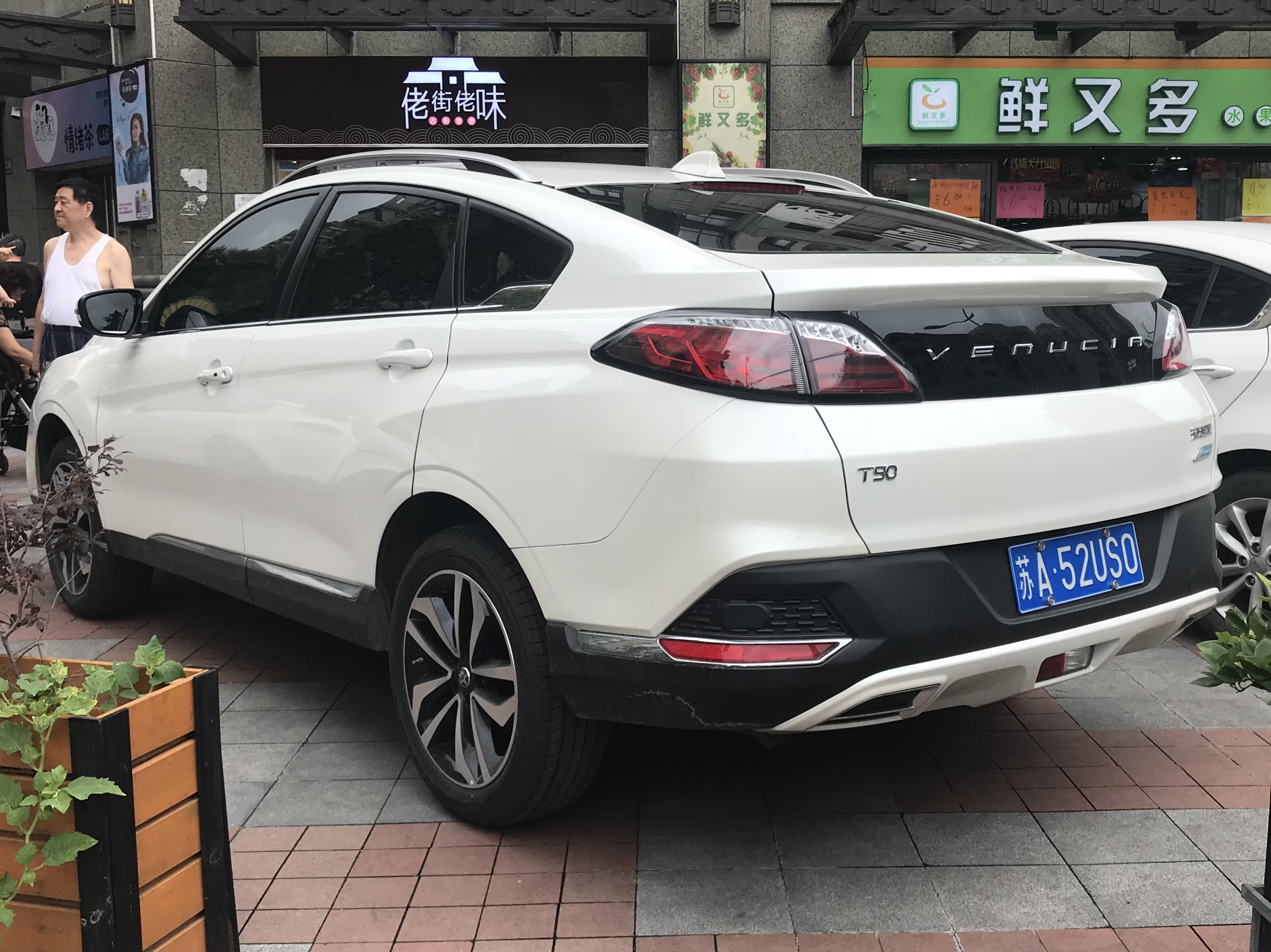
Venucia T90 pre-facelift (rear)

=== 2020 facelift ===
Venucia rolled out the 2020 model year update of the T90 crossover in September 2019. The updated model received exterior, cabin, and tech improvements. The 2020 model features redesigned front and rear in the same style as the updated D60 sedan. The updated interior IP houses a digital dashboard, a multimedia system with extended functionality, and a sensor-based climate control unit. The engine range for the 2020 model year has also been revised. The 1.4-liter turbo engine was cancelled, while adding an enhanced 2.0-liter naturally aspirated V4 engine producing 150 hp (112 kW) and 205 Nm (151 lb-ft) of torque mated to a CVT.

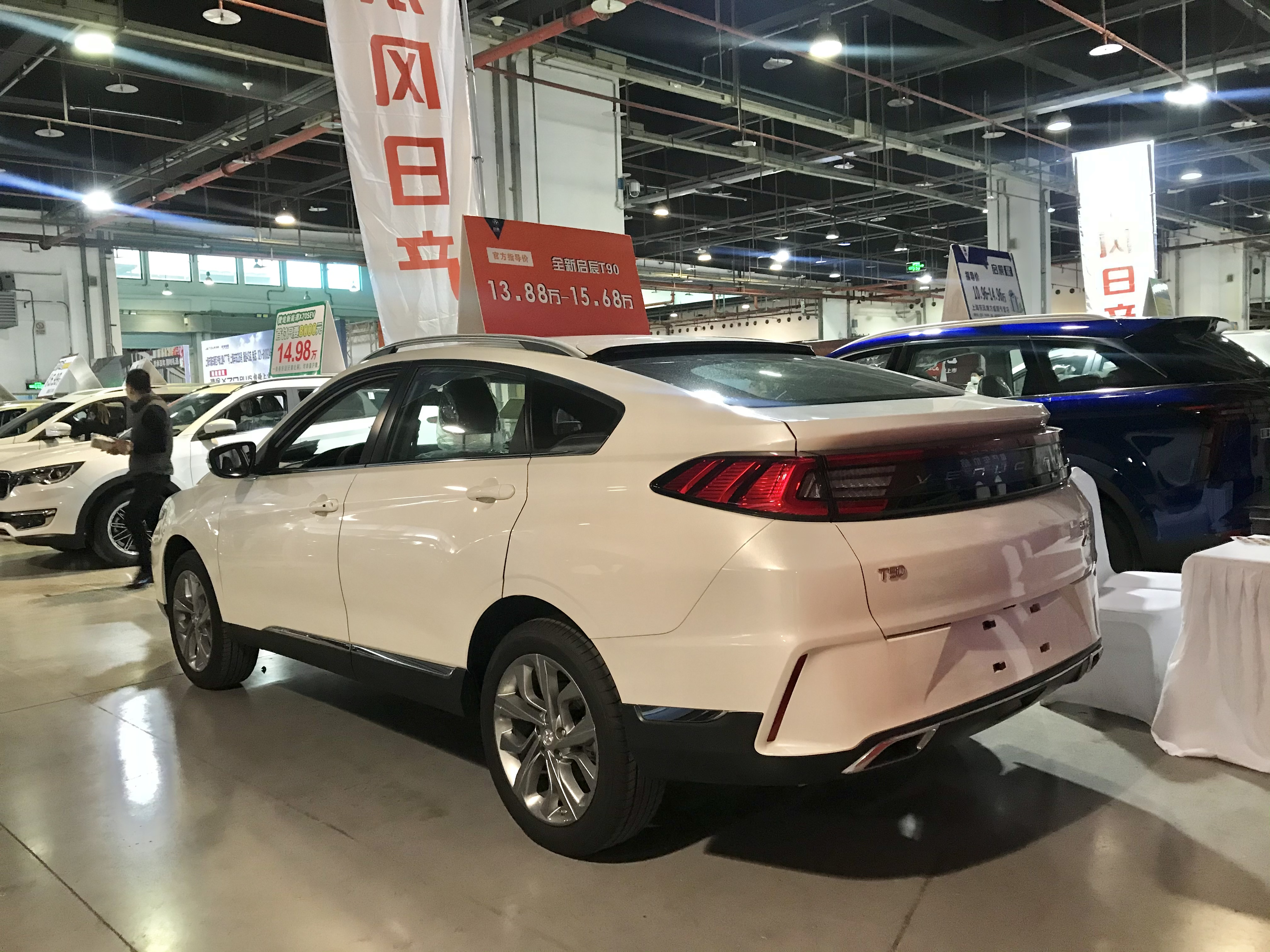
Venucia T90 2020 facelift
