= Venucia e30 =

Venucia e30 is a nameplate used for two different vehicles sold in China.

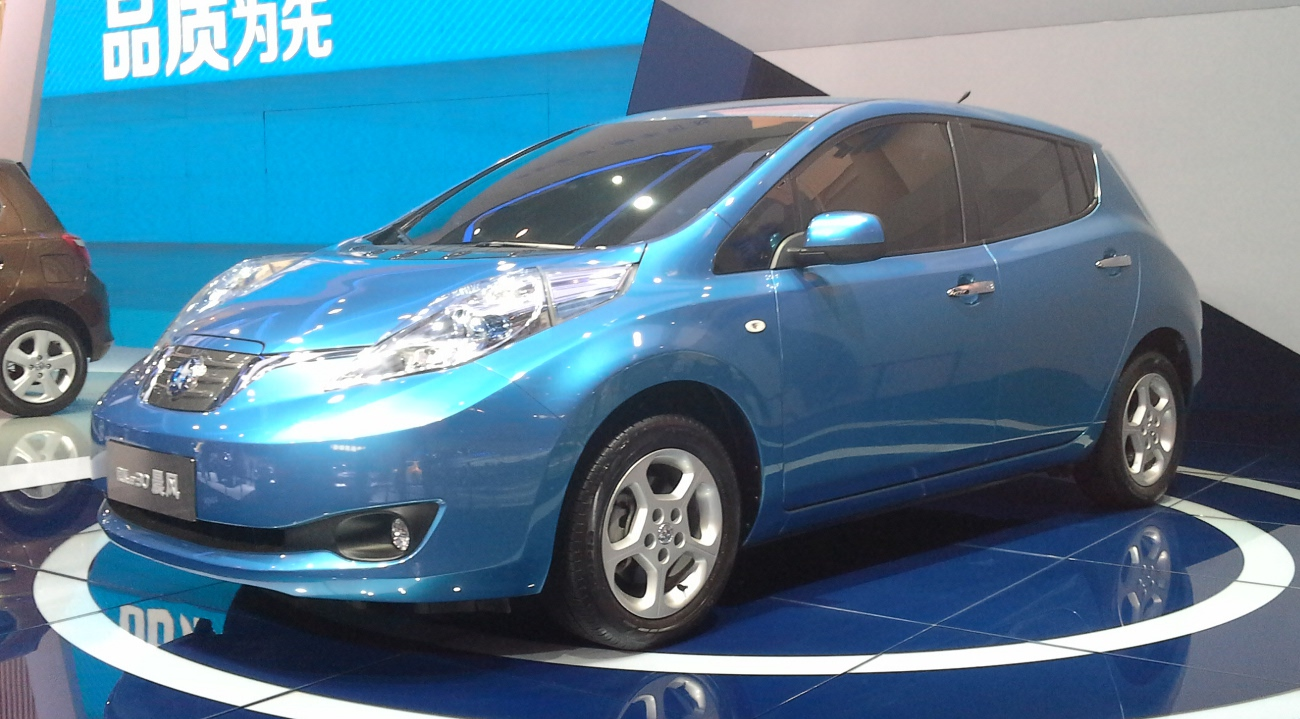
First generation

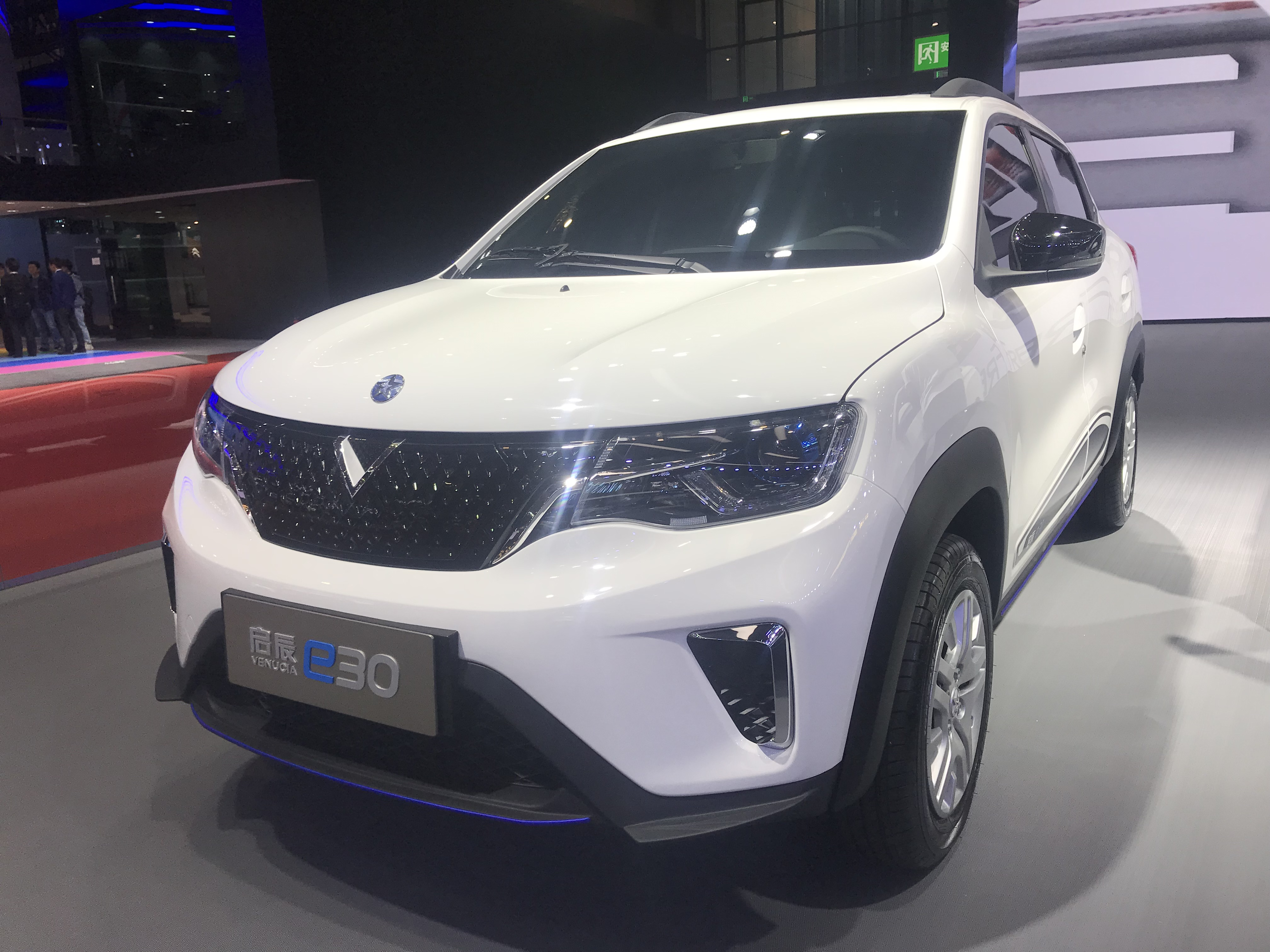
Second generation

Vehicles using the nameplate are:

- First generation Venucia e30, a rebadged first generation Nissan Leaf.
- Second generation Venucia e30, a rebadged Renault City K-ZE.
