= Venucia VX6 =

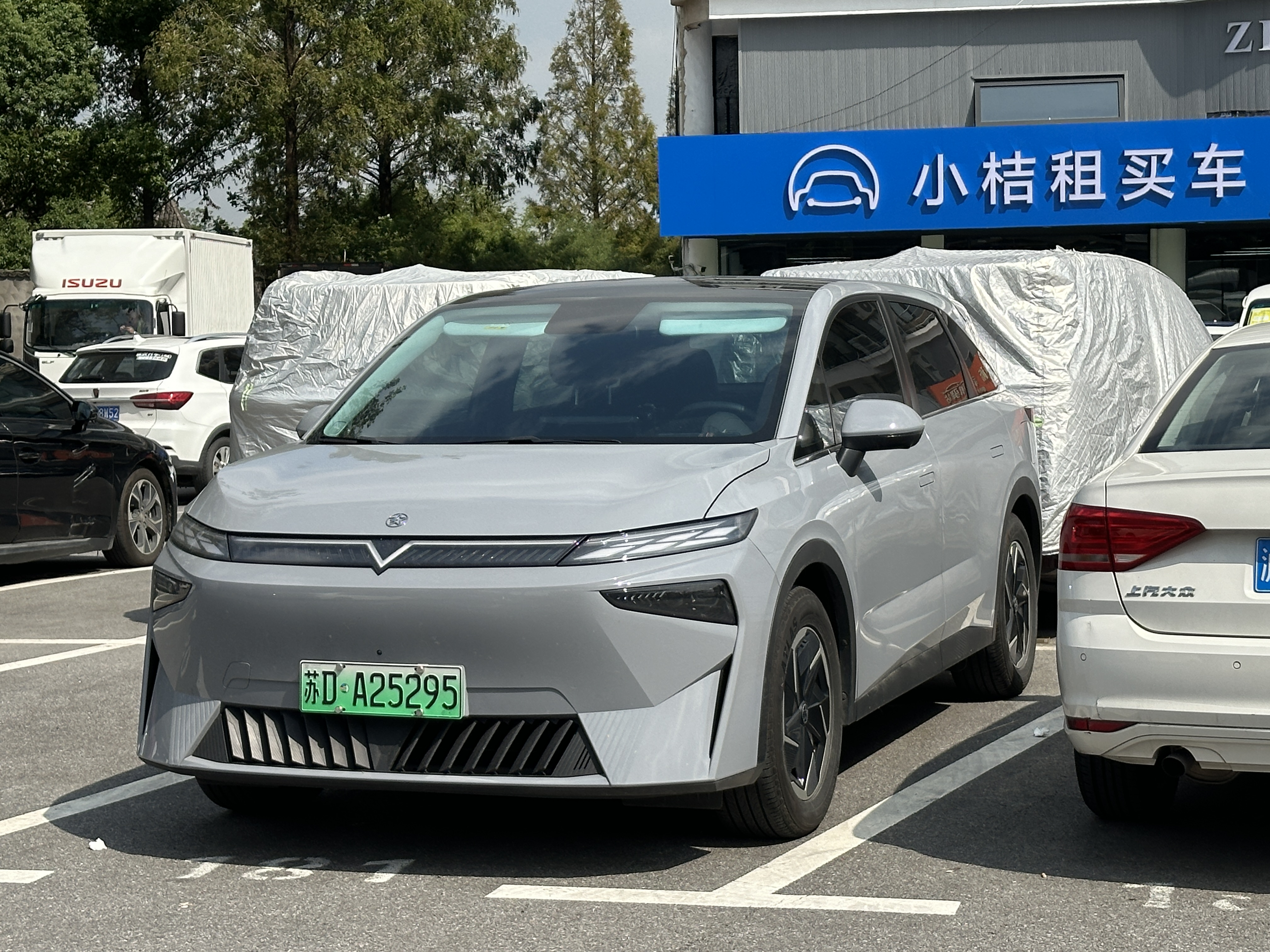

Overview
- Manufacturer: Venucia (Dongfeng Nissan)
- Production: 2023–present
- Assembly: China: Guangzhou

Body and chassis
- Class: Compact crossover SUV
- Body style: 4-door SUV
- Layout: Front-engine, front-wheel-drive
- Platform: V-π electric vehicle chassis

Powertrain
- Power output: 160 kW

Dimensions
- Wheelbase: 2,850 mm (112.2 in)
- Length: 4,658 mm (183.4 in)
- Width: 1,890 mm (74.4 in)
- Height: 1,656 mm (65.2 in)
- Curb weight: 1,821 kg (4,014.6 lb)

The Venucia VX6 is an electric compact crossover SUV produced by Venucia, a subsidiary of the Dongfeng Nissan joint venture.

== History ==
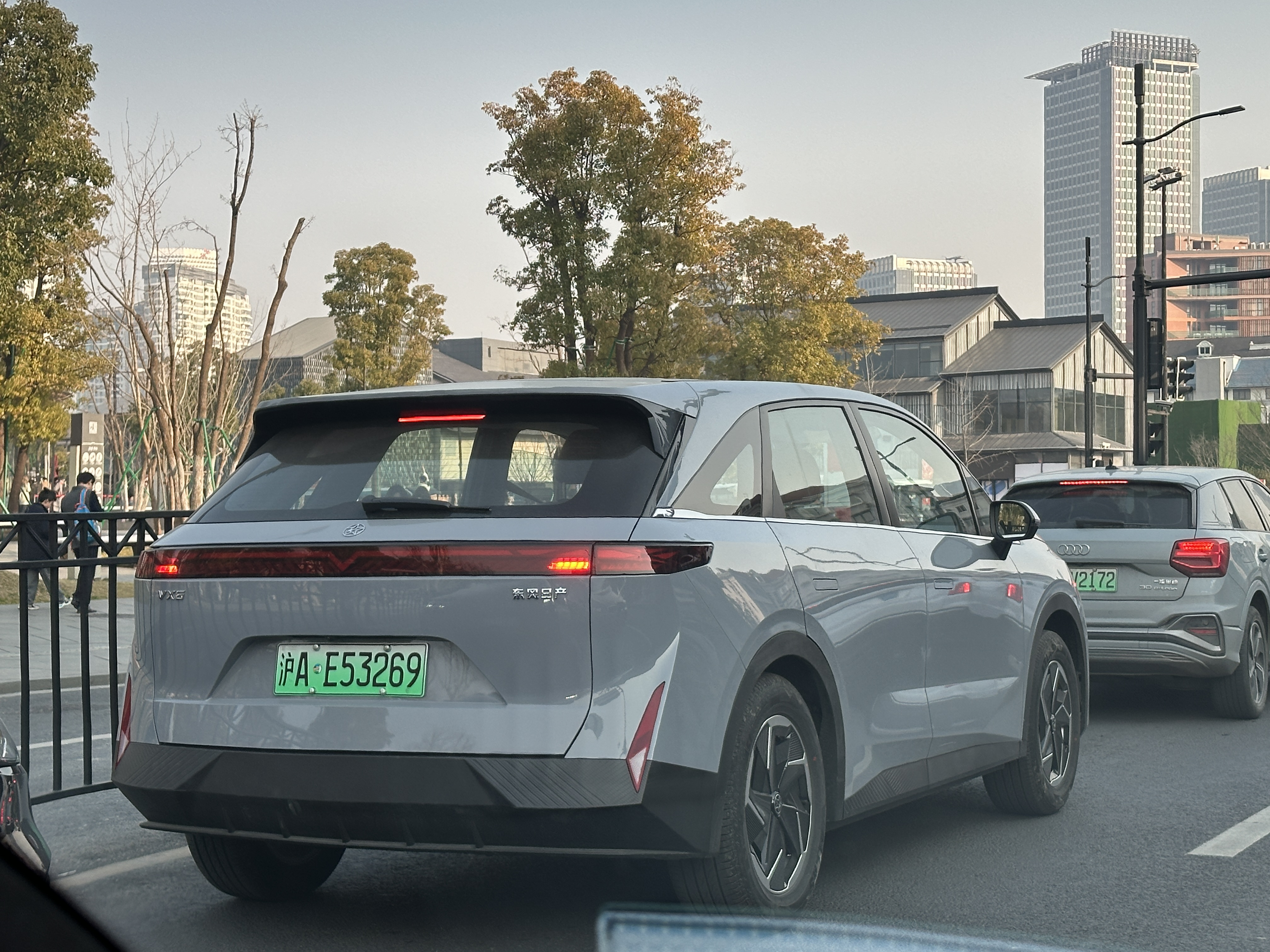
Venucia VX6 rear

The Venucia VX6 was previewed by the Venucia Ve concept at the 2022 Guangzhou Auto Show in December 2022. The VX6 is the first electric compact of the Venucia brand and is based on Dongfeng-Nissan's dedicated electric vehicle chassis V-π. The V-π electric vehicle chassis presented in May 2022 features a cell-to-chassis design. The design integrates an X-in-1 integrated electric drive, a coupled thermal management system, a front double-wishbone and rear five-link suspension setup, and an 800V power battery system. It has been on sale in mainland China since November 2023.

== Technical specifications ==
The VX6 is powered by a single electric motor powering the front wheels with a maximum power output of 160 kW and a peak torque of 275 Nm. The VX6 is equipped with a 62 kilowatt hours battery pack with a CLTC range of 520 kilometers.

== Sales ==
Year	China
2023	1,274
2024	10,709
2025	9,407
