= Venucia =

Chinese automotive company

- Product type: Car marque
- Current owner: Dongfeng Nissan Passenger Vehicle Co, Ltd.
- Country: China
- Introduced: September 2010; 16 years ago
- Markets: China
- Previous owners: Dongfeng Nissan Passenger Vehicle Co, Ltd.; Dongfeng Venucia Motor Company
- Ambassador: Tao Yu (Brand Executive Director)
- Website: Official website

Chinese name
- Simplified Chinese: 启辰
- Traditional Chinese: 啟辰
- Literal meaning: Morning star; Beginning of a new day
Transcriptions
Standard Mandarin
- Hanyu Pinyin: Qǐ Chén
- Wade–Giles: Ch'i^{3} Ch'en^{2}
- IPA: [tɕʰì tʂʰə̌n]
Wu
- Romanization: Chi^{上} zen^{平}
Yue: Cantonese
- Yale Romanization: Kái sàhn
- Jyutping: Kai2 san4
- IPA: [kʰɐ̌i sɐ̏n]

Dongfeng Venucia Motor Company
- Native name: 东风启辰汽车公司
- Type: Subsidiary
- Industry: Automotive
- Predecessor: Venucia marque division of Dongfeng Nissan
- Founded: 7 February 2017
- Defunct: December 2020
- Fate: Merged back into Dongfeng Nissan
- Headquarters: Wuhan, China
- Area served: China
- Key people: Ma Lei (General Manager)
- Products: Cars
- Production output: ▼109,092 (2019)
- Parent: Dongfeng Motor Co., Ltd.

Venucia is a car marque of Dongfeng Nissan Passenger Vehicle Company (Dongfeng Nissan), a subsidiary of Dongfeng Motor Co., Ltd. The marque was launched in September 2010 by Dongfeng Nissan. From February 2017 until the end of 2020, Venucia was spun off from Dongfeng Nissan as a separate Dongfeng Motor Co., Ltd. subsidiary focused on the marketing and production of cars, with the name Dongfeng Venucia Motor Company. (Note: The company name was also translated as Dongfeng Venucia Vehicle Company.) In December 2020, Dongfeng Motor Co., Ltd announced it would merge Venucia back into Dongfeng Nissan.

== History ==
In September 2010 Dongfeng Nissan unveiled a new marque, Venucia, to be used to sell vehicles developed and designed by the company in China specifically for the domestic market.

In November 2011 Dongfeng Nissan announced that the first car to be sold under the Venucia marque would be the D50 mid-class saloon, and that it would go on sale in the first half of 2012.

Dongfeng Nissan unveiled a production version of the Venucia e30 electric car at the 2012 Auto Guangzhou motor show. An earlier version, the Venucia E-Concept was unveiled at the 2012 Beijing Auto Show. Initially, the electric car was scheduled for production in China by 2015, and it has the same bodywork, dimensions, electric-drive specifications and shares other features of the Nissan Leaf. Dongfeng Nissan planned to start a pilot project in 15 Chinese cities to promote Venucia e30 jointly with local governments. A total of 216 units were delivered through December 2013. These units are being marketed as Venucia Morning Wind and they are rebadged Leafs since local production has not begun yet. In April 2014 Dongfeng Nissan announced that retail sales of the Venucia e30 were scheduled to begin in September 2014.

Dongfeng Nissan launched its second production model, the R50 five-door mid-size hatchback car, in September 2012. The R50 was designed in China and is aimed at first-time buyers.

The Venucia Viwa concept car was unveiled at the Shanghai Auto Show in April 2013, previewing a new production car based on the platform of the Nissan March. The R30 was subsequently launched in 2014.

In its first two years of sales (2012–2014), Nissan claimed 200,000 Venucia cars had been sold.

In January 2015, the T70 was launched, a compact SUV based on the Nissan Qashqai.

In February 2017, Venucia was spun off as a separate subsidiary of Dongfeng Motor Co., Ltd. That same year, the company introduced a new compact saloon, the D60, which was the first vehicle incorporating a new design style for the Venucia marque. From 2018 onwards, the company has been launching electric versions of its internal combustion engine-powered models.

In late 2019, Dongfeng Venucia announced the introduction of the Star (Chinese: 星; pinyin: Xīng), a small crossover. Sales started in early 2020. The Star was the first to have the "Galaxy-V" marque styling. It was also the first to be built on the Venucia Smart Arquitecture (VSA), a modular system allowing Dongfeng Venucia more localisation for platforms while also facilitating the fitting of components from the different Renault–Nissan–Mitsubishi Alliance companies.

In December 2020, Dongfeng Motor Co., Ltd. announced a company reorganisation as part of which it would merge back Venucia into Dongfeng Nissan.

== Design and manufacturing ==
At first, Venucia's cars were designed directly by Dongfeng Nissan. In 2014, the company announced it would establish a separate facility in Guangzhou aimed exclusively at designing Venucias, called Venucia Design Centre, which was opened in June 2016. In April 2018, Dongfeng Venucia opened an advanced design centre in Shanghai.

The Venucia vehicles are assembled at plants located in Guangzhou and Zhengzhou.

== Marketing ==
The first marque slogan for Venucia was "reading the world in a pleased China" (Chinese: 阅世界，悦中国; pinyin: Yuè shìjiè, yuè zhōngguó). At the 2013 Auto Guangzhou, the marque introduced a second slogan, "vibrant life, within reach" (Chinese: 多彩生活•触手可及; pinyin: Duōcǎi shēnghuó•chùshǒu kě jí). There also was an English-language slogan, "enjoy more". In 2017, the Venucia company introduced the English-language slogan "Better for Better" and the Chinese-language slogan "ingenious craftsmanship, going with you" (Chinese: 匠心匠品，与你同行; pinyin: Jiàngxīn jiàng pǐn, yǔ nǐ tóngxíng). That same year, the company unveiled a revised marque logo, replacing the original five stars on a deep blue background for a similar but simpler design.

In February 2014, Venucia agreed to sponsor the Guangzhou Hengda until January 2016, with the club promoting Venucia's model line-up. The sponsorship ended in December 2015, after Dongfeng Nissan sued the Guangzhou Hengda for breach of contract because the club allegedly did not include Venucia advert on the team kit as agreed. The Guangzhou Huadu District Court ruled in favour of Dongfeng Nissan.

In June 2015, Venucia sponsored the International Vertical Marathon. In January 2019, Dongfeng Venucia signed an official sponsorship agreement for the 2019 FIBA Basketball World Cup.

Up to early 2020, all Venucia models were marketed with alphanumerical designations (a letter and two numbers). The Venucia Star was the first with only an alphabetical name.

== Products ==
The following Venucia vehicles are currently available in China:

- D60, four-door compact sedan (2017–present)
- Star, compact CUV (2020–present)
- V-Online, compact CUV (2021–present)
- T60, subcompact five-door CUV (2019–present)
- VX6, five-door compact electric SUV (2023–present)
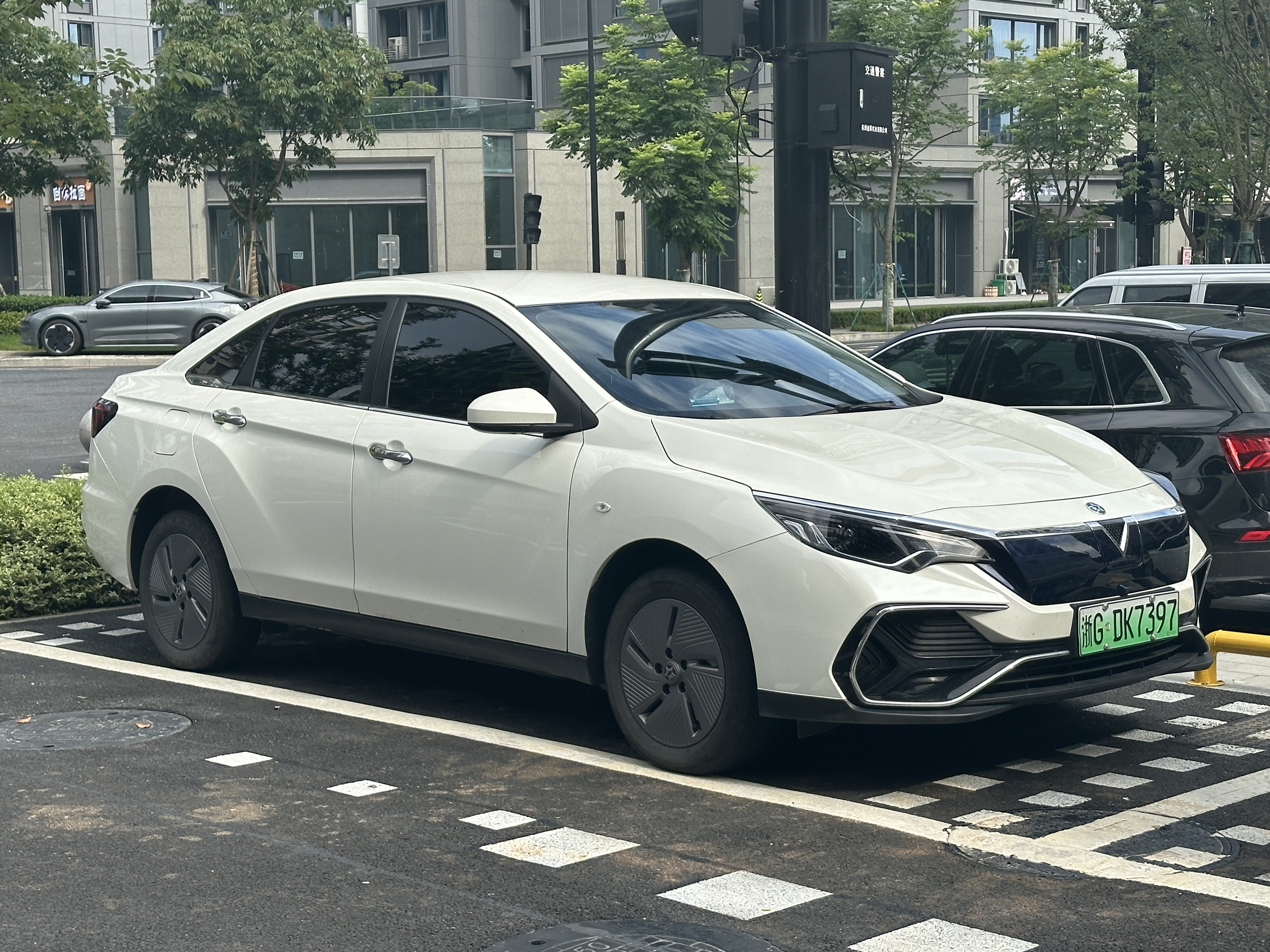
Venucia D60 EV

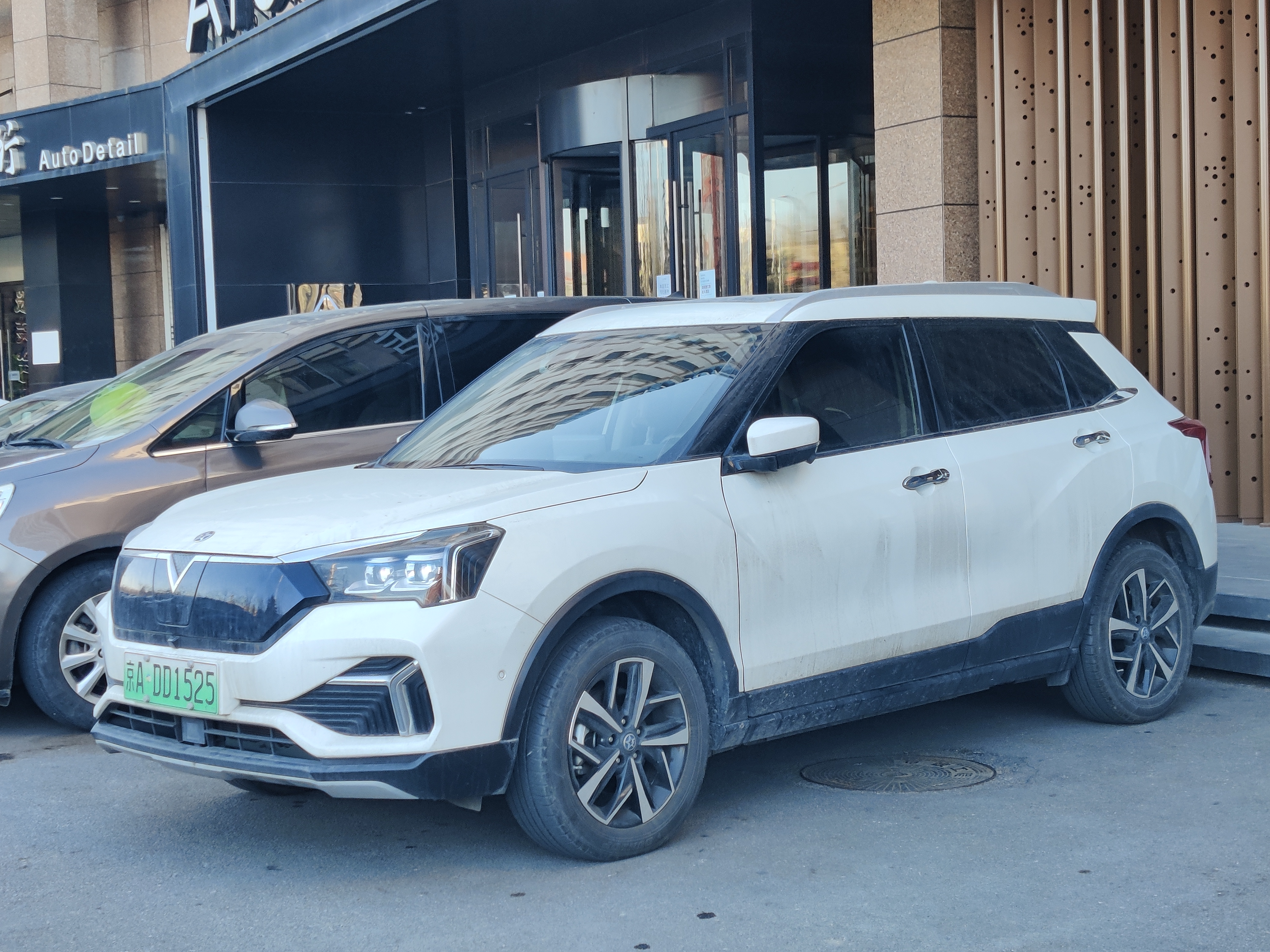
Venucia T60 EV

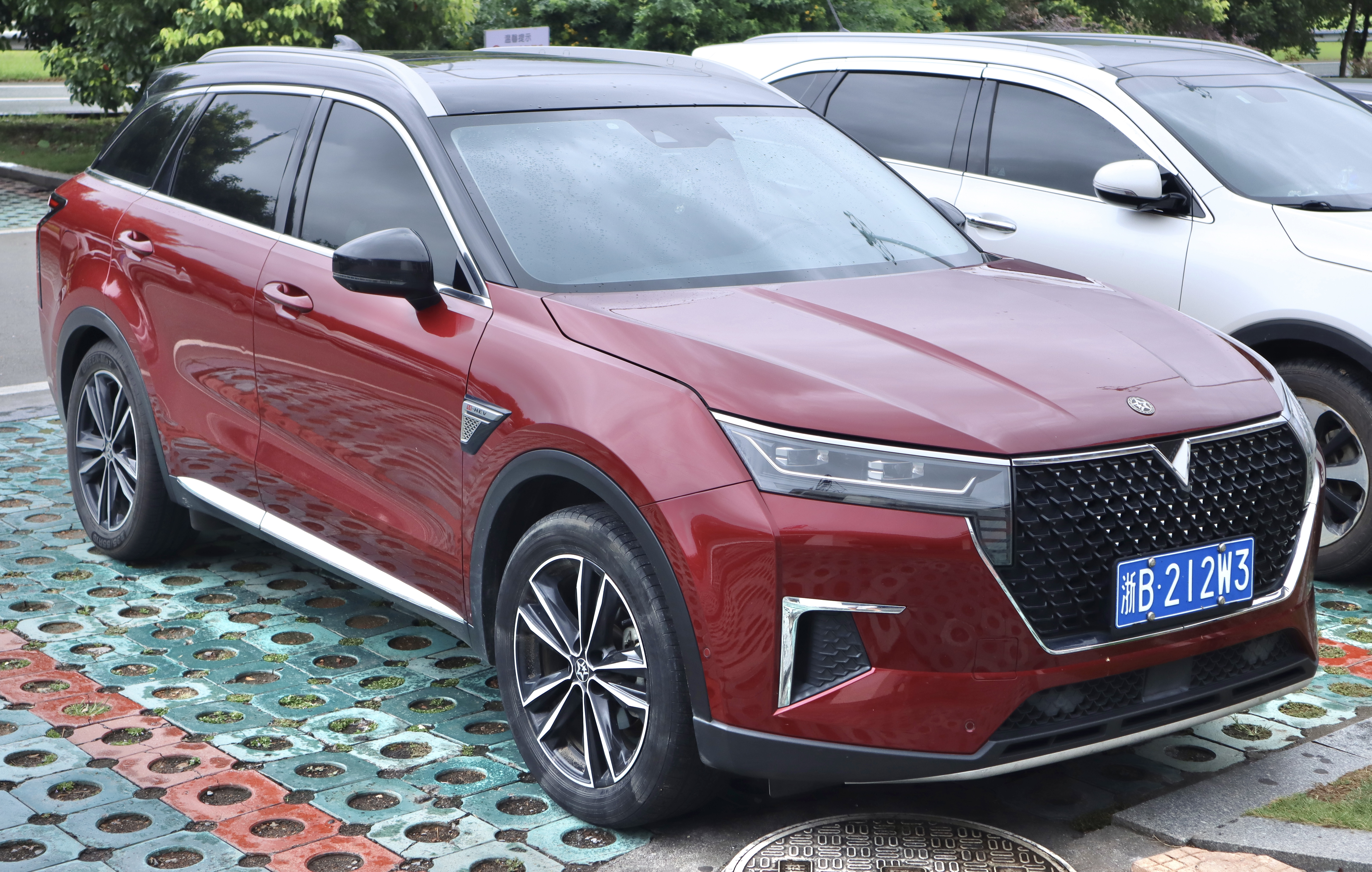
Venucia Xing (Star)

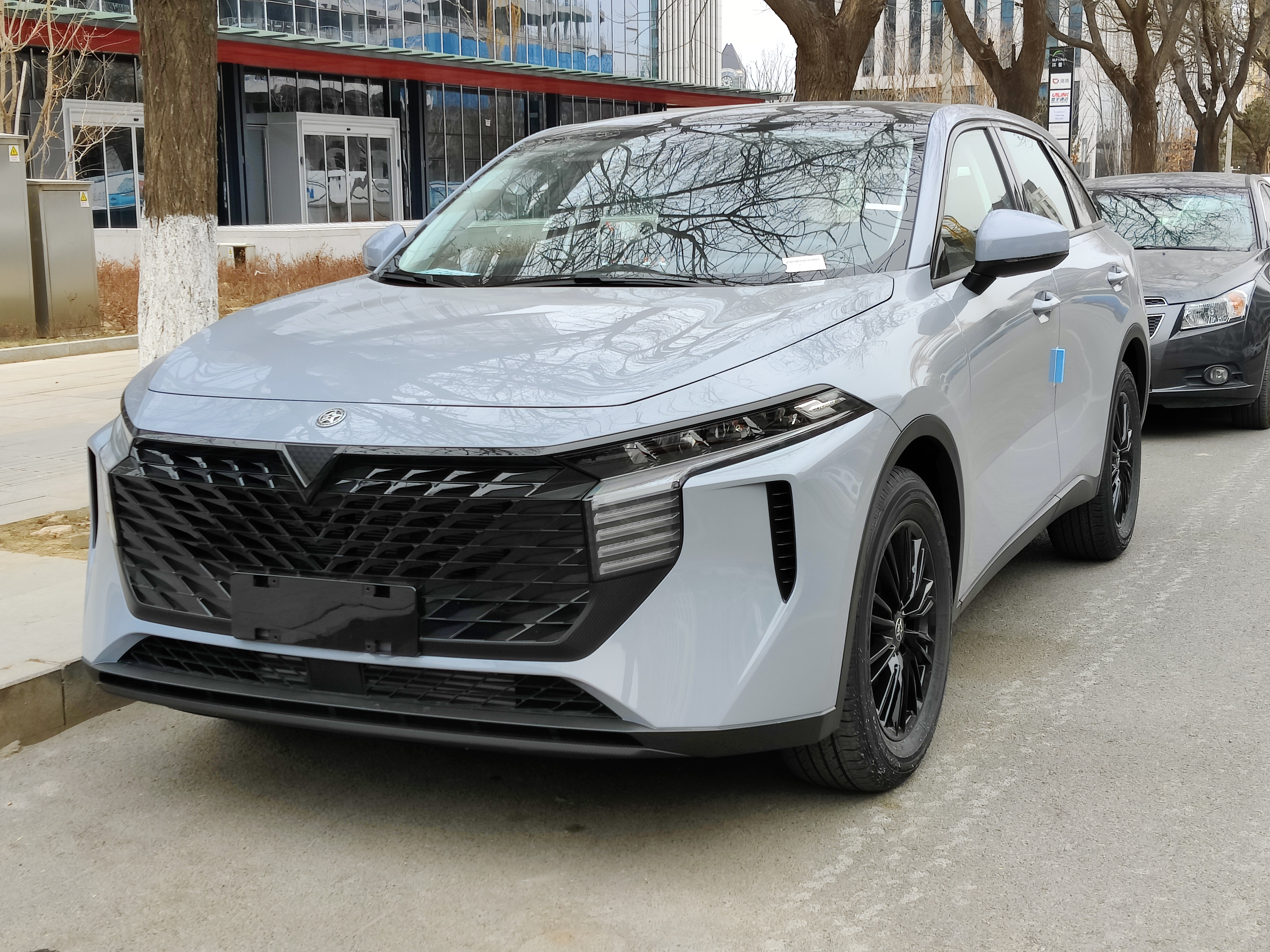
Venucia V-Online

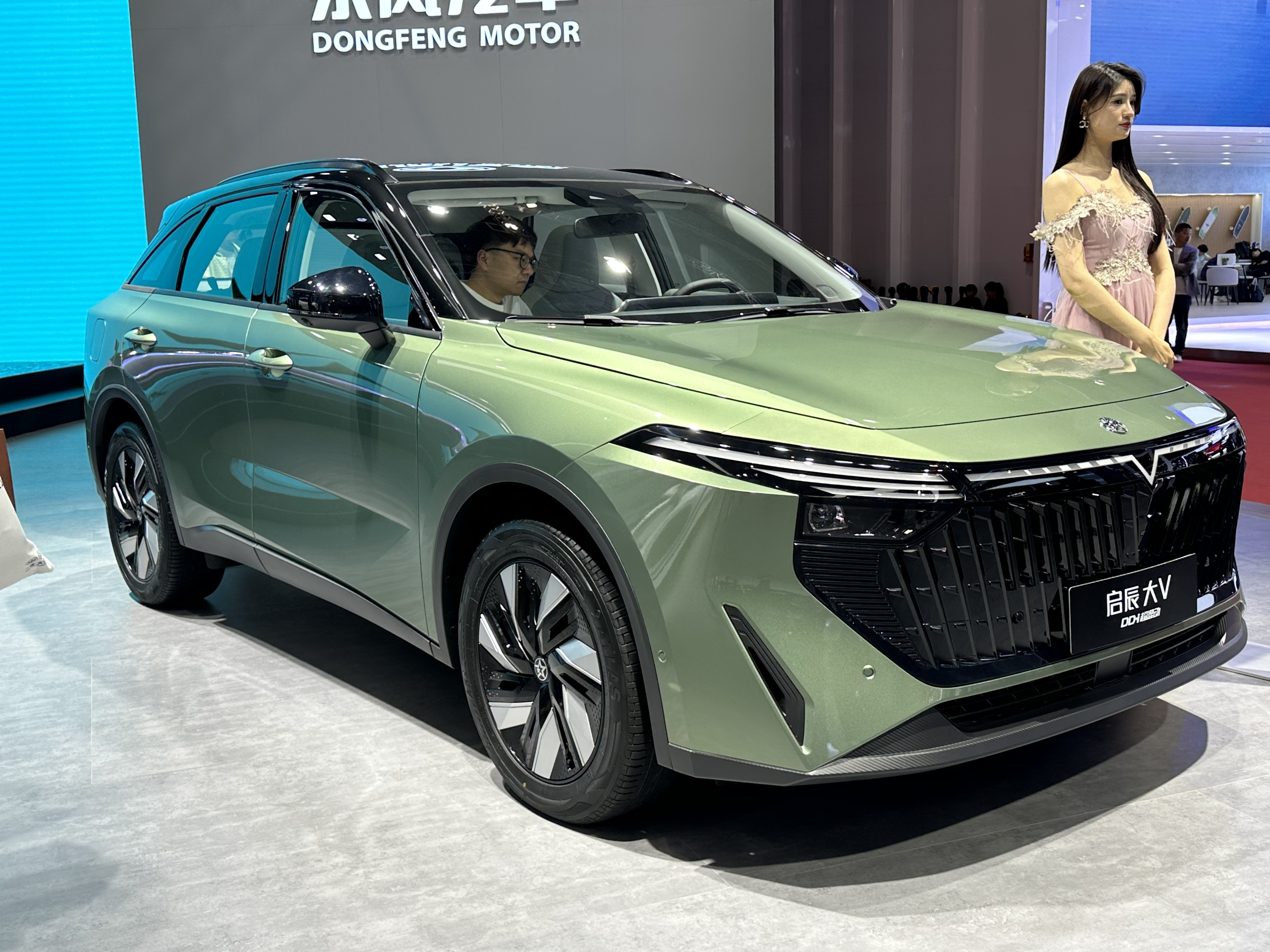
Venucia V-Online DD-i

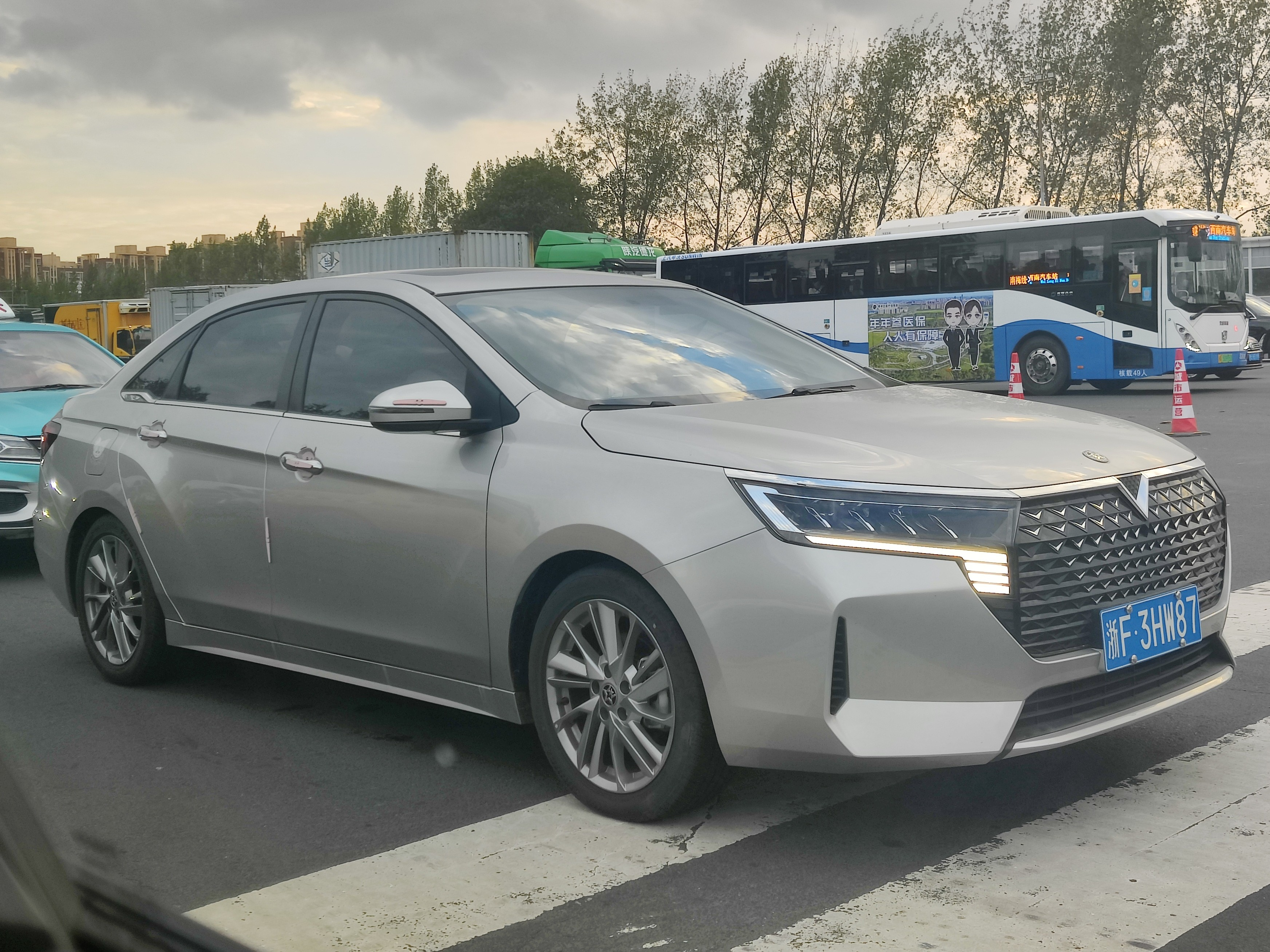
Venucia D60

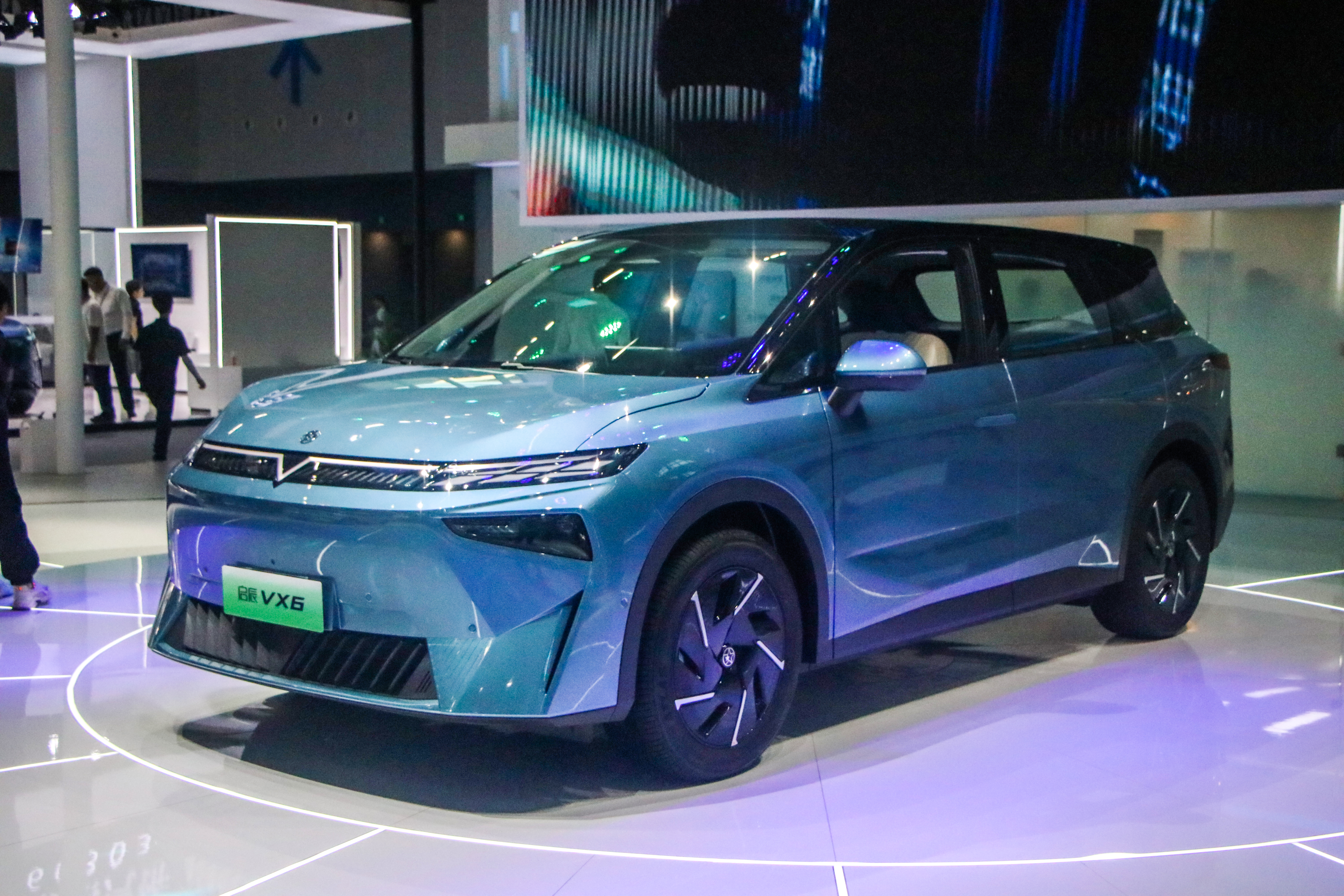
Venucia VX6

The following Venucia vehicles are discontinued products:

- e30, EV based on Nissan Leaf (2015–2017), EV based on Renault City K-ZE (2019–2023)
- R30, five-door supermini (2014–2017)
- R50, five-door subcompact hatchback (2012–2017) based on the Nissan Tiida hatchback
- R50X, AWD raised hatchback (2013–2017) based on the Nissan Tiida hatchback
- D50, four-door subcompact saloon car (2012–2017) based on the Nissan Tiida sedan
- M50V, MPV (2016–2020)
- T70X, raised AWD compact five-door CUV (2015–2017)
- T70, five-door compact CUV (2014–2020)
- T90, 3-row mid-size fastback CUV (2016–2022)
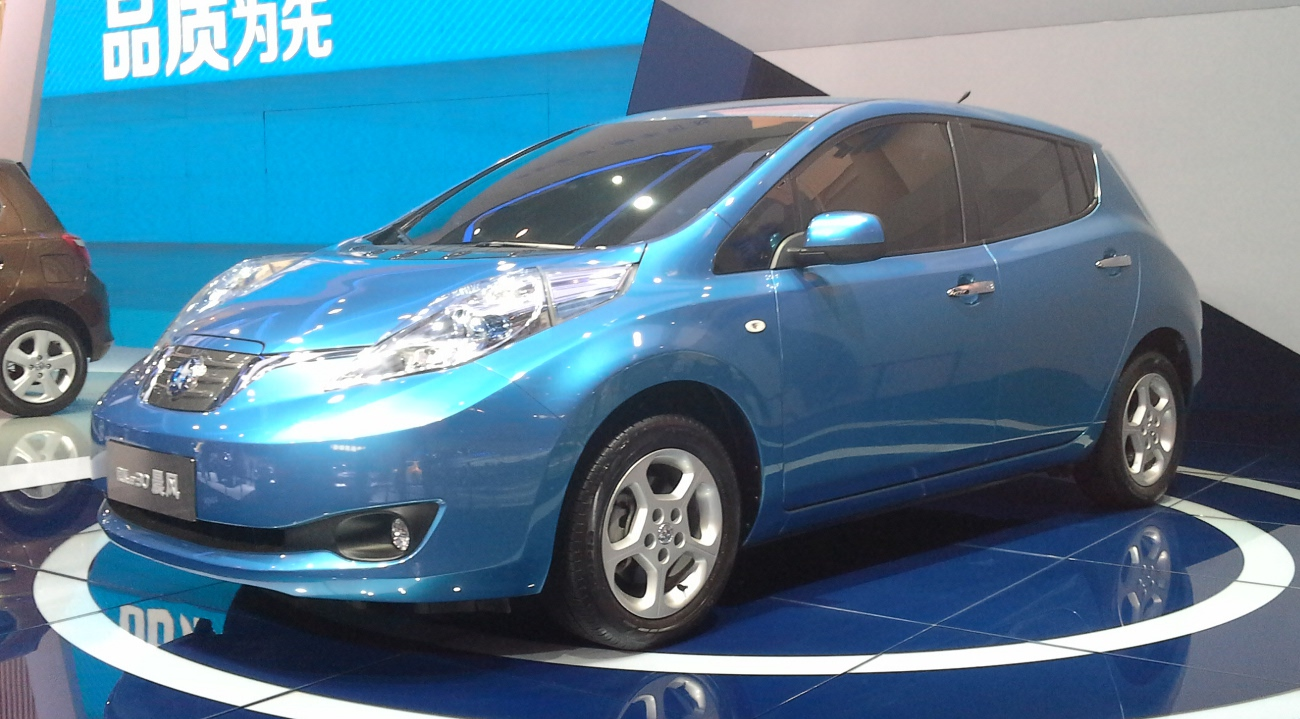
Venucia e30 EV

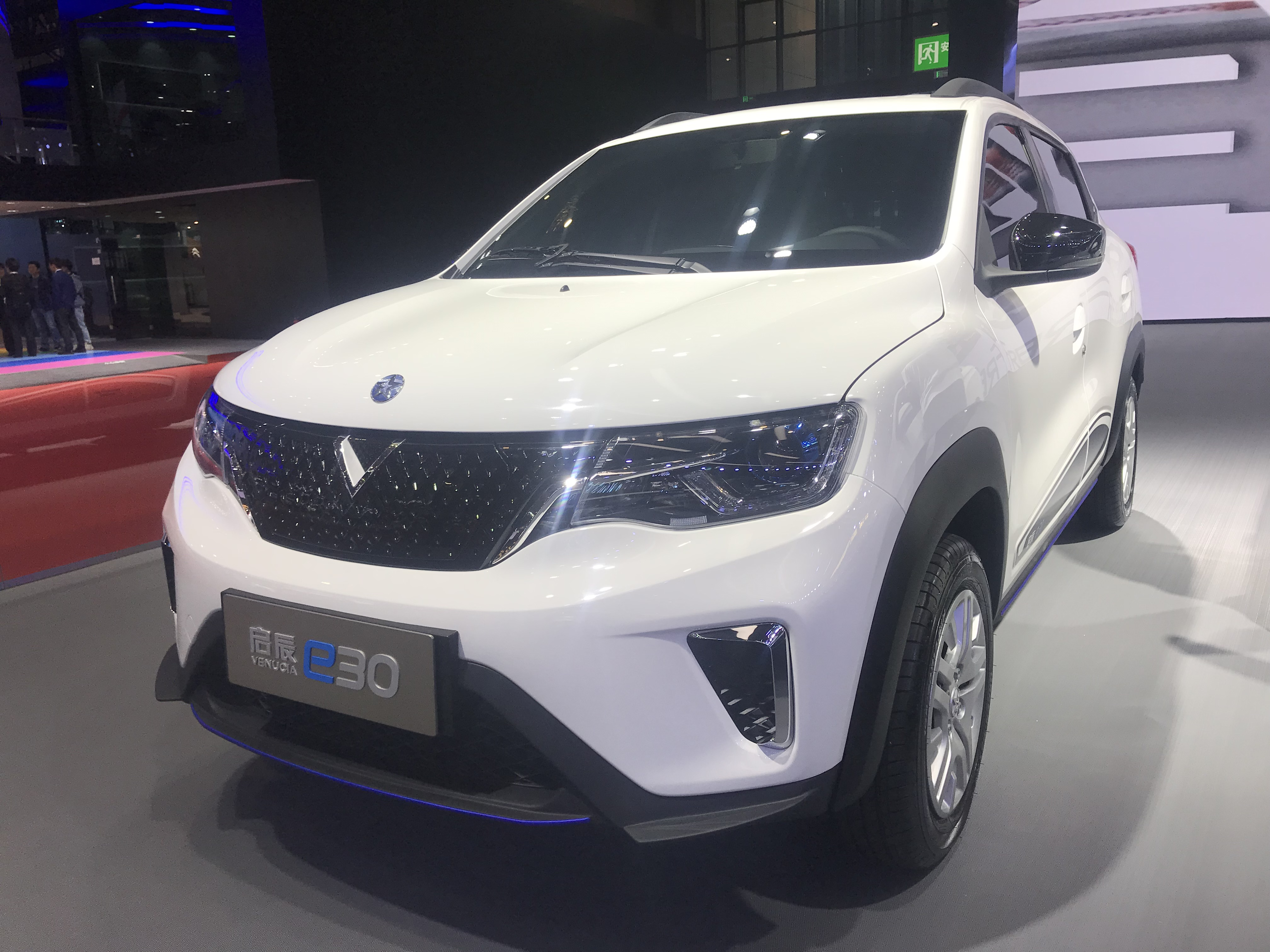
Venucia e30 EV (Post 2019)

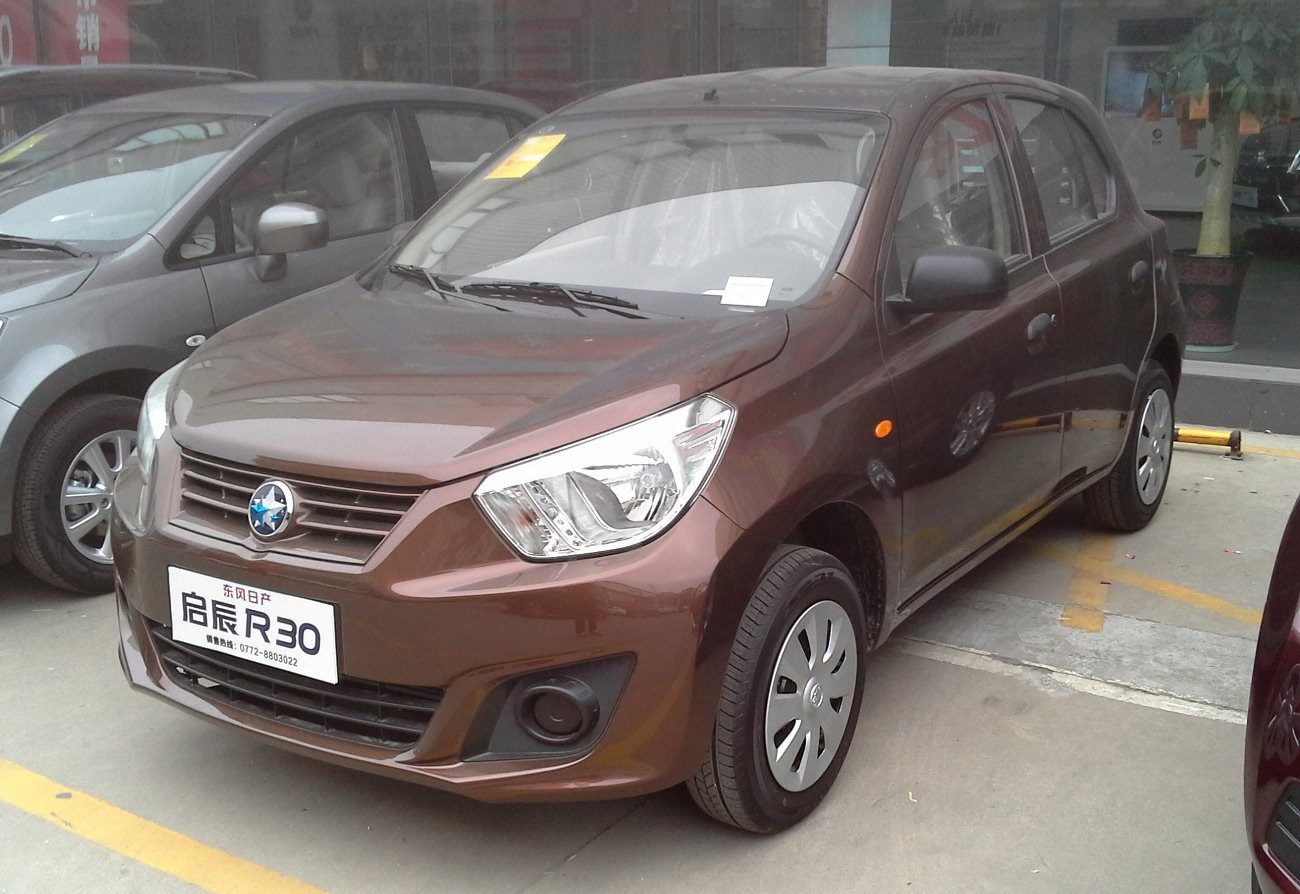
Venucia R30

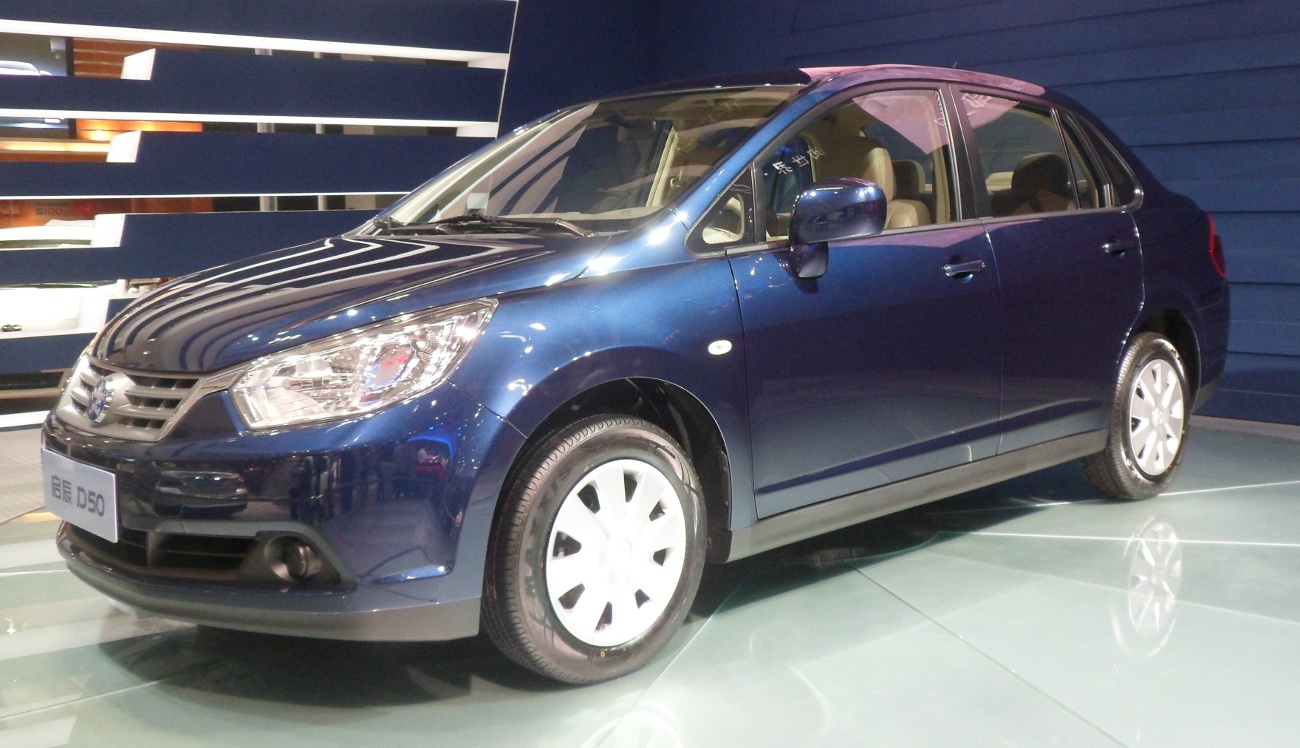
Venucia D50

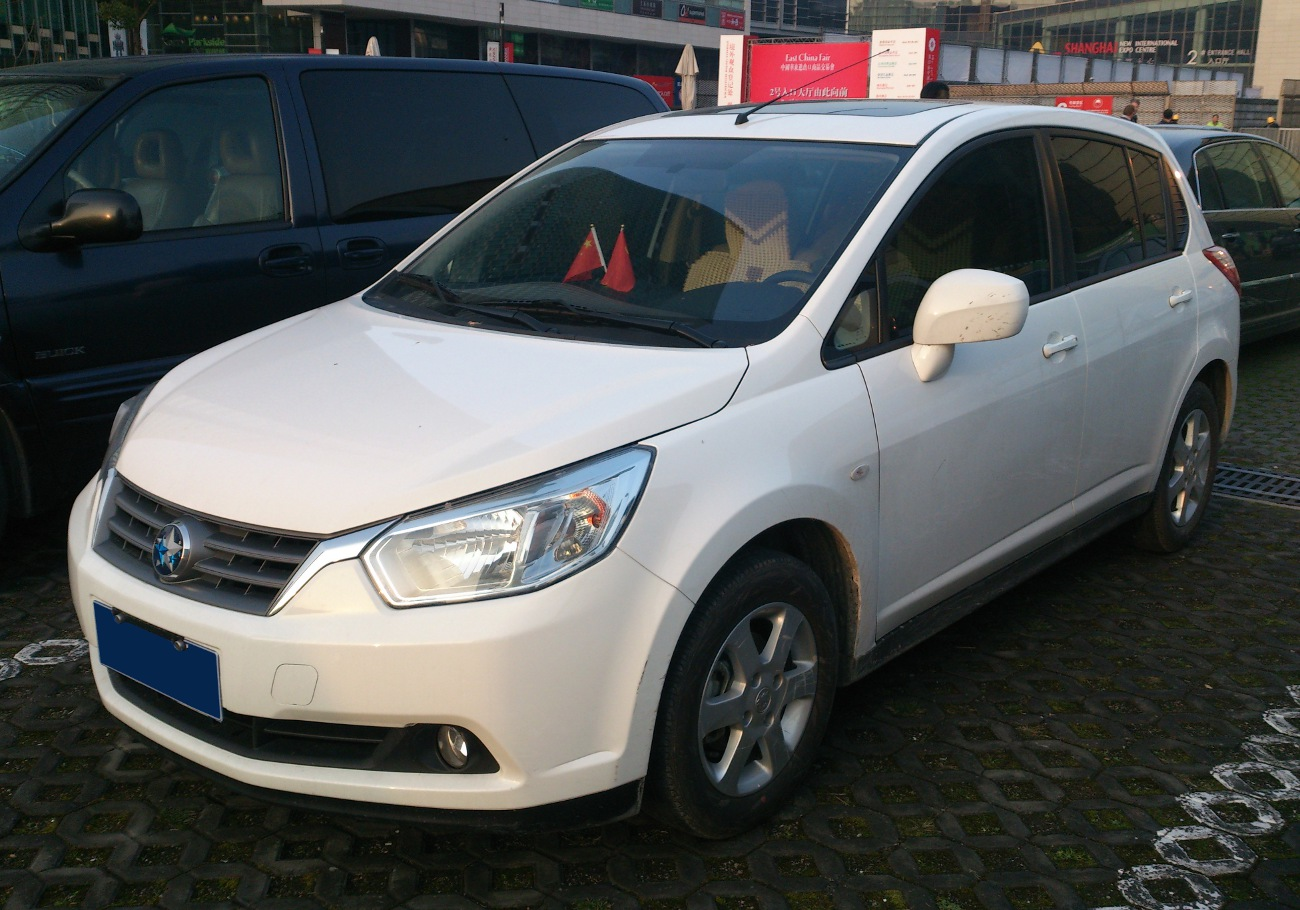
Venucia R50

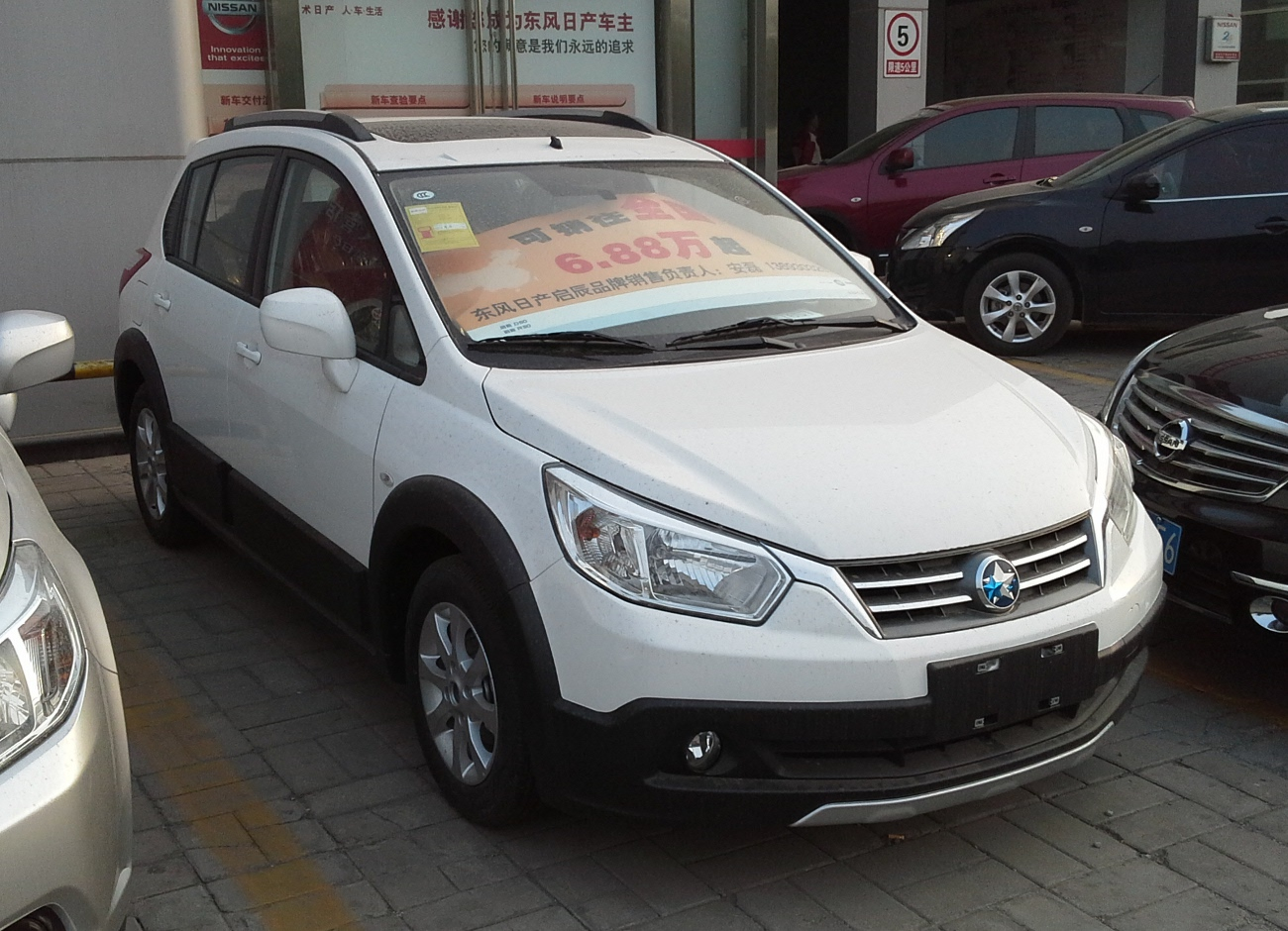
Venucia R50X

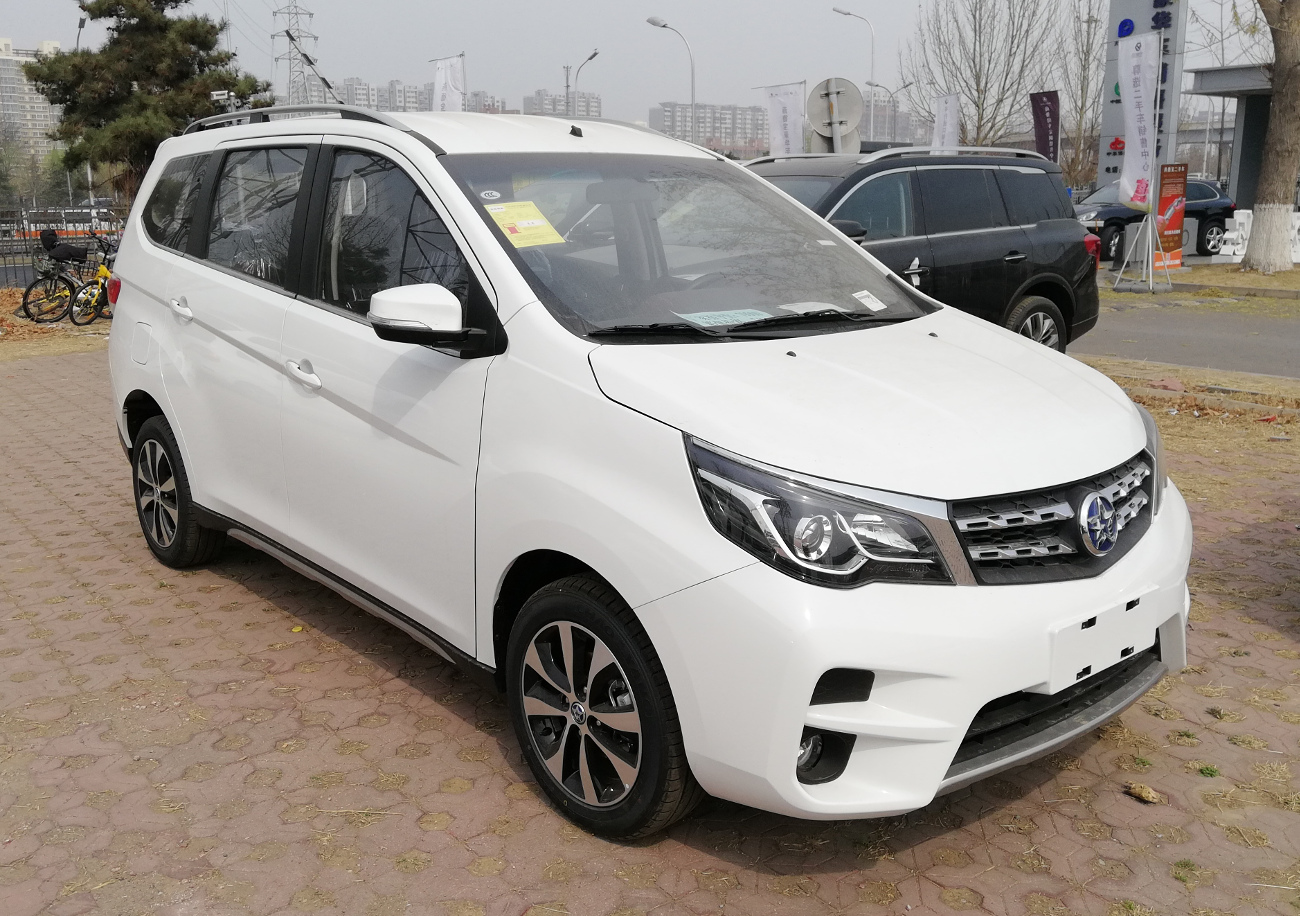
Venucia M50V

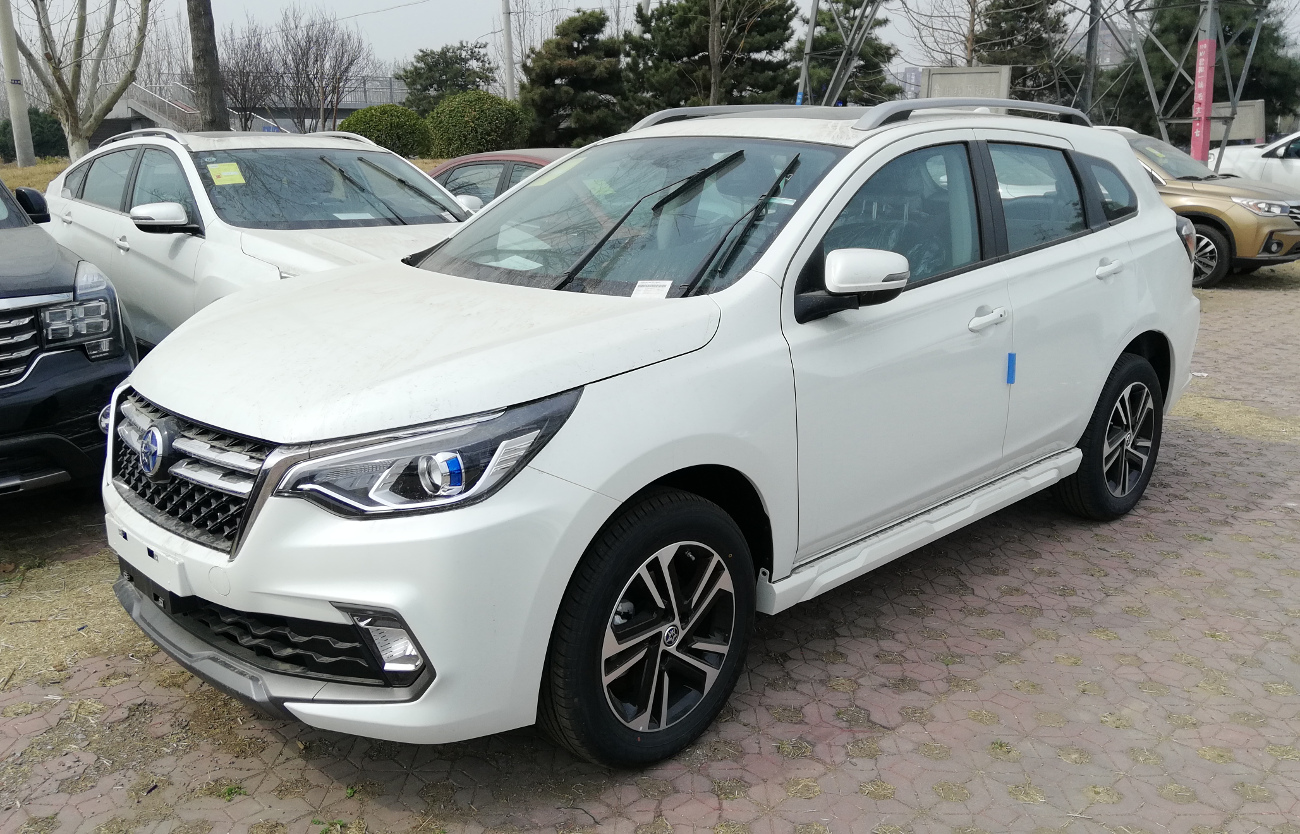
Venucia T70

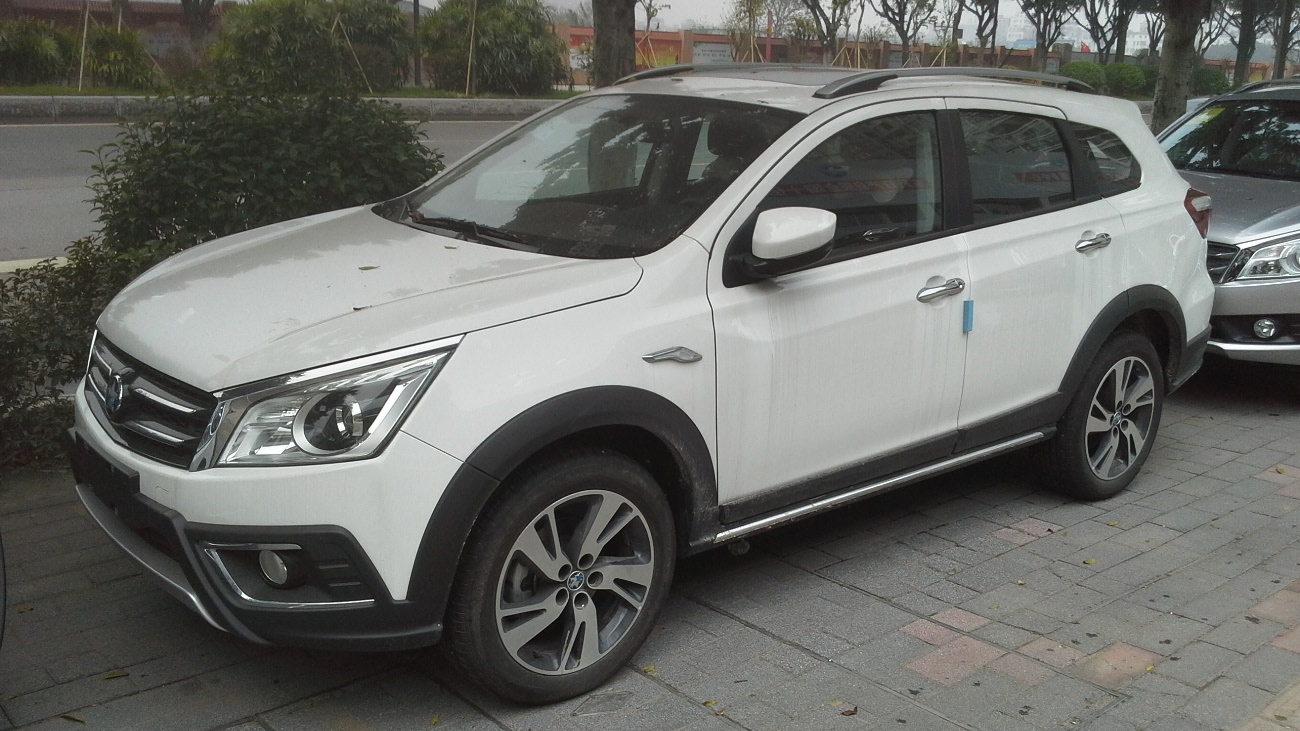
Venucia T70X

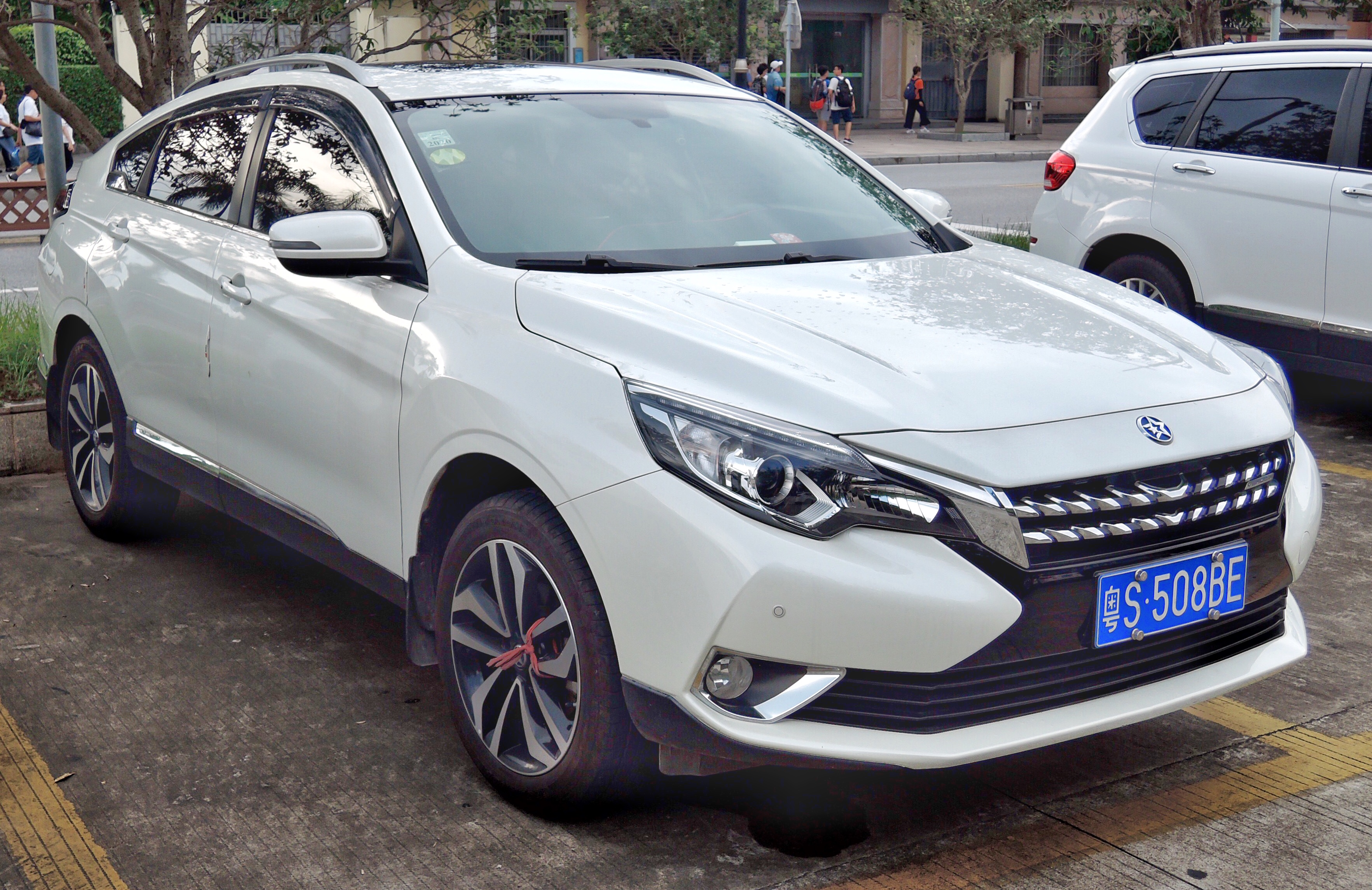
Venucia T90

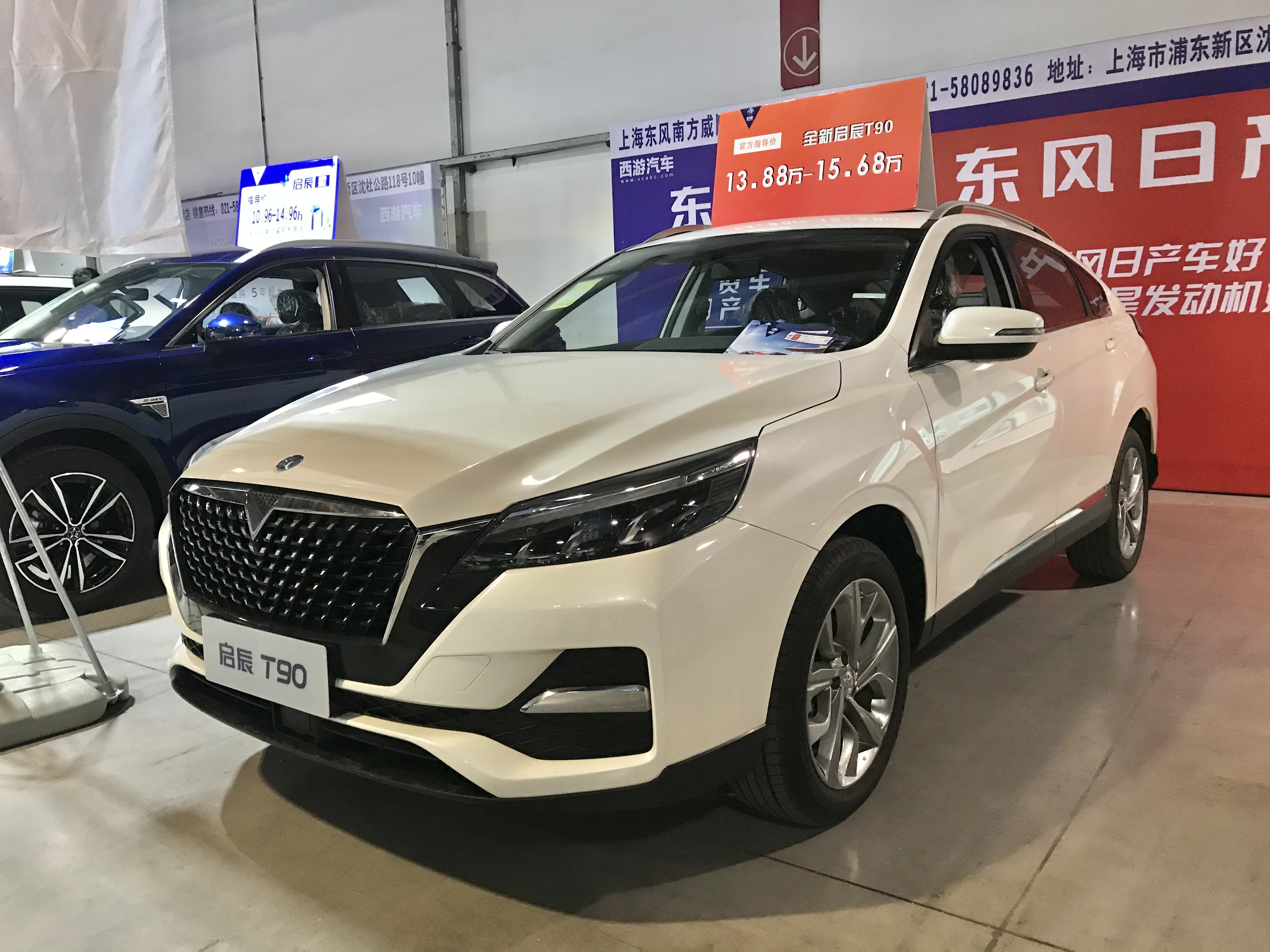
Venucia T90 facelift

=== Concept cars ===
- Venucia Viwa (electric vehicle concept, 2013)
- Venucia Vow (coupe concept, 2015)
- Venucia The X (crossover concept, 2018)
- Venucia The V (crossover concept, 2019)
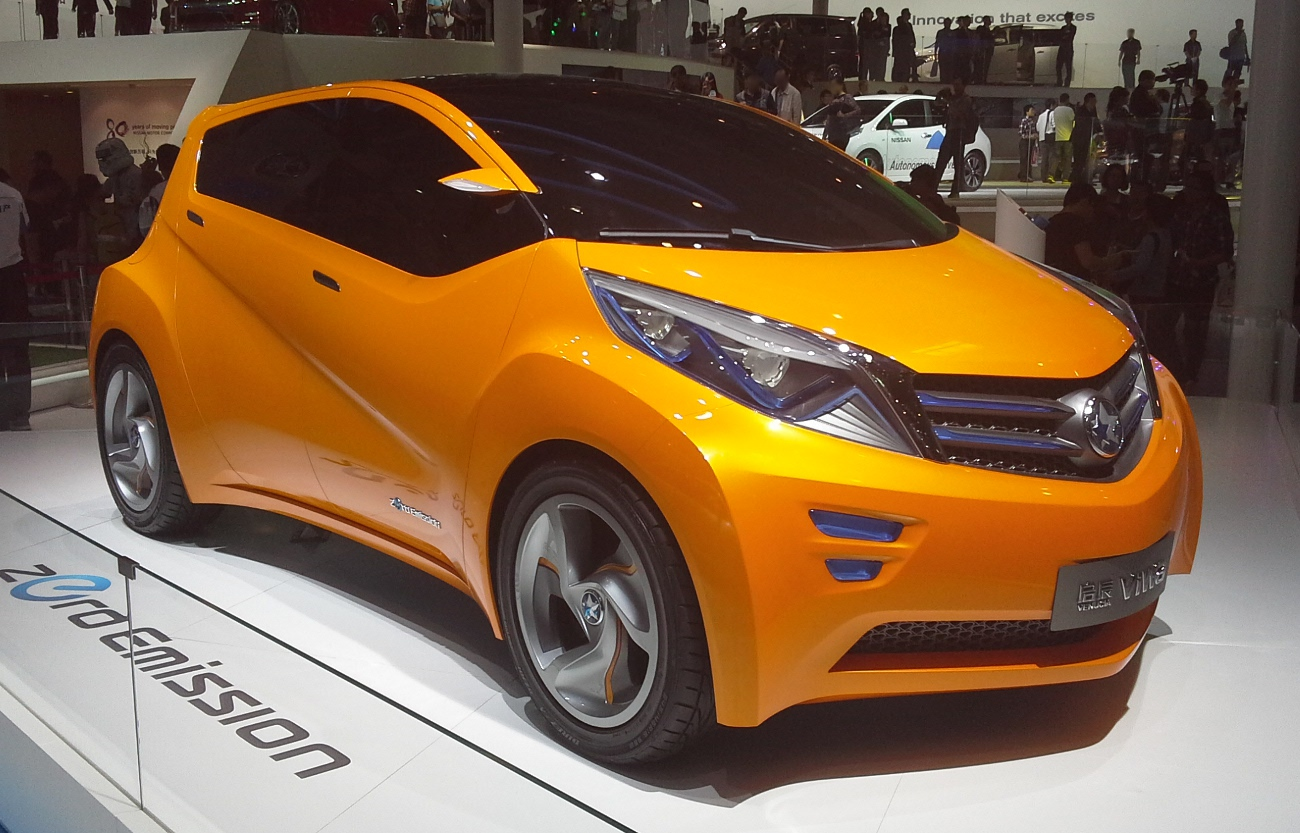
Venucia Viwa Concept

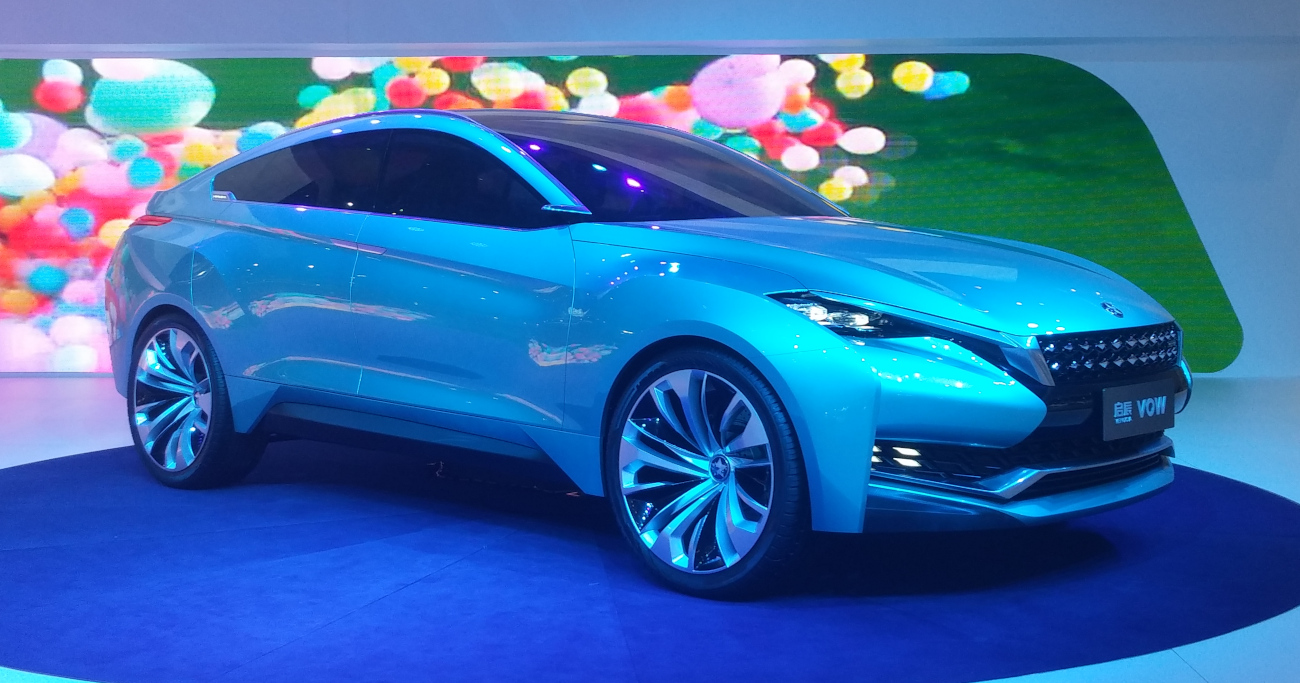
Venucia Vow Concept
