= Venucia R50 =

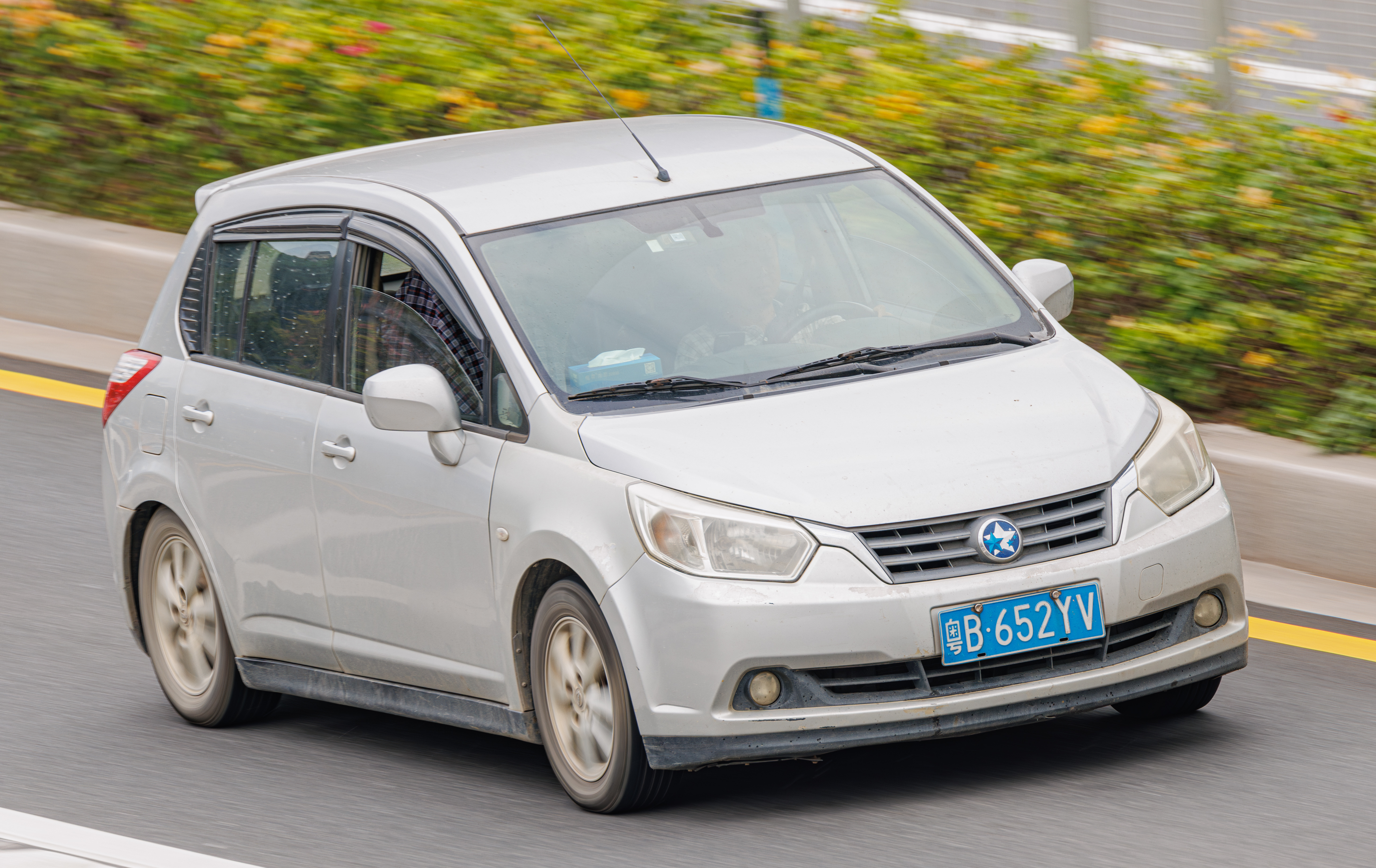

Overview
- Production: 2011–2016
- Assembly: China: Wuhan

Body and chassis
- Class: Subcompact car
- Body style: 4-door sedan (D50); 5-door hatchback (R50)
- Layout: Front-engine, front-wheel-drive
- Platform: Nissan B platform
- Related: Nissan Tiida; Nissan Livina; Nissan Note

Powertrain
- Engine: 1.6 L HR16DE (Renault H4M) I4 (gasoline)
- Transmission: 5-speed manual 4-speed automatic

Dimensions
- Wheelbase: 2,600 mm (102.4 in)
- Length: R50: 4,280 mm (168.5 in); D50: 4,480 mm (176.4 in); R50X: 4,307 mm (169.6 in)
- Width: R50 and D50: 1,695 mm (66.7 in); R50X: 1,730 mm (68.1 in)
- Height: R50 and D50: 1,535 mm (60.4 in); R50X: 1,564 mm (61.6 in)
- Curb weight: R50 and R50X: 1,139–1,160 kg (2,511–2,557 lb); D50: 1,107–1,131 kg (2,441–2,493 lb)

The Venucia R50 is a subcompact hatchback produced by the Chinese manufacturer Venucia since 2012, with the subcompact sedan version called the Venucia D50, and the crossover version called the Venucia D50X. The Venucia R50, R50X, and D50 are all based on the first generation Nissan Tiida featuring redesigned front and rear end styling.

== Overview ==
The Venucia D50 was launched on China car market in May 2012 as Venucia's first product. The Venucia R50 is available with a 1.6 litre engine producing 116 hp and 153nm with an option of either a 4-speed automatic or a 5-speed manual gearbox.

Introduced in September 2012, the Venucia R50 is available with a 1.6 litre engine producing 116 hp and 153nm with an option of either a 4-speed automatic or a 5-speed manual gearbox.

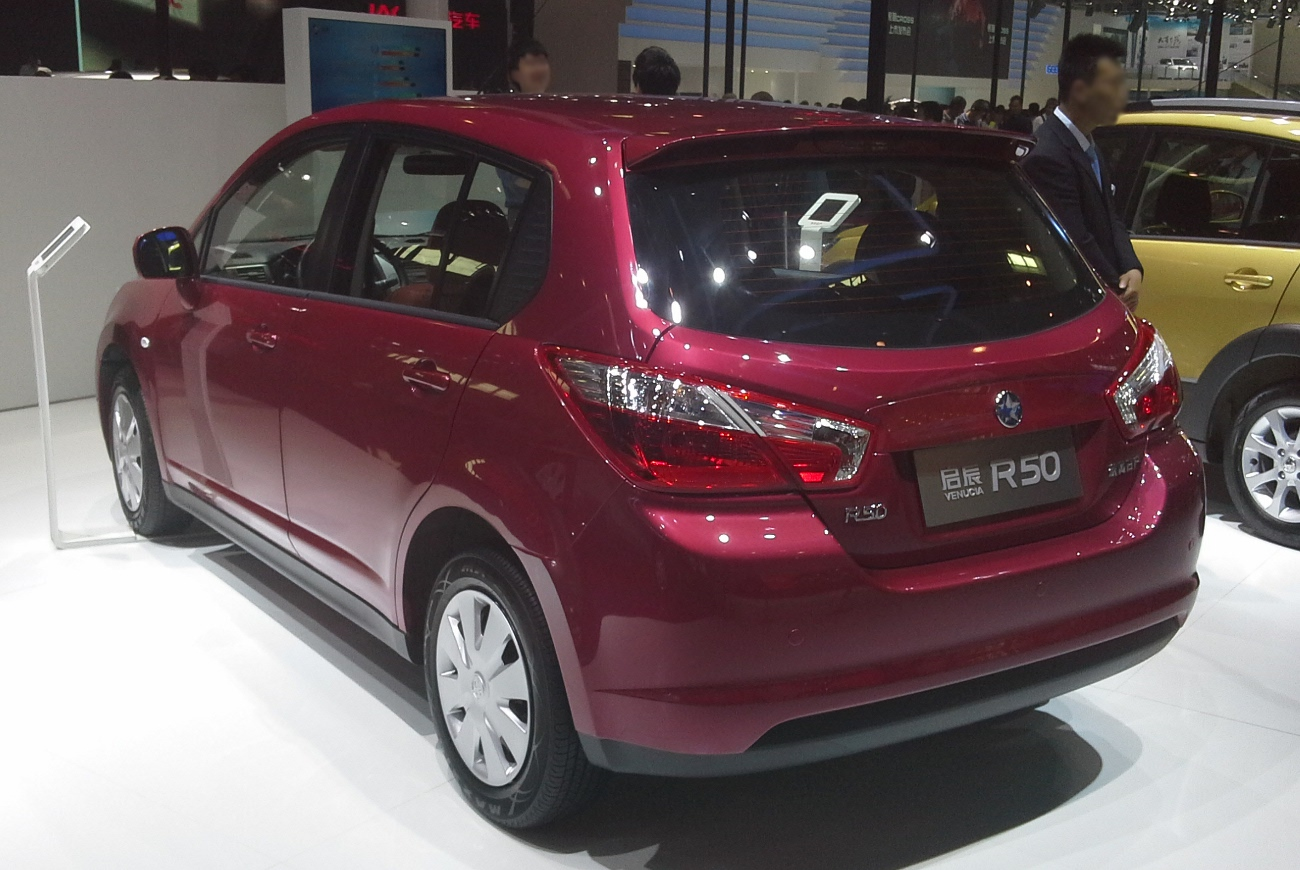
Venucia R50 rear

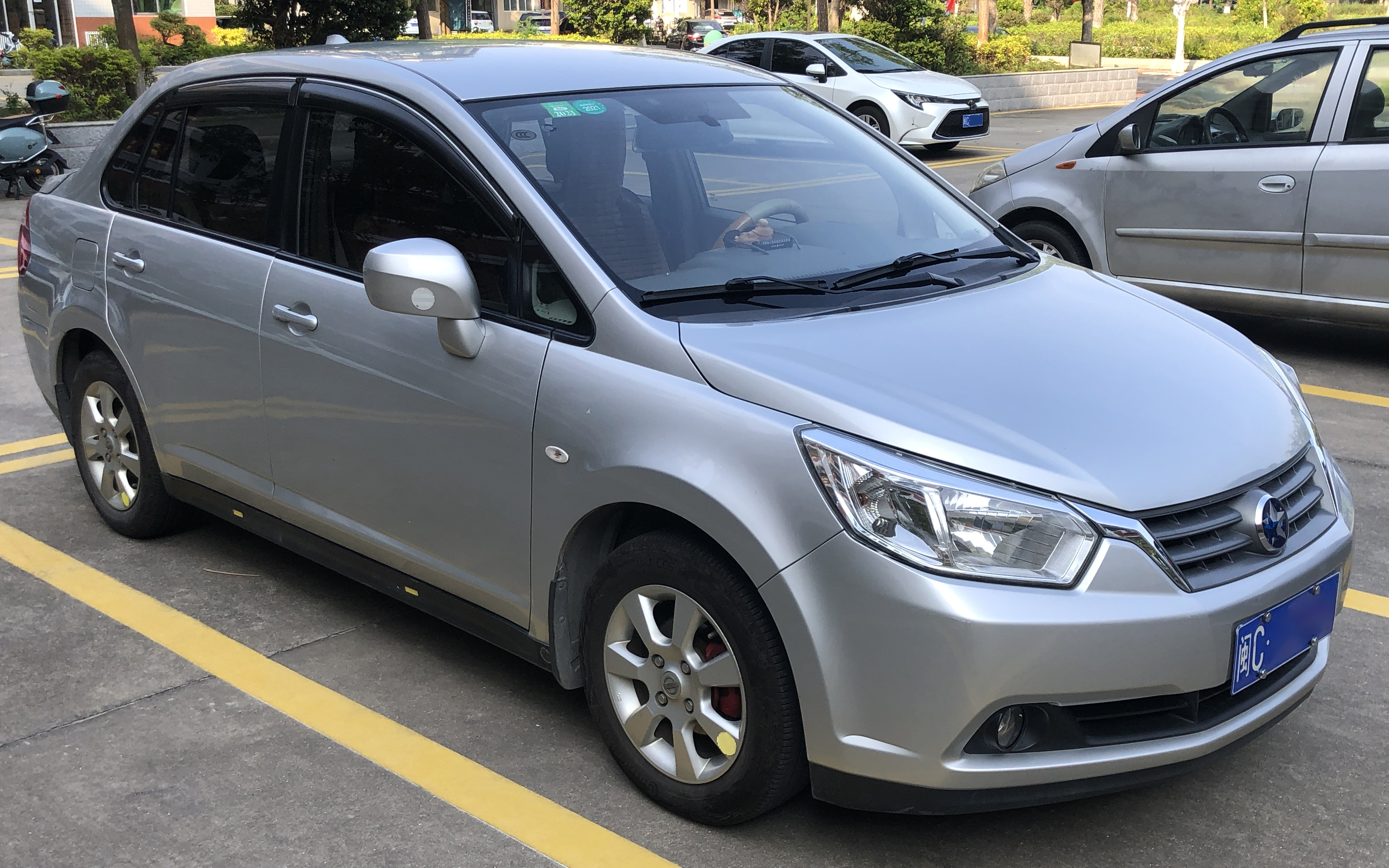
Venucia D50 front

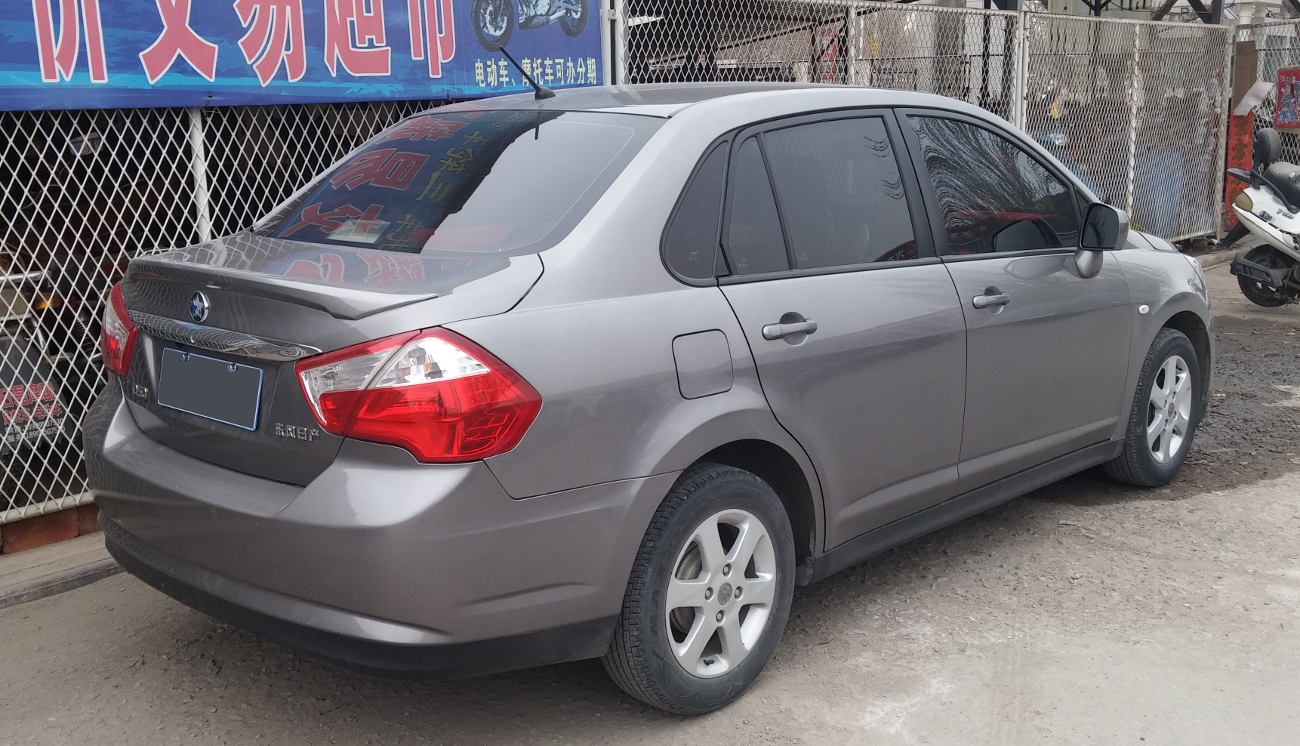
Venucia D50 rear

== R50X ==
The Venucia R50X was launched on the China car market in 2013 with prices starting from 79,800 yuan and ending at 91,800 yuan. The Venucia R50X is the crossover variant of the Venucia R50 hatchback.

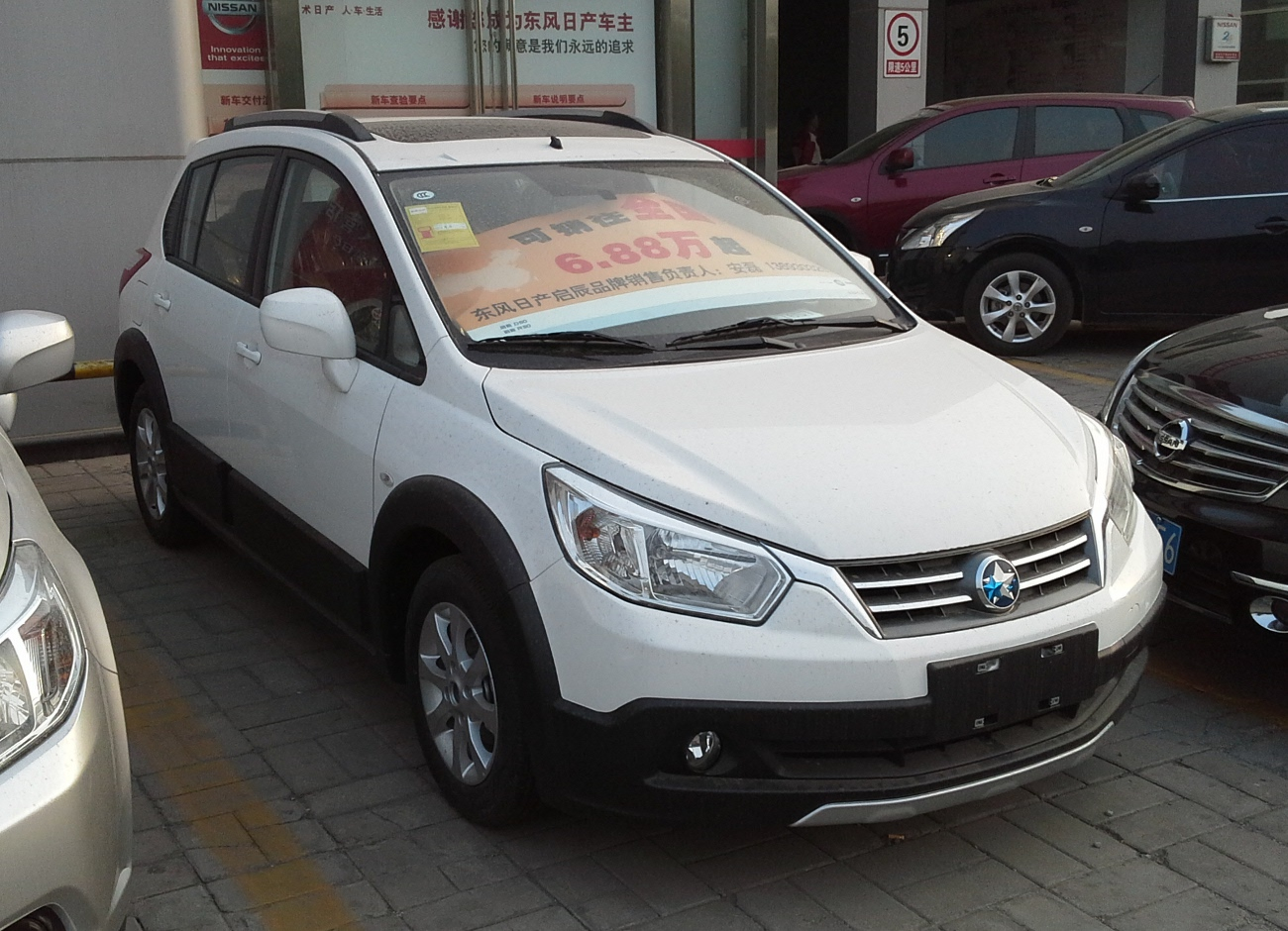
Venucia R50X front

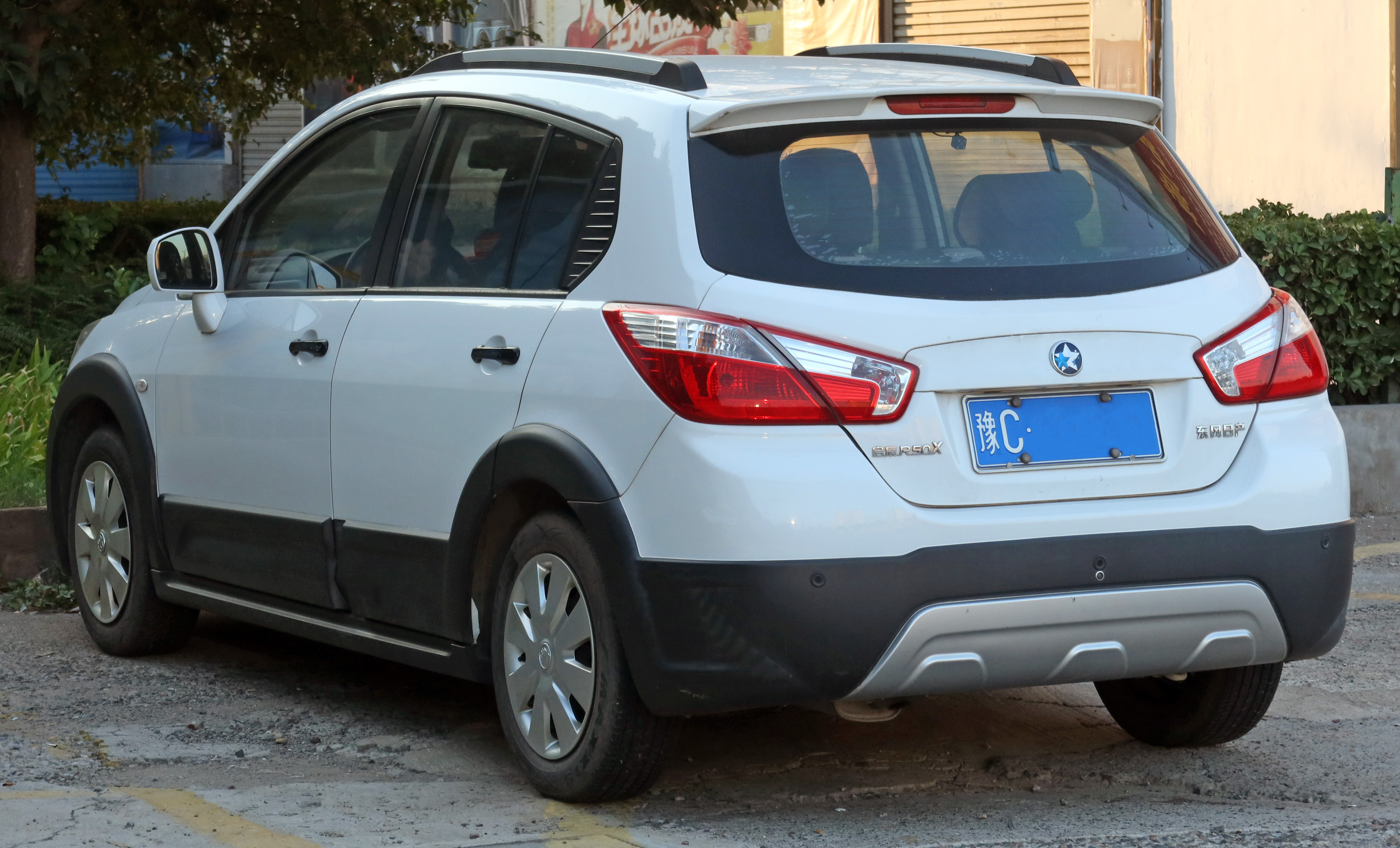
Venucia R50X rear
