= 60th Corps =

60th Corps or LX Corps may refer to:

- 60th Corps (China)
- 60th Corps (German Empire)
- 60th Rifle Corps, Soviet Union
- 60th (Glasgow, 1st Highland) Lanarkshire Rifle Volunteer Corps, United Kingdom
- 60th (Atherton) Lancashire Rifle Volunteer Corps, United Kingdom

== See also ==
- List of military corps by number
- 60th Brigade (disambiguation)
- 60th Division (disambiguation)
- 60th Regiment (disambiguation)
- 60th Squadron (disambiguation)
- 60th (disambiguation)
- LX (disambiguation)
