= 60th =

60th is the ordinal form of the number 60. 60th or Sixtieth may also refer to:

- A fraction, 1/60, equal to one of 60 equal parts
- 60th anniversary, also known as a Diamond jubilee

== Geography ==
- 60th meridian east, a line of longitude
- 60th meridian west, a line of longitude
- 60th parallel north, a circle of latitude
- 60th parallel south, a circle of latitude
- 60th Street (disambiguation)

== Military ==
- 60th Army
- 60th Brigade (disambiguation)
- 60th Division (disambiguation)
- 60th Regiment (disambiguation)
- 60th Squadron (disambiguation)

== Other ==
- 60th century
- 60th century BC

== See also ==
- 60 (disambiguation)
