= D60 =

D60 or D 60 may refer to:

== Cameras ==
- Canon EOS D60, a discontinued 6.3 megapixel digital single lens reflex camera
- Nikon D60, a 10.2-megapixel F-mount digital single-lens reflex camera

== Roads ==
- D60 road (Croatia), a state road
- D 60, Al Rashidiya Road, a road connecting Muhaisnah in Dubai Emirate, United Arab Emirates

=== Vehicles ===
- D60 steam locomotive, a 1951 Japanese 2-8-4 Berkshire wheel arrangement steam locomotives model
- HMS Caradoc (D60), a C-class light cruiser built for the Royal Navy during World War I
- Junpai D60, a 2014–present Chinese subcompact crossover
- Maxus D60, a 2019–present Chinese mid-size SUV
- New Flyer D60, a 1987–2006 Canadian high-floor transit bus
- Senova D60, a 2014–2017 Chinese mid-size sedan
- Venucia D60, a 2017–present Chinese compact sedan

== Other uses ==
- Queen's Gambit Declined (D60), an Encyclopedia of Chess Openings code
- Acquired pure red cell aplasia ICD-10 code
- Pueblo School District 60 in Pueblo, Colorado

== See also ==
- 60D (disambiguation)
- 60 (disambiguation)
