= LX =

LX or Lx may refer to:

== Arts and entertainment ==
- LX (rapper), of 187 Strassenbande
- LX (TV network), local news online and over-the-air network
- LXTV, a lifestyle and entertainment TV programming production unit of NBCUniversal

== Electronics and computing ==
- Linear Executable, the executable file format used by OS/2
- HP LX series, a palmtop computer series
- OpenMandriva Lx, a Linux distribution
- Pentax LX, a camera
- SPARCstation LX, a workstation
- T-Mobile Sidekick LX, a smartphone

== Science and mathematics ==
- 60 (number) in Roman numerals
- Lux (symbol: lx), the SI derived unit of illuminance
- Lipoxin, in medicine

== Transportation ==
=== Air transport ===
- Swiss International Air Lines, IATA airline code LX
- Luxembourg (aircraft registration prefix LX)

=== Automobiles ===
- Aion LX, a Chinese electric mid-size SUV
- Chrysler LX platform, an American automobile platform
- Exeed LX, a Chinese luxury compact SUV
- Lexus LX, a Japanese luxury full-size SUV
- Lotus LX, a one-off version of the Lotus Elite

=== Motorcycles ===
- Vespa LX, a series of Italian scooters

=== Trucks ===
- MAN LX and FX ranges of tactical trucks, a range of Dutch tactical trucks

== Other uses ==
- Lisbon, Portugal, commonly abbreviated as "LX" or "Lx"
- LX Cycling Team, from South Korea

== See also ==
- LXS
- 60 (disambiguation) (Roman numeral "LX")
- L10 (disambiguation)
- IX (disambiguation), not to be confused with "lx"
- 1X (disambiguation), not to be confused with "lx"
