= 60th Rifle Division =

60th Rifle Division may refer to:

- 60th Rifle Division (RSFSR), 1919–1921
- 60th Mountain Rifle Division, Soviet Union, 1941
- 60th Rifle Division (1941 formation), Soviet Union, September 1941 - 1945
- 60th Guards Rifle Division, Soviet Union, 1943–1946

== See also ==
- 60th Division (disambiguation)
