= Jósef Kamiński =

Polish and Soviet Colonel

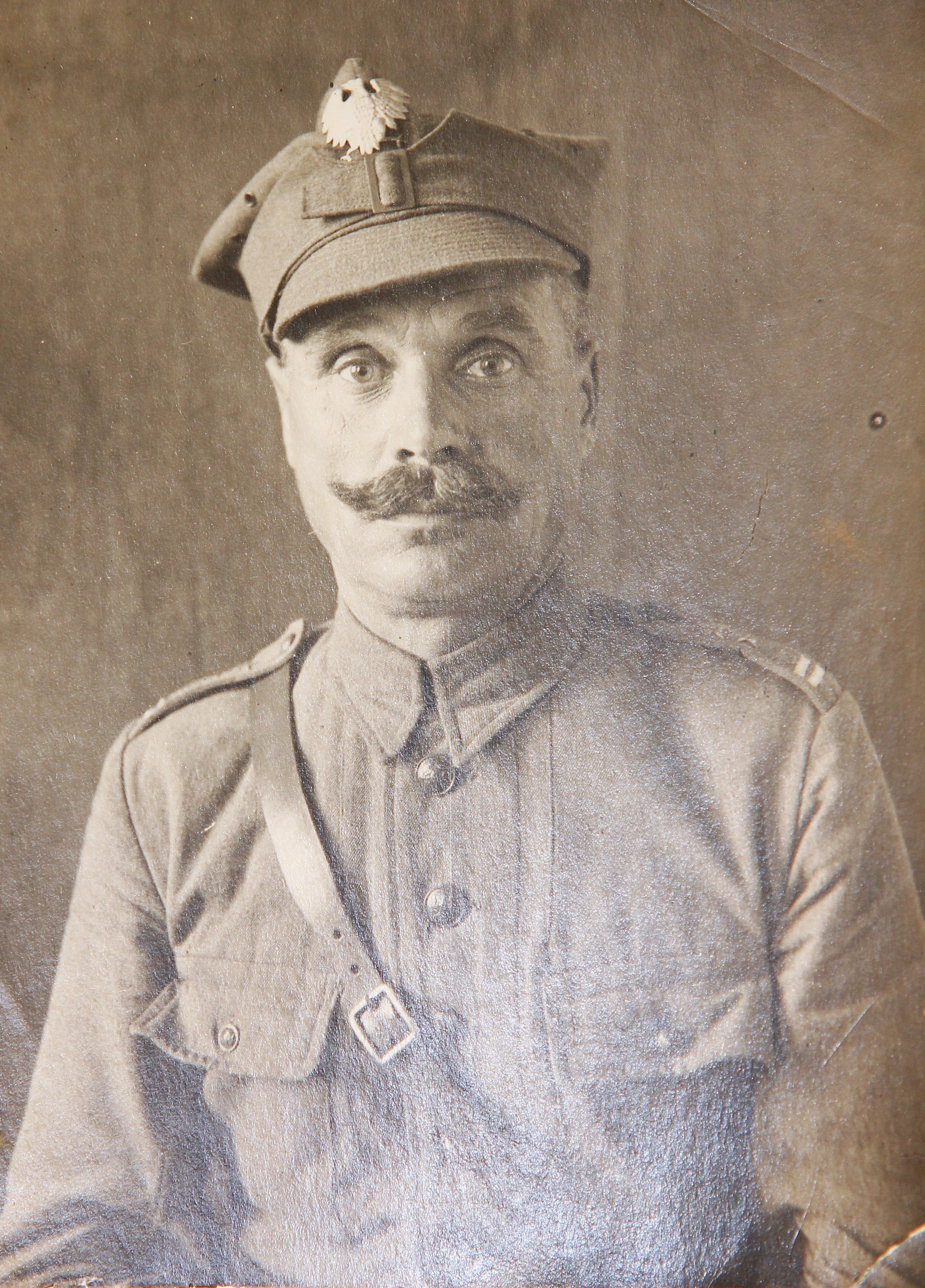
- Born: Иосиф Игнатьевич Каминский; February 2, 1896; Krynica, Vilna Governorate, Russian Empire (now Belarus)
- Died: January 16, 1968 (aged 71); Moscow, USSR
- Military career
- Allegiance: Soviet Union; Polish People's Republic
- Branch: Imperial Russian Army (1915-1918) Red Army/Soviet Army (1919-1944); Polish People's Army (1944-1948)
- Service years: 1915–1948
- Rank: Полковник (Colonel) (USSR); Pułkownik (Colonel) (Poland)
- Conflicts: World War I Russian Civil War; World War II
- Awards: Order of Lenin; Order of the Red Banner; Several others (see below)

Jósef Kamiński (Russian: Иосиф Игнатьевич Каминский; 21 January (Julian calendar) / 2 February (Gregorian calendar) 1896 – 16 January 1968) was a Red Army colonel who served in the Polish People's Army during World War II and in post-war serving in the Ministry of Public Security (Poland) in the Polish People's Republic.

== Biography ==
=== Before the October Revolution ===
Jósef Kamiński was the son of Ignacy Kamiński, a peasant from the Vilnius Governorate. The name of his mother is unknown. His father, Ignacy Kamiński, died in 1909. Following his father's death, Jósef had to work as a stable hand and, at the onset of World War I, as a trench digger and carpenter. In 1915, he was conscripted into the 25th Reserve Infantry Regiment of the 60th Infantry Division. In 1917, he was transferred to the 238th Betluzhsky Infantry Regiment of the same division. After the collapse of the Imperial Russian Army, he left the regiment and returned home.

=== Russian Civil War ===
In 1919, holding the rank of starshina, he joined the Separate Lithuanian Volunteer Battalion of the Red Army. Later that same year, he was promoted to platoon commander. In 1923, he married Nadezhda Borichevskaya, a rural school teacher. Despite the rise of atheistic propaganda in Soviet Russia, Nadezhda and Jósef married in a traditional Orthodox ceremony.

=== Before the World War II ===
In 1930, Jósef was sent to study at the Higher Officer's Course "Vystrel". In 1931, he joined the Communist Party of the Soviet Union (WKP(b)) and was transferred to Turkestan, where he fought against the bands of Ibrahim Bek. He later worked in the personnel department of the Central Asian Military District. In 1938, he was dismissed from the Red Army due to having relatives abroad. However, he appealed the dismissal, and in 1939, he was reinstated in the Red Army and assigned as a tactics instructor at the Command Improvement Courses. Following the reorganization of the courses, he became the deputy head of the Infantry School in Makhachkala.

In 1940, he was promoted to the rank of colonel. That same year, Jósef and Nadezhda welcomed their son, Felix, in Makhachkala.

=== World War II ===
==== Soviet Army ====
After the outbreak of World War II, Jósef assumed the position of Chief of Staff and Deputy Commander of the 41st Rifle Division. In November 1941, he was severely wounded.
After his recovery, he was appointed commander of the 247th unit covering the Caucasus Ridge. During the defense of the Caucasus, he sustained a minor injury. During this time, Jósef Kamiński's family was evacuated to the town of Manglisi in Georgia.

==== Polish People's Army ====
In 1944, he was sent to Ryazan to work at the Higher Officer School of the Polish Army. Under the command of Commandant Martanus, he served as the Deputy Commandant of combat units. He later participated in the liberation of Warsaw. In Warsaw, he continued his work at the Higher Officer School in Rembertów, where he moved with his family.

=== Post-war ===
After the disbandment of the Higher Officer School in Rembertów, Jósef was transferred to the Internal Security Corps and appointed Commandant of the Officer School of the Internal Security Corps. In 1948, he took up the position of Deputy Director of the Training Department at the Ministry of Public Security, where he worked until May 31 of that year. On June 1, 1948, he was transferred to the Soviet Union and placed at the disposal of the Main Personnel Directorate of the Ministry of Defense of the USSR.

After his demobilization, Jósef settled in the Moscow Oblast, and later in Moscow itself. He lived with his family on Studencheskaya Street. In the same neighborhood lived the former commander of the Internal Security Corps, Bolesław Kieniewicz, with whom Jósef Kamiński maintained a close friendship after the war.

Jósef Kamiński died on January 16, 1968, at the 1586th Military Clinical Hospital in Khlebnikovo. He was buried in Moscow, at the Vostryakovskoye Cemetery.

== Awards and decorations ==
- Polish People's Republic:
  - Knight's Cross of the Order of Polonia Restituta (24 May 1946)
  - Gold Cross of Merit (Poland) (16 July 1946)
- Soviet Union:
  - Order of Lenin (USSR)
  - Order of the Red Banner (USSR)
  - Order of the Patriotic War 1st Class (USSR)
  - Medal "For the Victory over Germany in the Great Patriotic War 1941–1945" (USSR)
  - Medal "For the Defence of the Caucasus" (USSR)
  - Medal "For the Liberation of Warsaw" (USSR)

== Family ==
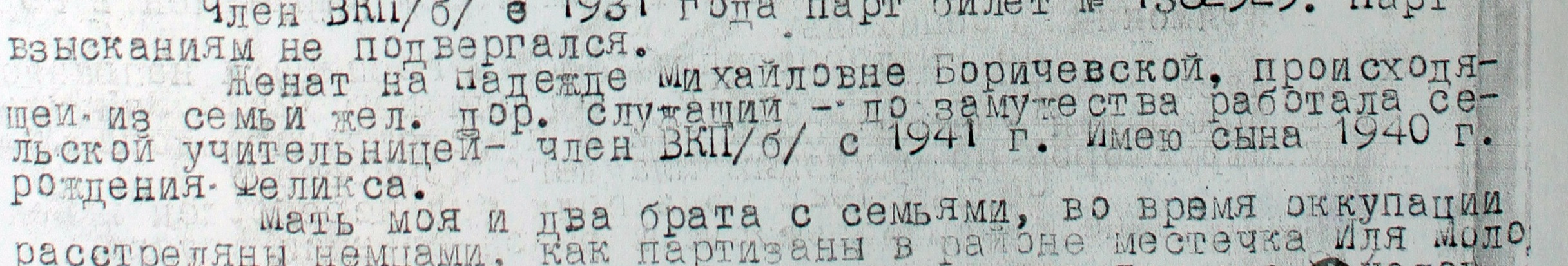
Excerpt from the autobiography document written by Jósef Kamiński

Jósef Kamiński was married to Nadezhda Mikhailovna from the Borichevsky family (deceased). Their only son is Felix (died in June 2026).

The mother of Jósef Kamiński and his two brothers (whose names are unknown) were executed by the Nazis as partisans during World War II in the Vladytsky Forest near the town of Ilya in the Minsk region. Jósef Kamiński's sisters are Katarzyna and Tekla (deceased).

Jósef Kamiński's older brother, Matwijej, immigrated to the United States in 1913. He died on August 19, 1980, in Cleveland.
