= 60th Division =

In military terms, 60th Division may refer to:

== Infantry divisions ==
- 60th Division (People's Republic of China)
- 60th Infantry Division (France)
- 60th Infantry Division (Wehrmacht), Germany
- 60th Infantry Division "Sabratha", Italy
- 60th Division (Imperial Japanese Army)
- 60th Infantry Division (Poland)
- 60th Infantry Division (Russian Empire)
- 60th Rifle Division (RSFSR), Russian Red Army
- 60th Infantry Division (South Korea)
- 60th Guards Rifle Division, Soviet Union
- 60th Mountain Rifle Division, Soviet Union
- 60th Division (Syria)
- 60th (2/2nd London) Division, United Kingdom

== Armoured divisions ==
- 60th Tank Division, Soviet Union, 1965–1989

== Other divisions ==
- 60th Rocket Division, Soviet Union

== See also ==
- List of military divisions by number
- 60th Brigade (disambiguation)
- 60th Regiment (disambiguation)
- 60th Squadron (disambiguation)
