= 60D =

60D may refer to:

- Canon EOS 60D DSLR camera introduced in 2010
- Tesla Model X 60D, all-electric cross-over SUV (CUV/XUV)

== See also ==
- D60 (disambiguation)
- 60 (disambiguation)
