= LXS =

LXS may refer to:

- Lemnos International Airport (IATA airport code LXS), Lemnos Island, Greece
- Lanxess (stock ticker LXS), German chemicals company
- Team LXS, a subformation of SNH48 Group, a Chinese idol group factory for the female idol group SNH48
- Lexus LXS, a luxury sedan, a variant of the Lexus ES
- LXS, a Toyota model code

== See also ==
- LX (disambiguation), for the singular of LXs
