= Ix =

IX may refer to:

- IX, the Roman numeral for the number 9

IX or Ix may also refer to:

== Arts and entertainment ==
=== Music ===
- IX (...And You Will Know Us by the Trail of Dead album)
- IX (Bulldozer album)
- IX (Corrosion of Conformity album)
- IX, used as a logo by the band Ice Nine Kills
- IX, the first song off of Trivium's album What the Dead Men Say

=== Literature ===
- iX (magazine), a German monthly computer magazine
- Ix (Dune), a fictional planet in Frank Herbert's Dune
- Ix (Oz), a fictional country in Queen Zixi of Ix by L. Frank Baum
- Ix, the central governmental supercomputer in Omikron: The Nomad Soul
- Ix, the nickname of Ford Prefect from the Hitchhiker's Guide to the Galaxy by Douglas Adams

=== Other media ===
- The IX monogram, a monogram for Christ
- Ix, the primary antagonist of Sonic Chronicles: The Dark Brotherhood
- IX, a map in zombies mode (chaos storyline) of Call of Duty Black Ops 4
- IX, a group of entities from the video game Destiny 2
- IX, Aeon of Nihility in Honkai: Star Rail

== Other uses ==
- IxD, interaction design
- Internet exchange point
- Air India Express (IATA airline code IX), budget arm of Air India
- Noveschi, an oligarchy ruling Siena, Italy during the late Middle Ages
- Ix, the 14th day in the Tzolk'in calendar
- Ix Chel, Maya jaguar goddess
- Ix Ek' Naah, Maya queen
- defunct Flandre Air (IATA airline code IX)
- A US Navy hull classification symbol: Unclassified miscellaneous vessel (IX)
- iX, the short name of iXsystems
- BMW iX, an electric sport utility vehicle
- I-X Center or International Exposition Center in Cleveland, Ohio, U.S.
- IX XI, a documentary film directed by Sean Wilsey
- Title IX (disambiguation)
- Orix (NYSE ticker)
