= Venucia D60 =

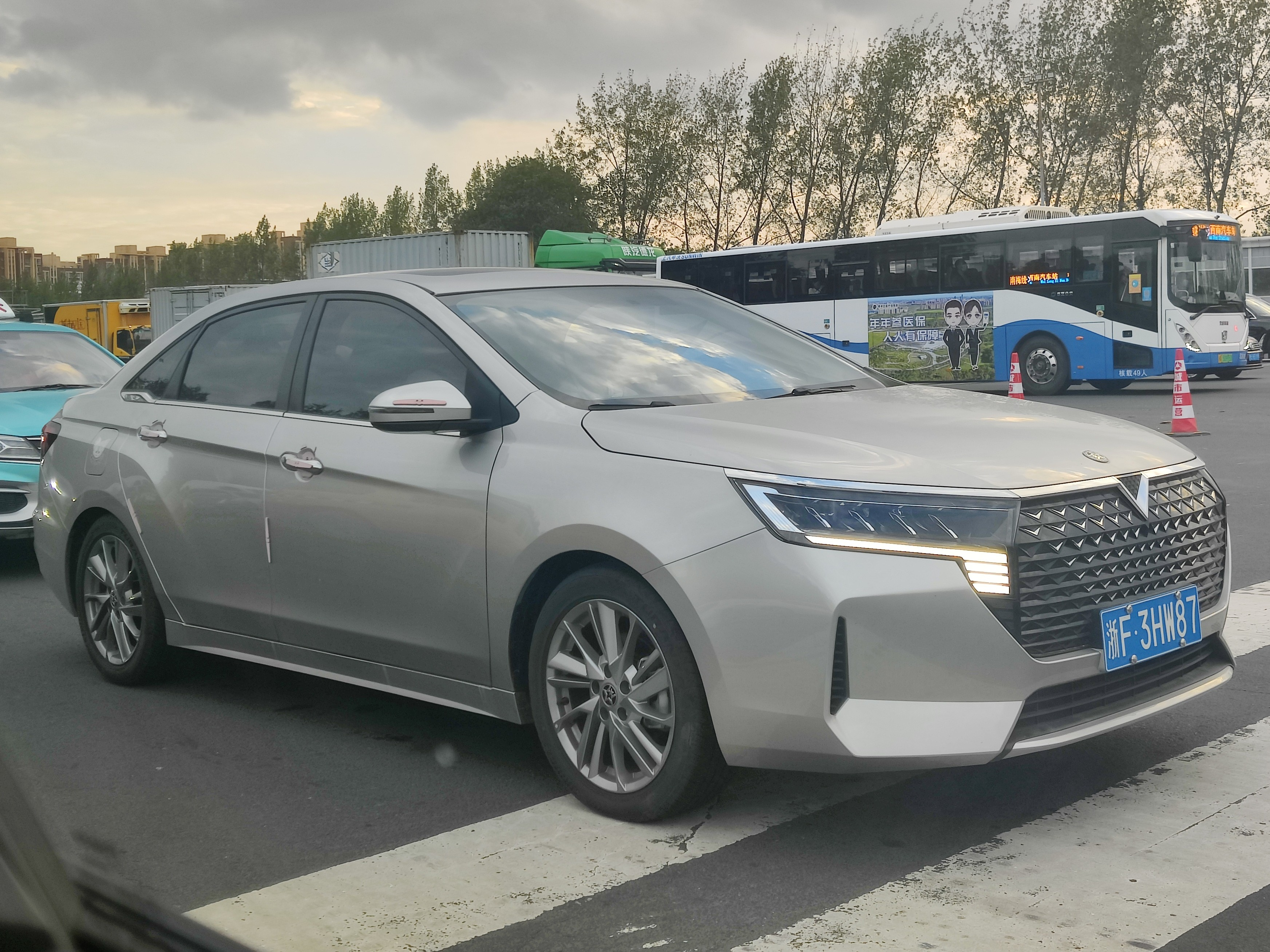
- Venucia D60 Plus

Overview
- Manufacturer: Venucia (Dongfeng Nissan)
- Production: 2017–present
- Assembly: China: Wuhan (Dongfeng Venucia Motor Company)

Body and chassis
- Class: Compact car (C)
- Body style: 4-door sedan
- Layout: Front-engine, front-wheel-drive
- Platform: Nissan V platform
- Related: Nissan Sylphy

Powertrain
- Engine: 1.6 L HR16DE I4 (petrol)
- Electric motor: Permanent magnet synchronous
- Power output: 163 PS; 161 hp (120 kW)
- Transmission: 5-speed manual XTRONIC CVT automatic Single gear (D60EV)
- Battery: 58 kWh Ternary Li-ion

Dimensions
- Wheelbase: 2,700 mm (106.3 in)
- Length: 4,756 mm (187.2 in)
- Width: 1,803 mm (71.0 in)
- Height: 1,487 mm (58.5 in)
- Curb weight: 1,198–1,261 kg (2,641–2,780 lb)

The Venucia D60 is a compact three-box sedan produced by Chinese auto maker Venucia, a subsidiary of Dongfeng Motor Co., Ltd.

== Overview ==
The Venucia D60 debuted in China in late 2017, and is based on the Nissan Sylphy sedan produced by the Dongfeng-Nissan joint venture. The Venucia D60 compact sedan is powered by the HR16 1.6 liter engine mated to a 5-speed manual transmission or CVT gearbox. Prices of the Venucia D60 starts from 69,800 yuan to 111,800 yuan.

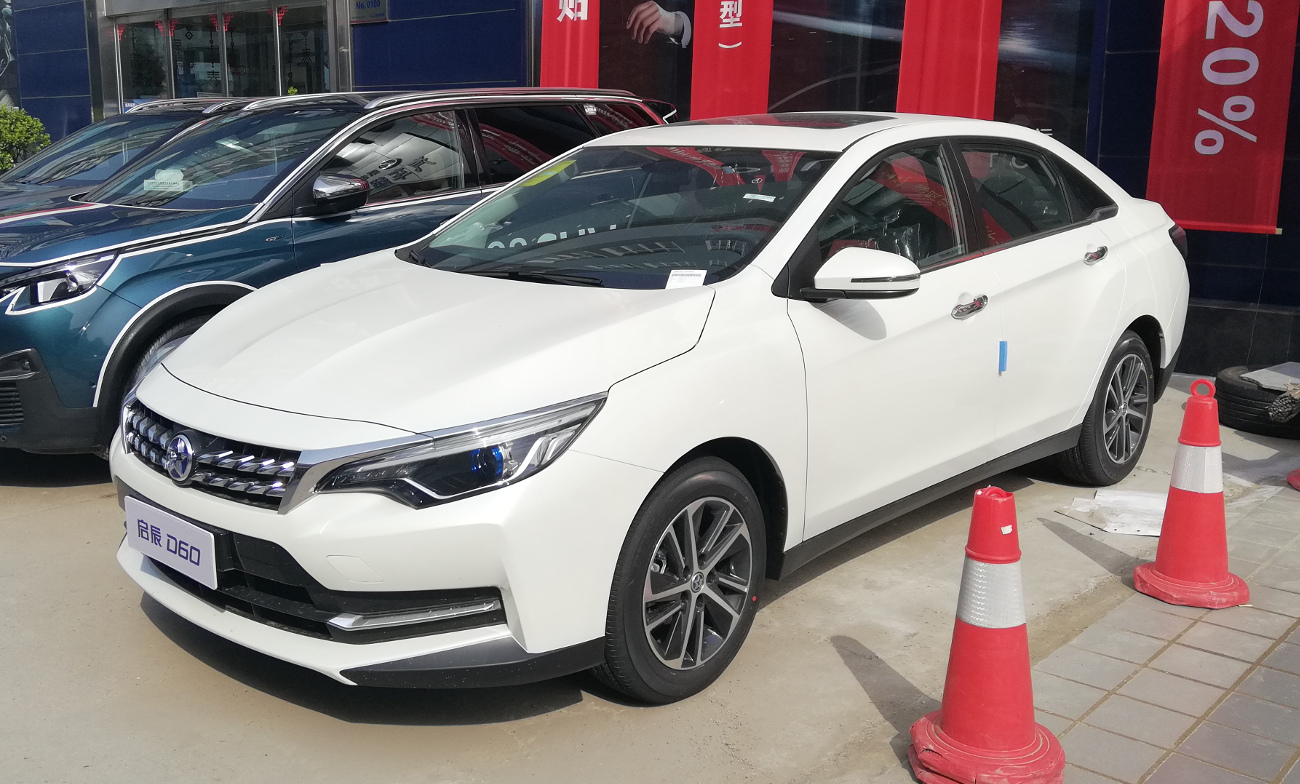
Venucia D60 (front)

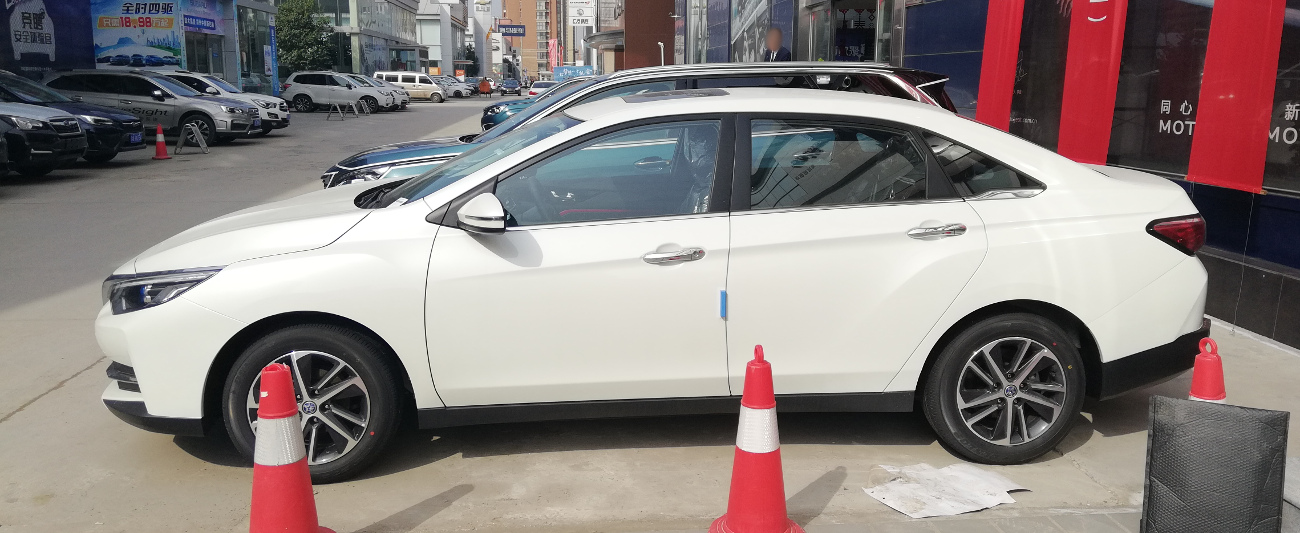
Venucia D60

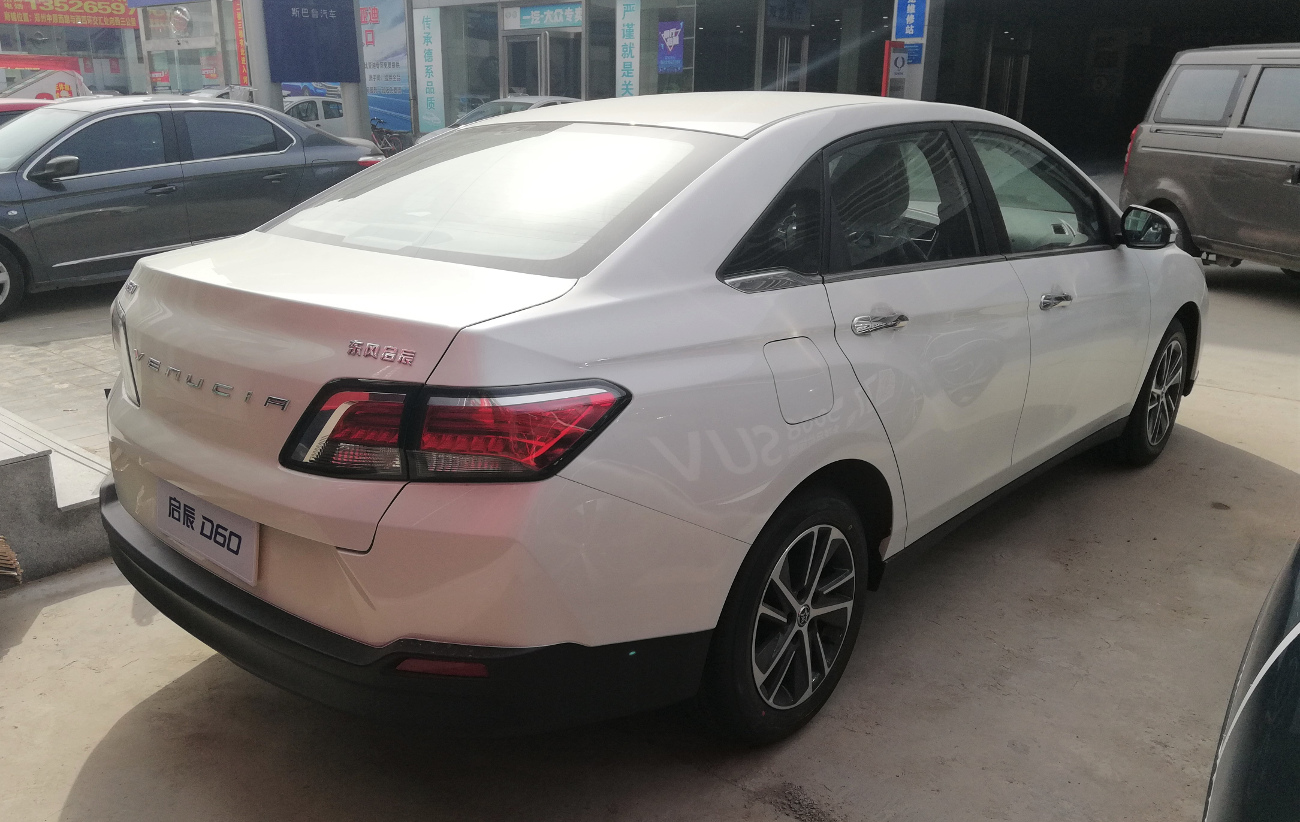
Venucia D60 (rear)

=== 2019 facelift ===
A minor facelift was launched in 2019 featuring a redesigned front fascia previewed by the Venucia D60EV revealed in April 2019. The update features an updated grille inspired by Venucia concepts at the time.

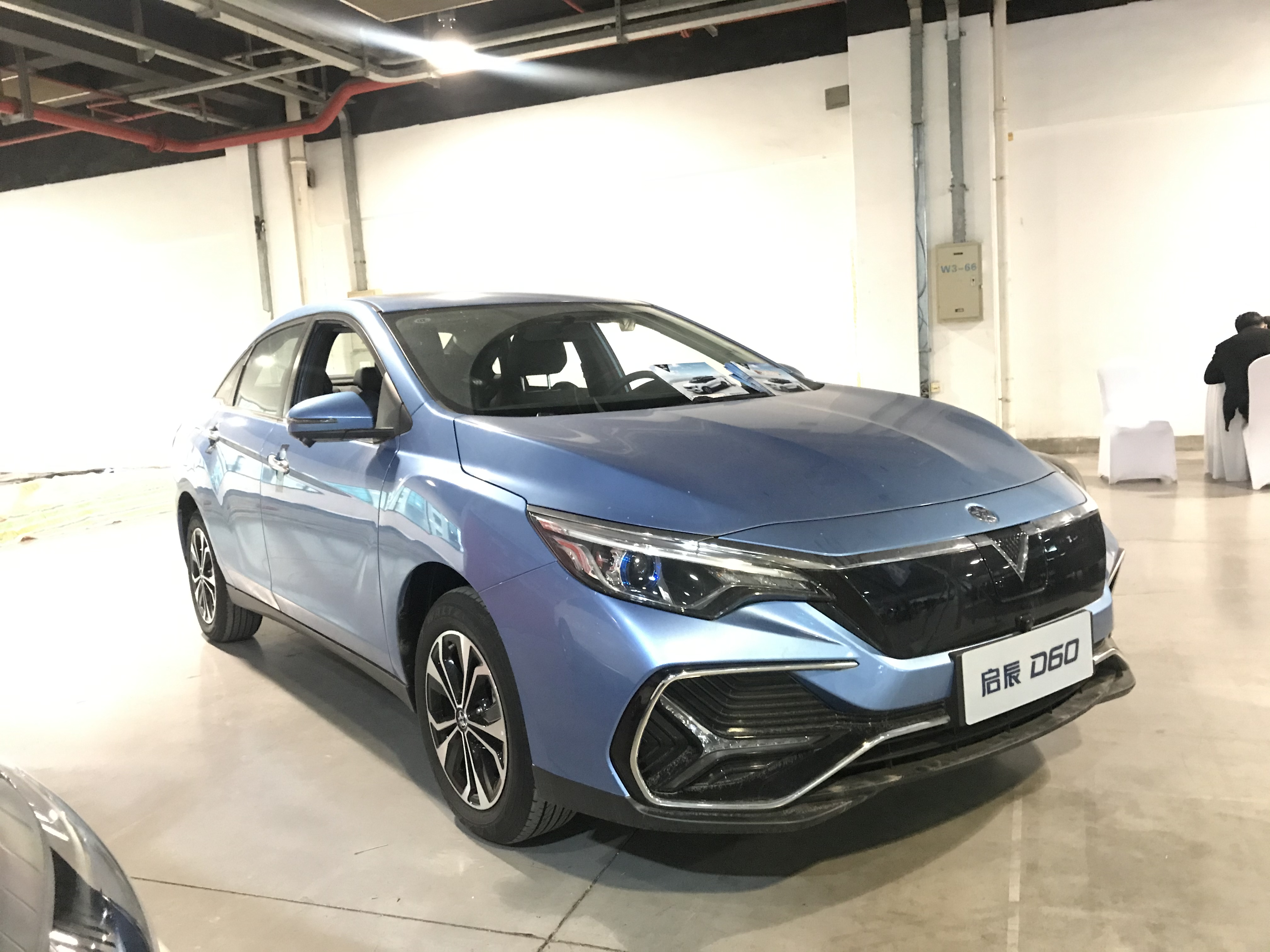
Venucia D60 facelift

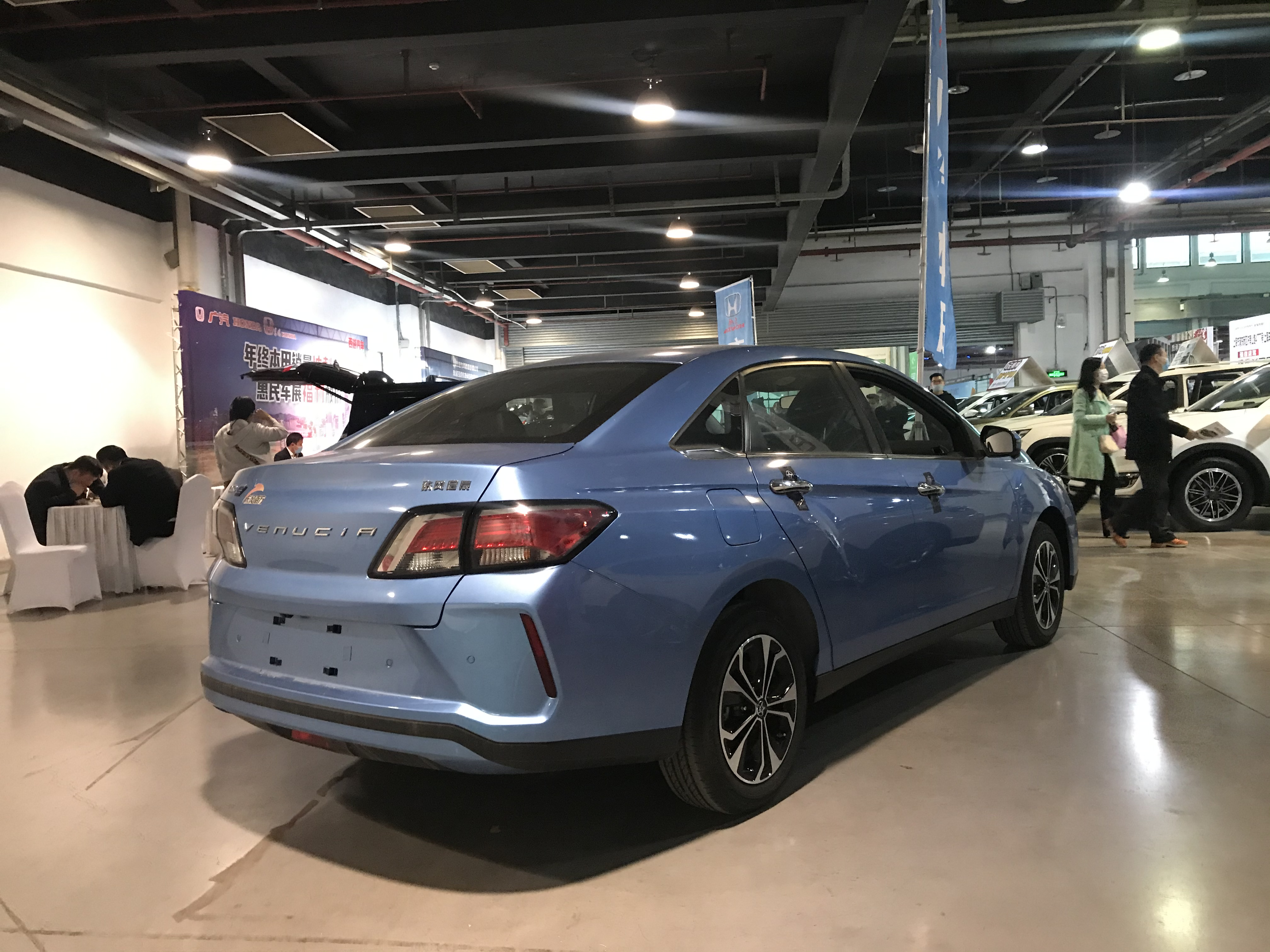
Venucia D60 facelift (rear)

=== Venucia D60 Plus ===
A major facelift dubbed the D60 Plus was launched for the 2021 model year, featuring a completely redesigned front end in the same style as the Venucia Xing. The power configuration of the D60 Plus remains to be the original Nissan-sourced technology, the HR16 1.6 liter engine mated to a 5-speed manual transmission or CVT gearbox. The redesign resulted in a body size increase of 5 mm (0.2 in) in length.

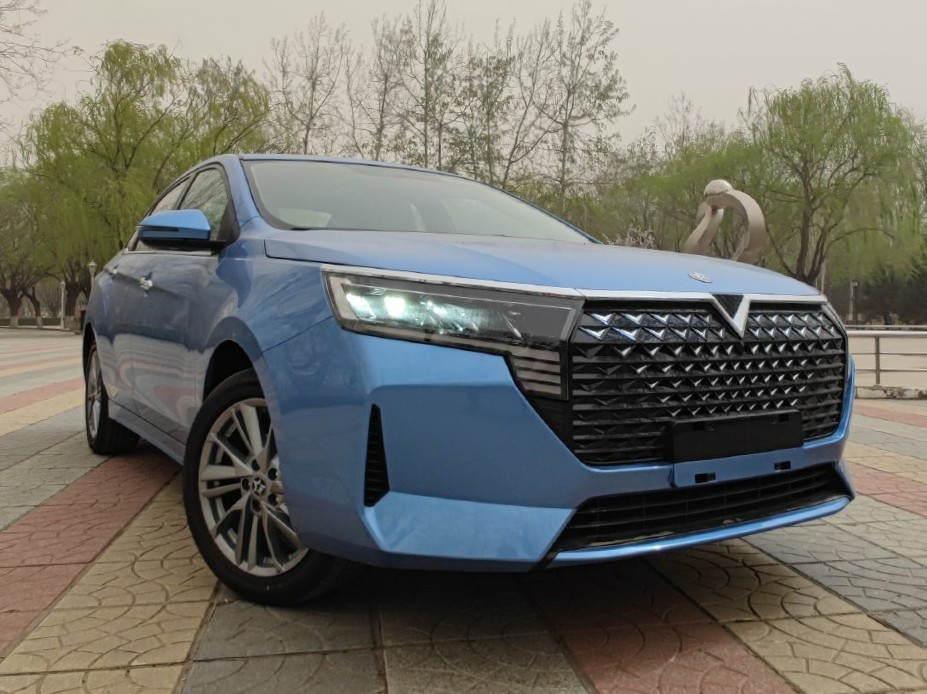
Venucia D60 Plus

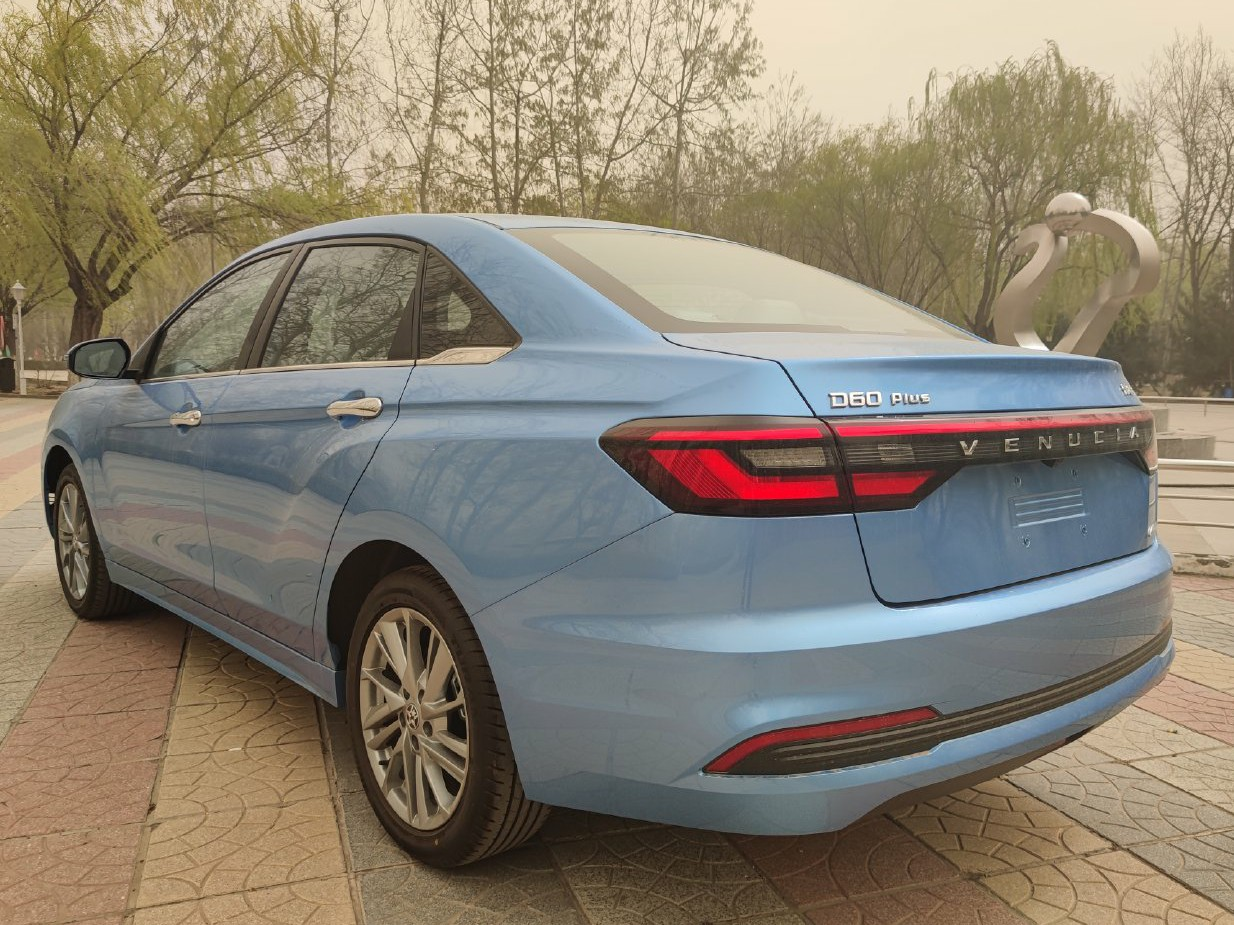
Venucia D60 Plus (rear)

== Venucia D60EV ==
The Venucia D60EV is the electric version of the Venucia D60 sedan. It was revealed during the 2019 Shanghai Auto Show alongside the T60EV electric crossover, and available to the market in September 2019. The D60EV is equipped with a ternary lithium battery pack with a capacity of 58kWh, and the cruising range is 481 kilometres (299 mi) under the NEDC standard.

Based on the D60, the D60EV been completely redesigned in the position of front grille, the lower bumper, fog lights, and rear bumper. The D60EV design previews the following D60 facelift. For the D60EV, the closed front grille design has become the standard for new energy vehicles, and the arrow-shaped fog light design is the most significant update of the entire fascia. The redesign resulted in a new length of 4,764 mm (187.6 in) and the electric drivetrain result in a new height of 1,494 mm (58.8 in). The D60EV is offered in three trim levels, with a price range of 137,800 to 153,800 yuan (~US$19,185 – US$21,412).

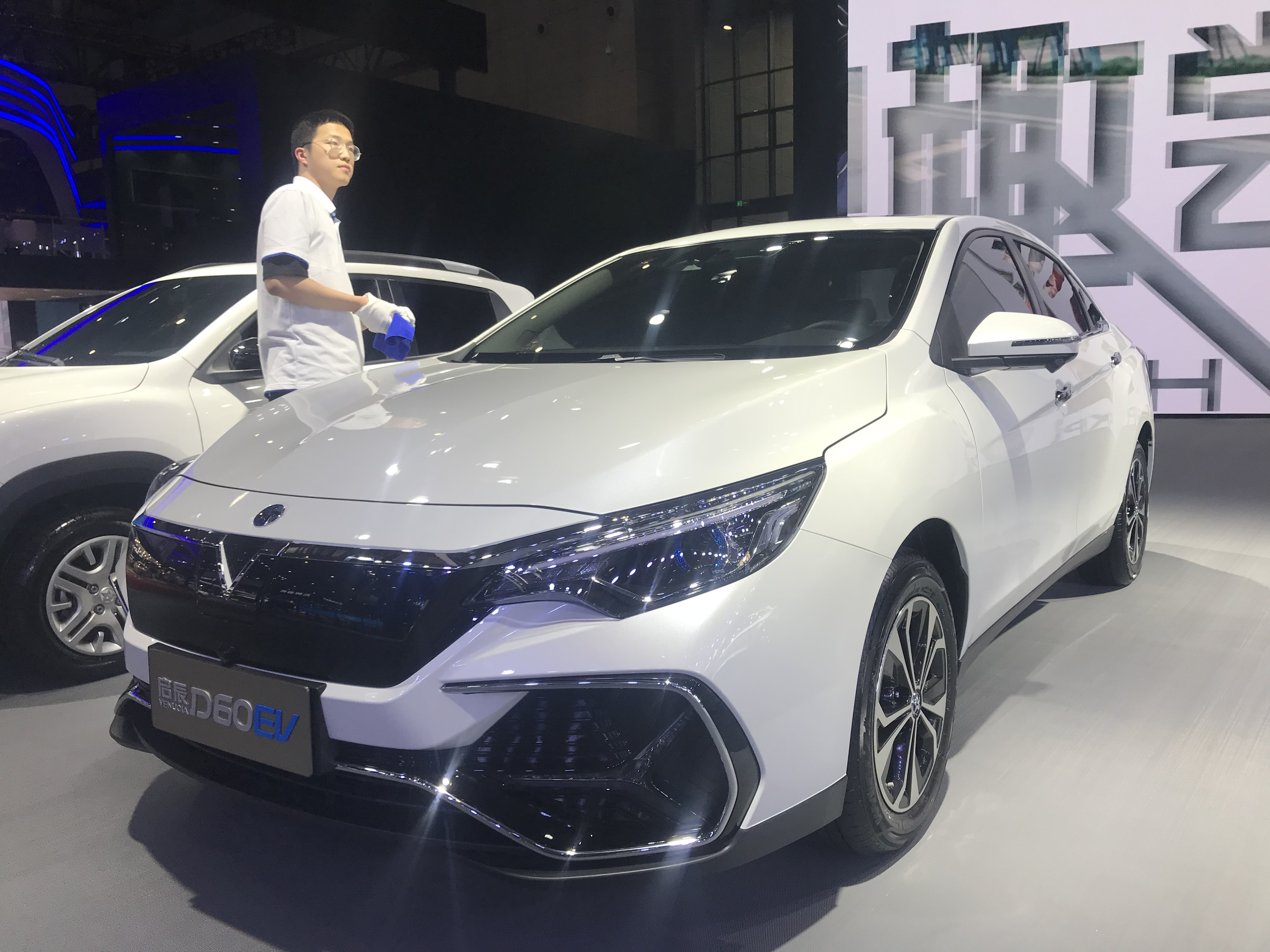
Venucia D60EV

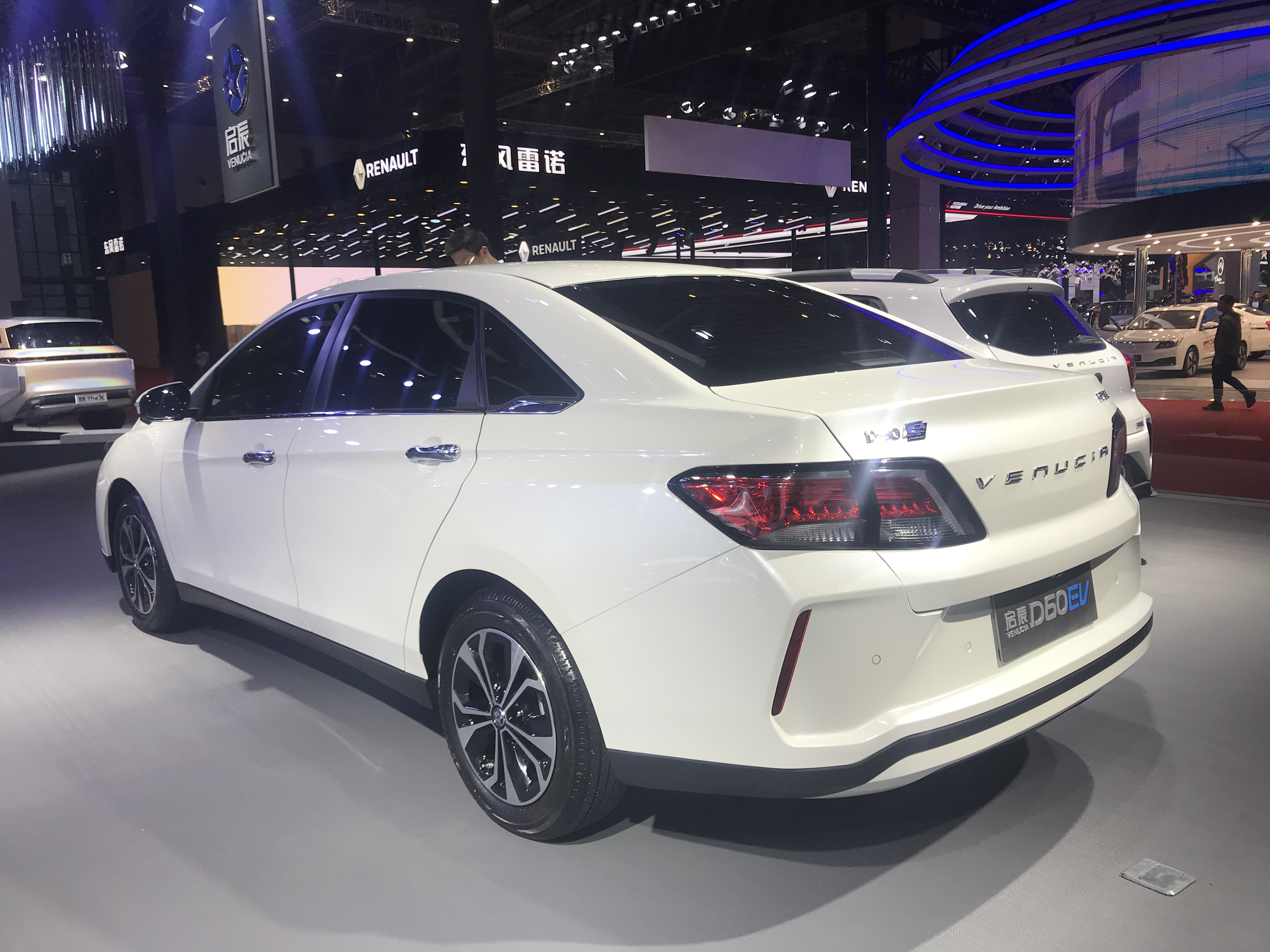
Venucia D60EV (rear)

The 2023 D60EV facelift features the rear end same redesign as the D60 Plus sedan while the front end design remains to be the same.

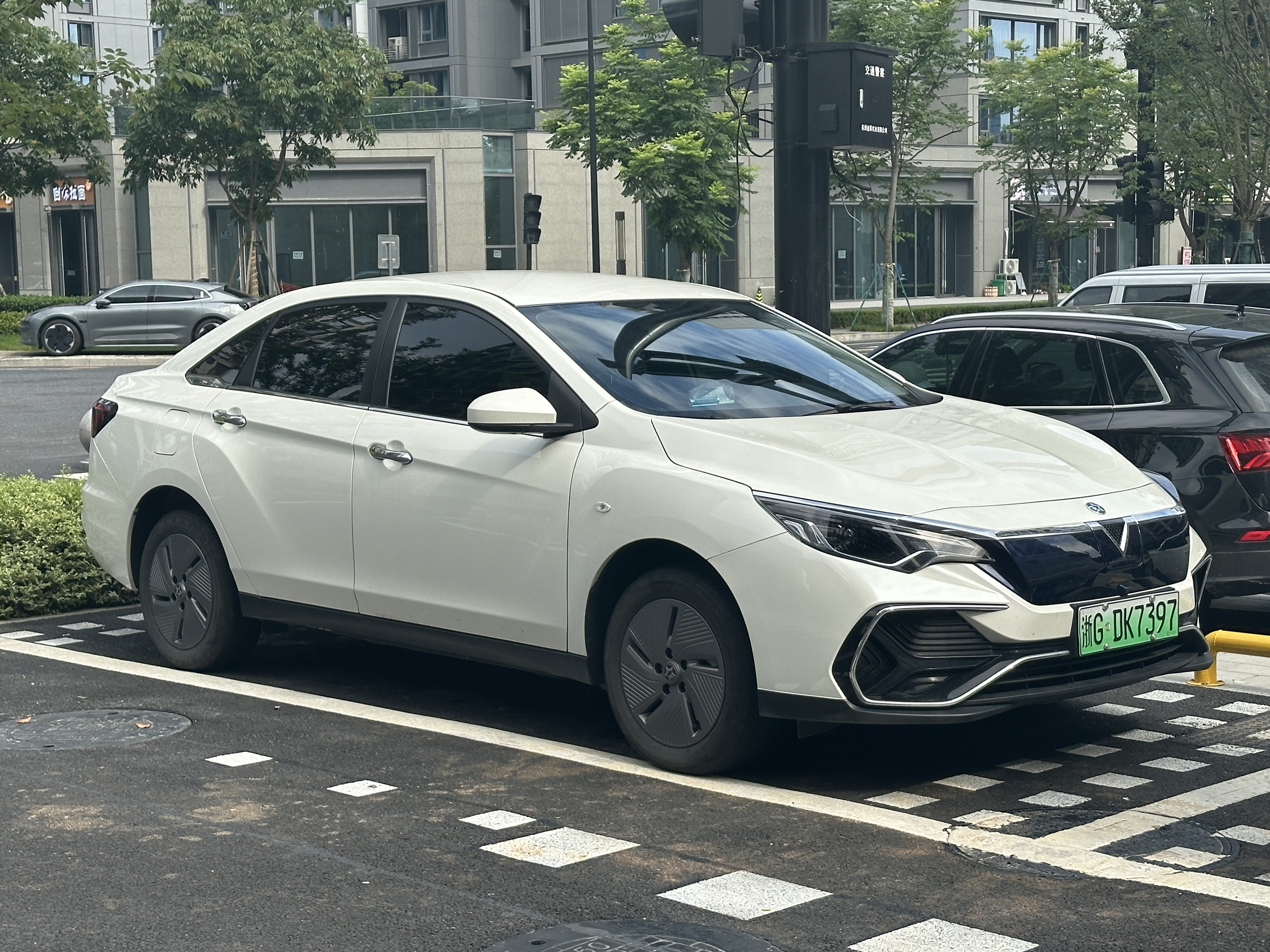
Venucia D60EV 2023 facelift

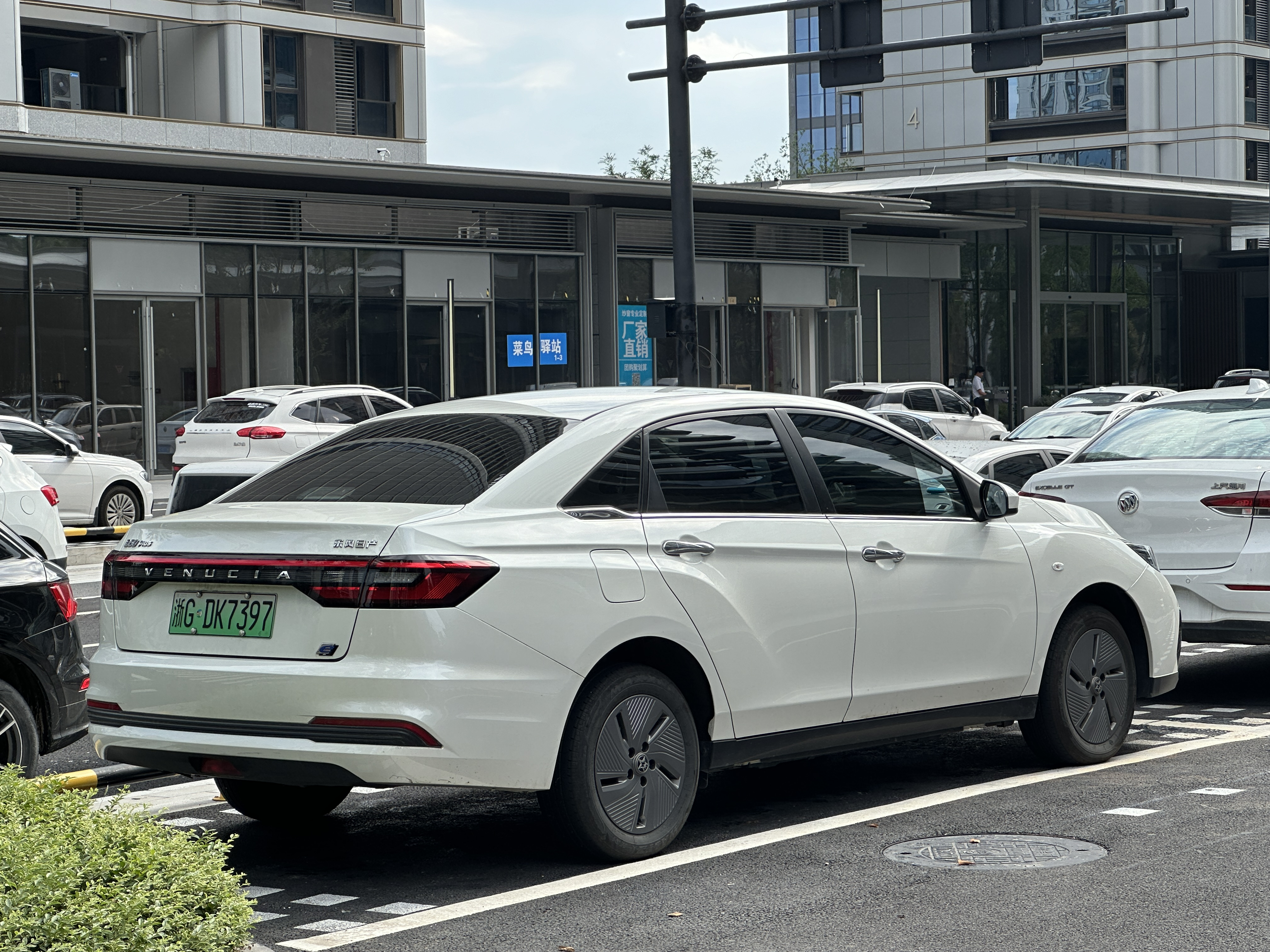
Venucia D60EV 2023 facelift (rear)

== Sales ==
| Year | China | | |
| Year | D60 | EV | Total |
|---|---|---|---|
| 2023 | 4,249 | 17,834 | 22,083 |
| 2024 | 11,572 | 9,752 | 21,324 |
| 2025 | 3,075 | 2,633 | 5,708 |
