= Venucia V-Online =

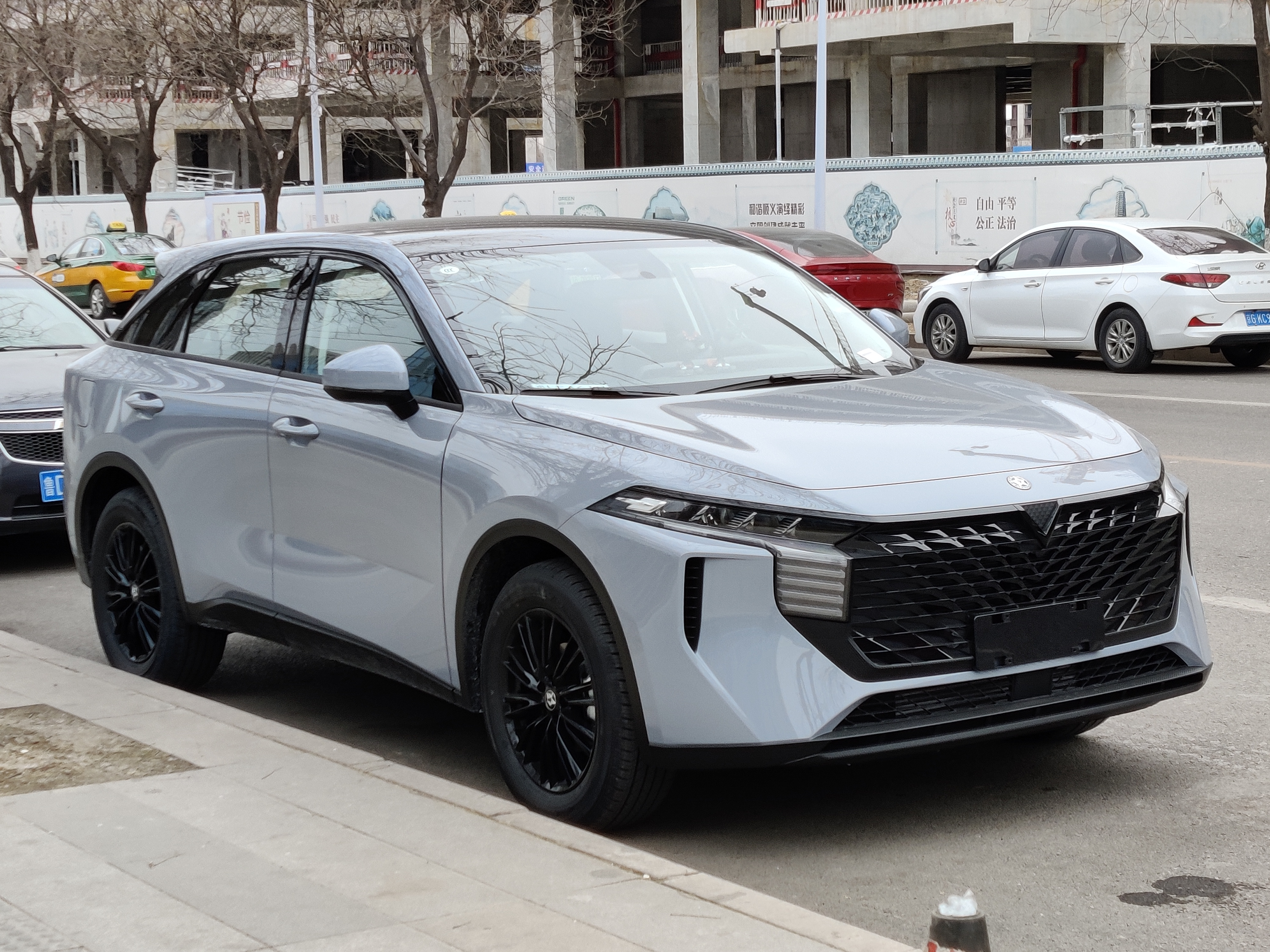

Overview
- Manufacturer: Venucia (Dongfeng Nissan)
- Also called: Venucia Da-V (大V); Venucia Big V Venucia Grand V
- Production: 2021–present
- Assembly: China: Zhengzhou (Dongfeng Nissan)

Body and chassis
- Class: Compact crossover SUV
- Body style: 4-door SUV
- Layout: Front-engine, front-wheel-drive
- Platform: Venucia Smart Arquitecture
- Related: Venucia Xing

Powertrain
- Engine: Petrol: 1.5 L A415TD I4 turbo
- Power output: 140 kW (187 hp; 190 PS)
- Transmission: 7-speed dual-clutch

Dimensions
- Wheelbase: 2,700 mm (106.3 in)
- Length: 4,562 mm (179.6 in)
- Width: 1,917 mm (75.5 in)
- Height: 1,617–1,625 mm (63.7–64.0 in)
- Curb weight: 1,457–1,491 kg (3,212.1–3,287.1 lb)

The Venucia V-Online is a fastback compact crossover SUV produced by Dongfeng Nissan under the Venucia brand. The Chinese name is Da-V (大V) and sometimes referred to as Big V or Grand V.

== History ==
The V-Online is positioned below the Venucia Xing and was presented on 20 August 2021. Shortly afterwards, it went on sale in mainland China.

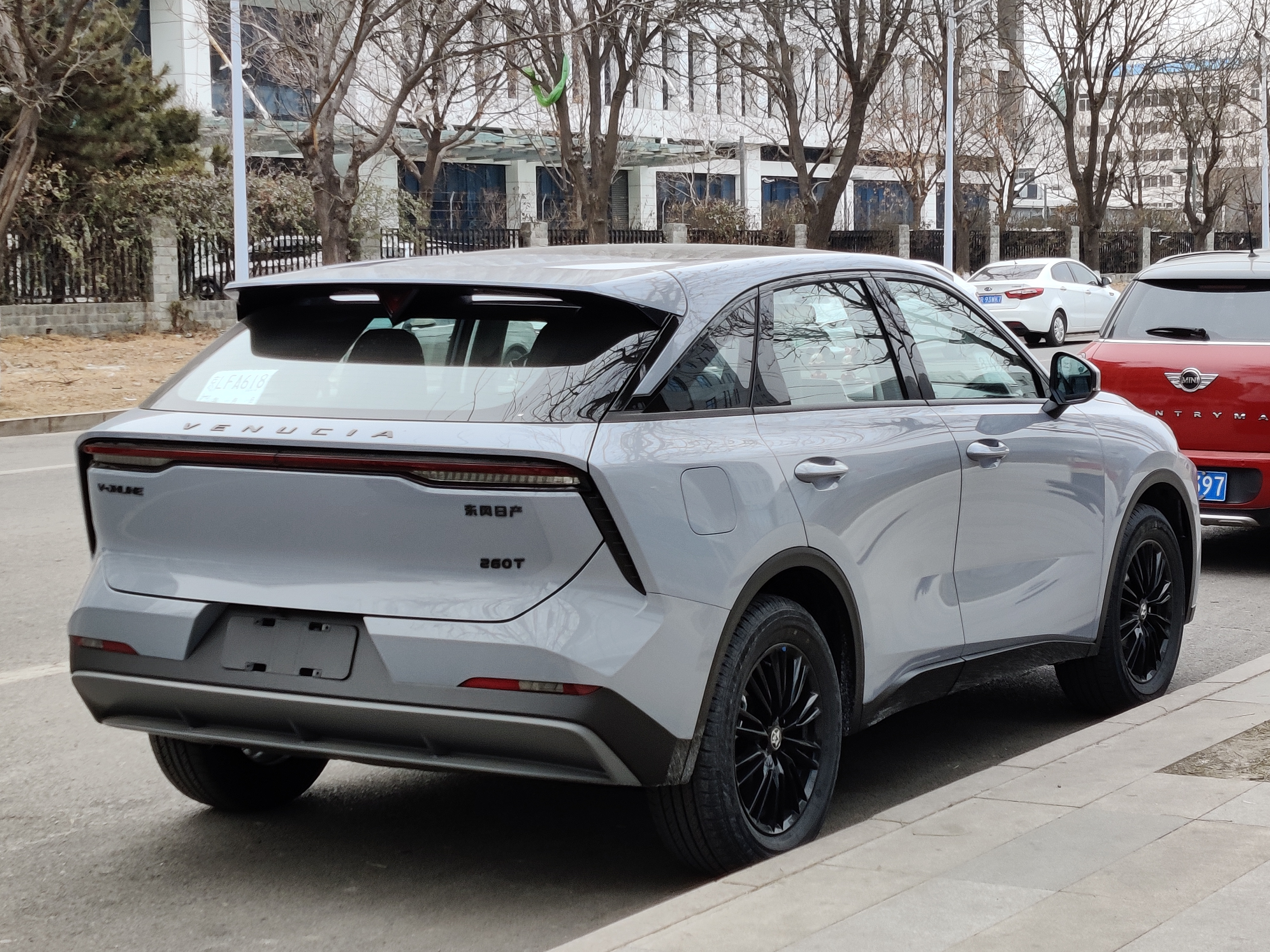
Venucia V-Online rear

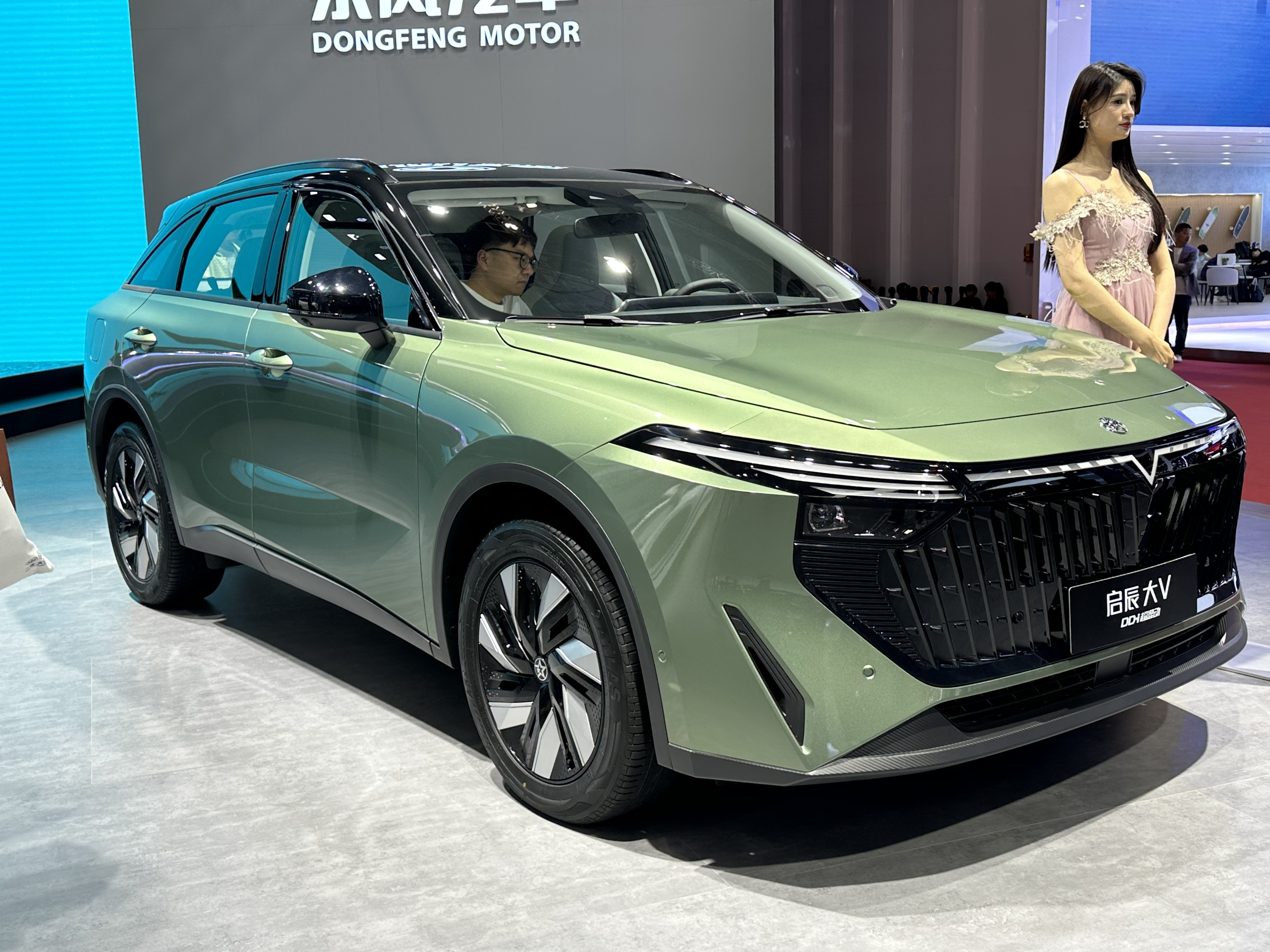
Venucia V-Online DD-i

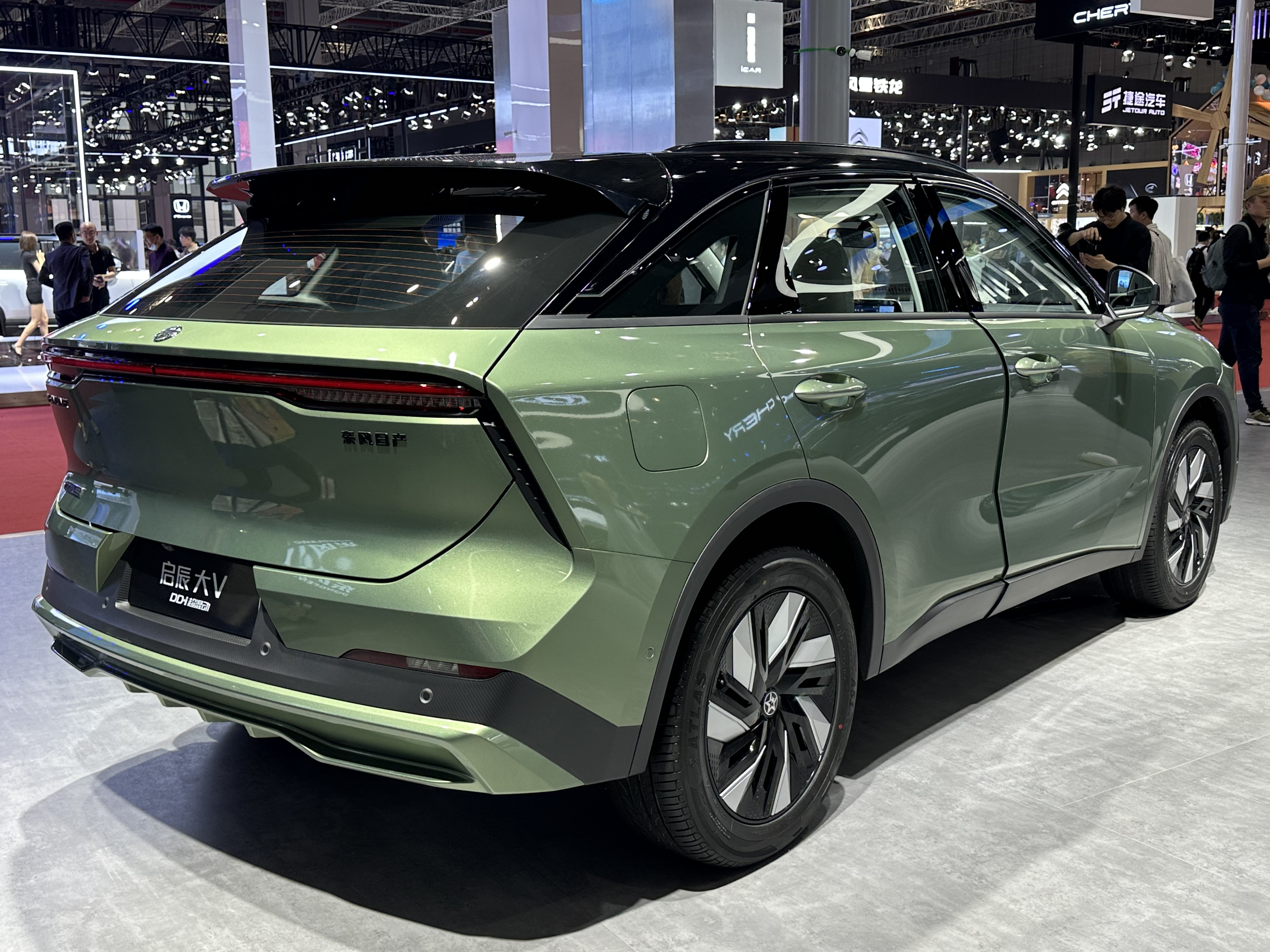
Venucia V-Online DD-i rear

== Technical specifications ==
The 4.56-meter-long V-Online is powered by a 1.5-liter petrol engine with 190 PS (187 hp; 140 kW). The vehicle is front-wheel drive and has a 7-speed dual clutch transmission. It accelerates to 100 km/h (62 mph) in 8.8 seconds.

== Sales ==
Year	China			
Year	V-Online	DD-i	Hydrogen	Total
2023	24,656	10,916	—	35,572
2024	7,268	11,899	12	19,179
2025	3,659	2,905	3	6,567
