= 60th Infantry Division (South Korea) =

Republic of Korea Army formation

- Active: 1 June 1990 - present
- Country: South Korea
- Branch: Republic of Korea Reserve Forces
- Type: Infantry
- Role: Reserve forces
- Size: Division
- Part of: Mobilization Force Command
- Garrison/HQ: Goyang, Gyeonggi
- Nickname(s): "Gwon Yul"

Commanders
- Current commander: Brig. Gen. Baek Ja-Seong

The 60th Reserve Infantry Division (Korean: 제60동원보병사단) is a military formation of the Republic of Korea Reserve Forces (ROKA). The division is subordinated to the Mobilization Force Command and is headquartered in Goyang City, Gyeonggi Province. Its responsibility is the defense of Seoul.

The division was created on 1 June 1990.

== Organization ==
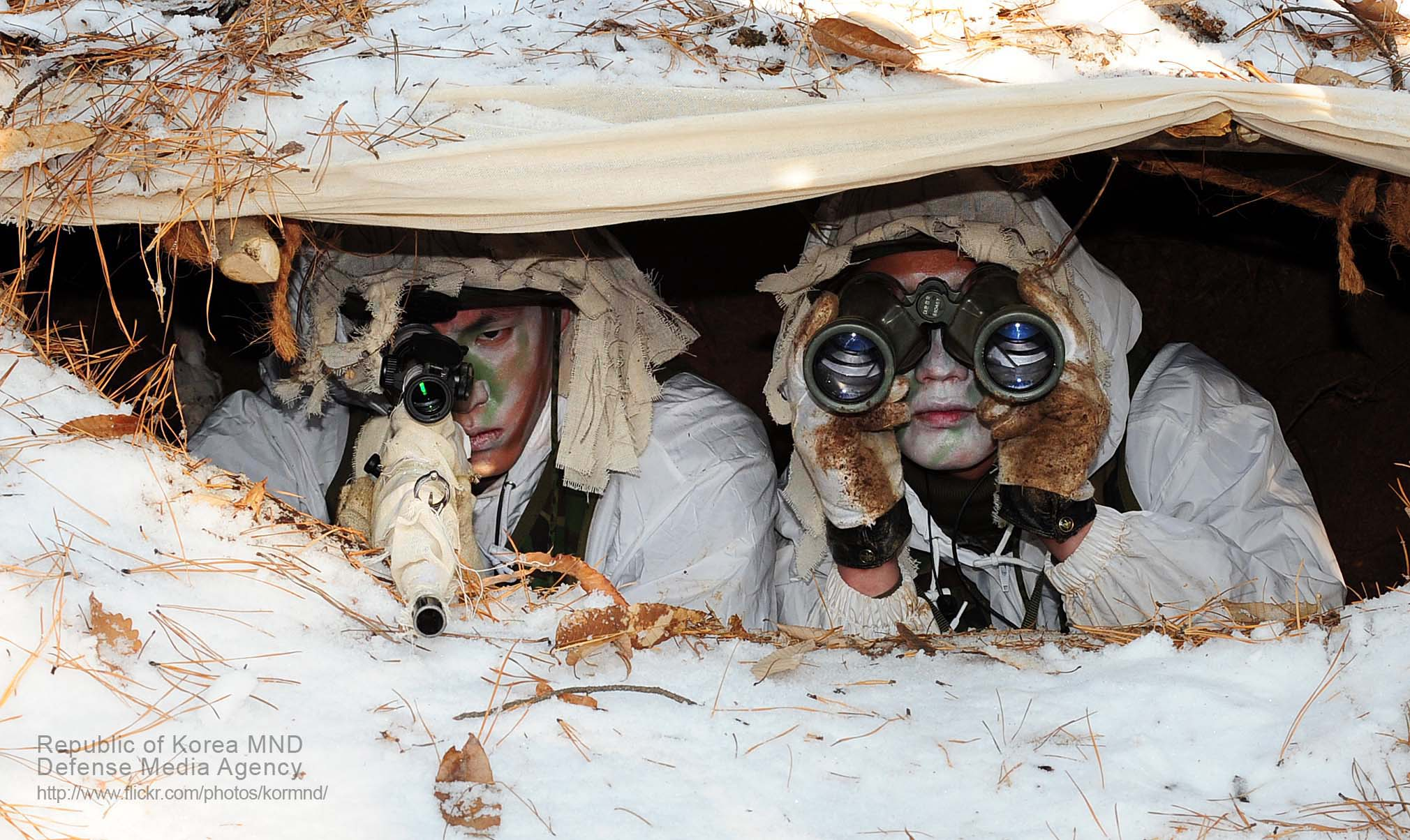
Two soldiers of the 60th Infantry Division are performing reconnaissance in the operation area in 2012

- Headquarters:
  - Headquarters Battalion
  - Reconnaissance Battalion
  - Engineer Battalion
  - Armor Battalion (M48A5K)
  - Chemical Company
  - Signal Battalion
  - Support Battalion
  - Medical Battalion
- 160th Infantry Brigade
- 161st Infantry Brigade
- 162nd Infantry Brigade
- Artillery Brigade
  - 3 Artillery Battalions (equipped with M101 howitzer)
  - Artillery Battalion (equipped with M114 howitzer)

== See also ==
- Korean Demilitarized Zone
