= 60th Brigade =

60th Brigade may refer to:

== China ==
- 60th Motorized Infantry Brigade (People's Republic of China)

== India ==
- 60th Indian Infantry Brigade of the British Indian Army in the First World War

== Russia ==
- 60th Motor Rifle Brigade

== Spain ==
- 60th Mixed Brigade of the Spanish Republican Army

== Ukraine ==
- 60th Artillery Brigade (Ukraine)
- 60th Mechanized Brigade

== United Kingdom ==
- 60th Brigade (United Kingdom)

=== Artillery units ===
- 60th Brigade, Royal Field Artillery, of the British Army in the First World War
- 60th (North Midland) Brigade, Royal Field Artillery, of the British Army after the First World War
- 60th (6th Cheshire and Shropshire) Medium Brigade, Royal Garrison Artillery

== See also ==
- 60th Division (disambiguation)
- 60th Regiment (disambiguation)
