= Title IX (disambiguation) =

Title IX of the Education Amendments of 1972 is a landmark Civil Rights law.

Title IX may also refer to:

- Title 9 of the United States Code
- Title 9 of the Code of Federal Regulations
- Title IX of the Patriot Act
- Title IX of the Civil Rights Act of 1964 - law making it easier to move civil rights cases from U.S. state courts to federal court
- Title Nine Sports - American sports apparel brand
