= Venucia Xing =

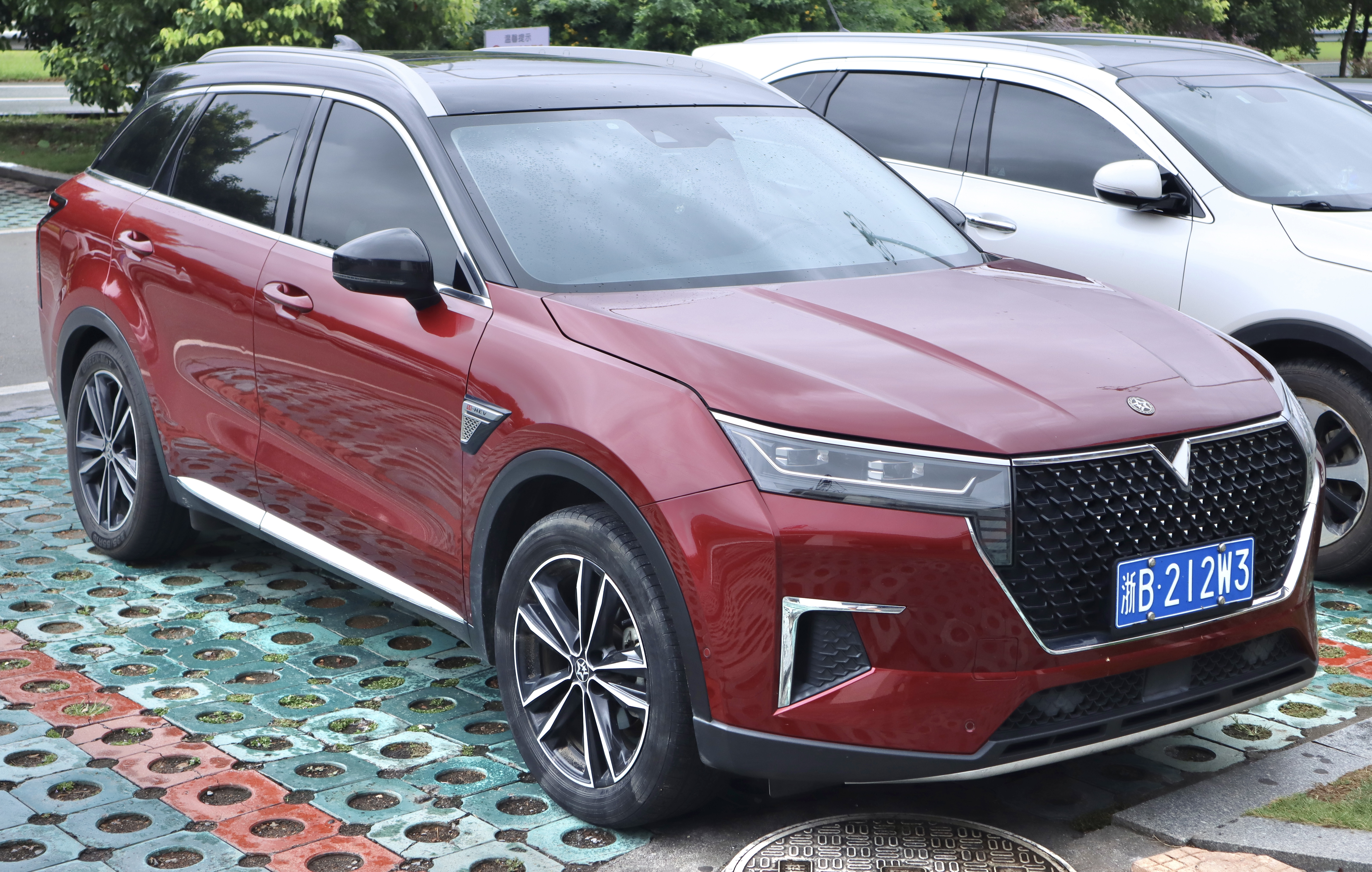

Overview
- Manufacturer: Venucia (Dongfeng Nissan)
- Also called: Venucia Star
- Production: 2020–present
- Assembly: China: Zhengzhou

Body and chassis
- Class: Compact crossover SUV
- Body style: 4-door SUV
- Layout: Front-engine, front-wheel-drive
- Platform: Venucia Smart Arquitecture
- Related: Venucia V-Online

Powertrain
- Engine: Petrol: 1.5 L I4 turbo
- Power output: 140 kW (187 hp; 190 PS)
- Transmission: 6-speed manual 7-speed dual-clutch

Dimensions
- Wheelbase: 2,756 mm (108.5 in)
- Length: 4,691 mm (184.7 in)
- Width: 1,905 mm (75.0 in)
- Height: 1,694–1,706 mm (66.7–67.2 in)
- Curb weight: 1,477–1,622 kg (3,256.2–3,575.9 lb)

The Venucia Xing or Venucia Star is a compact crossover SUV produced by Venucia, a subsidiary of the Dongfeng Nissan joint venture.

== History ==
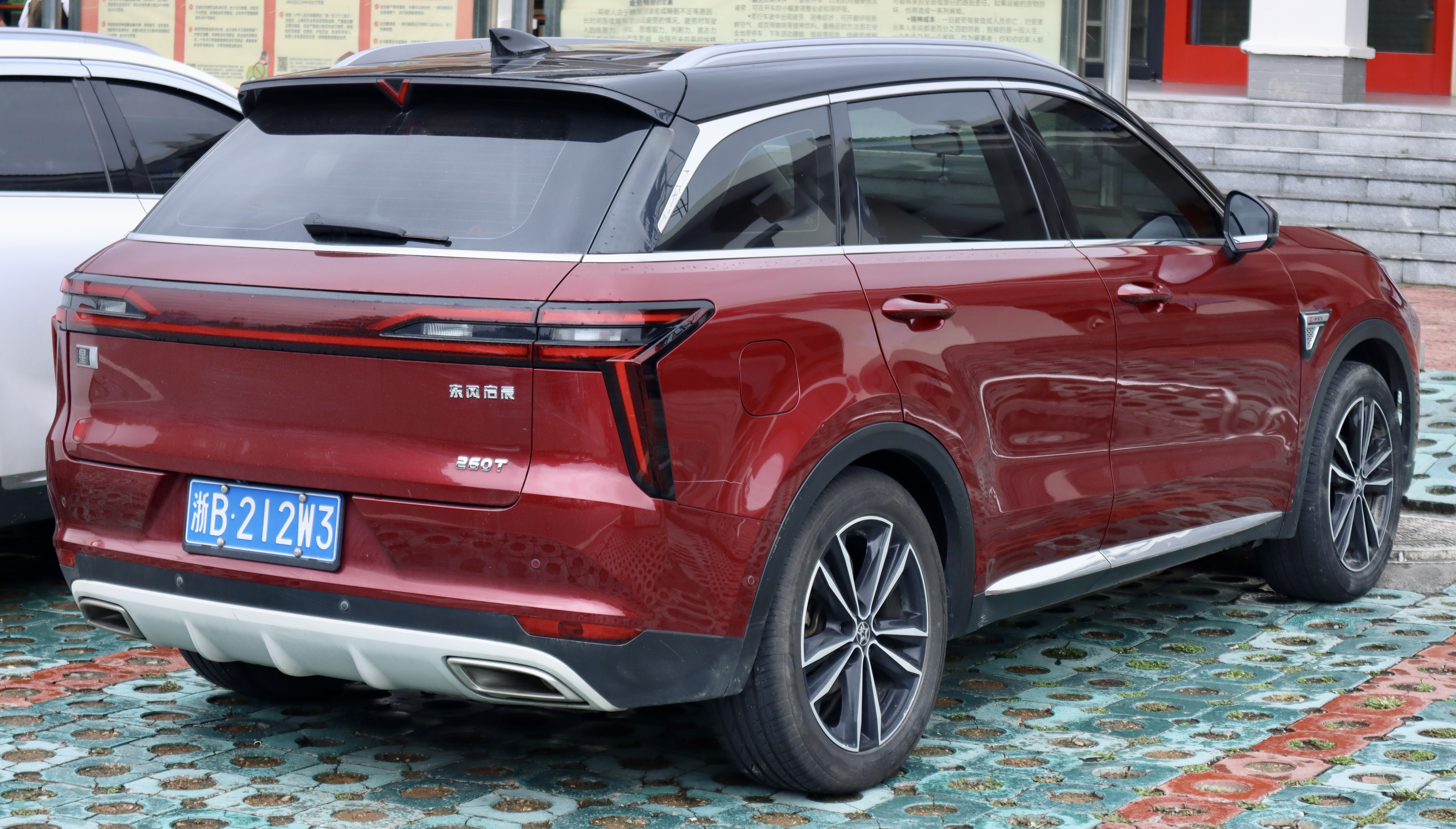
Rear view

The Xing was presented at the Auto Guangzhou in November 2019. It has been on sale in mainland China since April 2020.

== Technical specifications ==
The Xing is powered by a turbocharged 1.5-liter petrol engine with 190 PS (187 hp; 140 kW). It is also available with a 48-volt electrical system for an additional charge. The manufacturer specifies the maximum speed at 190 km/h (118 mph).

== Sales ==
Year	China
2023	3,050
2024	1,306
2025	409
