= 60th Regiment of Foot (disambiguation) =

Three regiments of the British Army have been numbered the 60th Regiment of Foot:

- 60th Regiment of Foot (1739–1748)
- 58th (Rutlandshire) Regiment of Foot, 60th Regiment of Foot, raised in 1755 and renumbered as the 58th in 1756
- 60th (Royal American) Regiment of Foot, later the King's Royal Rifle Corps, raised in 1755 as the 62nd and renumbered as the 60th in 1756
