= 60th Street =

60th Street may refer to:

- 59th/60th Street University of Chicago station, a Metra station in Chicago, Illinois
- 60th Street (Manhattan), an east–west street in Manhattan, New York City
- 60th Street station (SEPTA), an elevated stop on the Market-Frankford Line in Philadelphia, Pennsylvania
