= 60th Tennessee Infantry Regiment =

- Flag of Tennessee
- Active: 1862–1865
- Country: Confederate States of America
- Allegiance: Confederate States Army
- Branch: Army of Tennessee
- Type: Infantry
- Engagements: Battle of Chickasaw Bayou *Battle of Chickasaw Bluff *Battle of Vicksburg *Battle of Big Black River Bridge

Commanders
- Notable commanders: John Alex Crawford

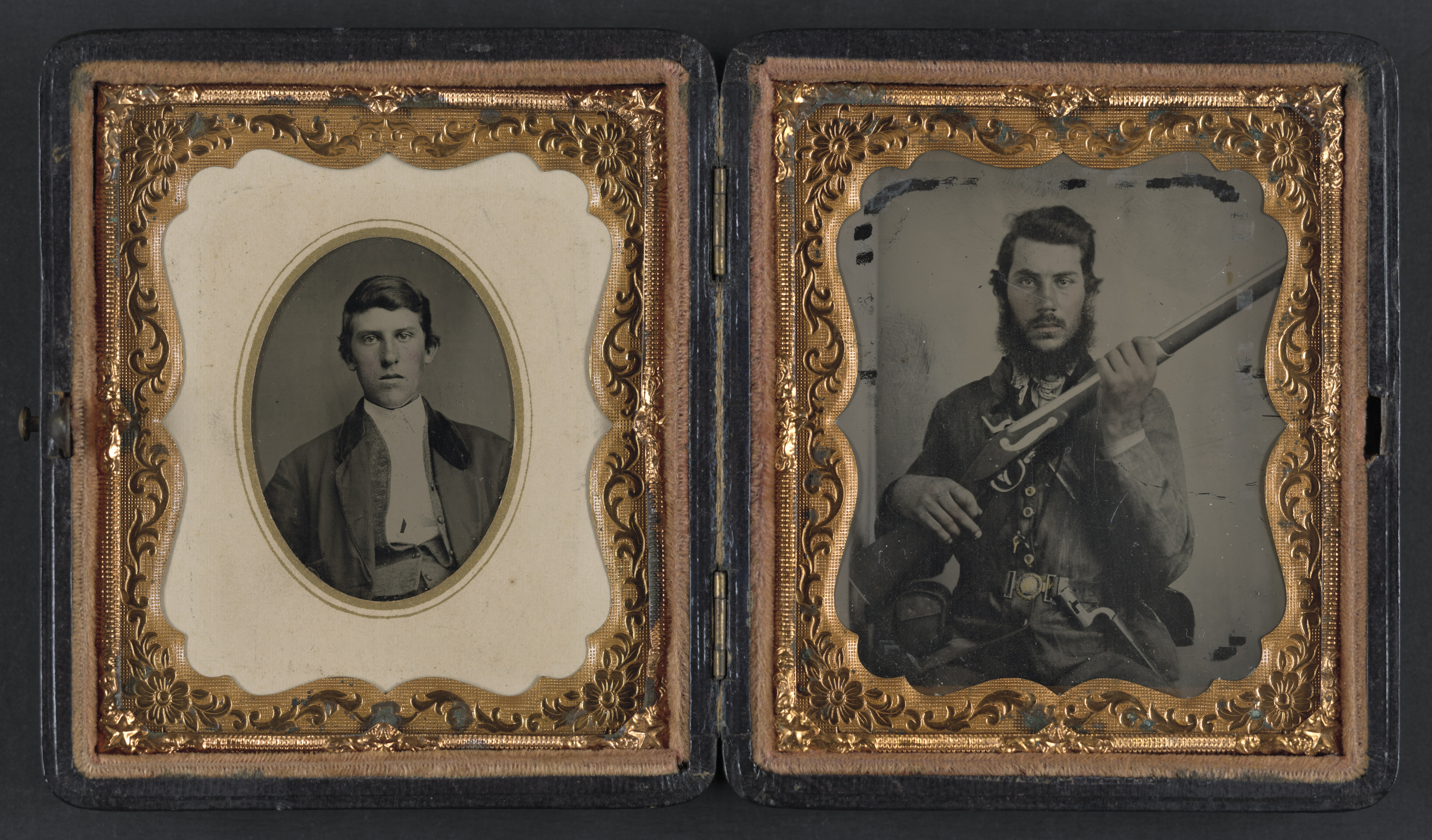
Sergeant James Bishop White of Company B, 60th Tennessee Infantry Regiment

The 60th Tennessee Infantry Regiment, or Sixtieth Tennessee Volunteer Infantry Regiment, was an infantry regiment in the Confederate States Army during the American Civil War. The 60th Tennessee was organized October 1, 1862; mustered into Confederate service November 7, 1862; captured at Vicksburg; served remainder of war in Vaughn's Brigade in East Tennessee and Western Virginia.

== Organization ==
This regiment was first known as the 79th Tennessee Infantry Regiment, but was officially designated the 60th Tennessee Infantry Regiment by the Adjutant and Inspector General's Office. It was organized into a regiment at Haynesville (present-day Johnson City, Tennessee), from 11 companies which had been enrolled in August, and September. When mustered into Confederate service, the mustering authorities would only accept 10 companies for the regiment, and Company "L" apparently disbanded, as no further record of it has been found.

Immediately after organization the regiment was assigned to the brigade of Brigadier General John C. Vaughn along with the 61st and 62nd Tennessee Regiments. These regiments remained together in Vaughn's Brigade throughout the war. The brigade was ordered to the Department of Mississippi and Eastern Louisiana and arrived at Jackson, Mississippi late in November, 1862. Lieutenant General John C. Pemberton reported: "On December 21, 1862, while at Grenada, Mississippi, information was received that a large fleet of gunboats and transports was moving down the Mississippi for the supposed purpose of attacking Vicksburg. Brigadier General J. C. Vaughn's Brigade of East Tennessee was at once ordered to that point."

== Vicksburg ==
The brigade arrived December 26, and there participated in the Battle of Chickasaw Bayou and Chickasaw Bluffs. General Stephen D. Lee's Brigade formed the right of the line of defense, General Seth M. Barton's the center, and General Vaughn's the left. General Vaughn reported that on the second day he sent the 62nd to re-enforce Lee; the 60th to re-enforce Barton on the 3rd day; leaving one regiment, the 61st to defend the abattis. Pemberton's report stated; "on the left, commanded by Brigadier General Vaughn, the heavy abattis prevented the approach of the enemy except with sharpshooters who advanced continuously, but were met firmly by his East Tennesseans."

An inspection report by Bob E. Houston, Captain and Assistant Inspector General, for January–February, 1863 on Company "G". stated: I take pleasure in stating that in discipline, efficiency and military appearance this company exceeds that of any I have ever seen in Volunteer service."

The brigade remained at Vicksburg until about the first of May, when General Pemberton decided to meet the enemy in the field. Toward the end of this campaign, on May 17, while guarding a bridge over the Big Black River, Vaughn's Brigade was overwhelmed by a Federal division at the Battle of Big Black River Bridge. The 60th regiment surrendered to Brigadier General Stephen G. Burbridge's 1st Brigade, 10th Division. A regimental report stated: "Lieutenant Colonel Gregg, one captain, three 1st lieutenants, seven 2nd lieutenants, six brevet 2nd lieutenants, captured at Big Black, Mississippi on May 17, 1863, and have not been exchanged. Enlisted men captured at Big Black: 239. They belonged to Companies "A", "B", "C", "D", "E" "F", "H" and "I". This report was dated October, 1864. The Federal reports of this action stated that the regiment, with 360 stand of arms, was captured without the loss of a man by the Federal troops. What was left of the regiment fell back into Vicksburg, and remained in the trenches until the surrender on July 4, 1863. The brigade was surrendered as part of Major General Morgan Lewis Smith's Division, and paroled a few days after the surrender.

On July 16, Vaughn's Brigade was reported at Brandon, Mississippi. On September 15, Inspector General Cooper stated "Vaughn's Brigade was ordered to reassemble in East Tennessee, at such place as General Simon Buckner might designate. But if the men have been seized by the enemy, and their paroles taken from them, it will prevent their reorganization."

== Parole ==
Colonel J. G. Rose, of the 61st Regiment, in his outline in Lindsley's Annals of his own regiment, stated the men from the 61st who were paroled at Vicksburg were not exchanged until June 27, 1864, and the men captured at Big Black remained in Northern prisons until the winter of 1864–5. He further stated that in the spring of 1864 many of these paroled prisoners were assembled in parole camps at Jonesborough, Tennessee, awaiting exchange. The 60th was not paroled until July 1, 1864, its members remaining at their homes during their paroles. After exchange, they became mounted infantry. A detachment from the 60th, 61st and 62nd regiments was reported near Jonesborough, September 13, 1864.

In the meantime, General Vaughn had been given command of Colonel A. W. Reynolds' Brigade, composed of the 3rd Confederate, 39th, 43rd and 59th Tennessee Infantry Regiments. These regiments were mounted about the last of 1863, and served as Mounted Infantry from then on. On December 31, 1863, a detachment from the 2nd Fast Tennessee Brigade, under Major James A. Rhea, of the 60th, was reported as a part of this brigade. On March 31, 1864, the detachment was listed as from the 60th, 61st and 62nd Regiments, and was commanded by Lieutenant Colonel William Parker of the 62nd. An inspection report dated May 6, 1864, showed this detachment consisted of only 48 men present. On April 20, 1864, a detachment from the 16th Georgia Battalion, 3rd, 39th, 43rd, 60th, 61st and 62nd Tennessee Regiments, under Captain Nathan Dodd of the 61st was reported in General Bushrod Johnson's Brigade, General Simon Buckner's Division, at Zollicoffer (now Bluff City), Tennessee.

== Vaughn's Brigade ==
It was not until November 10, 1864, that the 60th, 61st and 62nd Regiments were reported as regiments in Vaughn's Brigade. At that time the 60th was commanded by Lieutenant Colonel Gregg, and the brigade was made up of the 16th Georgia Cavalry Battalion, 1st (Carter's), 3rd, 39th, 43rd, 59th, 60th, 61st and 62nd Tennessee Mounted Regiments, 12th (Day's) and 16th (Neal's) Cavalry Battalions. The brigade reported 993 effectives, 1358 present, 796 prisoners of war. It was in the Department of Western Virginia and East Tennessee, commanded by Major General John C. Breckinridge. The 60th was reported stationed near Davenault's Ford.

This was the last regimental or company report found on the 60th. On February 28, 1865, the order of battle for Brigadier General John Echols' Command showed the 60th, now commanded by Colonel Gregg, still in Vaughn's Brigade, with Abbott's Scouts having been added to the brigade, and the 13th Georgia Infantry Regiment reported instead of the 16th Georgia Battalion. General Echols was still in command of the department when news of General Lee's surrender was received, and he dissolved his command in Western Virginia. Some of General Vaughn's Brigade crossed into North Carolina and served as part of President Jefferson Davis' escort from Charlotte, North Carolina to Washington, Georgia, but it is not known whether or not any of the 60th were in this force.

=== Officers ===
- Colonels- John Alex Crawford, Nathan Gregg.
- Lieutenant Colonels- Nathan Gregg, James Alex Rhea.
- Major- James Alex Rhea.
- Captains

Co. "A" — Francis S. Blair
Co. "B" — Samuel Rhea Gammon
Co. "C" — John H. Crouch
Co. "D" — Mark M. Pritchett, Joseph L. Hale
Co. "E" — William R. Howard
Co. "F" — Mark Bacon
Co. "G" — James A. Rhea (promoted to major), J. W. Bachman, Joseph R. Crawford
Co. "H" — James C. Hodges
Co. "I" — William A. Wash
Co. "K" — John M. Morrow
Co. "L" — Harvey Hamilton

== See also ==
- List of Tennessee Civil War Confederate units
- Tennessee in the American Civil War
