= L10 =

L10 or L-10 may be:

== Military ==
- Landsverk L-10, a Swedish tank
- HMS L10, a 1918 British L class submarine
- L10 Ranger Anti-Personnel mine, a British blast mine
- L 10, ASJA and Saab's internal designation for the Saab 17 1940s military aircraft
- L 10 Friedensengel, a variant of the World War II Blohm & Voss BV 950 torpedo
- USS L-10 (SS-50), an L-class submarine of the United States Navy

== Transportation ==
- Cummins L10, a Cummins L Series diesel engine marketed from 1983 to 1997
- L.10 Electra, 1930s Lockheed airliner
- L10, development name for the 1930s Junkers Jumo 210 aircraft engine
- Scania-Vabis L10 (1944–1959), a series of trucks produced by Swedish automaker Scania-Vabis

== Other uses ==
- Al Fajer L-10, a drone built by Start Aviation
- ISO/IEC 8859-16 (Latin-10), an 8-bit character encoding
- L10 life, the rate at which 10% of bearings are expected to fail
- Panasonic Lumix DMC-L10, a 2007 digital single-lens reflex camera

== See also ==
- L10n
- Magdeburger Startgerät, a missile, also known as the 10-L
