= 60th Regiment =

60th Regiment or 60th Infantry Regiment may refer to:

- 60th Regiment of Foot (disambiguation), three British Army units carried this name
- 60th Infantry Regiment (United States), a unit of the United States Army
- 60th Air Defense Artillery Regiment, a unit of the United States Army
- 60th Infantry Regiment "Calabria"

American Civil War

Union (Northern) Army

- 60th Illinois Volunteer Infantry Regiment
- 60th Indiana Infantry Regiment
- 60th Ohio Infantry
- 60th United States Colored Infantry Regiment
- 60th New York Volunteer Infantry
- 60th Regiment Massachusetts Volunteer Infantry

Confederate (Southern) Army

- 60th Virginia Infantry
- 60th Tennessee Infantry Regiment
