= 60th Mountain Rifle Division =

- Active: 24 Apr - 19 Sep 1941
- Country: Soviet Union
- Branch: Red Army
- Type: Division
- Role: Mountain Infantry
- Engagements: Operation Barbarossa; Battle of Uman

Commanders
- Notable commanders: Maj. Gen. Markis Bikmulovich Salikhov

The 60th Mountain Rifle Division was formed as a specialized infantry division of the Red Army in the spring of 1941, based on the 60th "Caucasian" Rifle Division which traced its origins back to just after the Russian Civil War. At the time of the German invasion on June 22, 1941, it was located in the foothills of the Carpathian Mountains near the border with Hungary as part of the 17th Rifle Corps of 12th Army in the Kiev Special Military District. While the division was not attacked by the main German forces in the first days, its almost total lack of trucks and shortage of horses made it difficult to retreat to the east. It was soon transferred with 17th Corps to the new 18th Army in Southern Front, but returned to 12th Army in mid-July. It fell back through western Ukraine under that headquarters into August when it found itself encircled in the Uman pocket where all but remnants of the division were destroyed. The 60th Mountain was finally officially disbanded on 19 September 1941.

== Formation ==
The division was officially converted from the 60th Rifle Division on April 24, 1941, based on the prewar shtat (table of organization and equipment) for mountain rifle divisions, which among other things required the formation of a fourth rifle regiment:

- 196th Mountain Rifle Regiment
- 224th Mountain Rifle Regiment
- 350th Mountain Rifle Regiment
- 358th Mountain Rifle Regiment
- 54th Artillery Regiment
- 83rd Howitzer Artillery Regiment
- 275th Antitank Battalion
- 84th Antiaircraft Battalion
- 52nd Cavalry Squadron
- 76th Sapper Battalion
- 85th Signal Battalion
- 39th Artillery Park Battalion
- 46th Medical/Sanitation Battalion
- 90th Chemical Protection (Anti-gas) Company
- 51st Motor Transport Battalion
- 406th Motor Transport Company
- 75th Field Bakery (motorized)
- 167th Field Postal Station
- 401st Field Office of the State Bank

The division was commanded by Maj. Gen. Markis Bikmulovich Salikhov, who had been the 60th Rifle's deputy commander until April 24, 1940, and had been promoted to general's rank on June 4 of that year. It was one of six rifle divisions converted to mountain divisions in Ukraine in late 1940/early 1941; like the rest it received little or no specialized training or equipment before the invasion began. At that time it had on hand 8,313 officers and men with 7,742 bolt-action rifles and carbines, 349 semiautomatic rifles, 939 sub-machine guns, 357 light machine guns, 209 heavy machine guns, 8 45mm antitank guns, 32 76mm cannon and howitzers, 24 122mm howitzers and 120 mortars. Despite having, on paper, both a battalion and a company of trucks it actually had just 10 trucks and 1 tractor plus 2,280 horses for its transport; it was intended to mobilize the remainder from the civilian economy.

== Combat service ==
On June 25 the division was transferred with 17th Rifle Corps (60th and 96th Mountain, 164th Rifle Divisions) to the 18th Army which was being formed in Southern Front (former Odessa Military District). During early July the 17th Corps was mostly facing the Hungarian 8th Army Corps and by July 11 it had been forced back east of Kamianets-Podilskyi. Later that month the 60th was detached from the Corps and returned to 12th Army where it came under the command of 13th Rifle Corps before August 1. By July 23 it was fighting south of Lypovets, now against the German 97th Light Infantry Division, before falling back to just south of Uman at the end of the month.

By now both the 12th and 6th Armies were encircled in the Uman pocket. Breakout attempts, particularly on August 6 and 7, allowed individuals and small groups to escape the cauldron but apart from these remnants the 60th Mountain was smashed and was no longer carried on the Soviet order of battle by the end of the month, although it was not officially disbanded until September 19. Meanwhile, on July 29 General Salikhov had been relieved of command, court-martialed and condemned to 10 years imprisonment, although this was later commuted to demotion to the rank of colonel. He was replaced in command by Col. Boris Alekseevich Sorokin. Salikhov was soon given command of the 980th Rifle Regiment of the newly forming 275th Rifle Division near Novorossiysk which was shipped to the Odessa District in late August to join the reforming 6th Army. Within days of this move Salikhov was taken prisoner; he collaborated with the Germans at least until 1943 and on June 21 of that year was tried in absentia and condemned to death. He died on 1 August 1946.
