= 60th Infantry Division (Russian Empire) =

- 60-я пехотная дивизия
- Active: 1914–1918
- Country: Russian Empire
- Branch: Russian Imperial Army
- Role: Infantry

The 60th Infantry Division (Russian: 60-я пехотная дивизия, 60-ya Pekhotnaya Diviziya) was an infantry formation of the Russian Imperial Army.

== Organization ==
- 1st Brigade
  - 237th Infantry Regiment
  - 238th Infantry Regiment
- 2nd Brigade
  - 239th Infantry Regiment
  - 240th Infantry Regiment
