= 60 =

60 may refer to:

- 60 (number), the natural number following 59 and preceding 61
- one of the years 60 BC, AD 60, 1960, 2060
- Neodymium, the 60th element
- The international calling code for Malaysia
- <, the ASCII character with code 60
- Base 60 (sexagesimal, sexagenary)
- "Sixty", a song by Karma to Burn from the album Mountain Czar, 2016
- 60 Echo, a main-belt asteroid
- Audi 60, a compact executive car
- Various Rover models:
  - Rover 60, an executive car
  - Rover 60, a saloon

== See also ==
- 60th (disambiguation)
